= Fire services in Northumberland County =

Fire services in Northumberland County, Ontario, Canada, are provided by each municipality.

== Operations ==
=== Cobourg ===
Cobourg Fire Hall consists of one fire hall operated by 16 full-time workers, 16 part-time firefighters and an administrative assistant. The fire hall features two pumpers, one mini-pumper, one aerial, two service vehicles, a 32' safety house and a historic fire vehicle. The station is located at 111 Elgin Street East and was completed in 1975. The old station on Second Street is now occupied by Firehall Theatre -- an acting group.

=== Brighton ===
Brighton Fire Hall consists of two fire halls operated by a Fire Chief, Deputy Chief, and 34 volunteers. The stations are located at 20 Elizabeth Street in Brighton and County Road 27 in Codrington. North hall is home to 1 pumper, one tanker, and one heavy rescue. South Hall houses one pumper/tanker, one pumper, one QRV, one heavy rescue, and Chief's vehicle.

=== Port Hope ===
Port Hope Fire & Emergency Services consists of three Fire Stations operated by a Fire Chief, Deputy Fire Chief, three District Fire Chiefs, a Training Officer, a Fire Prevention Inspector, an Administrative Assistant, a Customer Service Assistant, 11 Officers, and a complement of 70 Firefighters. Station 1 in Port Hope consists of the one pumper/rescue, one aerial, one snuffer, and one rescue/command vehicle. Station 2 in Welcome consists of one pumper/rescue, one tanker/pumper, one tanker, and one rescue vehicle. Station 3 in Garden Hill consists of one rescue/pumper, one tanker/pumper, one snuffer, and one 4x4 pickup truck and trailer which hauls the department's RTV. The stations are located as follows:

- Fire Administration Office/Station 1 - 245 Ontario Street
- Station 2 - 4366 County Road 2
- Station 3 - 3585 Ganaraska Road

=== Trent Hills ===
Trent Hills Fire Hall consists of three fire halls operated by 57 volunteer firefighters. Station 1 is located in Campbellford/Seymour. Station 2 is located in Hastings. Station 3 is located in Warkworth.

=== Alnwick/Haldimand ===
Alnwick/Haldimand Fire Hall consists of three fire halls operated by three Chiefs and 47 volunteer firefighters. Station 1 is located in Grafton. Station 2 is located in Centreton. Station 3 is located in Roseneath. Under an agreement, services in Alnwick/Haldimand provide fire protection to members of the Alderville First Nation. The stations are located as follows:

- Station 1 - 434 Edwardson Road
- Station 2 - 2267 County Road #23
- Station 3 - 9059 County Road #45

=== Cramahe ===
Cramahe Fire Hall consists of two fire halls operated by five Captains and 23 volunteer firefighters. Station 1 (south hall) is located in Colborne. Station 2 (north hall) is located in Castleton. Between the two halls, there are two tankers, two pumpers, two rescue vehicles, and a truck for use by the Fire Chief. The stations are located as follows:

- North hall - 2221 Spring Street
- South hall - 232 Purdy Road

=== Hamilton ===
Hamilton Fire Hall consists of three fire halls operated by 60 volunteer firefighters. Station 1 is located in Baltimore. Station 2 is located in Bewdley. Station 3 is located in Harwood The stations are located as follows:

- Station 1 - 2598 Van Luven Road
- Station 2 - 5125 Main Street
- Station 3 - 5424 Front Street
