= Ontario Highway 45 =

Former Ontario provincial highway

King's Highway 45
- Northumberland County Road 45; Peterborough County Road 45
- Highway 45 highlighted in red

Route information
- Maintained by Ministry of Transportation of Ontario
- Length: 54.1 km (33.6 mi)
- Existed: September 1, 1937–January 1, 1998

Major junctions
- South end: Highway 2 (King Street) in Cobourg
- Highway 401 (Exit 474) – Toronto, Kingston
- North end: Highway 7 in Norwood

Location
- Country: Canada
- Province: Ontario
- Counties: Northumberland County, Peterborough County
- Towns: Cobourg, Baltimore, Hastings, Norwood
- Villages: Fenella, Alderville, Roseneath

Highway system
- Ontario provincial highways; Current; Former; 400-series
← Highway 44	→ Highway 46

King's Highway 45, commonly referred to as Highway 45, was a provincially maintained highway in the Canadian province of Ontario. The 54.1-kilometre-long (33.6 mi) route connected Highway 2 in downtown Cobourg with Highway 7 in Norwood. In addition to the towns at either end, it bisected the communities of Baltimore, Fenella, Alderville, Roseneath and Hastings.

Established in 1937 along existing county roads, the highway generally maintained the same route throughout its existence, aside from minor realignments. In 1997, it was downloaded and transferred to the counties of Northumberland and Peterborough, both of which designated it as County Road 45.

== Route description ==
Highway 45 was a 54.1 km (33.6 mi) route that connected Highway 2 in Cobourg with Highway 7 in Norwood. In addition to several towns along the route, it provided access to the southeast side of Rice Lake. While the majority was within Northumberland County, the portion north of Hastings to Norwood was in Peterborough County.

Highway 45 began in downtown Cobourg at former Highway 2 (King Street) and proceeded north along Division Street. Division Street serves as the meridian for Cobourg and, as its name implies, divides perpendicular crossroads into eastern and western halves. In addition to Cobourg VIA, the Northam Industrial Park and retailers line the former highway. South of an interchange with Highway 401 (Exit 474), the former highway curves northeast and becomes Baltimore Road.

After crossing Highway 401, the route becomes a two-lane rural road. It is surrounded by consistent residential properties between Cobourg and Baltimore, after which it becomes immersed in forests. Meandering north-northeast, the former highway intersects Northumberland County Road 29 and becomes surrounded by farmland as it approaches the village of Fenella. There it resumes a north-easterly course towards Roseneath, passing through the Alderville First Nation along the way. Between Roseneath and Hastings, the route travels several kilometres inland from the southern shore of Rice Lake.

South of Hastings, former Highway 45 encounters Northumberland County Road 25 (Langford Drive) and turns north. Within the town of Hastings it crosses the Trent River, through which the Trent–Severn Waterway travels between Lake Ontario and Lake Huron via Lake Simcoe and Georgian Bay. North of Hastings, the former highway generally travels north in a straight line through farmland until entering the town of Norwood, where it crosses the Ouse River before ending at Highway 7 25 km (16 mi) east of Peterborough.

North of Cobourg, the portion of former Highway 45 between Highway 401 and north of Baltimore is within Hamilton Township. It then passes through the municipality of Alnwick/Haldimand until midway between Roseneath and Hastings, with the exception of the Alderville First Nation. From there to the northern limits of Hastings it lies within the municipality of Trent Hills. All of these are within Northumberland County. The remainder of the former route north of Hastings is within the municipality of Asphodel–Norwood within Peterborough County.

== History ==
Construction south of Fenella on June 13, 1950

Highway 45 was assumed by the Department of Highways (DHO), predecessor to the modern Ministry of Transportation (MTO), on September 1, 1937, following the gravel-surfaced Cobourg–Norwood Road. The DHO immediately began work to improve the route by straightening and paving portions as well as bypassing steep hills; the highway was paved in 1938 through Roseneath and between Cobourg and Baltimore. Work began in 1947 to improve the route between Baltimore and Fenella, and was completed in 1951. Paving was completed on the highway between Fenella and Roseneath in 1954, and between Roseneath and south of Hastings in 1958. The remainder of the gravel portion of the highway from south of Hastings to Norwood was paved in 1962.

Highway 45 remained more or less unchanged between 1963 and 1998. As part of a series of budget cuts initiated by premier Mike Harris under his Common Sense Revolution platform in 1995, numerous highways deemed to no longer be of significance to the provincial network were decommissioned and responsibility for the routes transferred to a lower level of government, a process referred to as downloading. On January 1, 1998, the entire route of Highway 45 was downloaded and transferred to Northumberland County and Peterborough County. It has since been redesignated as County Road 45 by both.

== Major intersections ==
The following table lists the major junctions along Highway 45, as noted by the Ministry of Transportation of Ontario. Distances are listed according to the 1989 MTO Provincial Highway Distance Tables, while junctions are listed according to their current designation.

Division	Location	km	mi	Destinations	Notes
Northumberland	Cobourg	0.0	0.0	County Road 2 (King Street)	Formerly Highway 2
Northumberland	Cobourg	2.1	1.3	County Road 20 (Elgin Street)	
Northumberland	Cobourg	3.2	2.0	Highway 401 – Toronto, Kingston	Exit 474
Northumberland	Baltimore	7.7	4.8	County Road 74 (Dale Road)	
Northumberland	Baltimore	8.2	5.1	County Road 15 (Harwood Road) – Harwood	
Northumberland	Alnwick/Haldimand	14.5	9.0	County Road 22 (Centreton Road)	
Northumberland	Alnwick/Haldimand	21.7	13.5	County Road 9 west – Bewdley; County Road 29 east – Warkworth	
Northumberland	Alderville	27.6	17.1	County Road 18	
Northumberland	Roseneath	29.2	18.1	County Road 24	
Northumberland	Alnwick/Haldimand	30.9	19.2	Merill Road (formerly Northumberland County Road 33	
Northumberland	Hastings	44.4	27.6	County Road 25 (Langford Drive)	
Northumberland	Hastings	45.4	28.2	County Road 2 (Albert Street West)	
Peterborough	Norwood	53.1	33.0	County Road 42	
Peterborough	Norwood	54.1	33.6	Highway 7 – Peterborough, Ottawa	Trans-Canada Highway
1.000 mi = 1.609 km; 1.000 km = 0.621 mi
