= Northumberland Youth Advisory Council =

- Official NYAC logo.
- Type: Youth council
- Headquarters: Hamilton Township, Ontario
- Members: Youth ages 14-24
- Website: Official website

The Northumberland Youth Advisory Council, NYAC, is a government-related youth voice program in Northumberland County, Ontario. The council provides scholarships, sponsors youth philanthropy programs, and hosts an annual Youth Opportunities Expo. Several members have been noted for their individual contributions to the province of Ontario through the NYAC.

== About ==
The Northumberland Youth Advisory Council is improves social economic opportunities for young people in Northumberland. Goals include empowering and connecting young people through the creation of a Youth Council as an advisory voice to municipal government; to engage and retain youth as part of a sustainable youth strategy for Northumberland; to create an information forum that actively communicates and promotes opportunities for youth in business, politics and culture.

== Background ==
The Northumberland Youth Advisory Council was established in the fall of 2005. Composed of approximately 25 young people between the ages of 14 and 24 who represent various organizations throughout Northumberland, the organization is funded in part by the County of Northumberland. It is the first ever fully funded youth council in the history of Northumberland County.

== Membership ==
The membership is provided through a youth representative being forwarded by the Municipality of Brighton, Municipality (town) of Trent Hills, Town of Cobourg, Municipality of Port Hope, Township of Cramahe, Township of Alnwick/Haldimand, Township of Hamilton, Campbellford District High School, Cobourg District Collegiate Institute East, Cobourg Collegiate Institute West, and others.

The General Membership is a non-appointed position and is open to all youth ages 14 to 24 in Northumberland County. Its members assist the Directors in addressing those issues that impact youth.

== See also ==
- Youth voice
- Youth council
