= Kawartha Pine Ridge District School Board =

School board in Ontario, Canada

Location
- 1994 Fisher Drive, Peterborough, ON, K9J 7A1 Canada
- Coordinates: 44.25997°N 78.35179°W (HQ building)

District information
- Chief executive officer: Rita Russo
- Chair of the board: Paul Brown
- Schools: 73 elementary schools, 13 secondary schools, 3 adult learning centres
- Budget: CA$482 million (2023–2024)

Students and staff
- Students: approx. 35,000
- Staff: 3,800 full-time, 1,300 part-time

Other information
- Website: www.kprschools.ca

Kawartha Pine Ridge District School Board (known as English-language Public District School Board No. 14 prior to 1999) is a Canadian public, secular, English-language school board headquartered in Peterborough, Ontario. It extends from the Kawarthas south to Lake Ontario and from the City of Kawartha Lakes and the edge of the City of Oshawa east to Hastings County. In the 2024–2025 school year, it has more than 35,000 students in 89 schools. Paul Brown is board chair.

== History ==
Kawartha Pine Ridge District School Board, until 1999 English-language Public District School Board No. 14, was formed by the amalgamation of the Peterborough County Board of Education and the Northumberland-Clarington Board of Education.

== Schools ==
As of February 2025 the district school board has 89 schools: 73 elementary schools, 13 secondary schools with associated intermediate schools, and 3 adult/alternative learning centres. Secondary schools enroll grades 9–12; associated intermediate schools enroll grades 6–8 or 7–8.

=== Elementary schools ===
- Apsley Central Public School, Apsley
- Baltimore Public School, Baltimore
- Beatrice Strong Public School, Port Hope
- Brighton Public School, Brighton
- Buckhorn Public School, Buckhorn
- Burnham Public School, Cobourg
- Camborne Public School, Cobourg
- Central Public School, Bowmanville
- Charles Bowman Public School, Bowmanville
- Chemong Public School, Bridgenorth
- Colborne Public School, Colborne
- Courtice North Public School, Courtice
- C. R. Gummow Public School, Cobourg
- Dr. Emily Stowe Public School, Courtice
- Dr. G. J. MacGillivray Public School, Courtice
- Dr. Ross Tilley Public School, Bowmanville
- Duke of Cambridge Public School, Bowmanville
- Edmison Heights Public School, Peterborough
- Enniskillen Public School, Enniskillen
- Ganaraska Trail Public School, Port Hope
- Grafton Public School, Grafton
- Hampton Junior Public School, Hampton
- Harold Longworth Public School, Bowmanville
- Hastings Public School, Hastings
- Havelock-Belmont Public School, Havelock
- Highland Heights Public School, Peterborough
- Hillcrest Public School, Campbellford
- James Strath Public School, Peterborough
- John M. James Public School, Bowmanville
- Kaawaate East City Public School, Peterborough
- Kawartha Heights Public School, Peterborough
- Keith Wightman Public School, Peterborough
- Kent Public School, Campbellford
- Lakefield Intermediate Public School, Lakefield
- Lydia Trull Public School, Courtice
- M. J. Hobbs Senior Public School, Hampton
- Merwin Greer Public School, Cobourg
- Millbrook South Cavan Public School, Millbrook
- Murray Centennial Public School, Trenton
- Newcastle Public School, Newcastle
- North Cavan Public School, Cavan
- North Hope Central Public School, Campbellcroft
- North Shore Public School, Keene
- Northumberland Hills Public School, Castleton
- Norwood District Public School, Norwood
- Orono Public School, Orono
- Otonabee Valley Public School, Peterborough
- Percy Centennial Public School, Warkworth
- Plainville Public School, Gore's Landing
- Prince of Wales Public School, Peterborough
- Queen Elizabeth Public School, Peterborough
- Queen Mary Public School, Peterborough
- R. F. Downey Public School, Peterborough
- Roger Neilson Public School, Peterborough
- Roseneath Public School, Roseneath
- S. T. Worden Public School, Courtice
- Smithfield Public School, Brighton
- Spring Valley Public School, Brighton
- Stockdale Public School, Frankford
- Terry Fox Public School, Cobourg
- Vincent Massey Public School, Bowmanville
- Warsaw Public School, Warsaw
- Waverley Public School, Bowmanville
- Westmount Public School, Peterborough

=== Intermediate schools ===
- Adam Scott Intermediate School, Peterborough
- Clarington Central Intermediate School, Bowmanville
- Courtice Intermediate School, Courtice
- Crestwood Intermediate School, Cavan Monaghan
- Dale Road Senior Public School, Cobourg
- Dr. M.S. Hawkins Senior Public School, Port Hope
- Kenner Intermediate School, Peterborough
- Norwood District Intermediate School, Norwood
- The Pines Senior Public School, Newcastle

=== Secondary schools ===
- Adam Scott Collegiate and Vocational Institute, Peterborough
- Bowmanville High School, Bowmanville
- Campbellford District High School, Campbellford
- Clarington Central Secondary School, Bowmanville
- Clarke High School, Newcastle
- Cobourg Collegiate Institute, Cobourg
- Courtice Secondary School, Courtice
- Crestwood Secondary School, Peterborough
- East Northumberland Secondary School, Brighton
- Kenner Collegiate Vocational Institute, Peterborough
- Norwood District High School, Norwood
- Port Hope High School, Port Hope
- Thomas A. Stewart Secondary School, Peterborough

=== Continuing education centres ===
- Clarington Centre for Individual Studies, Bowmanville
- Northumberland Centre for Individual Studies, Cobourg
- Peterborough Alternative and Continuing Education Program, Peterborough

French immersion classes are offered in 14 elementary schools, an extended French program in 3 elementary schools, and an Anishinaabemowin language program in 5 schools.

To correct imbalances in enrollment, the board is changing some school boundaries in the 2020s. The Pines Senior Public School and Clarke High School in Newcastle are to be replaced with a new K–12 school building on a different site. A new school is to open in the Northglen neighborhood of Bowmanville in September 2025. The Ontario Ministry of Education has also approved funding for a new elementary school in Millbrook.

== Trustees ==
The board has 13 members: ten elected trustees, one First Nations appointed trustee, and two student trustees.

== See also ==
- Peterborough Victoria Northumberland and Clarington Catholic District School Board
- List of school districts in Ontario
- List of high schools in Ontario
