= NYAC =

NYAC is the initialism for:

- New York Athletic Club
- Northumberland Youth Advisory Council, Ontario, Canada
