= Clarke High School (Ontario) =

Clarke High School (The Pines @ Clarke)
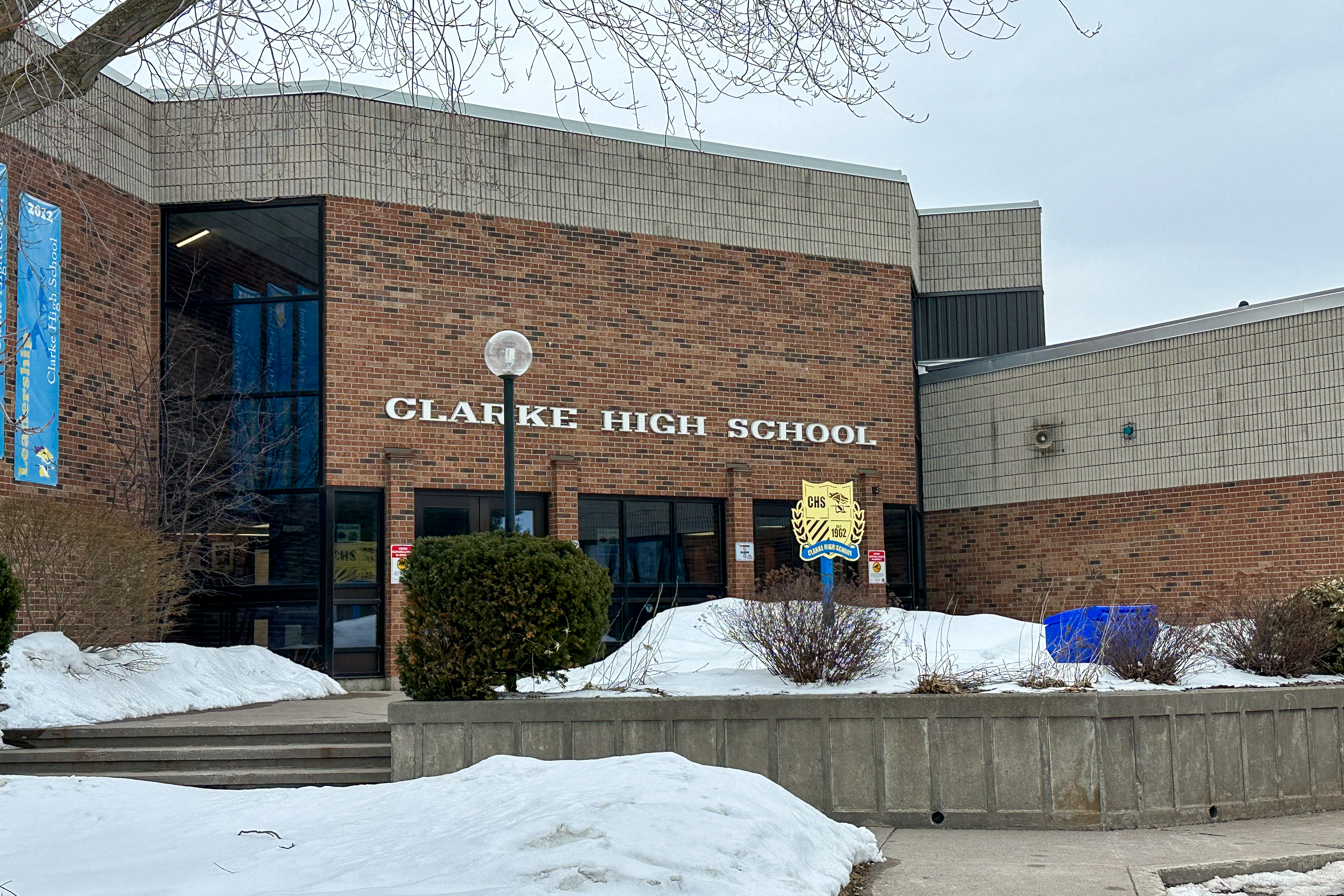
- Clarke High School in 2026

Location
- 3425 Highway 35/115; Newcastle, Ontario, L1B 0R7; Canada
- Coordinates: 43.9433°N 78.6017°W

Information
- Type: Public
- Established: 1962
- School district: Kawartha Pine Ridge District School Board
- Superintendent: Sonal Gohil
- Principal: Karen Cummings
- Staff: 13 (2026)
- Faculty: 14 (2026)
- Grades: 7-12
- Enrollment: 132 (2026)
- Colors: Blue, Yellow.
- Mascot: Horse
- Website: clarke.kprdsb.ca

Clarke High School (The Pines @ Clarke) is a public secondary school (and primary holding school) in Newcastle, Ontario, Canada, within the Kawartha Pine Ridge District School Board. It is the only secondary school in Newcastle, and has three feeder schools: Newcastle Public School, Orono Public School, and The Pines Senior Public School. It is currently holding overflow students from Grade 7 and 8 that have been forced out of their elementary school due to lack of school construction in Ontario.

== See also ==
- List of high schools in Ontario
