= Hamilton Township, Ontario =

Hamilton
- Township (lower-tier)
- Township of Hamilton
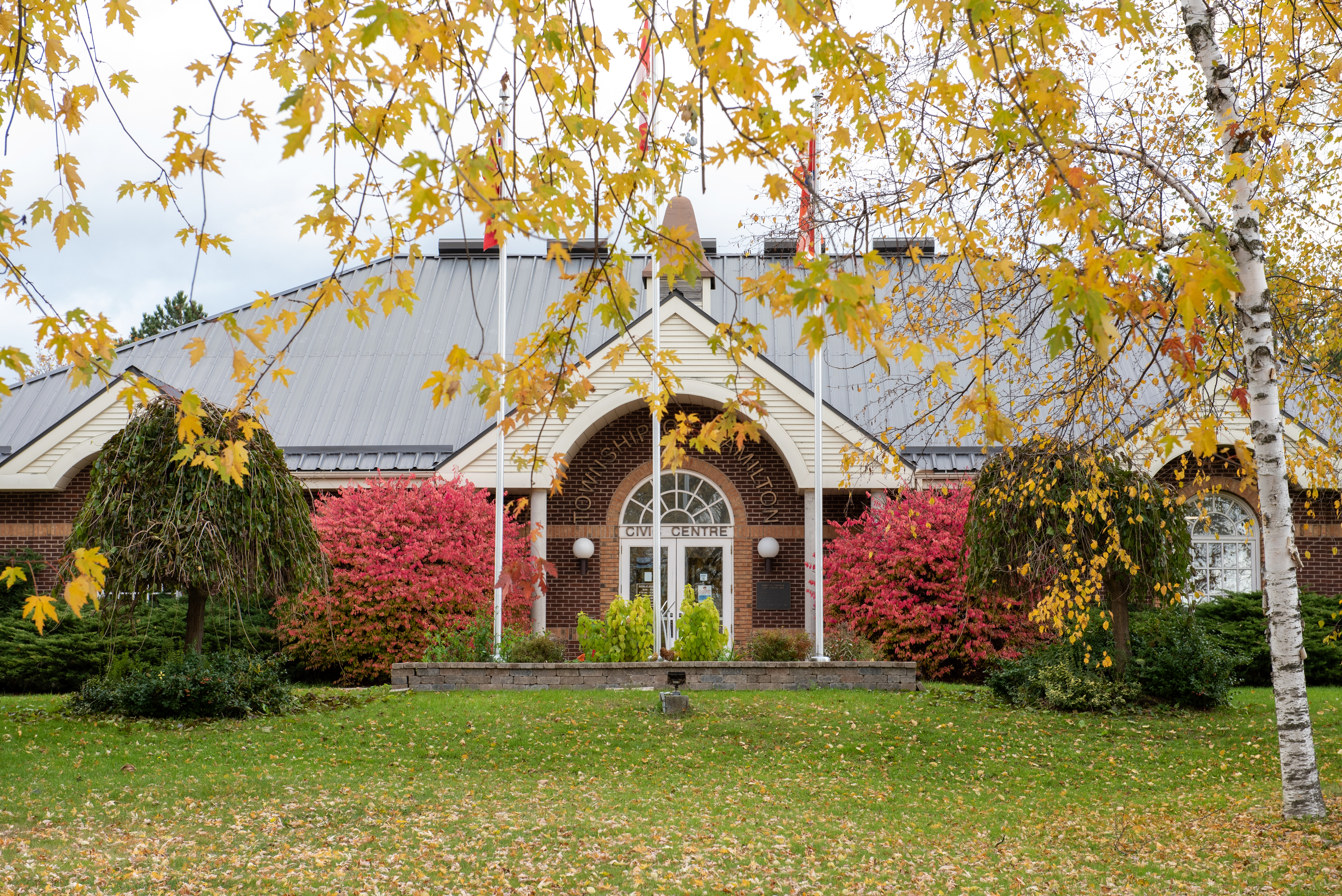
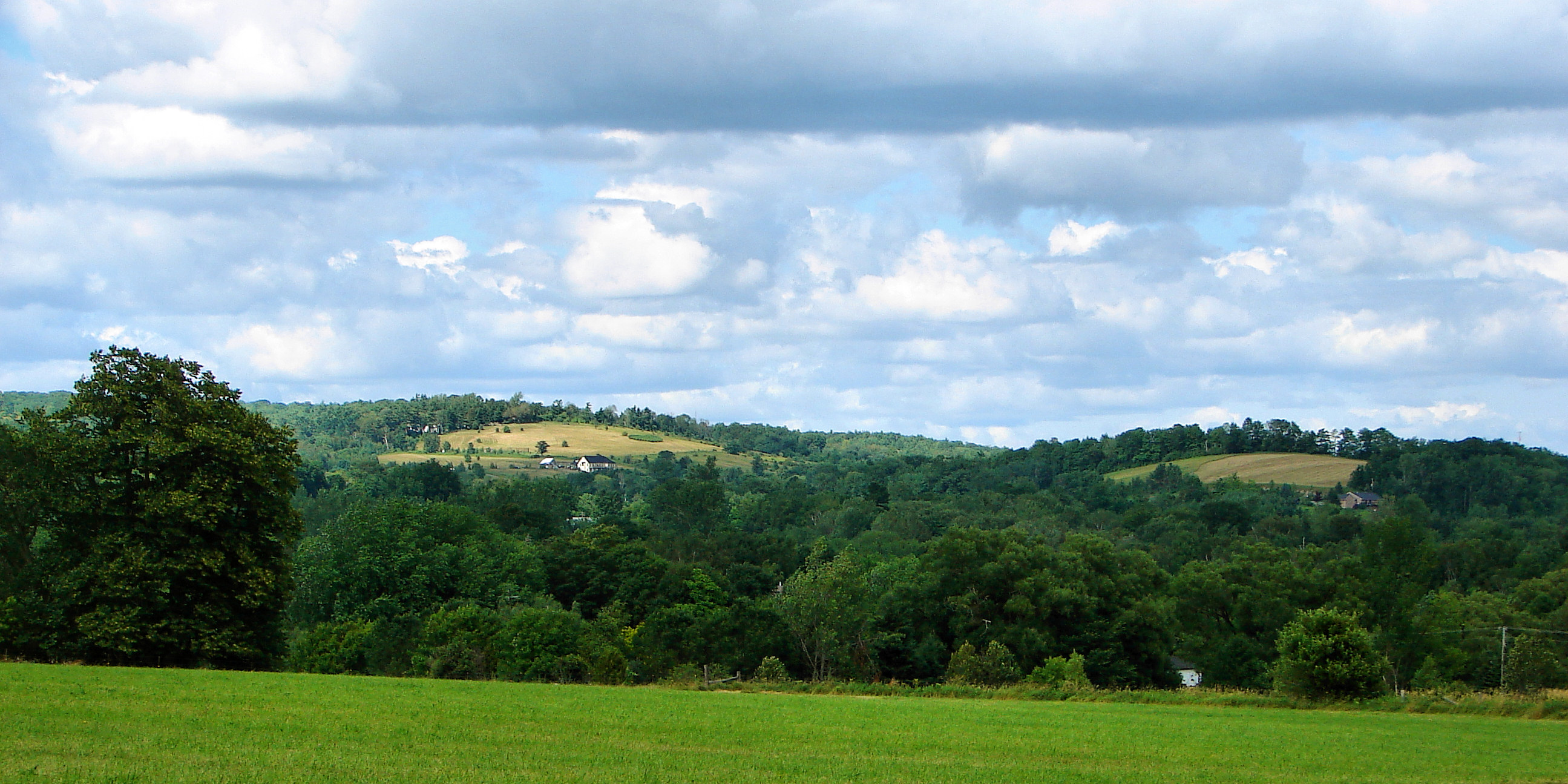
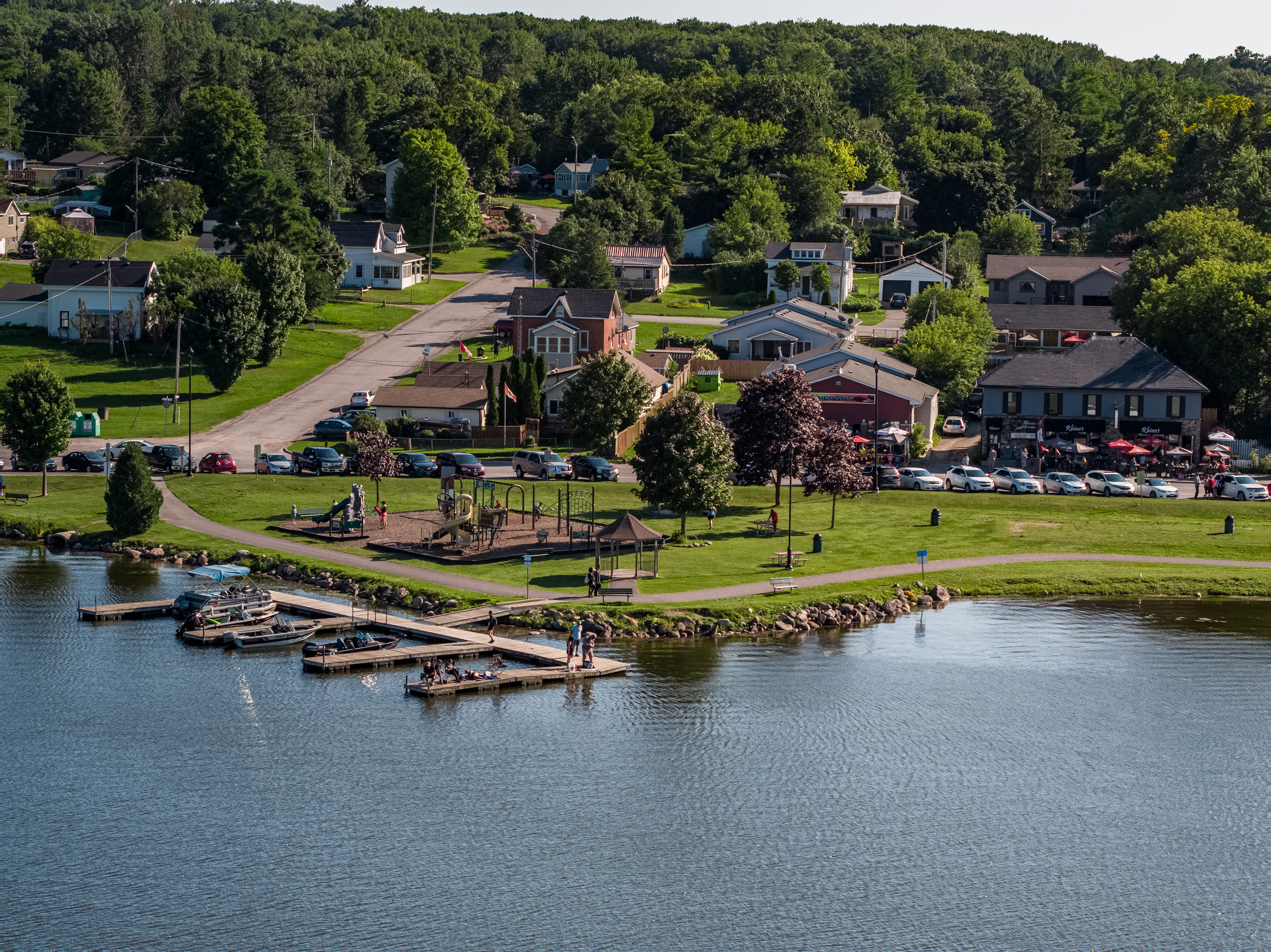
- Township of Hamilton Municipal Office Countryside near Baltimore Downtown Bewdley

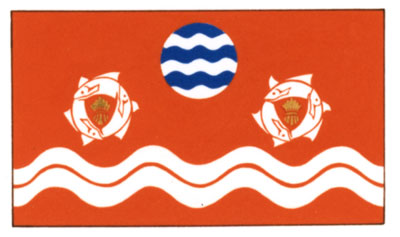
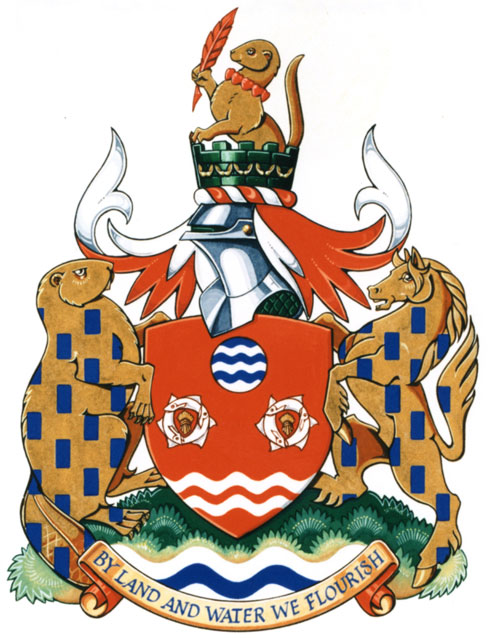
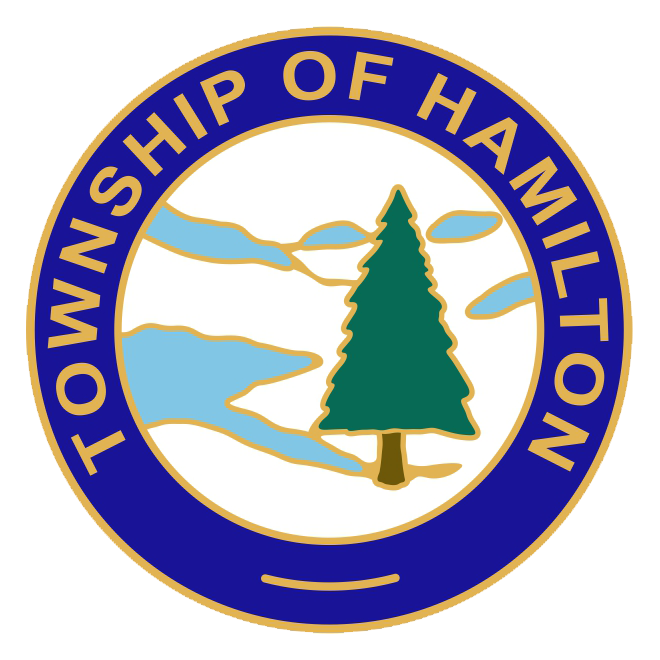
- Flag Coat of arms Logo
- Motto(s): By land and water we flourish
- Location within Northumberland County Location within Southern Ontario
- Coordinates: 44°03′N 78°13′W
- Country: Canada
- Province: Ontario
- County: Northumberland
- Settled: 1791
- Incorporated: 1850

Government
  - Type: Township
  - Mayor: Scott Jibb
  - Fed. riding: Northumberland—Clarke
  - Prov. riding: Northumberland—Peterborough South

Area
  - Land: 256.03 km^{2} (98.85 sq mi)

Population (2021)
  - Total: 11,059
  - Density: 43.2/km^{2} (112/sq mi)
- Area codes: 905, 289, 365, and 742
- Website: www.hamiltontownship.ca

Map of Rice Lake and environs

Hamilton Township is a lower-tier municipality located in Northumberland County in central Ontario. It surrounds the Town of Cobourg, located between Rice Lake and Lake Ontario. Neighbouring municipalities include the Town of Port Hope and Township of Alnwick-Haldimand. The township encompasses a mostly rural landscape of agricultural land, forests, wetlands, and waterfront communities, including the Oak Ridges Moraine.

== History ==
Prior to European settlement, the area was traditionally inhabited by the Mississauga Anishinaabeg. The Township lies within territory covered by the Williams Treaties of 1923. The Township of Hamilton was incorporated in 1850 and includes the communities of Baltimore, Bewdley, Camborne, Cold Springs, Gores Landing, Harwood, Plainville, and Precious Corners.

=== Early Settlement and Community Development ===
The Township of Hamilton was surveyed in 1791. After this date, United Empire Loyalists and other settlers began moving into the region, including the area that is present-day Cobourg.

One of the earliest settlements was Baltimore, founded by John McCarthy in 1805 and named after his family's ancestral home in County Cork, Ireland. The village developed around agricultural activity and later had a variety of mills and small industries that served the surrounding community.

Bewdley originated in the 1820s as a tavern settlement called Black's Landing, named after William Black the tavern owner. The village's development is largely credited to William Bancks, who purchased several lots in the area in 1831. He then laid out residential plots for a village he called Bewdley after his home town of Bewdley, Worcestershire, England.

During the 1830s William Hore emigrated from Camborne, Cornwall, England and established the settlement that became Camborne. Often proclaimed by residents as the “First Mayor of Camborne”, Hore established homes, a sawmill, the community's first church, side roads, and a pail and tub factory. Camborne is also home to the Old Camborne School House, a one-room schoolhouse built in 1895 and restored in 1995. It remains the only one-room school left in the township that has not been sold or renovated into a private home.

Rice Lake played an important role in the township's development. In 1844, Thomas Gore purchased a large parcel of land at Rice Lake that is now the village of Gore's Landing. In 1846 he surveyed and supervised construction of the Cobourg to Rice Lake plank road, now County Road 18, except for a short bit in the village named Plank Road. Gore's Landing is also noted for being a popular destination for artists and writers.

Other communities developed around agriculture, transportation, and local industry. Cold Springs became a popular stopping place for travellers moving between Cobourg and Rice Lake. Travel was greatly improved after the introduction of the plank road. Precious Corners was named after the Precious family, who settled in the township in 1829.

Harwood was purchased in 1828 by and named after Vivien Harwood, a land owner who never visited the area. The area began to develop rapidly in 1854 due to the proposal of the Cobourg-Peterborough Railway which would stop in Harwood before crossing Rice Lake. Throughout the nineteenth and twentieth centuries, Hamilton Township remained predominantly agricultural, with villages functioning as industrial hubs for rural residents.

=== Indigenous History ===
Archaeological evidence indicates that Indigenous peoples have occupied the area now forming Hamilton Township for approximately 11,000 years, following the melting of the Wisconsin glacier. Successive Indigenous cultures, including Paleoindian, Archaic, and later Iroquois, utilized the region's abundant natural resources. By the seventeenth century, the area formed part of a broader Indigenous landscape used by both Huron and Haudenosaunee peoples.

Prior to European settlement, Hamilton Township was part of the traditional territory of the Michi Saagiig (Mississauga) Anishinaabeg, who inhabited lands throughout the Bay of Quinte region and along the north shore of Lake Ontario. Following the American Revolution and the settlement of Loyalists in Upper Canada, the Mississauga were involved in an early series of “land surrenders” that facilitated colonial expansion.

In the mid-1830s, a group of Michi Saagiig Anishinaabeg relocated from Grape Island in the Bay of Quinte to the Rice Lake area, where the Alderville First Nation was established. The community continued long-standing Indigenous land stewardship practice of the area, including controlled burning, which helped maintain the Tallgrass Prairie and Black Oak Savanna ecosystems of the Rice Lake Plains. Despite nineteenth-century assimilation policies, the community preserved important elements of their culture including the Ojibwe language and other traditions. Alderville First Nation continues to maintain cultural and historical connections to Rice Lake and the surrounding lands, including present-day Hamilton Township.

== Etymology ==
The township was named after Henry Hamilton, Lieutenant-Governor of Quebec from 1782 to 1785. The name was adopted shortly after 1791, when Upper Canada was created and divided into townships.

The township's name predates that of the nearby City of Hamilton, which was later established and named independently after George Hamilton, who laid out the first plan for the town in 1820. This has resulted in occasional confusion between the two municipalities.

== Geography ==
=== Geographical Features ===
An important environmental feature of the Township of Hamilton is the Oak Ridges Moraine which was formed approximately 12,000 years ago due to the recession of the Simcoe and Ontario lobes of the Wisconsin glacier. The recession left behind a ridge of rocks, sand, gravel, and clay that now forms the Oak Ridges Moraine and serves as a drainage divide between the Lake Ontario and Georgian Bay basins. A unique feature of the Oak Ridges Moraine in the Township of Hamilton is the Rice Lake Plains, which has been described as the easternmost prairie ecosystem in Canada. The plains have existed since the melting of the Wisconsin glacier and are now extensively used for agriculture. Upon arrival in the Rice Lake region, the Michi Saagiig continued long-standing Indigenous land stewardship practices, including controlled burning used by earlier Haudenosaunee communities. These practices maintained open meadows, prairies, and savannas and contributed to the persistence of Tallgrass Prairie and Black Oak Savanna ecosystems. The area became known as “Pamitaashkodeyong”, which translates to “where it burns and where it travels” or “lake of the burning plains”, due to the reflection of the flames on the water of Rice Lake. The Alderville Black Oak Savanna organization continues ecological burning to preserve these biologically important ecosystems and fire-dependent plant species.

The abundance of freshwater, accredited to the formation of the Oak Ridges Moraine was an important factor in the early settlement of the township. Villages were established where water was available for power and transportation. Freshwater features include Lake Ontario, Rice Lake (Ontario), rivers, streams, as well as freshwater springs found throughout the township. The springs originating in the Oak Ridges Moraine are the sources for the wetlands in the township, including the Bewdley wetlands which are classified as Provincially Significant Wetlands (level 1) under the Ontario Ministry of Natural Resources wetlands evaluation system.

=== Communities ===
The Township of Hamilton is composed of eight hamlets - Baltimore, Bewdley, Camborne, Cold Springs, Gores Landing, Harwood, Plainville (44.077°N 78.243°W), and Precious Corners (44.015°N 78.201°W).

== Education ==
Public education in the Township of Hamilton is under the management of the Kawartha Pine Ridge District School Board. Students from the Township attend high school in the Town of Cobourg, at either Cobourg Collegiate Institute or St. Mary Catholic Secondary School.

=== Elementary Schools ===
- Baltimore Public School, JK - 6
- Camborne Public School, JK - 6
- Dale Road Senior Public School, 7 - 8
- Northumberland Montessori School, ages 2.5 - 14
- Plainville Public School, JK- 6

== Attractions ==
Rice Lake makes up the northern border of the Township of Hamilton and is popular for its fishing, boating, cottaging, and outdoor recreation. Rice Lake, part of the Trent-Severn Waterway, is one of Ontario's largest and most productive inland fisheries and boasts large cohorts of Muskies, as well as Largemouth Bass and Walleye. In the winter, Rice Lake is a top destination for winter anglers, and is known for its plentiful jumbo perch, crappie, and blue gill. Surrounding Rice Lake are multiple waterfront cottages, trailer parks, and public parks. Waterfront parks in the Township of Hamilton include:

- Bewdley Optimist Park
- Gores Landing Waterfront Park
- Harwood Waterfront Park

The Township of Hamilton was also home to the Port Hope Drive in, which was the longest continually operating drive-in theatre in Canada before shutting down in 2023. The drive-in opened in 1947, one year after Canada's first drive-in theatre Skyway Theatre in Stoney Creek.

== Notable people ==
- Mina Benson Hubbard, Explorer and writer
- Kate Current, Athlete
- John David Kelly, Artist
- Archibald Lampman, Poet
- Susanna Moodie, Writer
- Derwyn Owen, Anglican Primate of All Canada (1876–1947)
- Catharine Parr Traill, Writer
- Joseph M. Scriven, Poet
- Letitia Youmans, Teacher and activist

== Demographics ==
In the 2021 Census of Population conducted by Statistics Canada, Hamilton Township had a population of 11,059 living in 4,281 of its 4,685 total private dwellings, a change of 1.1% from its 2016 population of 10,942. With a land area of 256.03 km^{2} (98.85 sq mi), it had a population density of 43.2/km^{2} (111.9/sq mi) in 2021.

Canada census – Hamilton Township community profile

	2021	2016	2011
Population	11,059 (+1.1% from 2016)	10,942 (+2.2% from 2011)	10,702 (-2.5% from 2006)
Land area	256.03 km^{2} (98.85 sq mi)	256.08 km^{2} (98.87 sq mi)	256.12 km^{2} (98.89 sq mi)
Population density	43.2/km^{2} (112/sq mi)	42.7/km^{2} (111/sq mi)	41.8/km^{2} (108/sq mi)
Median age	49.6 (M: 49.2, F: 50.0)	49.1 (M: 49.0, F: 49.2)
Private dwellings	4,685 (total) 4,281 (occupied)	4,677 (total)	4,377 (total)
Median household income	$106,000	$88,124

References: 2021 2016 2011

Historical census populations – Hamilton Township

Year	Pop.	±%
1871	5,721	—
1881	5,155	−9.9%
1891	4,313	−16.3%
1901	3,623	−16.0%
1911	3,414	−5.8%
1921	3,026	−11.4%
1931	2,848	−5.9%
1941	2,759	−3.1%

Year	Pop.	±%
1951	3,210	+16.3%
1956	4,088	+27.4%
1961	5,057	+23.7%
1966	5,985	+18.4%
1971	7,034	+17.5%
1976	8,835	+25.6%
1981	8,809	−0.3%
1986	7,634	−13.3%

Year	Pop.	±%
1991	9,616	+26.0%
1996	10,140	+5.4%
2001	10,785	+6.4%
2006	10,972	+1.7%
2011	10,702	−2.5%
2016	10,942	+2.2%
2021	11,059	+1.1%

Population counts are not adjusted for boundary changes.
Source: Statistics Canada

Mother tongue (2021):

- English as first language: 94.0%
- French as first language: 1.1%
- English and French as first language: 0.3%
- Other as first language: 4.2%

== Gallery ==
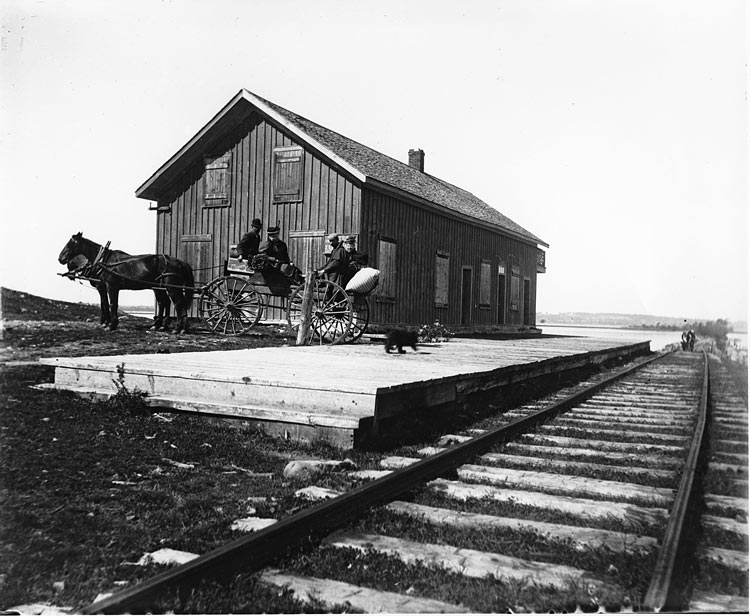
Harwood Station ca.1900

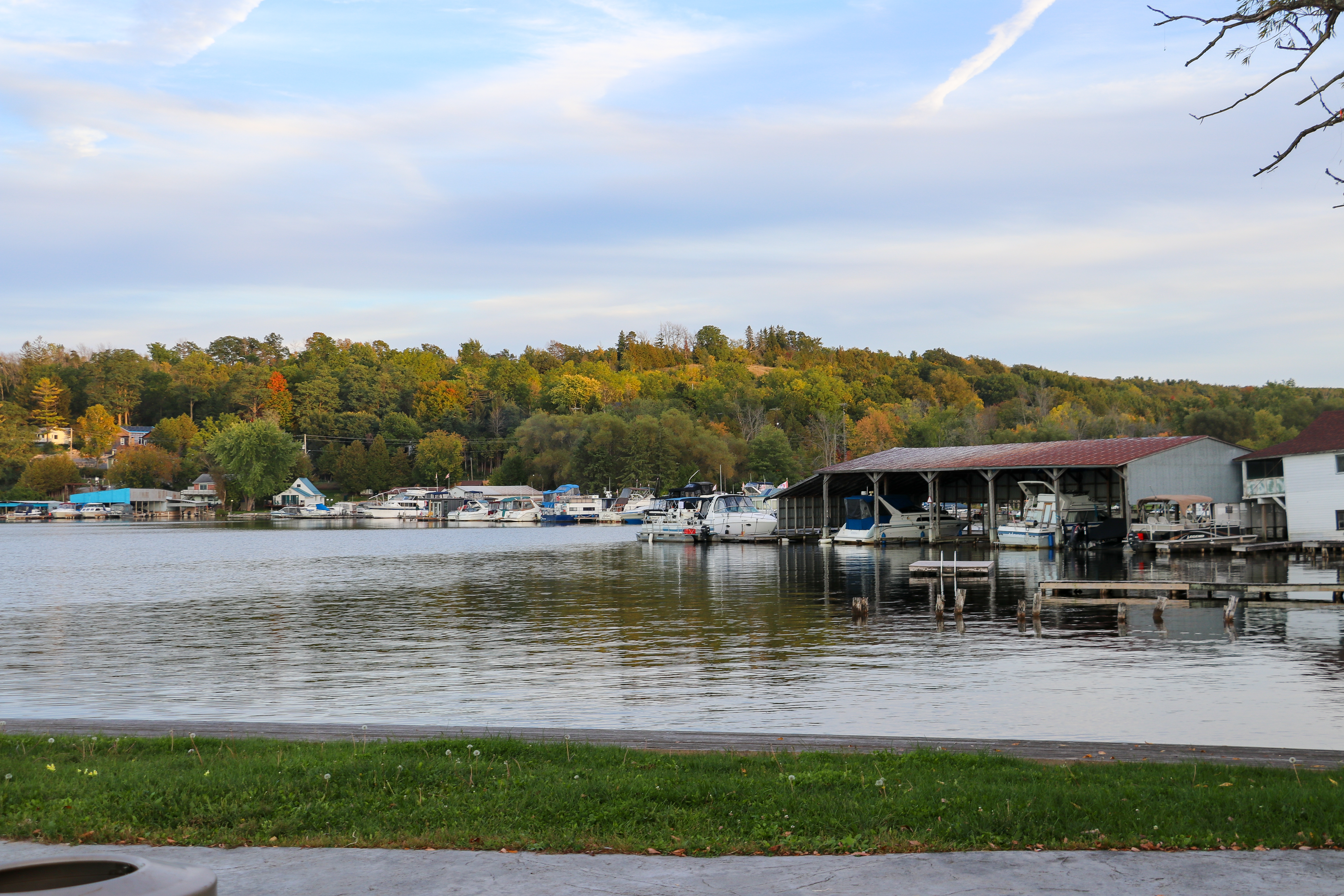
Gores Landing marina

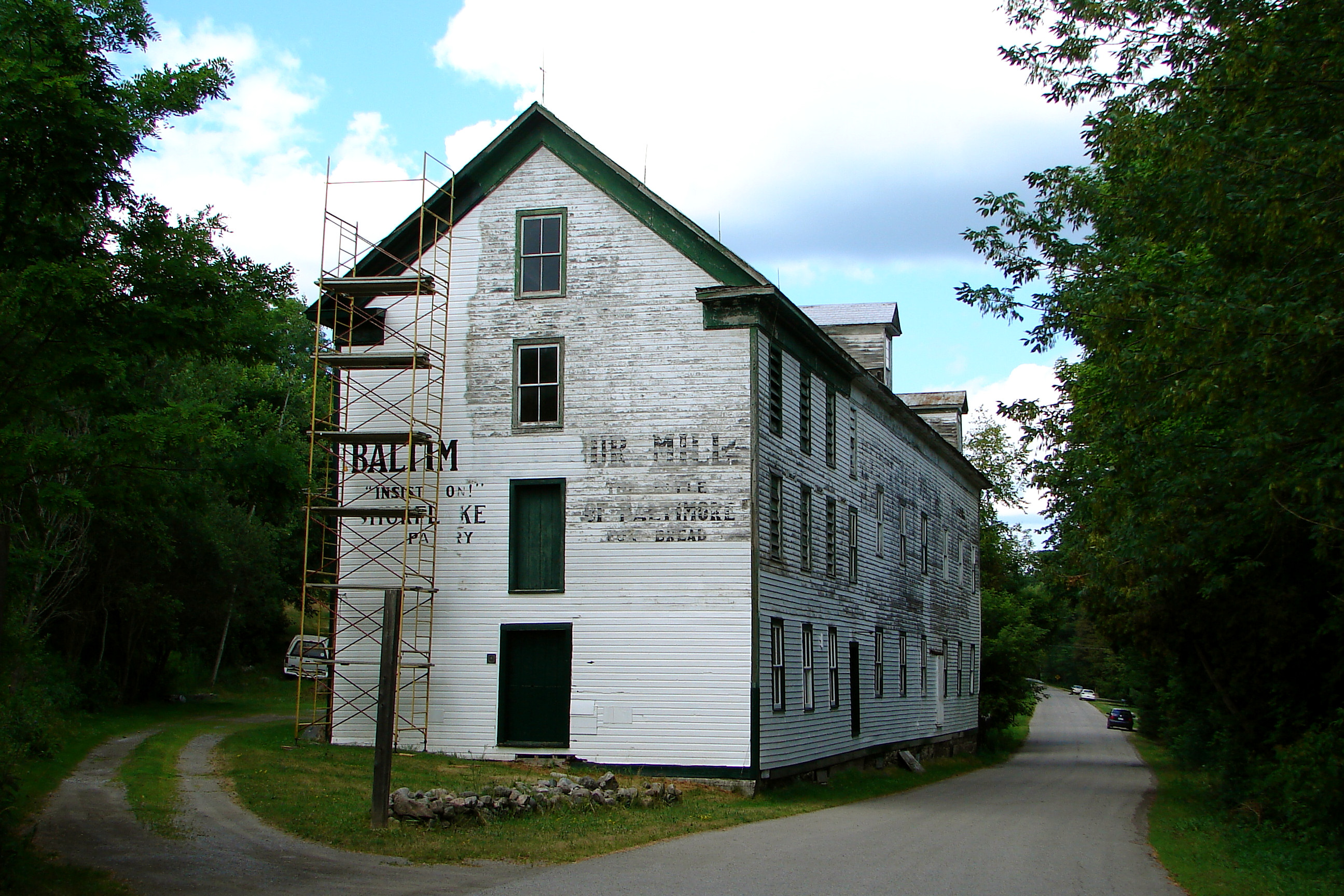
Ball's Mill in Baltimore

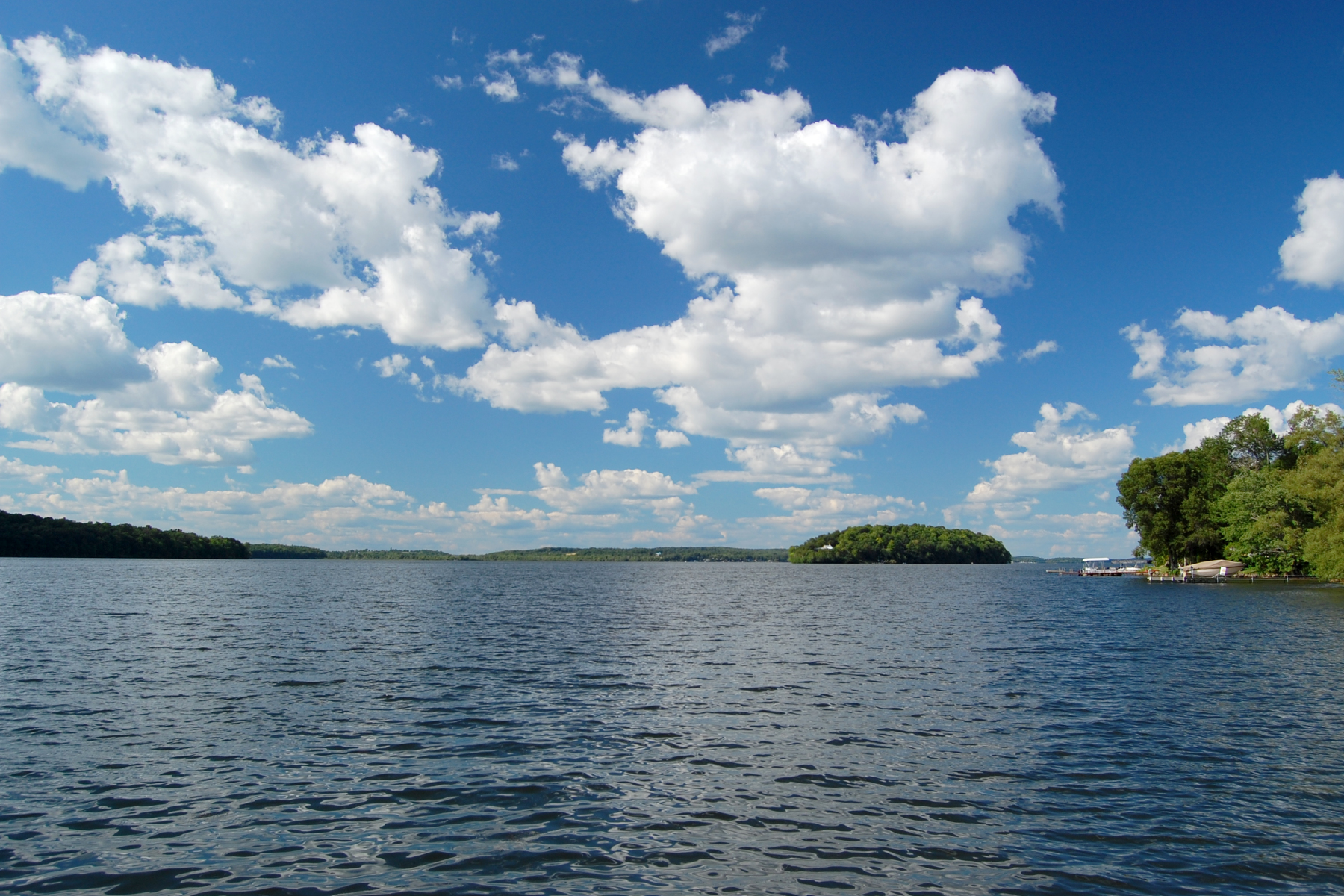
View of Rice Lake in Gores Landing

== See also ==
- List of townships in Ontario
