= Ada Gladys Killins =

Canadian artist and educator (1901–1963)

Ada Gladys Killins (1901 – 1963) was a Canadian artist and educator.

The daughter of Robert Killins and Rachel Swick, she was born in Castor township, Lincoln County, Ontario. She attended teacher's college and began teaching art at Memorial School in Niagara Falls in 1924. For a number of years, she took art classes in summer at the Ontario College of Art. She also took private lessons with Franz Johnston and later took summer classes with Carl Schaefer on Lake Couchiching between 1935 and 1938. In 1947, she retired from teaching to paint full-time, moving into a cabin near Orangeville.

Killins was a member of the Canadian Society of Painters in Water Colour and exhibited with them regularly. In 1939, her work was shown at the Canadian National Exhibition in Toronto and one of her paintings was included in the Canadian pavilion at the 1939 New York World's Fair. In 1942, fifteen of her paintings were included in the exhibition "Four Canadian Painters" at the Art Gallery of Ontario. She is best-known for her landscapes in watercolour.

In 1963, she was murdered in Castleton, Ontario, by her brother Robert Killins. During that attack, Robert also killed his pregnant estranged wife, Florence, his pregnant daughter Pearl Campbell, and Patsy, Florence's six year old daughter. Pearl's husband Fred, Florence's partner Tom Major, and neighbor Peter Miller were wounded.
