= Ontario Highway 44 =

Former Ontario provincial highway

King's Highway 44
- Lanark County Road 49; Ottawa Road 49

Route information
- Maintained by Ministry of Transportation of Ontario
- Length: 15.9 km (9.9 mi)
- Existed: April 13, 1938–March 31, 1997

Major junctions
- West end: Highway 15 in Almonte
- East end: Highway 17 near Carp

Location
- Country: Canada
- Province: Ontario
- Counties: Lanark County
- Regions: Ottawa–Carleton
- Towns: Almonte, Carp

Highway system
- Ontario provincial highways; Current; Former; 400-series
← Highway 41	→ Highway 48
Former provincial highways
← Highway 43	Highway 45 →

King's Highway 44, commonly referred to as Highway 44, was a provincially maintained highway in the Canadian province of Ontario. The 15.9-kilometre (9.9 mi)-long route began at Highway 15 in the town of Almonte and travelled eastward through Lanark County towards Ottawa, ending at Highway 17 (now Highway 417). Highway 44 was assumed by the province in 1938 along existing unimproved roadway. A significant portion of the highway was incorporated into a new routing of Highway 17 in 1966. The highway alignment remained generally unchanged for the next three decades until it was decommissioned in 1997 and transferred to Lanark County and what is now the City of Ottawa. The road has since been redesignated as Lanark County Road 49 and Ottawa Road 49.

== Route description ==
Highway 44 began at Highway 15 in Almonte and proceeded east for 15.9 km (9.9 mi) to Highway 17 southwest of Carp. Within Almonte, the road was known as Ottawa Street and Main Street; east of there it became March Road. Today, the route is known as Lanark County Road 49 and Ottawa Road 49.

At the time of its decommissioning, Highway 44 began at a junction with Highway 15 (Christian Street) on the west side of Almonte. It crossed the Mississippi River, where it became Main Street and passed through the central portion of the town. In the eastern edge of Almonte, it was known Ottawa Street until Appleton Sideroad, where it became March Road and continued eastward in a straight line through farmland in the Ottawa Valley. It also passed through several forests as well as south of Greensmere Golf and Country Club before meeting what was then Highway 17 at an intersection but is now an interchange with Highway 417 (Exit 155)., although for a very brief 3-year period between 1994 and 1997, Highway 44's official northern terminus was at the Highway 417 interchange after Highway 17 between Highway 7 west of Kanata and the northern terminus of Highway 44 and the former southern terminus of what was then Ottawa-Carleton Regional Road 49 was twinned, increasing the length of Highway 417 by an additional 7 km.

== History ==
Highway 44 was established by the Department of Highways, predecessor to the Ministry of Transportation, on April 13, 1938, by assuming ownership of existing county road between Almonte and Carp. When Highway 44 was assumed, the highway between Carleton Place and Arnprior was known as Highway 29. From the junction of these two highways, the route was paved eastward into Almonte already, but remained a gravel road elsewhere. On November 9, 1965, the new Carp Bypass – a portion of Highway 17 designed to replace the old meandering route (now known as Donald B. Munro Drive) through Carp, Marathon and Antrim – opened. As a result, the eastern end of Highway 44 was truncated by approximately 7 km (4.3 mi) to the new bypass Highway 44 remained generally unchanged until March 31, 1997, when the entire route was decommissioned and transferred to Lanark County and the Regional Municipality of Ottawa–Carleton, which later became the City of Ottawa. It has since been known as Lanark County Road 49 and Ottawa Road 49.

== Major intersections ==
The following table lists the major junctions along Highway 44, as noted by the Ministry of Transportation of Ontario.

Division	Location	km	mi	Destinations	Notes
Lanark	Almonte	0.0	0.0	Highway 15 (Christian Street) – Carleton Place	Now Lanark County Road 29
Lanark	Almonte	1.4	0.87	County Road 17 (Martin Street North); County Road 16A south (Queen Street)	
Lanark	Almonte	2.8	1.7	County Road 17 south (Appleton Side Road)	
Ottawa		8.2	5.1	Road 3 (Upper Dwyer Hill Road)	
Ottawa		15.9	9.9	Highway 17 – Ottawa, North Bay	Now Highway 417 exit 155
1.000 mi = 1.609 km; 1.000 km = 0.621 mi
