= Bowmanville High School =

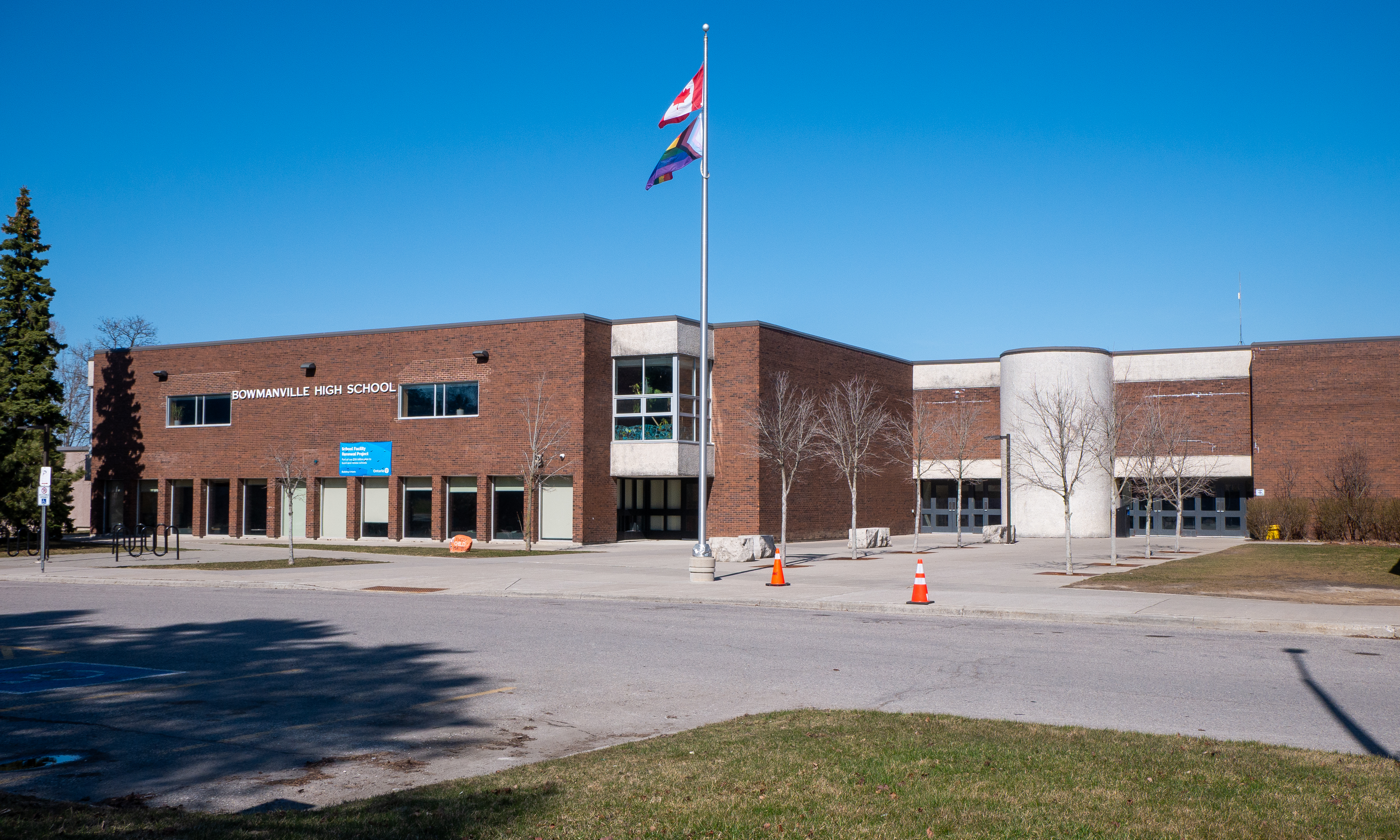
- Bowmanville High School in 2025

Location
- 49 Liberty Street North; Bowmanville, Ontario, L1C 2L8; Canada; 43.914976°N 78.680075°W

Information
- Type: Public Secondary School
- Motto: Non Quantum Sed Quale
- Opened: 1890, 1972
- School district: Kawartha Pine Ridge District School Board
- Superintendent: Jamila Maliha
- Principal: David Boone
- Grades: 9-12
- Enrollment: 945 (2019/2020)
- Colours: Red and Black
- Mascot: Hootie (old), Screech (new)
- Yearbook: Screech Owl (1922 - 1934, 1949 - 1995), Theme based every year (1996 - Present)
- Website: bowmanvillehigh.kprdsb.ca

Bowmanville High School (also known as BHS) is a public secondary school located in Bowmanville, Ontario, Canada, within the Kawartha Pine Ridge District School Board. The school includes Grades 9 – 12, and offers a French Immersion program. The principal at Bowmanville High School is David Boone. The current location was established and opened to students in September 1972.

== History ==
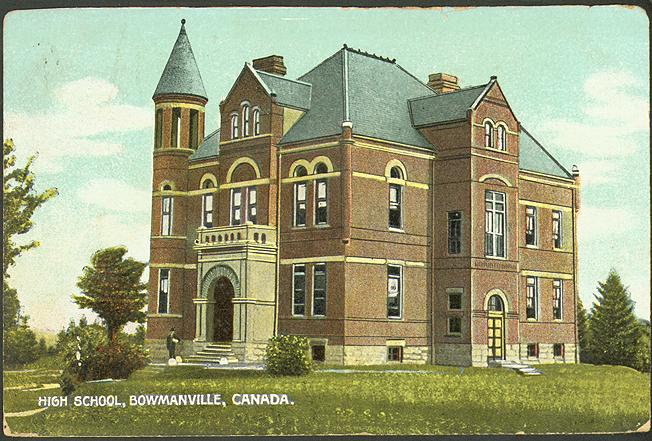
Drawing of Bowmanville High School, 1910

=== Bowmanville High School 1890 - 1972 ===
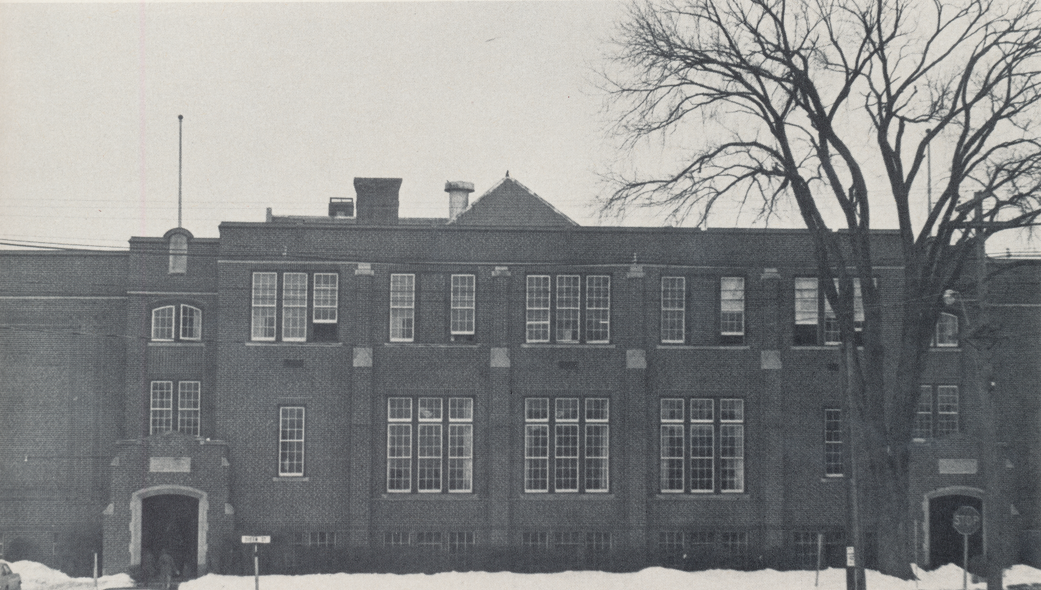
Photo of first addition to Bowmanville High School, 1972

The original Bowmanville High School was built and opened on December 12, 1890. It was located closer to downtown Bowmanville on Queen Street, at the end of Division Street south. By the late 1920s, the school was overcrowded. In 1929, a storm damaged the original belfry which resulted in its removal. At the same time, the high school had an addition to the front, opening on February 1, 1930. This provided new facilities for the students and more space. Over time, it became more crowded again. The second addition was added to the back, starting in 1954 and finishing in 1957. Due to steelwork shortage and poor constructing, it took 4 years to complete. This section opened on November 28 of the year. With an aging school, not enough modern facilities and overcrowding once again with portables being needed, a new school was built to replace it. It closed at the end of the school year in June 1972.

=== Bowmanville High School 1972 - Present ===
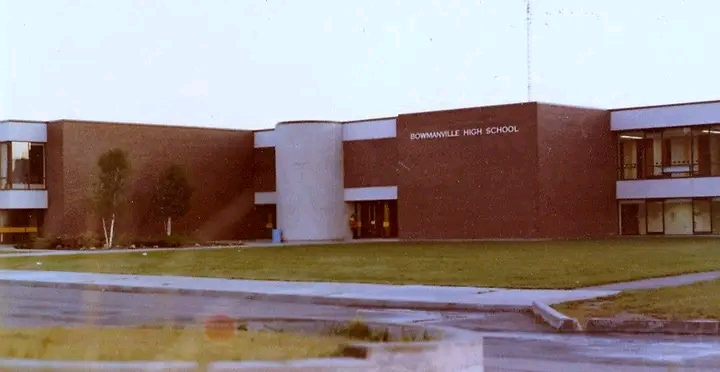
Photo of New Bowmanville High School, 1977

In 1972, the high school moved to its current location on Liberty Street, leaving the original building empty. The school has undergone many changes over time inside and outside. In 1975, tennis courts were installed beside the north parking lot. In 1981, the Newcastle Fitness Centre (Later Clarington), nicknamed Splash from the original SPLASH committee who fundraised the establishment of it, opened on February 6 of that year. It was built on the west side of the school, resulting in the original windows being removed and/or covered. Sometime between 1983 - 1987, an elevator was installed in the old coat room. The original woodshop room was renovated into the photography room, and the electrical workshop became the new woodshop in the late 1980s as well. The north parking lot was expanded upon and the tennis courts were relocated for portables to be added (up to 20 at one point). The front exterior was changed up in 1995 to add more art to the school. More changes to add a raised garden bed and seating was added in the early 2000s. During the 2000s, many renovations were done to the interior of the school, and have continued every year in phases over the summers. Duke of Cambridge was built and opened in September 2013, which resulted in the removal of the tennis courts and the paving of the south side of the school. In 2014, the Clarington Fitness Centre was renovated and had an addition to add a family changeroom, a second staircase and elevator at the front. In honor of the late Alan Strike, a huge contributor to the funding of the SPLASH committee, it re-opened as the Alan Strike Aquatic and Squash Centre. The front was later changed again and removed all art, the garden and paved it.

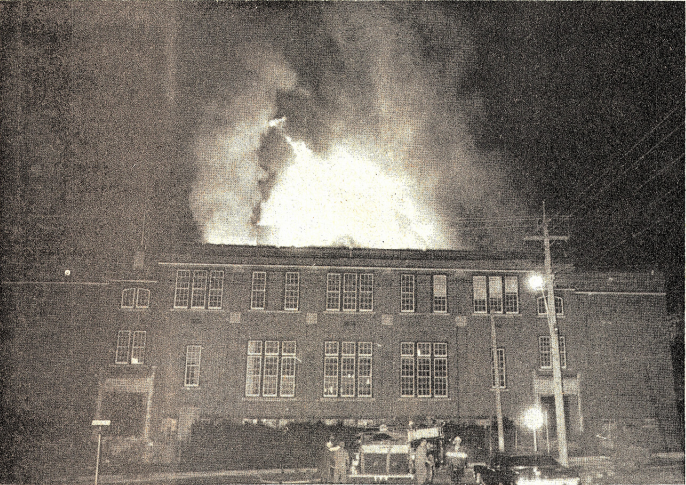
BHS on fire shortly after 911 called, 1974

=== Old Bowmanville High School Fire ===
On October 6 1974, the school was a victim of arson that hit early in the morning which burned down the 1890 building and roof of the 1930 addition. While the 1890 section was slated for demolition, the 1930 section was going to be kept for repurposing. It took all day to put out the fire after it kept rekindling. The repair work to replace the roof and recover from water damage cost hundreds of thousands of dollars. This left only part of the 1890 basement, the 1930 and 1957 additions standing.

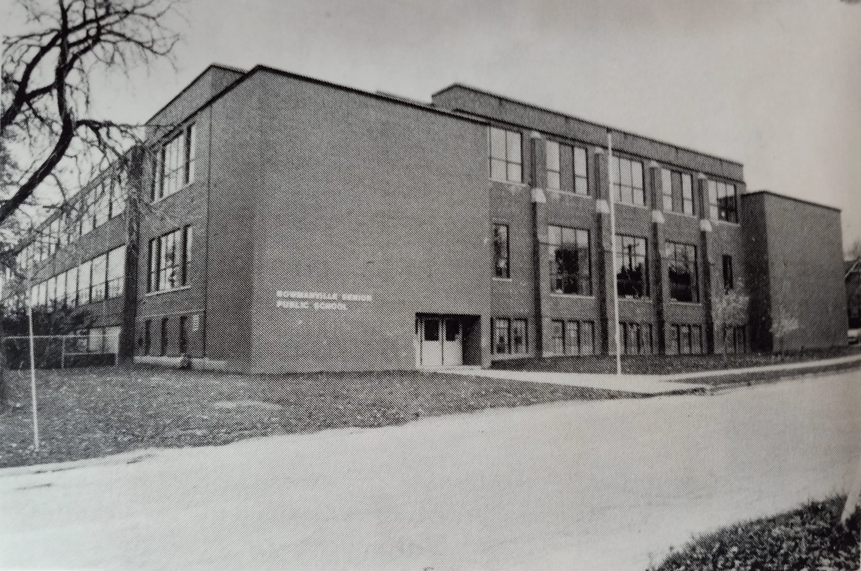
Photo of Bowmanville Senior Public School, 1979

=== Bowmanville Senior Public School ===
The former High school building was renovated between 1974 (the fire happened during this renovation) and re-opened as BSPS on November 25th as an intermediate school for students in Grades 7 and 8. It was open for 32 years until its closure in June 2007 due to declining enrollment. In the years after the closure, the school was left boarded-up and abandoned. The building became notorious for vandalism, break-ins and arson, with four fires in 2014 alone. Demolition of the school occurred in 2015. Chartwell Bowmanville Creek Retirement Residence was built and opened in 2016 on the property, and the design pays tribute to the original exterior of 1890 BHS.

Until the opening of Duke of Cambridge Public School, BSPS moved to a hallway upstairs in BHS for 6 years between September 2007 - June 2013.

=== Bowmanville High School Centennial Celebration ===
1990 marked 100 years of the establishment of Bowmanville High School. A large reunion was held on June 22 - 24 of that year, with over 3 years of planning to make that magic happen. The first day included the reunion and reception with people touring the decade rooms set up on the first floor in rooms 141, 143 and 146. The next day was a tour of Bowmanville Senior Public School, the old BHS, and the new BHS. Later that day was the Favorite Musicals Revue, arranged by retired drama director Bob Sheridan. That evening had 3 period dances for '50s graduates and before, '60s graduates and '70s to '90 graduates at the Bowmanville Recreation Complex (later Garnet B. Rickard Recreation Complex), and the Bowmanville Lions Community Centre (later Clarington Beech Centre). The last day was a pancake breakfast held in the cafeteria in the morning.

== Academics ==
BHS offers Advanced Placement (AP) and pre-AP courses in Math and English. Students can begin their enrichment program in Grade 9 to receive a more challenging program and, in Grade 12, AP students will have the opportunity to write AP exams.

== Feeder schools ==
The following elementary schools feed directly into Bowmanville High School.

- Central Public School
- Charles Bowman Public School
- Duke of Cambridge Public School (French Immersion)
- Harold Longworth Public School
- John M. James Public School
- Vincent Massey Public School

== See also ==
- Education in Ontario
- List of secondary schools in Ontario
