= Adam Scott Collegiate and Vocational Institute =

High school and middle school in Ontario, Canada

Location
- 175 Langton Street; Peterborough, Ontario, K9H 6K3; Canada; 34°59′20″N 106°36′52″W

Information
- School type: Public, high school and middle school
- Motto: Seek the Truth
- Founded: 1960
- School board: Kawartha Pine Ridge District School Board
- Superintendent: Anne Marie Duncan
- Area trustee: Docité Schandry
- School number: 890464 (Secondary); 002194 (Intermediate/Elementary)
- Administrator: Darlene Little; Tracy Hall
- Principal: Laura Doucette
- Vice Principals: Jeff Saint Thomas, Nicole Bardell
- Grades: 7–12
- Enrollment: Approximately 1200 (September 2019)
- Language: English; French immersion
- Colours: Green, White, and Yellow
- Mascot: Cole Hoskisson "Leo" the Lion
- Team name: Lions
- Website: www.adamscott.ca

Adam Scott Collegiate and Vocational Institute and Intermediate School is a high school and middle school in Peterborough, Ontario, Canada, and was named for Adam Scott, Peterborough's first settler. It was established in 1960. As of 2009, 222 students were enrolled in its Intermediate School (grades seven and eight) and 796 students in the secondary school (grades nine to twelve). The school has an auto shop as well as a basic chemistry lab. It also has a newly renovated library and a courtyard. Among its notable alumni are musicians from the band Three Days Grace, professional ice hockey players Cory Stillman and Mike Fisher, celebrity chef Keith Hamilton-Smith, and politician Dean Del Mastro.

Adam Scott CVI is part of the Kawartha Pine Ridge District School Board and celebrated its 50th anniversary in the Fall of 2010.

Adam Scott CVI is named after Adam Scott, Peterborough, Ontario's first settler.

== Athletics ==
Some of the sports Adam Scott Collegiate & Vocational Institute participates in include:

- Badminton
- Baseball
- Basketball
- Cross country
- Field hockey
- Football
- Golf
- Ice hockey
- Lacrosse
- Rowing
- Rugby
- Soccer
- Track and field
- Ultimate frisbee
- Volleyball

== Notable alumni ==
- Dean Del Mastro - Politician
- Mike Fisher - Ice hockey player
- Adam Gontier - Musician
- Greg Knox - Canadian football player
- Brendan Mertens - Film director
- Barbara Mervin - Canadian rugby player
- Neil Sanderson - Musician
- Cory Stillman - Ice hockey player
- Jared Wayne - NFL football player

== See also ==
- Education in Ontario
- List of secondary schools in Ontario
