= Clarington Central Secondary School =

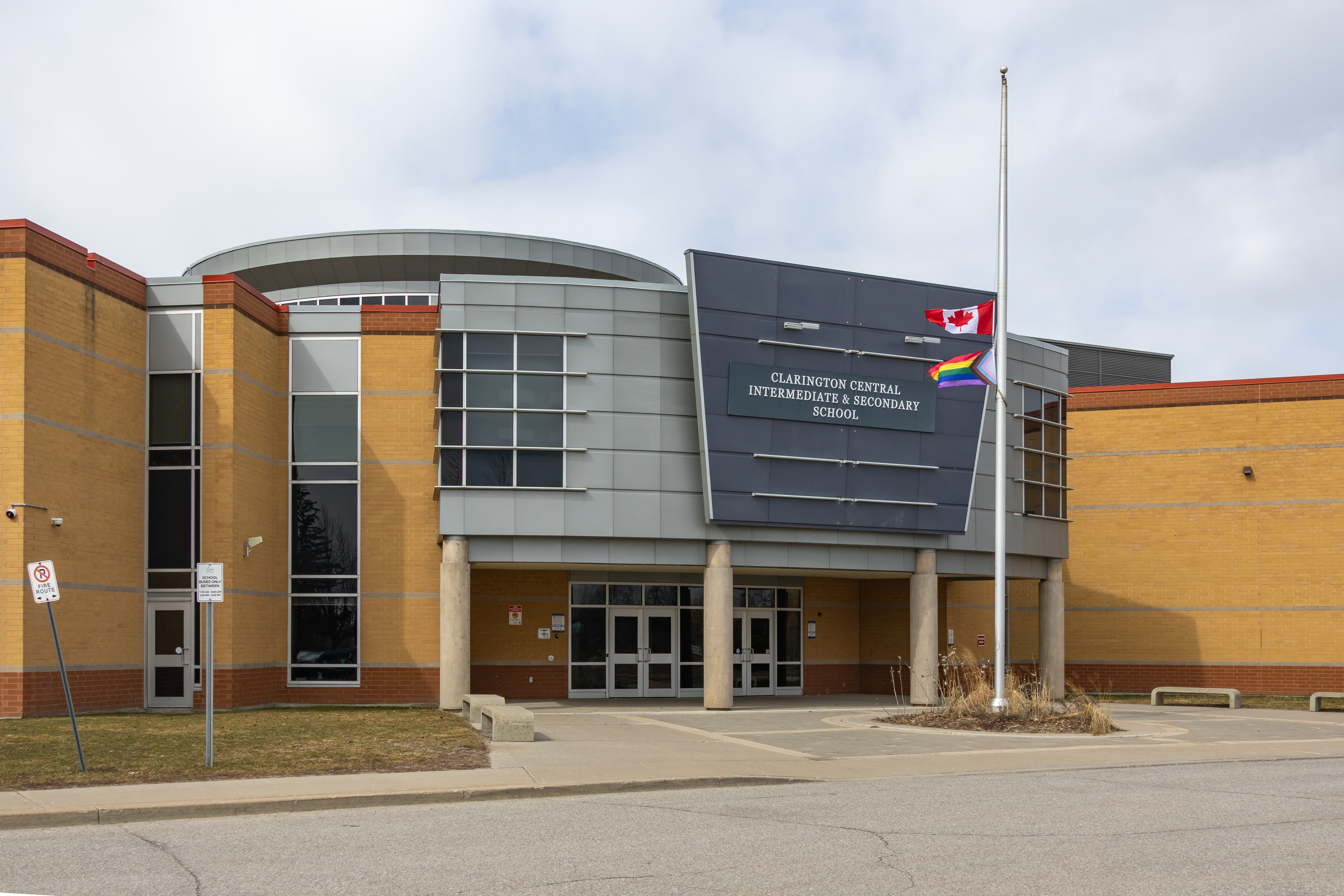
- Clarington Central in 2025

Location
- 200 Clarington Boulevard; Clarington, Ontario, L1C 5N8; Canada; 43.91289°N 78.70986°W

Information
- School type: Public High School
- Founded: 2005
- School board: Kawartha Pine Ridge District School Board
- Superintendent: Gloria Tompkins
- Area trustee: Cathy Abraham; Sarah Bobka
- Principal: Jennifer Knox
- Grades: 7-12
- Enrollment: 855 (2021–2022)
- Language: English
- Area: Clarington
- Colours: Blue, Grey, Silver
- Mascot: Cody the Coyote
- Team name: Clarington Coyotes
- Website: claringtoncentral.kprdsb.ca

Clarington Central Secondary School is a public secondary school located in Bowmanville, Ontario, Canada, within the Kawartha Pine Ridge District School Board. The school includes Grades 7–12, with the lower grades constituting Clarington Central Intermediate school.

== History ==
Clarington Central Secondary School opened to students in September 2005, the first new secondary school opened by the Kawartha Pine Ridge District School Board for 33 years. The first principal was Ron Tansley, who was succeeded in 2009 by Wilf Gray. As of 2025 the principal is Jennifer Knox.

== Academics ==
The school was built with a television in every classroom and video broadcasting facilities. In 2010, based on their class video, the school's 12th-grade French immersion class was the only public school among five finalists in an Ontario provincial contest organised by the University of Ottawa.

== Notable alumni ==
- Eric Osborne, actor

== See also ==
- Education in Ontario
- List of secondary schools in Ontario
