= Campbellford District High School =

Location
- 119 Ranney Street North; Campbellford, Ontario, K0L 1L0; Canada; 44°18′42″N 77°47′34″W

Information
- School type: Public, high school
- Motto: Per vias rectas (Latin "By right ways")
- School board: Kawartha Pine Ridge District School Board
- Superintendent: Shelly Roy
- Area trustee: Michelle Jones; Amy Hagerman (First Nation)
- School number: 898260
- Administrator: Jackie Mahoney
- Principal: Scott Johnson
- Grades: 9 to 12
- Enrollment: 709 (September 2009)
- Language: English French
- Colours: Red, Black and Gold
- Mascot: Felix the Phoenix
- Team name: Flames
- Website: Official website

Campbellford District High School is a high school in the community of Campbellford in the municipality of Trent Hills, Northumberland County, Ontario, Canada. It is part of the Kawartha Pine Ridge District School Board. As of September 2009 it had 709 students. In the Fraser Institute's Report Card on Ontario's Secondary Schools 2011, the school was ranked 432 out of 727 secondary schools in Ontario with an overall rating of 5.8 out of 10.

== See also ==
- Education in Ontario
- List of secondary schools in Ontario
