= Sugar Island 37A =

- Indian reserve
- Sugar Island Indian Reserve No. 37A
- Location within Southern Ontario
- Coordinates: 44°13′N 78°08′W
- Country: Canada
- Province: Ontario
- County: Peterborough
- First Nation: Alderville

Area
  - Land: 0.41 km^{2} (0.16 sq mi)
- Website: www.alderville firstnation.ca

Sugar Island 37A is an island and First Nations reserve within Rice Lake in southern Ontario. It is one of two reserves of the Alderville First Nation, along with Alderville.
