= Castleton, Ontario =

- Compact rural community
- County Road 25 in Castleton

- Location within Ontario Location within Canada
- Coordinates: 44°05′36″N 77°56′19″W
- Country: Canada
- Province: Ontario
- County: Northumberland
- Township: Cramahe
- Time zone: UTC-5 (Eastern (EST))
  - Summer (DST): UTC-4 (EDT)
- GNBC Code: FAPHQ

Castleton is a compact rural community in Cramahe Township, Northumberland County, Ontario, Canada.

== History ==
The first settler was Joseph Abbott Keeler, who erected a mill on Piper's Creek around 1806. Known as "Purdy’s Mill", it was built with stones imported from Paris, France.

The settlement which grew near the mill was first called "Piper's Corners", and then "Centreville". To avoid confusion with nearby Centreton, the settlement was renamed "Castleton" after both Castleton, England, and Castleton, Vermont, where some of Joseph Keeler's family had originally settled.

Castleton Town Hall opened in 1830, and a wood framed school opened around 1840.

Castleton became the seat of Cramahe Township in 1859, and by 1865, the settlement had a carriage and wagon shop, a barrel maker, a harness shop, two sawmills, two shoe shops, two tailors, two hotels, three general stores, and three churches.

The population was approximately 400 in 1870, 400 in 1880, and 500 in 1908.

In 1870, Castleton School House was built, and held all grades until 1922.

The Union Hotel opened in the 1890s, catering primarily to travelling salesmen.

A mass murder occurred in 1963 which became known as the Castleton massacre. Robert Killins, a former United Church minister, murdered his estranged pregnant wife, his pregnant daughter, a six-year-old girl, and his sister Ada Gladys Killins (and her dog).

Castleton, circa 1920

== Notable people ==
- Iva Campbell Fallis - Canada’s first Conservative female Senator.
- William Arthur Steel - Canadian Army officer during World War I and radio pioneer.
