= Cobourg Collegiate Institute =

Location
- 335 King Street East, Cobourg, Ontario; Canada; 43.9621°N 78.1528°W

Information
- Opened: 2015
- School district: Kawartha Pine Ridge District School Board
- Principal: T, Burke
- Grades: 9-12
- Enrollment: 1,200
- Colors: Red and blue
- Mascot: Wolfie the Wolf
- Team name: The Wolves
- Website: cci.kprdsb.ca

Cobourg Collegiate Institute (CCI) is a high school in the town of Cobourg, Ontario, Canada.

Grammar schools were given permission by the Canadian government to form Cobourg High School in 1871. In 1872, the title of Cobourg Collegiate Institute (CCI) was granted. In 1901 the cornerstone for CCI was laid at 135 King Street West, establishing the school on its own site. The number of students continued to grow, which required sharing nearby buildings, purchasing an extra building and then building additions on the initial site. With the post WWII population boom, the number of students continued to increase. In 1961 a second high school in Cobourg was built, resulting in the splitting of original CCI into Cobourg District Collegiate West (CDCI West) at the original site, and Cobourg District Collegiate Institute East at the new site at 335 King Street East. The number of students eventually declined in the late 20th century. By 2015 the buildings at CDCI West were sold to a private school and the two public high schools were amalgamated back into CCI at the 335 King Street East site [2] [3]
