= Letitia Youmans =

Canadian school teacher and activist for the temperance movement

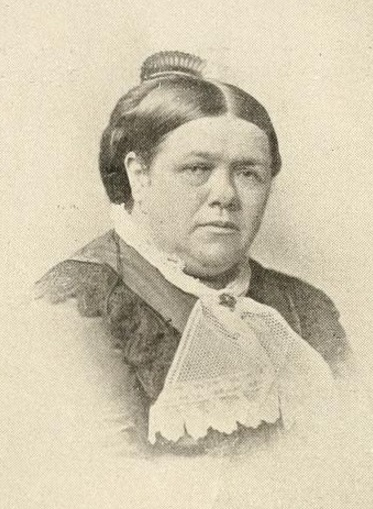
- Born: Letitia Creighton; 3 January 1827; Baltimore, Upper Canada
- Died: July 16, 1896 (aged 69); Toronto, Ontario, Canada
- Occupations: teacher, activist, editor

Letitia Youmans (3 January 1827 – 16 July 1896) was a Canadian school teacher who became an activist for the temperance movement. Youmans founded and served as the first president of the Ontario chapter of the Women's Christian Temperance Union. She also served as editorial writer for the IOGT's Temperance Union.

== Early life ==
Letitia Creighton was born in 1827 in Baltimore, Upper Canada, near Cobourg. Later in life, she became well known in the Canadian temperance movement. At ten years of age she had an experience which started her on her temperance vocation. Her teacher introduced his students to the dangers of alcohol. He invited them to sign a temperance pledge. In her autobiography, Letitia Youmans describes the moment:

"I spent three months (1837) with this teacher, during which time an incident occurred which had much to do with shaping my future destiny. One day at the noon recess, after disposing of our lunch, the teacher called us up to his desk. He proceeded to speak of the evils of drunkenness, which had become very apparent in our neighborhood, telling us that unless we were very careful, some of us might become victims of this fearful evil. He closed by informing us that he had discovered a safeguard against the danger, and then proceeded to read a temperance pledge which he had drawn up and signed himself. " Now," said he, " I would like as many as are willing to give me their names." At first, the appeal seemed to be only to the boys, for up to that time I had never seen or heard of such a thing as a drunken woman. I resolved to be on the safe side, however, and consequently put down my name.

"I am happy to say that pledge has never been violated since. This, no doubt, was the beginning of temperance work in the schools of Canada, and if not scientific, it was, at least, eminently practical. Our teacher took the pledge with him to the homes, and in this way obtained many signatures. Would that every common-school teacher from that day to the present had pursued a similar course. I believe Canada would now be free from the curse of the liquor traffic. Someone has said : "The star of hope for the temperance reform is over the schoolhouse."

"The late lamented Mr. Crooks, Minister of Education for Ontario, instituted the movement of scientific instruction on the effects of alcohol in the schools, in response to a petition from the WCTU. This movement has spread through the different provinces of the Dominion, and we hope to see a law on the statute books of each province, requiring every teacher to teach temperance in the schools, with as much interest as he does any other branch of instruction."

== Methodism and education in the mid-1800s ==
The Methodist Church in Upper Canada experienced intense internal development and divisions. The United States-based Methodist Episcopal Church, began work in 1791 among British immigrants to Upper Canada. By 1828 the Methodist Episcopal work in Canada had formally severed ties with the US denomination. In 1833, most of it joined with the British Wesleyans to form the Wesleyan Methodist Church in Canada. Those not forming this union re-organized into the Methodist Episcopal Church of Canada (1834)." These developments in turn affected the organization of Methodist schools such as those located in the Cobourg area.

=== Cobourg schools ===
In 1837, Cobourg's Upper Canada Academy, a Wesleyan Methodist school, was incorporated by Royal Charter. Youmans looked forward to attending the school but when the Academy developed into Victoria College, it became an all-male school. This disappointed her intensely.

"This seemed to me cruelty in the extreme, and no ray of light appeared to penetrate the gloom. Many a night my pillow was wet with my tears over the thought of the Egyptian darkness which surrounded me, but as is often remarked, the darkest hour is just before the break of day. A new ladies' school had just been opened by Professor Van Norman."

When Victoria College became an all-male institution, two proprietary schools with links to Methodism were established for the education of females in the Cobourg area; the Hurlburt's Cobourg Ladies' Academy and the Van Norman's Cobourg Ladies' Seminary. Youmans was educated at the Cobourg Ladies' Seminary.

While at this school, she decided to consecrate her life to Christ. This spiritual decision provides context to Youmans other activities; i.e. teacher, temperance leader, and community activist. Even though the school was officially denominational, it promoted a non-sectarian community. If a student was a member of a particular denomination, that denomination was invited to take an active part in the religious services. Youmans describes when she made her decision to be a Christian.

"Our principal was a devoted Christian, and impressed upon his pupils the necessity of consecration to God. While he assisted us in ascending the hill of science, he seemed still more anxious to lead us to Calvary. And while not ignoring the laurel wreath, he pointed out, with greater earnestness, the superior beauty of the Rose of Sharon and the Lily of the Valley. "Friday evening was set apart for religious services, in which members of all churches represented in the school took a part. The unconverted were always made welcome; but it was quite optional whether they took any part or not. On one of these occasions, our principal gave an earnest appeal for immediate consecration to Christ, asking those who would enlist in His service to make it known by rising. As I now remember it, every one not hitherto decided, arose at once. I hesitated a moment, when a friend at my side affectionately pressed my hand, saying now is your time. I then arose and from that moment I felt that I was committed to the service of God, and in a little prayer-meeting a few evenings afterwards, with a few of my schoolmates, who, like myself, were seeking to realize the pardoning love of God, we were enabled to venture upon the sin-atoning sacrifice, and claim Jesus as our Saviour, and take Him as our guide."

Two leading educators played a role in Youmans education: Daniel Cummings Van Norman and Egerton Ryerson.

Youmans describes a Christmas Eve when everyone associated with the Cobourg schools met at Victoria College and mingled with the Who's Who of the area.

"One of the most pleasing events of this winter was a reception given at Victoria College on Christmas eve. Dr. and Mrs. Ryerson, Mr. Webster, the moral governor, and lady were to preside. Our school received an invitation. It was a state occasion, and to those of us who hailed from the country, it was a fiery ordeal to be marched in single file and presented to our hosts and hostesses. The warm, fatherly grasp of Dr. Ryerson's hand, and the welcome extended to us, dispelled every fear… The pupils of our rival school, under the superintendence of Prof. Hurlbut and lady, were also guests on that occasion." Others present were the families of political leaders, churchmen, and educational leaders.

=== Burlington Ladies' Academy ===
While helping his wife with the Cobourg Ladies' Seminary, Professor Van Norman served on the Victoria College faculty. He resigned his position and moved their Ladies' school to Hamilton and renamed it the Burlington Ladies' Academy. When Youmans completed her course at the Cobourg Ladies' Seminary, she continued her education at the Burlington school. Van Norman made this financially possible on the condition that she pay for her tuition by staying on as a teacher after her graduation.

The Hamilton school opened October, 1845. According to its 1847 Catalogue, the Academy offered two courses of study which they called the "Useful" and the "Ornamental." The Useful course included these subjects: "Spelling, Reading, Writing, Geography, English Grammar, Arithmetic, Ancient and Modern History, beginning with the history of the Bible, Botany, Physiology, Natural Philosophy, Chemistry, Geology, Philosophy of Natural History, Astronomy, Rhetoric, Kames' Elements of Criticism, Select parts of the English Classics, Intellectual Philosophy, Moral Philosophy, and Paley's Evidences of Christianity, with exercises in Composition throughout the entire course."

The Ornamental course included: "The French Language, Instrumental and Vocal Music, Perspective, Drawing and Painting, Wax Flowers, Embroidery, and the Principles of Etiquette and Female Manners."

Youmans took only the "Useful" course. She wrote, "There was a second course called the 'ornamental,' for which I had not time to spare, neither did my inclination run particularly in that direction." She lists the subjects she took. Her list varies from the school catalogue's. She includes meteorology and geometry and French in her list of Useful subjects.

== Marriage to Arthur Youmans ==
In 1850, at the age of 23, she married Arthur Youmans. Her marriage brought with it heavy responsibilities. Three years earlier, Arthur's previous wife died, leaving him a widower with eight children. The older children were almost the same age as their new step-mother.

In her autobiography, Mrs. Youmans discusses her decision to marry and offers advice to young women contemplating such a marriage as hers. She also describes her husband,

"I do not hesitate to present the man to whom I then pledged my heart and hand as an embodiment of the characteristics which would ensure happiness in the marriage relation. The son of a devoted Christian mother, he in boyhood became a decided Christian, and by the same maternal influence he was pointed out the evils of intemperance, and pledged to total abstinence. These principles were strictly adhered to through life. He was a British subject, loyal to his country, well persuaded in his political views, and yet no blind adherent to partyism; benevolent almost beyond his means to every good cause. Although not holding a college diploma, his mind was well stored with useful knowledge, and his house abundantly supplied with the best reading matter of the day. He never was an aspirant for public offices, his home being ever the dearest spot on earth to him. I refer to these traits of character, not at all by way of eulogy to one who has years since gone home to Heaven, and whose memory is still engraven on my heart."

Arthur Youmans had strong temperance principles. Even before his marriage to Letitia Creighton, he had prepared unfermented wine for his church. As a farmer he never sold a bushel of grain to be manufactured into alcohol. He refused to grow hops and barley or grind malt for the local distillery. He sold lumber, but would not sell to anyone who planned to use the lumber to make beer barrels. If he needed supplies, he made sure that the freight boat did not have a bar aboard. He only bought groceries from alcohol-free retailers.

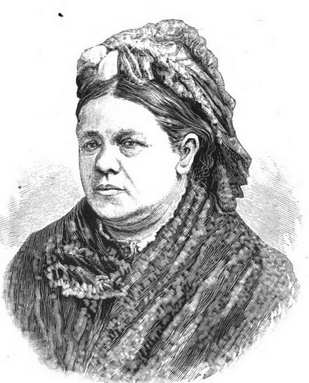
Letitia Youmans

Mrs. Youmans had many requests to travel from those wanting her help in the temperance movement. Before agreeing to go to these various places, she "submitted" the matter to her husband. He was supportive and told her to "Go, by all means, if you can do any good." The only time he objected to such travel was if he felt she needed a rest.

In looking back over her years of marriage to Arthur Youmans, she wrote, "I thank God for thirty-two years of companionship with one so good and true."

== Transportation on Lake Ontario ==
In the mid-19th century, long-distance public transportation in Upper Canada took place along Lake Ontario by means of small steamboats following daily schedules. Besides the smaller conveyances, there were mail boats and first-class steamers. Most boats offered deck passage fare or, with additional cost, cabins and meals. These boats stopped at Cobourg and Port Hope on their way to Toronto and Hamilton. The distance from Kingston to Toronto was about 180 miles. It took eighteen hours.

When Youmans accepted a position at Rev. Daniel McMullen's Picton Ladies' Academy, she travelled there by steamer October, 1849, during what she called "that inclement season." She stated that even sea-sickness on the Atlantic did not match "the awful sensation of the waves of Lake Ontario." "It was joy supreme to once more find myself safe on terra firma."

In May 1875, the members of the Picton WCTU learned that representatives of the Right Grand Lodge of Good Templars was about to visit Napanee, the next town east of Picton. They decided to go as a group to meet them. This posed a problem. The boat for Napanee that day carried a bar, and they had voted not to give business to any company that sold alcohol. There was a small alcohol free steamer commanded by Captain Port but that day it was bound for Belleville. They chartered his boat to take them to Napanee, some twelve miles off his route, and then on his returning he would stop and take them home. They met with the Good Templars there in Napanee. At the close of the meeting they went on board their ‘temperance steamer’ and headed for home. The small cabin was crowded; it was now eleven p.m. The trip would take three hours. They sang several gospel hymns. Someone suggested that they have a testimony meeting. Anyone who had ever been "injured by the liquor traffic" was invited to share his or her experience. One after another spoke of what they had experienced.

== The Picton Sabbath School and early temperance concerns ==
The Sunday School movement began in England with the innovations of Robert Raikes in the 1780s. The Canadian Sunday School movement began in the 1820s. Many people, including Youmans, referred to Sunday as the Sabbath. Some called school activities taking place at church on Sunday, Sabbath School. These early Sunday Schools ran much like schools operating during the week. Today's Sunday Schools often merely provide an hour-long church program usually based on Bible stories.

The Youmans moved to Picton once their children were grown and on their own. Mrs. Youmans agreed to take on the Sabbath School class for the youth of the Methodist church where she and her husband attended. Through creative innovations, attendance in the class grew to almost one hundred students of varying age. As part of her work with the youth, Mrs. Youmans visited them in their homes. These visits enlightened her to the problems of drunkenness in these young people's families. As she considered the terrible circumstances of her young associates, she felt that inaction "was criminal." She introduced a total abstinence pledge into her Sabbath School class. Next, at a temperance meeting, she noticed how attentive some of the young boys were as they sat on the front row. She decided to organize a youth temperance society.

== Time line ==
- 1827, Born January 3, near Cobourg, Ontario
- 1847, graduated from Burlington Ladies' Academy.
- 1850, Preceptress for the Picton Ladies' Academy. Marries Arthur Youmans.
- 1864, Dunkin Act established.
- 1874, Attended the Chautauqua Assembly where she met leaders of the American women's temperance crusade.
- 1874, The Woman's Christian Temperance Union (WCTU) in Canada originated in Owen Sound, Ont. under the leadership of Mrs. R. J. Doyle.
- 1874, The second chapter formed in Picton, Ontario with the help of Mrs. Youmans.
- 1878, The Canada Temperance Act, also known as the Scott Act, established.
- 1880?, January, Visited with President and First Lady Hayes. The Hayes White House was alcohol-free.
- 1882, Arthur Youmans died.
- 1885, A Canada-wide WCTU was organized in 1885, with Youmans as president.
- 1886, March, Travels to California then to British Columbia. From there she travels eastward across the Canadian frontier concluding her journey on the steamer, Athabasca, from Port Arthur to Owen Sound.
- 1888, August, Inflammatory rheumatism caused her to lose the use of her limbs. After this, she was confined to her bed.
- 1893, Wrote her autobiography, "Campaign Echoes".
- 1896, Died July 18 at Toronto.
