= Alderville, Ontario =

Alderville
- Indian reserve
- Alderville First Nation Indian Reserve
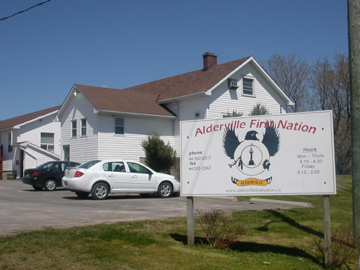

- Location within Southern Ontario
- Coordinates: 44°11′N 78°04′W
- Country: Canada
- Province: Ontario
- County: Northumberland
- First Nation: Alderville

Government
  - Chief: Taynar Simpson

Area
  - Land: 12.59 km^{2} (4.86 sq mi)

Population (2016)
  - Total: 495
  - Density: 39.3/km^{2} (102/sq mi)
- Time zone: UTC-5 (EST)
  - Summer (DST): UTC-4 (EDT)
- Website: www.aldervillefirstnation.ca

Alderville is one of two reserves of the Alderville First Nation, along with Sugar Island 37A. Alderville consists of six non-contiguous areas surrounded by the township of Alnwick/Haldimand. It was previously known as Alderville 37.
