= Baltimore, Ontario =

Baltimore
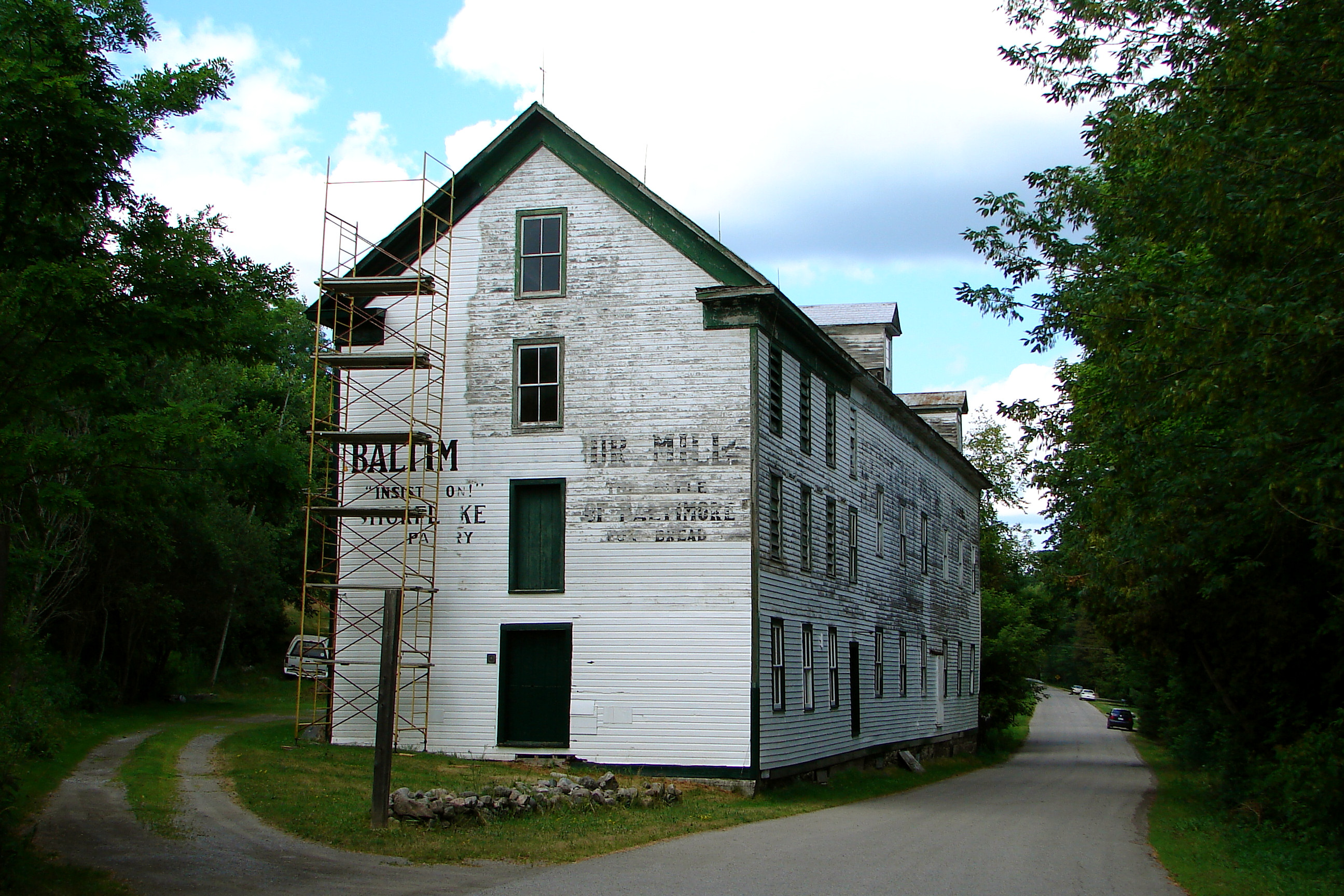
- Ball's mill

- Location in Southern Ontario Location in Ontario Location in Canada
- Coordinates: 44°1′20″N 78°8′54″W
- Country: Canada
- Province: Ontario
- County: Northumberland
- Township: Hamilton
- Time zone: UTC-5 (Eastern Time)
  - Summer (DST): UTC-4 (Eastern Daylight Time)

Baltimore is a village located in the southeast portion of Hamilton Township in Northumberland County in central Ontario. It is just north of the town of Cobourg, located at the intersection of County Road 45 (formerly Highway 45) and County Road 74 (Dale Road).

It is best known today for the presence of historic Ball's Mill, built in 1842, and as the birthplace of Letitia Youmans (1827).

== History ==
Baltimore was one of the first settlements in the Township of Hamilton. It was founded by Irish immigrant John McCarty in 1805, and was named after his family's ancestral home in Baltimore, County Cork, Ireland. Baltimore was further developed in the 1840s by Austin B. Carpenter, the first reeve of Hamilton Township. The village developed around agricultural activity and hosted a variety of mills and small industries that served the surrounding community.

== Community ==
The Baltimore Recreation Centre is located in Baltimore and contains an arena and indoor turf facility. The surrounding Baltimore Recreation Park includes four baseball diamonds, a multi-purpose court, a pickleball court, two volleyball courts, a playground, a paved walking path, and a picnic shelter.

Baltimore Public School, managed by the Kawartha Pine Ridge District School Board, is the community's only public school and serves students from kindergarten to Grade 6.

Fire protection is provided by the Township of Hamilton Fire Department, which operates three fire stations throughout the township. The department's main station is located in Baltimore and serves majority of southern Hamilton Township.

Two protected natural areas are located within Baltimore. Bonebakker Nature Reserve lies at the eastern end of the Oak Ridges Moraine and contains drumlins, pasture, hayfields, hardwood and cedar forests, and a headwater stream. More than 60% of the nature reserve consists of cattle pasture, which also provides habitat for a variety of wildlife. The nature reserve is managed by Northumberland Land Trust.

Ball's Mill Conservation Area is used for passive recreation and contains a pond and dam associated with the historic Ball's Mill. The northern portion of the conservation area includes the Baltimore Creek Provincially Significant Wetland. The conservation area is managed by Ganaraska Region Conservation Authority.

== Gallery ==
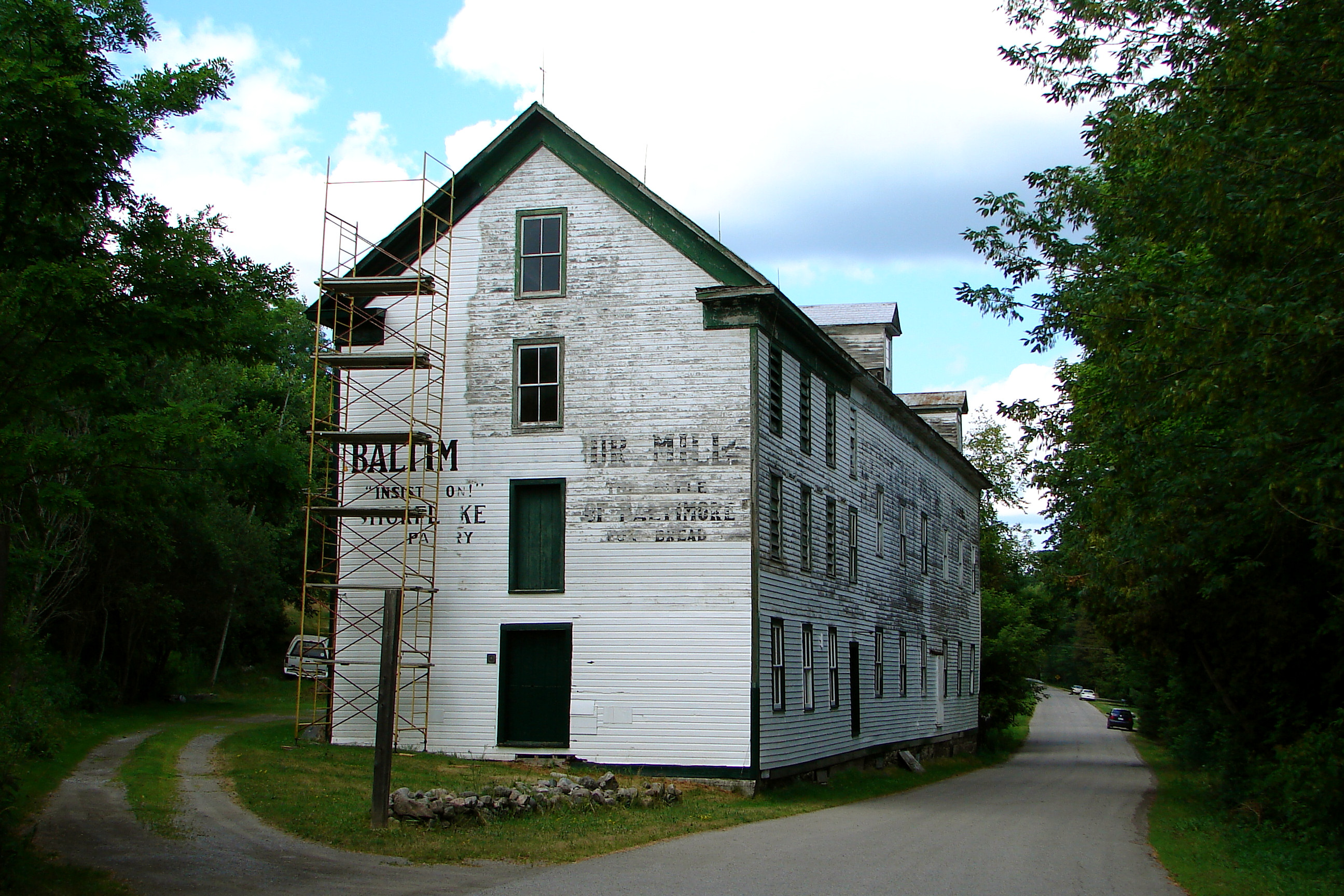
Ball's Mill on McDougall Street

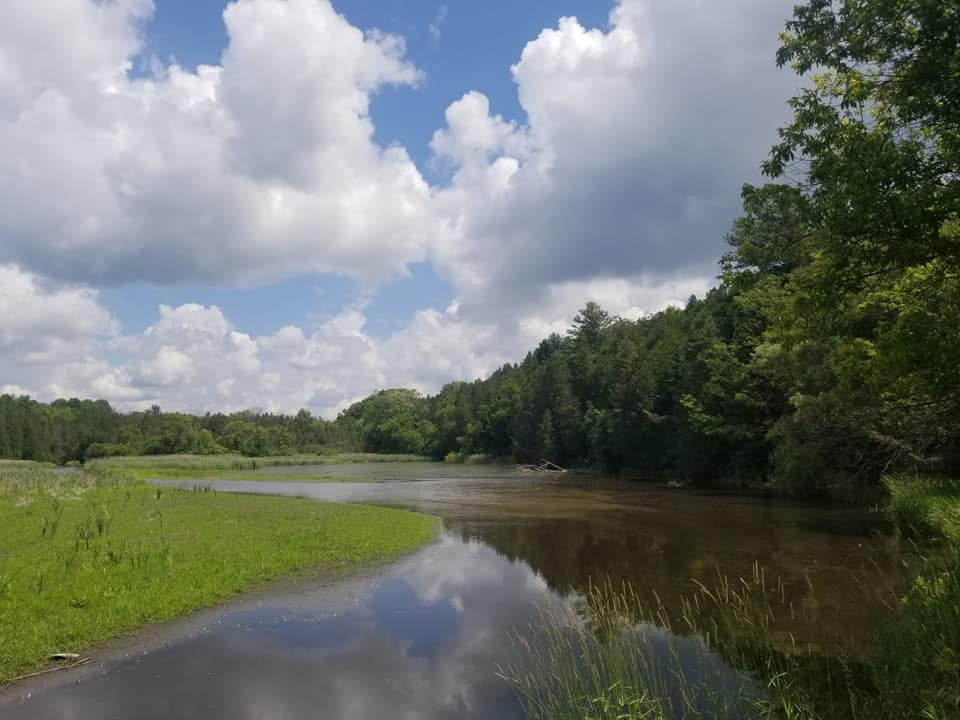
Ball's Mill Conservation Area

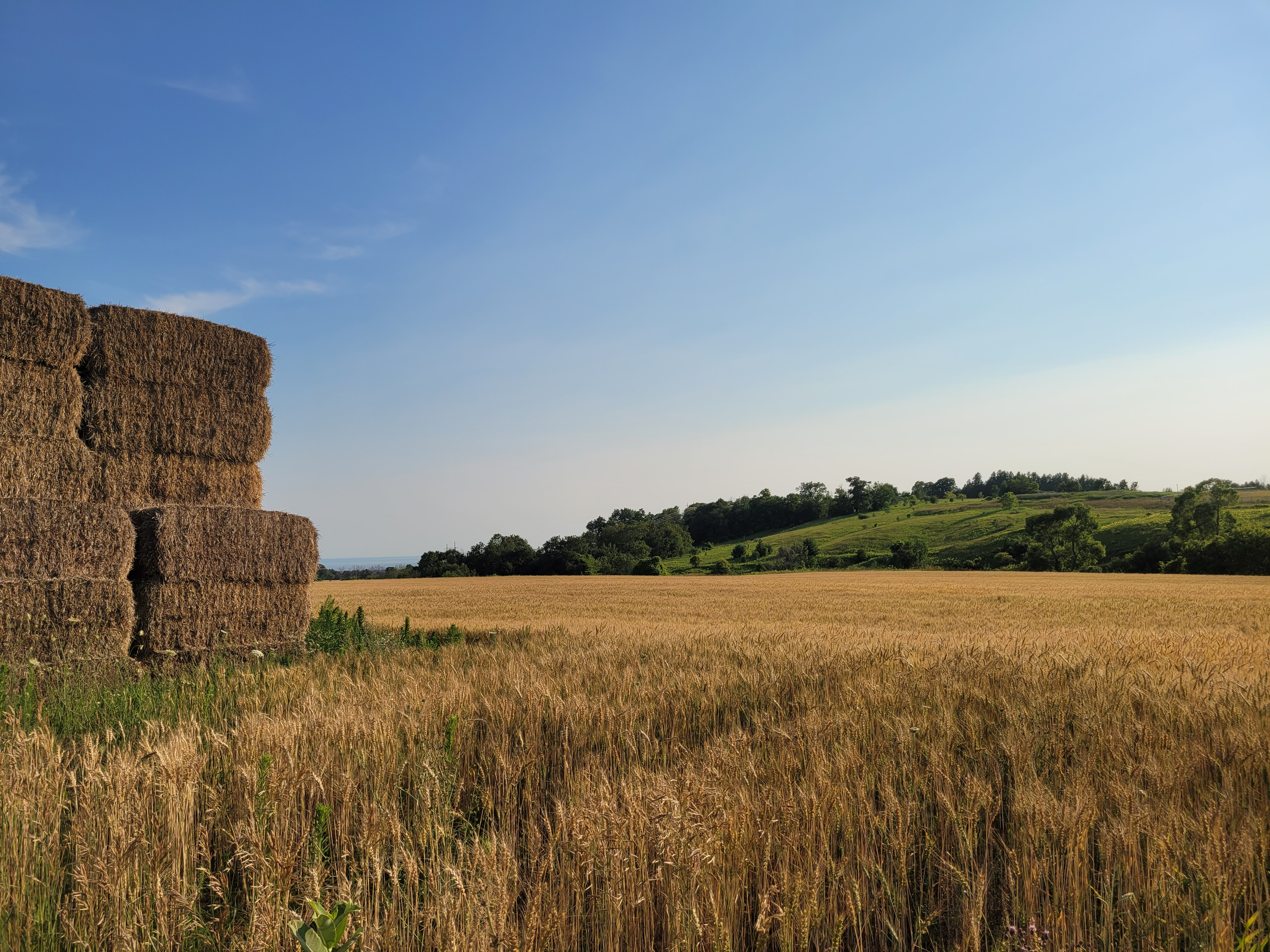
Field scenery in Baltimore.
