= Centreton, Ontario =

Centreton
- Unincorporated community
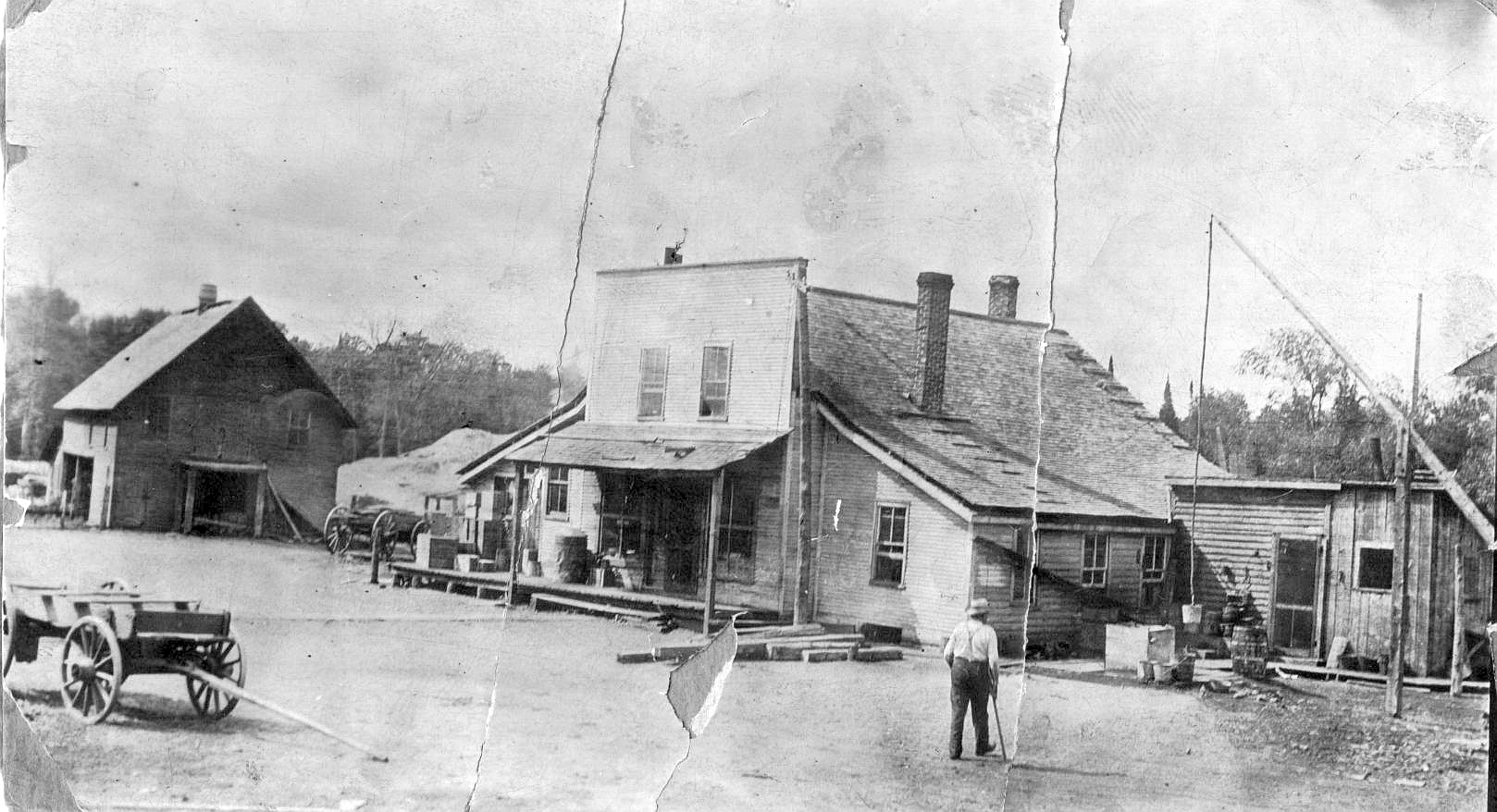

- Location in Ontario
- Coordinates: 44°05′00″N 78°02′30″W
- Country: Canada
- Province: Ontario
- Regional municipality: Northumberland County

Population
  - Total: 130

Centreton is an unincorporated community in the Canadian province of Ontario. It is located in the township of Alnwick/Haldimand, in Northumberland County. Centreton has a population of about 130 people, with little fluctuation during the past 100 years. During the 19th century, the population was about 250, and during that time two saw mills were operated in the village, processing the trees in the area. When the mills closed, the population declined. At one point, the community contained two churches, two sawmills, a one-room school house and a general store.

At the present, only one of the churches is left, the other having burnt down long ago, and is used as the community hall, Centreton Public Library, and voting location during elections. The school house is now a private residence, and although the mills have gone there is still some logging in the Northumberland Forest north of the community. The Centreton General Store was located in the same site where the original burned down in the early 20th century. The store has since closed, and is now converted to a private residence.

Centreton has always been a farming community, and there are still many farms operating in the area. In the past, the large majority of farms in the area grew tobacco, but after the market declined in the mid-1980s, the local farms switched to other crops and produce. There is a large hydroponics greenhouse growing tomatoes just west of the village as well as many farms growing corn, soybeans and grains. Located north of Centerton there are hiking trails such as Peters Woods Provincial Nature Reserve.

== Culture ==
The Centreton Community Centre is a public building that holds 95 people and there is an associated public library

== See also ==
- List of communities in Ontario
