= Alnwick/Haldimand =

Township in Ontario, Canada

- Township (lower-tier)
- Township of Alnwick/Haldimand
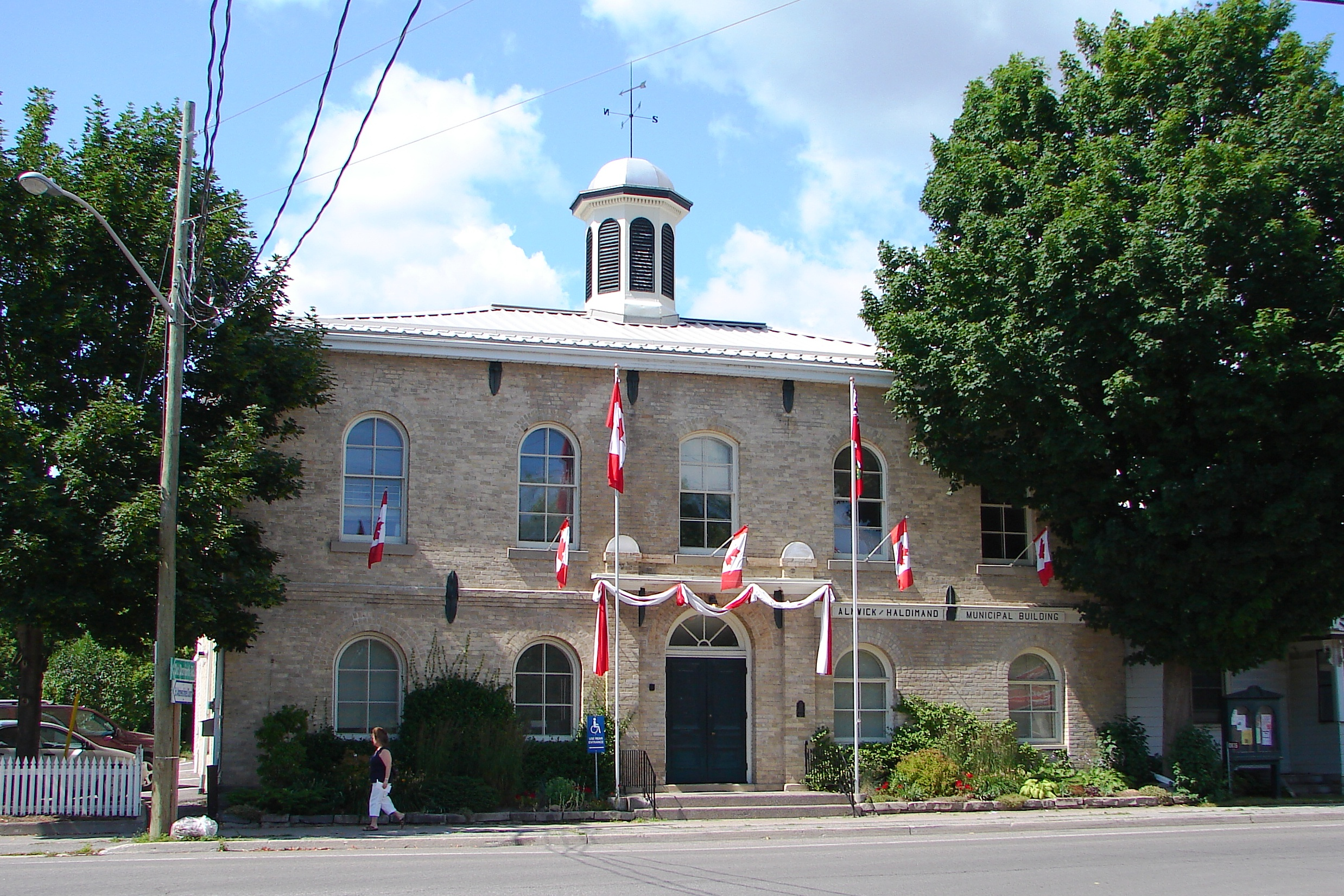
- Township hall in Grafton
- Nickname: The Township between the Lakes
- Location within Northumberland County Location within Southern Ontario
- Coordinates: 44°05′N 78°02′W
- Country: Canada
- Province: Ontario
- County: Northumberland
- Incorporated: 2000

Government
  - Type: Township
  - Mayor: John Logel
  - Federal riding: Northumberland—Clarke
  - Prov. riding: Northumberland—Peterborough South

Area
  - Land: 398.25 km^{2} (153.77 sq mi)

Population (2021)
  - Total: 7,473
  - Density: 18.8/km^{2} (49/sq mi)
- Time zone: UTC-5 (EST)
  - Summer (DST): UTC-4 (EDT)
- Postal Code: K0K
- Area codes: 905, 289, 365, and 705
- Website: www.alnwickhaldimand.ca

Alnwick/Haldimand is a township in Central Ontario, Canada, in Northumberland County, situated between Lake Ontario and Rice Lake. It was formed in 2001 by the merger of Alnwick Township in the north and Haldimand Township in the south. Alderville First Nation is an autonomously governed First Nation contained within the township boundaries, in two non-contiguous sections along County Roads 45 and 18.

== History ==
=== Alnwick Township ===
Alnwick Township was originally surveyed in 1795 when twenty-four lots were laid out on the first concession. It was named for Alnwick in Northumberland, England. The first crown grants were issued in 1798 and other surveys would follow in subsequent years. The township's first residents were made up of United Empire Loyalists, attracted by large unencumbered land grants, sometimes in the thousands of acres. In 1835, 3,600 acres of land along the first and second concessions were set aside as an Indian settlement. Shortly after, the Indian Band from Grape Island was moved into this settlement and a school and church were built at Alderville. The first council meeting was held in 1845 at Alderville School. The Alnwick/Haldimand Township building located in Grafton was built in 1858. Prior to its construction, Township Council meetings were held at local taverns or the residences of council members.

=== Haldimand Township ===
Haldimand Township was formed in 1791 and was named in honour of Sir Frederick Haldimand – a British general who served as Governor-in-Chief of Canada between 1778 and 1796. By 1804, there were 356 settlers in Haldimand Township making it the second most populous township in the region after Hamilton Township to the West. The town hall was constructed in 1860. However, in order to be as accessible to as many rate payers as possible, council held frequent meetings in public buildings in towns across the Township. On one occasion following a fire that destroyed the Centreton Community Centre in 1943, a council meeting was held at the private residence of former reeve Stanley McBride.

=== Municipal restructuring ===
As part of provincial initiatives in the late 1990s, the Government of Ontario pursued a policy of municipal amalgamations to rationalize municipal levels of government services and "reduc[e] government entanglement and bureaucracy with an eye to eliminating waste and duplication as well as unfair downloading by the province". On June 9, 1999, an order from the Ontario Minister of Municipal Affairs for the amalgamation of Alnwick Township and Haldimand Township into a single Township of Alnwick/Haldimand received Royal assent. The amalgamation came into effect on January 1, 2001.

== Geography ==
=== Geographical features ===
Alnwick/Haldimand is part of the Oak Ridges Moraine: a significant land form in Ontario.

31.3 km^{2} of the Cobourg Creek watershed runs through the Township. The majority of this area is located within the Oak Ridges Moraine. The Creek supports a diverse ecosystem including forests, meadows and wetlands. Numerous species inhabit the Creek including brown trout, rainbow trout, scuplins and darters. Migratory Chinook Salmon spawn in the creek and Atlantic Salmon are being stocked as part of a provincial initiative to return these native fish to Lake Ontario.

The Ganaraska Forest is an 11,000-acre forest located in the Township. It is one of the largest blocks of forested land in southern Ontario. The Millvalley Hills Forest is a 297 hectare forest located within the Township of Alnwick/Haldimand. The dominant trees species are red and white pine, and red and white oak, however red oak dominates the area.

The Harwood Road Wetland is a class 2 provincially significant wetland located in the Township of Hamilton and the Township of Alnwick/Haldimand. 95.9 hectares in size, the wetland is 95% swamp, and 0.5% marsh.

=== Communities ===
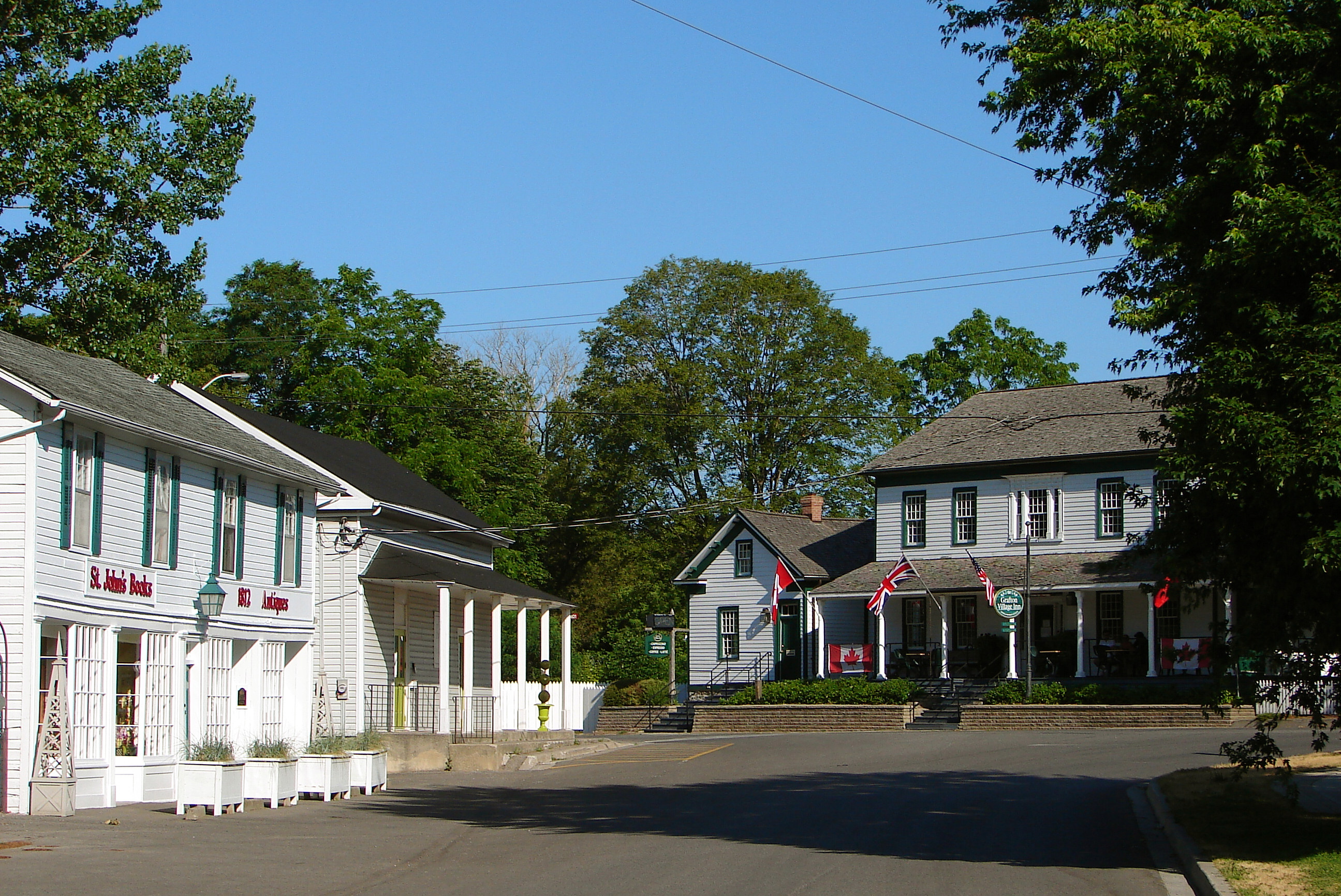
Grafton

The township comprises the communities of Burnley, Carmel, Centreton, Dunnette Landing, Fenella, Grafton, The Gully, Lakeport, Little Germany, McCracken Landing, Oak Heights, Robins Landing, Roseneath, Vernonville and Wicklow.

==== Alderville First Nation ====
The Alderville First Nation is an Anishinaabe First Nation located in southern Ontario, Canada. As of September 2008, Alderville First Nation had 1007 registered band members, of which their on-Reserve population was only 313 people, meaning the majority of their registered population live outside the reserve (off-reserve) in neighbouring communities.

The First Nation have reserved for themselves two areas. Their main reserve, the Alderville First Nation (formerly designated as Alderville Indian Reserve 37 by Indian and Northern Affairs Canada), is located near the south shores of Rice Lake in Ontario (44°11′N 78°04′W). It consists of six non-contiguous areas within the Alnwick/Haldimand Township approximately 30 kilometres (19 mi) north of Cobourg, and occupies a total area of 1,199.8 hectares (2,965 acres). They also maintain a smaller parcel of land on nearby Sugar Island, the 40.5 hectares (100 acres) Sugar Island 37A Indian Reserve (44°13′N 78°8.25′W). It has been home to the Mississauga division of the Anishinaabe (Ojibwa) Nation since the mid-1830s.

== Demographics ==
In the 2021 Census of Population conducted by Statistics Canada, Alnwick/Haldimand had a population of 7,473 living in 2,823 of its 3,323 total private dwellings, a change of 8.8% from its 2016 population of 6,869. With a land area of 398.25 km^{2} (153.77 sq mi), it had a population density of 18.8/km^{2} (48.6/sq mi) in 2021.

As of the 2011 Census of Canada, Alnwick/Haldimand had a median age of 46.6 years.

Canada census – Alnwick/Haldimand community profile

	2021	2016	2011
Population	7,473 (+8.8% from 2016)	6,869 (+3.8% from 2011)	6,617 (+2.8% from 2006)
Land area	398.25 km^{2} (153.77 sq mi)	398.45 km^{2} (153.84 sq mi)	398.57 km^{2} (153.89 sq mi)
Population density	18.8/km^{2} (49/sq mi)	17.2/km^{2} (45/sq mi)	16.6/km^{2} (43/sq mi)
Median age	49.6 (M: 49.2, F: 49.6)	48.6 (M: 48.4, F: 48.6)	46.6 (M: 46.9, F: 46.2)
Private dwellings	3,323 (total) 2,823 (occupied)	3,064 (total)	3,052 (total) 2,471 (occupied)
Median household income	$102,000	$85,837	$78,090

References: 2021 2016 2011

According to the 2011 National Household Survey, 13.1% of the population was foreign-born and 86.6% were Canadian born. The most common countries of birth of immigrants living in Alnwick/Haldimand are the United Kingdom (62% of the immigrant population) and the Netherlands (6.4%). In the 2021 census, percentage of foreign-born population had dropped to 9.9%, with the most common country of origin still being the United Kingdom (33% of the immigrant population).

Historical census populations – Alnwick/Haldimand
Year	Pop.	±%
1996	5,528	—
2001	5,846	+5.8%
2006	6,435	+10.1%
2011	6,617	+2.8%
2016	6,869	+3.8%
2021	7,473	+8.8%
Source: Statistics Canada

Historical census populations – Alnwick Township

Year	Pop.	±%
1871	1,369	—
1881	1,471	+7.5%
1891	1,321	−10.2%
1901	1,247	−5.6%
1911	802	−35.7%
1921	696	−13.2%

Year	Pop.	±%
1931	755	+8.5%
1941	701	−7.2%
1951	641	−8.6%
1956	640	−0.2%
1961	611	−4.5%
1966	676	+10.6%

Year	Pop.	±%
1971	713	+5.5%
1976	786	+10.2%
1981	760	−3.3%
1986	886	+16.6%
1991	1,072	+21.0%
1996	1,078	+0.6%

Source: Statistics Canada

Historical census populations – Haldimand Township

Year	Pop.	±%
1871	5,796	—
1881	5,401	−6.8%
1891	4,484	−17.0%
1901	3,946	−12.0%
1911	3,465	−12.2%
1921	3,008	−13.2%

Year	Pop.	±%
1931	2,859	−5.0%
1941	2,621	−8.3%
1951	2,486	−5.2%
1956	2,683	+7.9%
1961	2,803	+4.5%
1966	2,925	+4.4%

Year	Pop.	±%
1971	3,083	+5.4%
1976	3,373	+9.4%
1981	3,433	+1.8%
1986	3,490	+1.7%
1991	4,172	+19.5%
1996	4,450	+6.7%

Source: Statistics Canada

=== Religion ===
According to the 2011 National Household Survey, 72.7% of the population in Alnwick/Haldimand reported a religious affiliation while 27.4% said they had no religious affiliation. The most common religion was the United Church (22.3%), followed by Anglicanism, (22.2%) and Roman Catholicism (13.5%).

=== Languages spoken ===
Mother tongue (2021):

- English as first language: 92.6%
- French as first language: 1.3%
- English and French as first language: 0.3%
- Other as first language: 5.2%

== Economy ==
The township is rural based with agriculture being the largest contributor to the general economy. Grain, cash crops, milk, livestock, vineyards and apple farming are all viable in the area. The top industries for the employed labour force are manufacturing, public administration and construction. Approximately 15% of workers were self-employed as of the 2011 Census of Canada.

Tourism is also a contributor to the local economy. Venues such as Golden Beach Resort and Ste. Anne's Country Inn & Spa are among the top private sector employers in Northumberland County. Outdoor activities including hiking, kayaking, snowmobiling, fishing, birding and camping also contribute to the tourism industry.

== Government ==
=== Local government ===
Alnwick/Haldimand has a Township Council of 5 members including a Mayor, Deputy Mayor, and three ward councillors. Normally, they are elected for four-year terms, along with all other municipalities in Ontario. The next election is scheduled to take place in 2022. On the current council, Greg Booth was selected to replace Raymond Benns, who died in March, 2019.

In addition to the Township Council, members sit on a number of local committees.

Township Council 2018 - 2022
Position	Name	Portfolio	Committee Appointments (as of June 2019)
Mayor	John Logel	Protective Services	Public Liaison Communal Water Committee Grafton; Grafton Community Centre; Community Control Group (Emergency Plan); Roseneath Revitalization; Police Services Board
Deputy Mayor	Gail Latchford	Public Works and Infrastructure	Police Services Board; Fenella Community Centre Committee; Northumberland Hills Hospital Physician Recruitment Committee; Public Works Committee
Councillor Ward 1	Greg Booth	Rural and Environment	Public Liaison Communal Water Committee Grafton; Centreton Community Centre Committee; Ganaraska Region Conservation Authority; Lower Trent Conservation Authority; Nawautin Sanctuary Committee; Safe Communities Committee; Agricultural Advisory Committee
Councillor	Michael Filip	Culture and Heritage	Heritage Cemetery Committee; Alnwick/Haldimand Public Library Board; Heritage Alnwick/Haldimand; Vernonville Hall Committee; Alnwich/Haldimand Community Policing Committee
Councillor	Sherry Gibson	Recreation, Tourism, Economic Development	Joint Animal Control Municipal Service Board; Alnwick Civic Centre Board of Management; Northumberland & Central Chamber of Commerce; Parks and Recreation Committee; Accessibility Committee; Economic Development Committee

=== County government ===
Alnwick/Haldimand is part of Northumberland County. County Council is composed of the mayors of each of the seven towns, townships and local municipalities within its boundaries. The head of County Council is called the Warden as is elected annually from amongst its membership.

Alnwick/Haldimand Mayor John Logel serves as the representative on the County Council.

=== Provincial representation ===
Alnwick/Haldimand is in the provincial electoral district of Northumberland—Peterborough South, represented by David Piccini of the Progressive Conservative Party of Ontario.

=== Federal representation ===
As of the 2015 Federal Election, Alnwick/Haldimand is in the federal electoral district of Northumberland—Peterborough South. This riding was created by the 2012 federal electoral boundaries redistribution and came into effect upon the calling of the 42nd Canadian federal election. The riding has been represented by Philip Lawrence of the Conservative Party of Canada since 2019.

== See also ==
- List of municipalities in Ontario
- List of townships in Ontario
