= Alderville First Nation =

Band of indigenous people in Canada

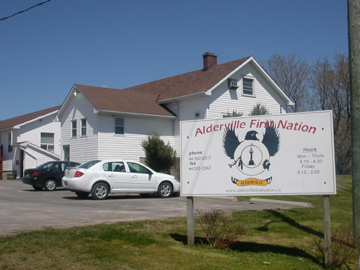
Alderville First Nation Band Office

Alderville First Nation is a band of Mississaugas, a sub-nation of the Ojibways. The Alderville and Sugar Island 37A reserves belong to that First Nation band government.

== First Nation ==
The Alderville First Nation is an Anishinaabe First Nation located in southern Ontario, Canada. As of December 2017, Alderville First Nation had 1,162 registered band members, of which their on-Reserve population was only 323 people, meaning the majority of their registered population live outside the reserve (off-reserve) in neighbouring communities.

=== Governance ===
The community is governed by an elected Chief and Council and maintains political affiliations with the Ogemawahj Tribal Council, a non-political Regional Chiefs' Council, and the Anishinabek Nation political organization.

== Indigenous reserve ==
The reserve comprises two areas. The main reserve, the Alderville First Nation (formerly designated as Alderville Indian Reserve 37 by Indian and Northern Affairs Canada), is located near the south shores of Rice Lake in Ontario (44°11′N 78°04′W). It consists of six non-contiguous areas within the Alnwick/Haldimand Township approximately 30 kilometres (19 mi) north of Cobourg, and occupies a total area of 1,199.8 hectares (2,965 acres). They also maintain a smaller parcel of land on nearby Sugar Island, the 40.5 hectares (100 acres) Sugar Island 37A Indian Reserve (44°13′N 78°8.25′W). It has been home to the Mississauga division of the Anishinaabe (Ojibwa) Nation since the mid-1830s.

== History ==
For centuries until the early 19th century, the ancestors of the people who would found Alderville First Nation had lived in their traditional lands around the Bay of Quinte - located approximately 90 kilometres (56 mi) east of the Nation's current location.

With the influx of refugee settlements following the American Revolution, the community found itself under increased pressure. Having lost its American colonies, the British relocated the soldiers and civilians loyal to the crown (also known as the United Empire Loyalists) around the Bay of Quinte area. A swath of land between Belleville and Brockville was purchased from the Mississaugas in the 1783 Crawford Purchase, and the land around the Bay of Quinte was given specifically to the Mohawks under the leadership of Chief John Deserontyon, who had been dispossessed of their traditional territory in modern-day New York State. This group of Mohawks came to be the Mohawks of the Bay of Quinte First Nation on what is now known as the Tyendinaga Mohawk Territory.

The Mississaugas of the area lived alongside the Mohawks and other Haudenosaunee for the first few decades after the latter's canoes made landfall. In the 1820s, many people in the community converted to Methodism, and in the case of the two or three hundred Mississaugas who converted, this led them to settle on the small Grape Island, located off Gravelly Point in Prince Edward County.

== Cannabis industry ==
Alderville Reserve is home to "The Green Mile", a concentration of cannabis dispensaries that are sometimes described as a grey market, neither subject to nor operating by provincial dispensary laws.

== Albert Smoke ==
Albert Smoke (1894–1944) was a long-distance runner who competed at the 1920 Summer Olympics and placed third at the 1922 Boston Marathon.
