= Peterborough Collegiate =

Secondary school in Ontario, Canada

Peterborough Collegiate and Vocational School

Location
- 201 McDonnel Street; Peterborough, Ontario, K9H 2W1; Canada; 44.30928°N 78.32233°W

Information
- School type: Public High School
- Founded: 1827; 199 years ago
- School board: Kawartha Pine Ridge District School Board
- Superintendent: Peter Mangold
- Area trustee: Rose Kitney, Roy Wilfong, Wes Marsden
- School number: 935182
- Principal: Jim Rielly
- Grades: 9 to 12
- Language: English
- Area: COSSA
- Colours: Garnet and Grey
- Mascot: Ralph The Raider
- Team name: Raiders
- Website: pace.kprdsb.ca

PACE at Peterborough Collegiate, formerly Peterborough Collegiate Vocational School, is a public secondary school located in Peterborough, Ontario, Canada and is a member of the Kawartha Pine Ridge District School Board. It is one of the oldest public schools in the country and was the only public high school in the city of Peterborough until the opening of Kenner Collegiate Vocational Institute in 1952. Regular student programming ended at Peterborough Collegiate Vocational School in June 2012. The building was renamed Peterborough Collegiate and in August 2012 opened as a re-purposed facility offering alternative and continuing education (ACE).

Peterborough Collegiate was founded in 1827 as the Peterborough Government School on the former property of Central Public School. Since then it has been moved to different locations throughout the central part of the city with various names and types of programming. It reached its peak enrollment in 1959 with 1402 students and used additional buildings to accommodate the students of the baby boom. At the turn of the twenty-first century, the trend of declining enrollment had reduced the school student population to 800 students with approximately one third in the Integrated Arts and English Language Learners programs.

== History ==
Peterborough Collegiate and Vocational School (PCVS) is one of the oldest schools in Ontario.

=== Peterborough Government School ===
Reverend Samuel Armour opened the first school in Peterborough on May 1, 1826. The school, originally known as the Peterborough Government School was first located in the back playground of present-day Central Public School on Murray Street in Peterborough. It functioned as a public elementary school and the early Victorian equivalent to a public high school. As the population of Peterborough increased, public school students moved into smaller schools while the Grammar School high school students stayed in the original school building.

=== The Union School ===
By 1854 the school trustees had leased an old church, on the corner of Hunter and Sheridan Streets, to hold the school but the student population soon grew too large. In 1855 plans to build a new school had begun. The new building was completed in 1859 and was intended to be used by both common and grammar school students. It was located where the present day Central School is built. The new school was known as the Union School. By 1868 the principal of the school asked that girls be allowed to attend grammar school. A new building was constructed west of the Union School to allow for the increased student population.

=== Peterborough Collegiate Institute ===
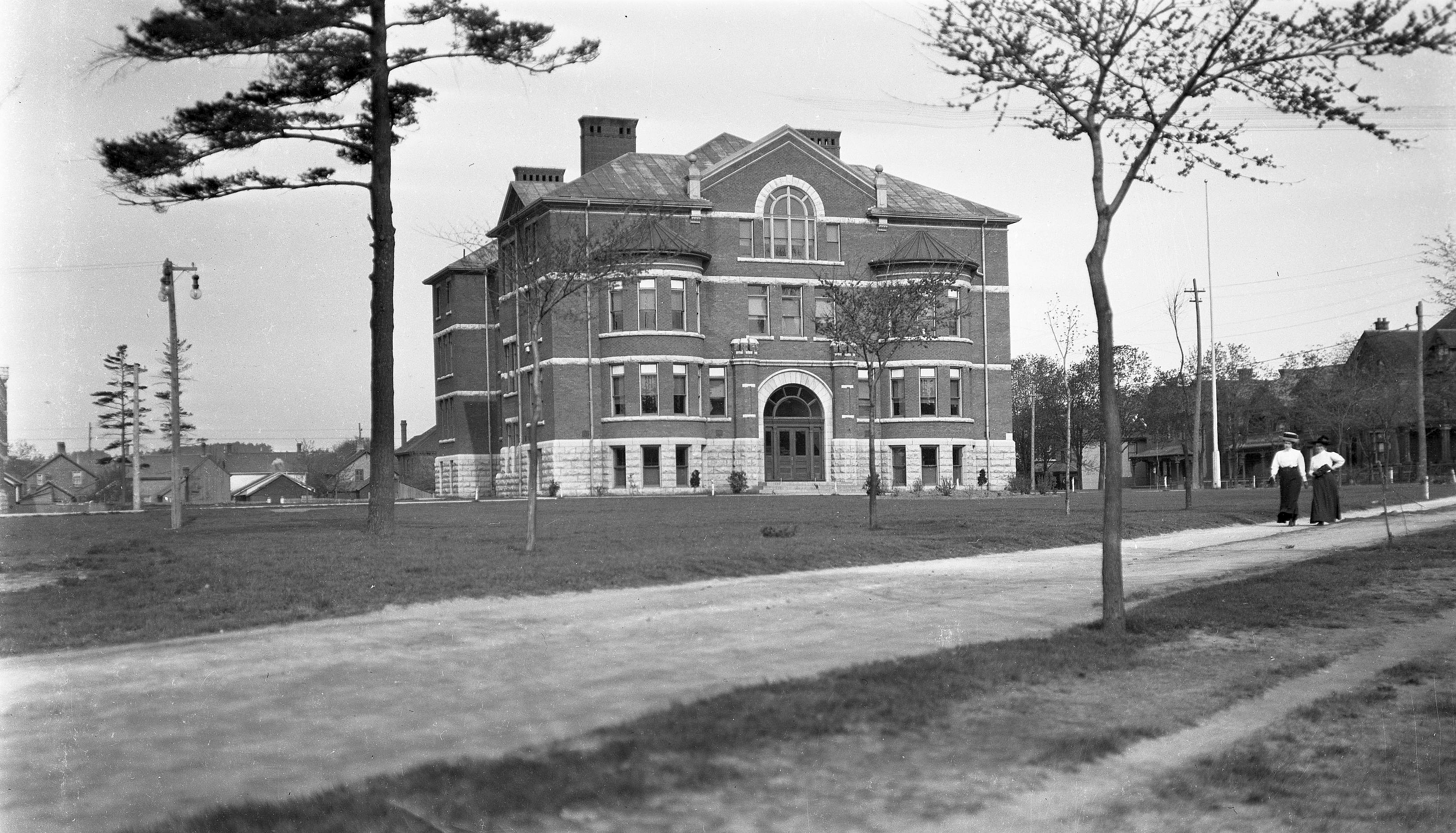
Peterborough Collegiate Institute at McDonnel Street Location, 1911

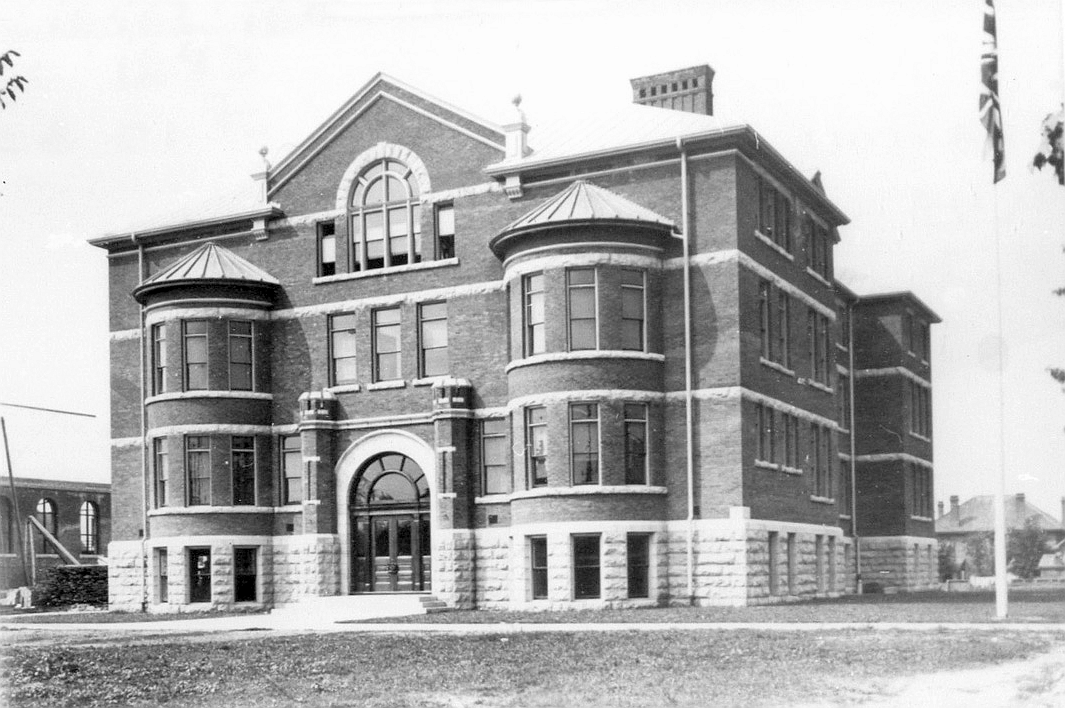
McDonnel Street Location, circa 1917

In 1871, with a government bill abolishing the term grammar school and replacing it with collegiate, the Union School became the Peterborough Collegiate Institute (PCI). Due to overcrowding and various moves within the buildings it soon came time for the Collegiate to have its own building, separate from the public school. On August 1, 1907, the cornerstone for the new school was laid. The new school opened in 1908 on the corner of Aylmer and McDonnel Streets near the Armouries.

==== House System ====
PCI implemented the four house system to encourage school spirit and foster a positive school environment. The four houses were Keswick, Caernarvon, Warwick and Wiggin, each represented by a colour: Blue, Yellow, Red, and Green respectively. Each house had one male and one female house leader, who represented their membership on the Student Activity Council. They organized events such as dress-up days, bulletin board displays, and lunch events where participants could earn house points. At the annual Christmas (Winter) Assembly, the houses performed a skit for a competition judged by a selection of faculty members, preceding the Teacher Skit. The House Award honoured the house with the most points at the end of the school year. The house system continued until the school was re-purposed in 2012.

=== Peterborough Collegiate Vocational School ===
In 1927 a vocational school was added to the PCI and became Peterborough Collegiate and Vocational Institute (PCVS). This new section included the Upper Gym, Cafeteria and Library. At the turn of the century, the school enrolled about 800 students with 200 as part of the Integrated Arts program. A tradition of extracurricular athletics included basketball, volleyball, rowing, field hockey, tennis, badminton and track teams. The PCVS Ladies Choir was ranked in the Top Ten choirs in Canada. In 1995, PCVS was listed by Maclean's magazine as one of the top five high schools in Canada in the category of Student Leadership. PCVS was also the first school in Peterborough to establish a gay–straight alliance, which was featured provincially in Professionally Speaking magazine. In 2008 the school celebrated the 100th anniversary of the school building on May 17 by hosting a Gala/Reunion with entertainment talent featuring PCVS alumni including Sean Cullen, Lawrence Cherney, Rick Fines and Graham Rowat among others.

Principals of PCVS 1909 - 2012
Name	Years of Service
H.R.H. Kenner	1909 - 1943
Carl S. Browne	1943 - 1955
R. David Brown	1955 - 1967
Kenneth P. Hoaasack	1967 - 1969
A.L. Reilly	1969 - 1971
L. James Watson	1971 - 1981
H. Bert Moss	1981 - 1982
Robert J. Allan	1982 - 1987
John McCormack	1987 - 1993
Shirl Delarue	1993 - 2001
Rick Essex	2002 - 2004
Caroline McNamara	2005
Anita Simpson	2005 - 2007
Denise Severin	2007 - 2012

==== Principal's portraits ====
There was a tradition at PCVS that the principals would have their photographs taken at the end of their tenure. The photographs were framed and mounted above the balcony doors of the auditorium on the foyer's second floor to maintain the leadership's history of the school. The first portrait features H.R.H. Kenner and the last portrait, mounted in 2012, features Denise Severin, the last principal of PCVS. Caroline McNamara, appointed interim principal after the sudden death of Rick Essex, was not included in this tradition.

==== Student Council Art Purchases ====
Beginning in the 1940s, the Student Councils of Peterborough Collegiate and Vocational School, with the encouragement of their art teacher Zoltan Temesy, bought original Canadian art works for the enjoyment of students at their school. These works are currently on permanent loan to The Art Gallery of Peterborough. Artists include: Andre Bieler, A.J. Casson, Lawren Harris, Arthur Lismer, Manley MacDonald and Henri Masson. Reproductions of these paintings now hang throughout the school.

==== English Language Learners Program ====
The English as a Second Language (ESL) program started in the 1980s. These students were new immigrants to Canada who settled in Peterborough, International Students, whose parents or national governments paid tuition for their children to learn English in Canadian schools, and exchange students from International community groups, such as Rotary International.

The program catered to four levels of English proficiency, with additional support for student success on the Ontario Secondary School Literacy Test conducted by the Education Quality and Accountability Office. Community supports for students and families were also made available for study visas, residency applications, and cultural integration.

In 2009, the program was renamed as the English Languages Learners (ELL) program, as part of a Ministry of Education directive, to acknowledge that many students who were in the program speak multiple languages of which English is only one. The ELL program was moved in September 2012 to Thomas A. Stewart Secondary School.

==== Integrated Arts Program ====
In 1990, the Integrated Arts program was established, offering students from Peterborough County the opportunity to take specialized programs in drama, music, visual art, and dance. Prospective grade 8 students submitted a portfolio, auditioned and were interviewed for spots in the program. The Grade 9 program offered general and comprehensive art courses with a common English and Physical Education with an Arts focused curriculum. The entire Grade 9 Integrated Arts population presented two showcase productions each year in January and May.

In Grade 11, a three-credit Musical Theatre class is offered for Drama, Vocal, and Theatre Production credits with selection based on auditions. In the past, The Wiz, Grease, The Sound of Music, among many other plays, have been performed for the Elementary students, current students, and the wider community. In Grade 12, a similar three-credit drama course is offered for English, Drama, and Drama in the Community credits. This class traveled around the city performing a thematic series of skits to Elementary schools and local community groups.

In 2012, the PCVS Integrated Arts Programme was renamed the Peterborough Regional Integrated Arts Programme and was moved to Thomas A. Stewart Secondary School.

==== Spread the Net Student Challenge ====
In December 2011, PCVS students and faculty established the PCVS Saves Lives campaign to enter the Spread the Net Student Challenge. Fundraising efforts in the school and local community group donations raised $52,631.32 exceeding the school goal of $8,000. In March 2012, it was announced that PCVS won the challenge in the high school team division and raised 20% of all the money collected in the 2012 Student Challenge. Rick Mercer visited the school with his crew and taped footage for a seven-minute feature on the Rick Mercer Report. On April 4, 2012, PCVS was nationally recognized as the winner and was the inspiration for his Rant in the same episode.

==== School Closure Debate ====
In 1970 the Peterborough County Board of Education proposed converting PCVS to intermediate school with strong reactions led an opposition slate in school board elections. The following year, a new plan retained PCVS as high school.

In 1983 it was announced that PCVS and three other schools would be studied for possible closure, sparking widespread opposition and the formation of the Save PCVS Parents’ and Ratepayers’ Association. In 1984, the school board votes to keep PCVS open.

In 1987 the school board considered leasing PCVS to the local Catholic school board. The Save PCVS association successfully campaigned and instead of leasing PCVS, public board gives Catholic board unused land to be sold so Catholic board can use the money to build a new school.

In 2010 the Kawartha Pine Ridge District School Board named PCVS as one of four high schools being examined in an Accommodation Review Process (ARC), triggered by declining student enrollment. On September 29, 2011, the school board voted to consolidate the student population into three other Peterborough high schools and re-purpose the school for alternative programming. Peterborough Needs PCVS, chaired by formal Principal Shirl Delarue, launched a judicial review of the ARC process after the Ministry of Education accepted the Independent Facilitator Report, which found no major errors were made in the board's review. Throughout this period student and community opposition to the decision was organized through social media, which was publicly displayed with delegations inside and protests outside board meetings, student walk-outs and sit-ins, demonstrations, and civil disobedience, a protest at Queen's Park (Toronto), and a lawn sign campaign. A unanimous decision by the Ontario Superior Court of Justice Divisional Court dismissed the court challenge in its entirety on 18 June 2012 with a written decision released 9 October 2012. Regular student programing ended at PCVS in June 2012.

=== Peterborough Collegiate ===
In August 2012, PCVS was renamed Peterborough Collegiate and became the new location for the Peterborough Alternative and Continuing Education (PACE). The re-purposed facility houses the Literacy and Basic Skills (LBS) program, Prior Learning Assessment and Recognition (PLAR), Independent Learning Program (including correspondence and e-Learning), Dual Credit Program, the School for Young Moms (SYM), and the registration office for International Languages Continuing Education courses.

== Alternative and Continuing Education Programming ==
The LBS program is an employment skills program to help students prepare for employment, earn their Ontario Secondary School Diploma, or apprenticeship. Students 19 years or older must possess literacy and numeracy skills to meet everyday needs and find and maintain employment. In addition, there is a focus on computer skill development and preparation for General Educational Development.

Students over 18, who have been off of a day-school register for 10 consecutive months, are PLAR eligible. The program requires students to have at least 30 credits (based on current OSSD requirements), pass a Literacy Test or Ontario Literacy Course, and complete 40 hours of community service to graduate. There is a Junior PLAR based on four assessments in English, math, science, geography/history where students can earn a maximum of 16 credits authorized by the Principal. A Senior PLAR is available for a maximum of 10 additional credits, based on an application of prior learning that has occurred outside of the classroom setting.

Dual credits began in Ontario in 2005 and give selected secondary school students the opportunity to experience a college environment. Students take a college credit taught by a college faculty member and must meet the requirements to pass. If successful, students earn an elective credit at secondary school and are issued a college credit on a college transcript. The course will be recognized at college if they choose to attend a program for which the course is a requirement. Dual credits are available in a variety of apprenticeship and trade related areas.

The School for Young Moms enables pregnant teens and mothers under the age of 21 to continue their high school education, develop their parenting skills, address their emotional, social, and physical needs, and receive onsite care for their infants. This is achieved with the assistance of professional staff and volunteers from a variety of community organizations, with Monday to Friday attendance expectations.

International Languages are offered to develop students' awareness of the spoken, written, and cultural aspects of several languages. These programs may connect the learners to their cultural roots or nurture an interest and skill base for learning languages in general. Some high school students will use credit courses in International Languages to help them graduate or to facilitate their entrance into specialized programs at the post-secondary level. Italian, Korean, Mandarin, Polish, and Spanish are currently offered at various levels at various campuses throughout the board.

== Campus ==
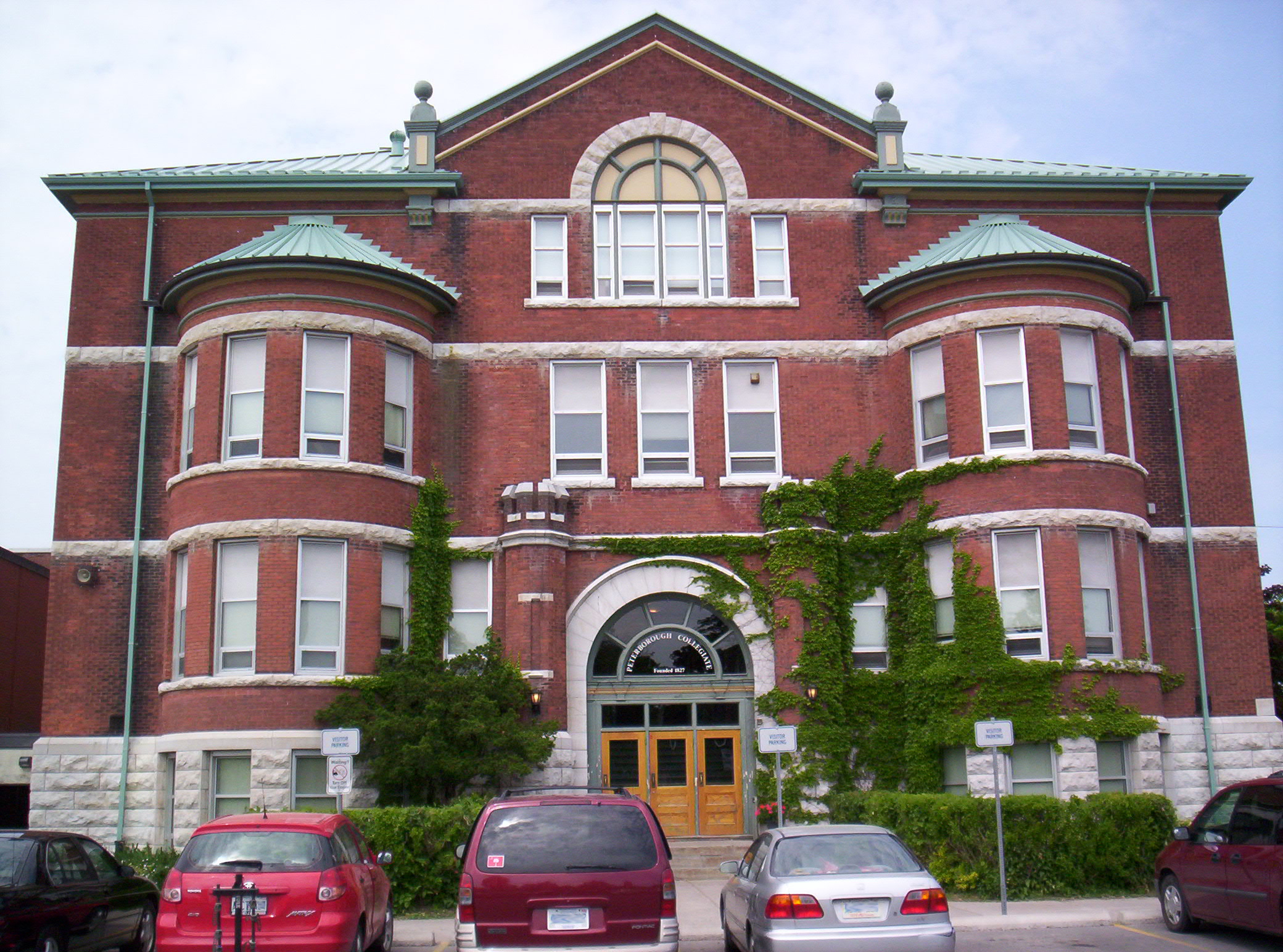
The front of the PCVS building.

The building is an example of restrained Richardsonian Romanesque architecture. The limestone used in the building was provided by the Longford quarries. Peterborough Collegiate consists of many regular classrooms as well as specialized rooms for certain classes. PCVS has four computer labs as well as a Resource Centre, a library, two gyms, a music room, two drama rooms and enough space for the sewing machines, video editing suites, art rooms and other special equipment for the various classes. PCVS is centrally located in the heart of downtown Peterborough across from City Hall, with easy access by public transportation. The school is used by numerous community groups after hours and on weekends.

The current school building was erected in 1908 and is historically significant to the community and was recently upgraded with emphasis on maintaining its architectural beauty. The walls of PCVS bear plaques that honour students who served and died in both World Wars and they are honoured every November 11 by current City of Peterborough as well as the Pagans Rugby Club.

== Notable alumni ==
- Les Ascott, CFL offensive guard with theToronto Argonauts, winner of five Grey Cups, had his number 52 retired and had his name added to the Wall of Honour at Toronto's Rogers Centre in 2004
- Jim Balsillie, chairman and co-CEO of Research In Motion
- Nicholas Dominic Beck, lawyer, the first Vice-Chancellor of the University of Alberta (1908–1926), served as a judge on the Alberta Supreme Court (1921–1928)
- Gary Botting, lawyer, legal scholar, playwright, and poet who while a student at P.C.V.S. won top honors at the Ontario and U.S. National Science Fairs for his exhibit on hybridizing moths.
- Alexander Francis Chamberlain, anthropologist, linguist, received the first PhD ever granted in the field of anthropology in the United States
- Lawrence Cherney, Artistic Director of Soundstreams Canada
- Seán Cullen, comedian
- Peter Demos, Emeritus Professor of physics at MIT, nuclear physicist, who served as a science advisor to President John F. Kennedy
- Charles Dorrington, Canadian Anglican bishop and choirmaster
- Evelyn Hart, Canadian ballerina and former principal dancer with the Royal Winnipeg Ballet, member of the Order of Canada
- Hugh Kenner, Canadian literary scholar, critic and professor
- Robert Richard Hall, lawyer, a Liberal member of the House of Commons of Canada 1904–1908
- Sir Frederick William Alpin Gordon Haultain, the first premier of Canada's North-West Territories
- Thomas Edvard Krogh, geochronologist and former curator for the Royal Ontario Museum
- John Allmond Marsh, a Conservative member of the House of Commons of Canada, 1937–1940
- Michael Moldaver, Supreme Court of Canada
- Frank Patrick O'Connor, politician, businessman, philanthropist, founder of Laura Secord Chocolates and Fanny Farmer
- Lester B. Pearson, 14th Prime Minister of Canada
- Edward Armour Peck, a Conservative member of the House of Commons of Canada, 1925–1935
- Gordon Roper, Chair of English at University of Trinity College (Toronto), senior founder of Massey College
- Serena Ryder, Juno Award winning singer/songwriter
- David Paul Smith, Member of the Canadian Senate
- Maryam Monsef, Member of Parliament - Peterborough-Kawartha, Minister of Status of Women, Minister of International Development
- Kelly McMichael, singer-songwriter

== Notable staff ==
- Fern Rahmel, writer, playwright and regular contributor to CBC Radio
