= Senator O'Connor =

Senator O'Connor may refer to:

- Edmund O'Connor (1848–1898), New York State Senate
- Edward T. O'Connor Jr. (born 1942), New Jersey State Senate
- Frank D. O'Connor (1909–1992), New York State Senate
- Frank Patrick O'Connor (1885–1939), State Senate of Canada
  - Senator O'Connor College School, named for Frank Patrick O'Connor
- Michael J. O'Connor (politician) (1928–2018), South Dakota State Senate
- Patrick O'Connor (Massachusetts politician) (born 1984), Massachusetts State Senate
- Sandra Day O'Connor (born 1930), Arizona State Senate

== See also ==
- Herbert O'Conor (1896–1960), U.S. Senator from Maryland from 1947 to 1953
