= List of people from Peterborough, Ontario =

Peterborough and its surrounding area is and has been home to many notable people, especially considering its relatively small size. It has been especially prolific in producing players for the NHL through the Peterborough Petes. It also has produced a number of musicians, actors and authors.

== Actors ==
- Matt Frewer, known for playing Max Headroom
- Ben Hollingsworth
- Barclay Hope
- William Hope
- Linda Kash
- David Kaye, voice actor
- Gordon Sackville, silent film actor
- Estella Warren, former synchronized swimmer; model and actress

== Athletes ==
- Les Ascott, (d. 2013) former CFL player with the Toronto Argonauts
- Zac Bierk, former professional hockey player and brother of Sebastian Bach
- Scotty Bowman, former hockey coach, Detroit Red Wings, Montreal Canadiens
- Steve Chiasson, (1967–1999) National Hockey League player
- Doug Crossman, former NHL player
- John Druce, former NHL player with Washington Capitals, Winnipeg Jets, Los Angeles Kings and Philadelphia Flyers
- Vince Dunn, NHL player with the Seattle Kraken
- Bob Errey Former NHL Player/Current Broadcaster with the Pittsburgh Penguins
- Shawn Evans, NLL player with the Buffalo Bandits
- Mike Fisher, former NHL player with the Nashville Predators; husband of Carrie Underwood
- Carl Fitzgerald, CFL player with the Saskatchewan Roughriders
- Bob Gainey, former NHL player and now General Manager with the Montreal Canadiens
- Rex Harrington, ballet dancer
- Barrett Hayton, NHL player with the Arizona Coyotes
- Mike Keenan, former NHL coach with the Calgary Flames
- Tracey Kelusky, lacrosse player
- Steve Larmer, former NHL player with the Chicago Blackhawks and New York Rangers
- Johnny Mark, former CFL player
- Porter Martone, NHL player with the Philadelphia Flyers
- Rick McCrank, professional skateboarder
- Greg Millen, hockey analyst, goaltender for the NHL
- Roger Neilson, (1934–2003) innovative NHL coach who spent ten years coaching the Peterborough Petes
- Corey Perry, NHL player with the Tampa Bay Lightning, Stanley Cup winner (2007), Olympic Gold Medalist (2010)
- Gabe Robinson, CFL player with Toronto Argonauts, Grey Cup Champion 2004.
- Bobby Roode, professional wrestler working for WWE
- Marc Savard, professional hockey player
- Brad Sinopoli, CFL player with the Ottawa Redblacks
- Mitchell Stephens, NHL player
- Cory Stillman, former NHL player
- Greg Theberge, former NHL player, Calder Cup winner (1980). Grandson of Dit Clapper
- Owen Tippett, NHL player
- Jared Wayne, NFL player with the Houston Texans
- Chris White, lacrosse player
- Jesse Young, professional basketball player with MMT Estudiantes in the Spanish Liga ACB

== Musicians ==
- Greg Wells, Grammy winning record producer, musician and songwriter
- Sebastian Bach, Skid Row
- Tebey, country singer, pop
- Adam Gontier, singer, songwriter and guitarist of Saint Asonia and prior lead singer of Three Days Grace
- Emily Haines, musician, lead singer of Metric
- Ronnie Hawkins, rock musician, resided in Lakefield (Peterborough County)
- Ramin Karimloo, singer, songwriter, West End/Broadway performer
- Trevor McNevan, lead singer of rock band Thousand Foot Krutch
- Luke Nicholson, singer, songwriter
- Serena Ryder, singer and songwriter
- Neil Sanderson, drummer of Three Days Grace
- Christian Tanna, brother of Jagori Tanna; co-founder of the band I Mother Earth
- Jagori Tanna, brother of Christian Tanna; co-founder of the band I Mother Earth
- Rob Wells, songwriter and record producer
- Royal Wood, singer, songwriter

== Politicians ==
- George Albertus Cox (1840–1914), former mayor, Canadian Senator
- Dean Del Mastro
- Gerard Kennedy, 2006 Liberal leadership candidate, studied at Trent University
- Peter Robinson (1785–1838), Lieutenant-Governor of Ontario
- Robert Smeaton White (1856–1944), Canadian Journalist and Member of Parliament

== Religion ==
- Alden John Bell, Roman Catholic bishop

== Writers ==
- Dave Carley, playwright
- Robertson Davies, (1913–1995), novelist, playwright, critic, journalist and professor
- Manly Palmer Hall, philosopher and mystical author
- Hugh Kenner, scholar of modernist literature
- Yann Martel, winner of the Booker Prize, studied philosophy at Peterborough's Trent University
- Paul Nicholas Mason, author of The Night Drummer, Battered Soles, The Red Dress and A Pug Called Poppy
- Derek McCormack, writer
- Leah McLaren, journalist, author
- Susanna Moodie, 19th-century author
- Willard Price, (1887-1983), journalist, author
- Jennifer Robson, novelist
- Ian Rogers, horror writer
- Catherine Parr Traill, 19th-century author

== Other ==
- Seán Cullen (born 1965), comedian, radio personality
- Peter Demos (1918–2012), MIT physicist, former director of Bates Linear Accelerator
- Kathryn Durst, artist and illustrator
- Joseph Flavelle (1858–1939), businessman, Baron
- Jeffrey Karp (born 1976), bioengineering researcher, Harvard professor
- Trevor Kincaid (1872–1970), zoologist at the University of Washington
- John D. Lowry (1932–2012), film restoration expert
- Dan O'Toole (born 1975), TSN SportsCentre anchor
- Peter Woodcock (1939–2010), serial killer
