= Mary Ward Catholic Secondary School =

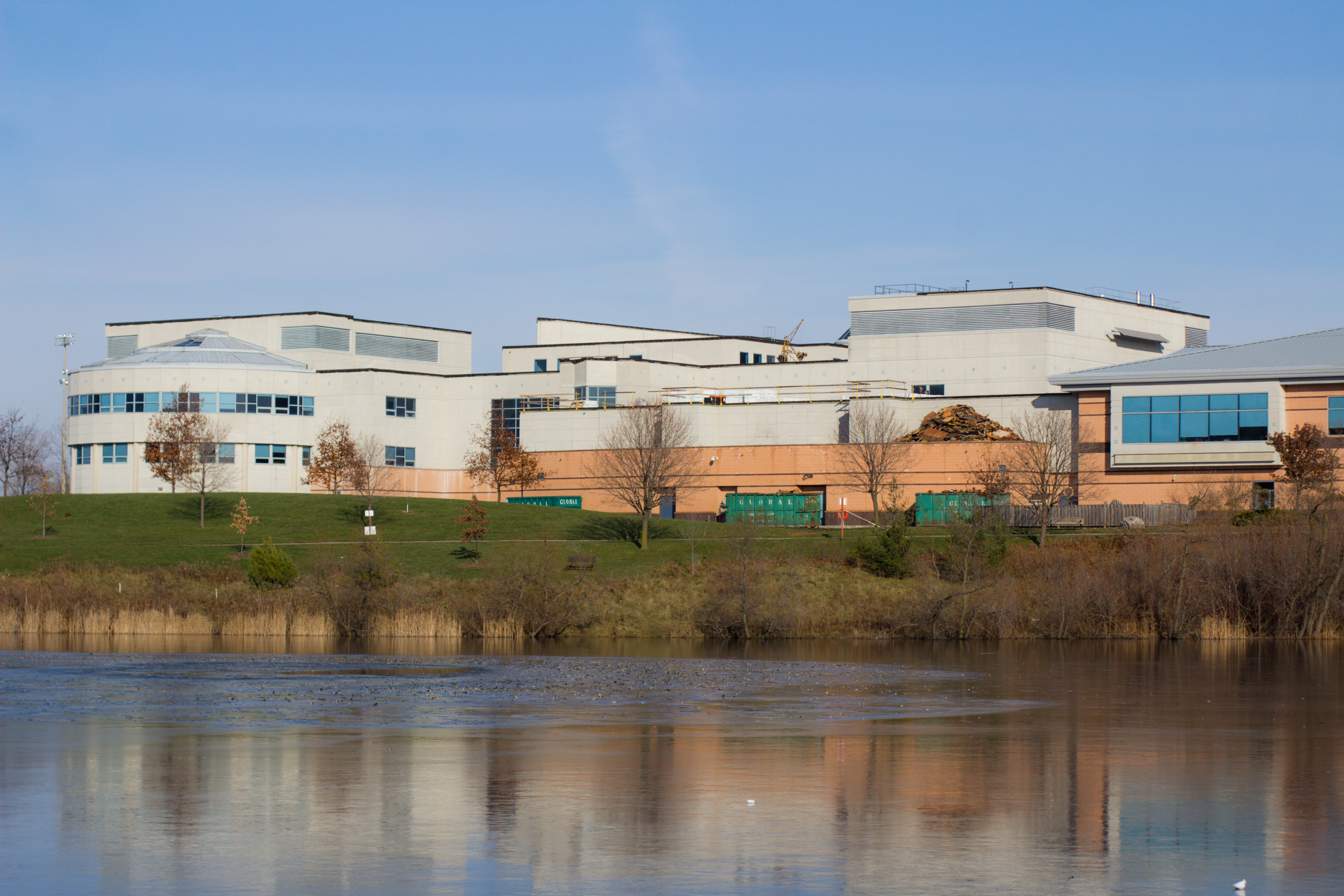
- A view of the school across the pond in nearby L'Amoreaux Park

Location
- 3200 Kennedy Road; Toronto, Ontario, M1V 3S8; Canada; 43.8127°N 79.3050°W

Information
- School type: Catholic High school
- Motto: Because We Believe
- Religious affiliations: Roman Catholic (Loretto Sisters)
- Founded: January 23, 1985; 41 years ago on Canongate Trail
- School board: Toronto Catholic District School Board; Metropolitan Separate School Board
- Superintendent: Kevin Malcolm; Area 7
- Area trustee: Mike Del Grande; Ward 7
- School number: 544 / 730882
- Principal: Michael Wetzel
- Grades: 9–12 (Non-semestered)
- Enrolment: 1066 (2017–18)
- Language: English
- Area: Northwest Scarborough
- Colours: Red and Blue
- Team name: Ward Wolverines
- Newspaper: Mary Ward Planet
- Website: www.tcdsb.org/o/maryward

Mary Ward Catholic Secondary School (abbreviated Mary Ward C.S.S., MWCSS, MW, Mary Ward, or simply Ward) is a Catholic secondary school in Toronto, Ontario, Canada. It is administered by the Toronto Catholic District School Board, formerly the Metropolitan Separate School Board. Mary Ward is a centre of self-directed learning and a member of the Canadian Coalition of Self-Directed Learning. It is one of only two self-directed learning schools currently in Ontario and seven in Canada.

The school was founded in 1985 as a conventional high school between two campuses in northeast Toronto until it moved into a new building at Kennedy Rd. and McNicoll Ave., designed specifically for its self-directed learning program (formerly called Direction 2000) in January 1992. The school is named after Mary Ward, a seventeenth-century English Catholic nun who founded the Sisters of Loreto.

== History ==
Mary Ward Catholic Secondary School started out as two campuses known as the "Tin Can", one which later became Cardinal Carter Academy for the Arts and a demolished relocatable. It was founded on January 23, 1985, during the 400th anniversary of Mary Ward's birth, as a conventional high school in northeast Toronto under the leadership of the first principal, Mary Anne O'Leary with 200 students. The school came to existence due to overcrowding population secondary schools at Francis Libermann and Senator O'Connor. The North Campus of Mary Ward was situated on 25 Canongate Trail at Birchmount and Steeles with 102 students in relocatables; the South Campus is located at 36 Greenfield Avenue with 47 students until they were consolidated in the Canongate campus in 1986 with 400 students.

By 1987, another "South Campus" was built with 600 students and 70 portables on the present site at 3200 Kennedy Road. The modern building for 861 students was built and completed by September 1991 as the school was opened and blessed in January 1992, designed specifically for its self-directed learning program (formerly called Direction 2000 established in the late 1980s). By the 1992–93 school year, the school had grown to over 1,000 students.

In 1995, MWCSS became a founding member of the Canadian Coalition of Self-Directed Learning Schools (CCSDL). By 1996, the school had an independent learning system. Sandra Gionas of the Toronto Star in 1996 explained, "There are no classes or classrooms at Mary Ward. It's sometimes said the teachers don't teach. There's no first period or second period, no semester system or terms. And students decide when to write exams."

== Campus ==
The current Mary Ward campus shares 26 acres of land with the L'Amoreaux Community Centre that is also attached to the school.

With Mary Ward built for the self-directed learning program, the existing configuration shares several classrooms with the community centre, plus a gymnasium, a cafetorium, an atrium, a student services area, several technological labs, a chapel, and a day care room.

A large parking lot is on the eastern side of the property where the portables previously stood. The school has a 400m running track and soccer/football field with a baseball diamond on the northern side of the school.

== Operations ==
The school does not use a set schedule, and students do self-paced learning. There are no specific designated areas set as classrooms. In 2024, the school has a higher number of students leaving prior to graduation than other area high schools because of students being unable to adjust to self-paced learning.

== Culture ==
In 2015, Karen K. Ho stated in Toronto Life that the school "was something of an anomaly" since it had "a decidedly bohemian vibe" despite having a "strict dress code" and "the usual high academic standards".

== Notable alumni ==
- Craig Kielburger — co-founder of Free The Children
- Pat Mastroianni — actor
- Jennifer Pan — convicted murderer (did not graduate)
- Cassie Steele — actor
- Phylicia George — Canadian Olympian

== See also ==
- Education in Ontario
- List of secondary schools in Ontario
