= Francis Libermann Catholic High School =

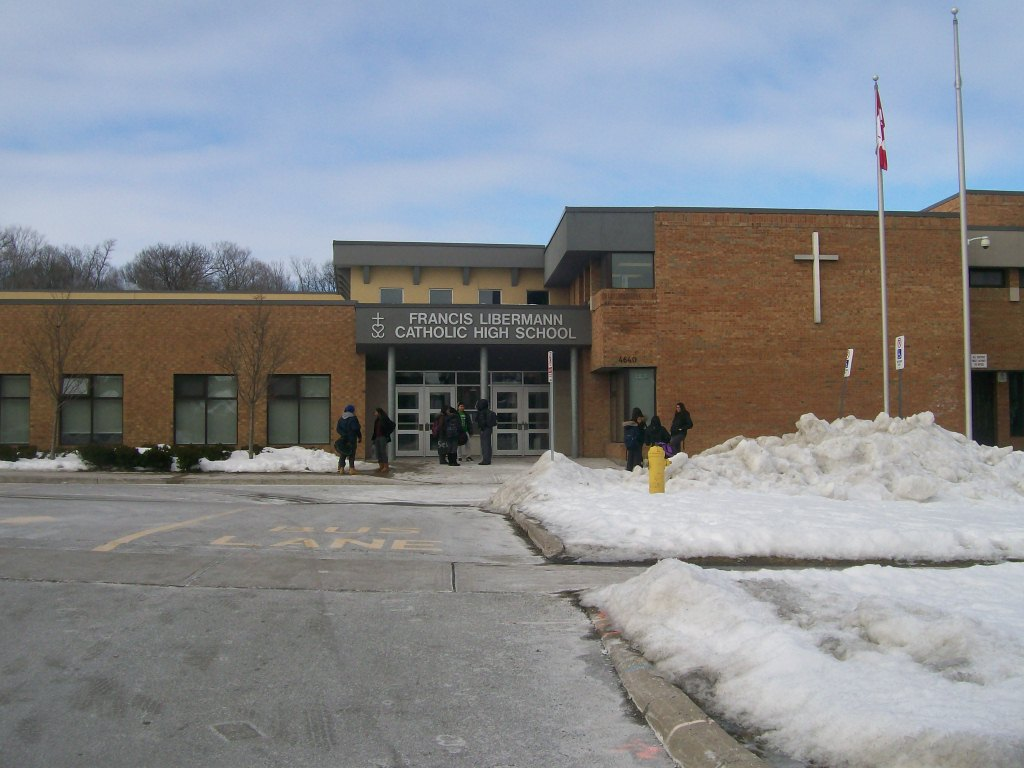

Location
- 4640 Finch Avenue East; Toronto, Ontario, M1S 4G2; Canada; 43.807109°N 79.274281°W

Information
- School type: Catholic High school
- Motto: Inter Mutanda Constantia (Steadfast in the midst of change)
- Religious affiliations: Roman Catholic (Holy Ghost Fathers)
- Founded: 1977
- School board: Toronto Catholic District School Board (Metropolitan Separate School Board)
- Superintendent: Peter Aguiar; Area 7
- Area trustee: Garry Tanuan; Ward 8
- School number: 524 / 707708; 524 / 706078
- Administrator: Jennifer Giannone
- Principal: Gabriele Piccolo
- Grades: 9-12 (Non-Semestered)
- Enrollment: 815 (2024-2025)
- Language: English
- Colours: Blackwatch plaid, Blue, Light Blue, and Green
- Team name: Libermann Falcons
- Parish: Prince of Peace
- Website: Francis Libermann CHS

Francis Libermann Catholic High School (alternatively known as Francis Libermann CHS, Libermann High, FLCHS, FL, Francis Libermann, or Libermann) is a Catholic secondary school (as of 2003, an elementary school as well) in Toronto, Ontario, Canada. It is located in the Agincourt neighbourhood of Scarborough, and part of the Toronto Catholic District School Board, formerly the Metropolitan Separate School Board.

The school is named after the priest Francis Libermann, a French Jewish convert to Roman Catholicism in the 19th century and the "Second Founder" of the Congregation of the Holy Spirit. It was initially founded in 1977 as a semi-private school. It became a public separate school in 1986. Libermann is enrolled with 815 students as of 2024-2025 school year, and ranked 148 of 738 schools in Fraser Institute Report Card during the 2018-2019 school year. The motto is "Inter Mutanda Constantia" ("Steadfast in the midst of Change").

== History ==
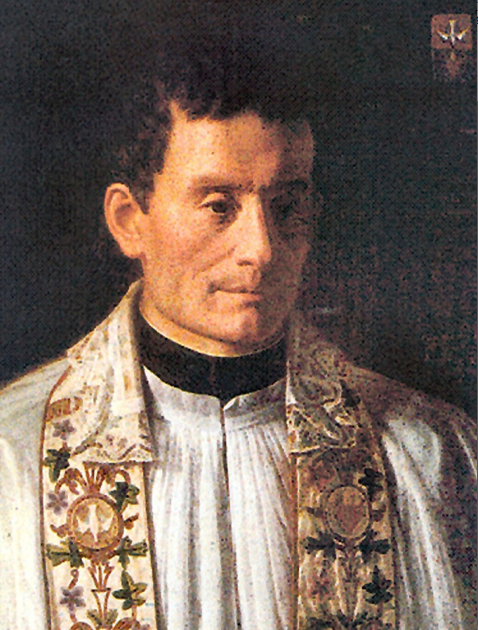
François Libermann, c. 1850

Since the openings of Neil McNeil High School (founded by the Spiritan Fathers) in 1958, John J. Lynch High School in 1963 and Cardinal Newman High School in 1973, most of northern Scarborough is underdeveloped before the 1970s. However, the area is served by several existing high schools: Agincourt Collegiate Institute, Sir John A. Macdonald Collegiate Institute, Stephen Leacock Collegiate Institute, and nearby Albert Campbell Collegiate Institute with the latter opened the year prior.

Francis Libermann Catholic High School was founded in 1977 under the direction of the Spiritan order and the Metropolitan Separate School Board, with Father John Geary CSSp as principal. Originally, Libermann was intended to be a middle school in the city of Toronto. The idea for the school usage was changed after the school was built and instead to be used by students of grades 9 to OAC.

The building was constructed in 1977 but was given its first enlarged, permanent three-storey building in 1981 to include multiple classrooms, a library, a wood shop and a double gymnasium/auditorium. Because this design accommodated a more petite student body, the school had to deal with perpetual overcrowding, requiring the construction of additions and alterations. Portables were built for the surplus of students. Over many years, the school underwent additional construction projects such as expanding the gymnasium, adding an annex, and adding an entirely new section containing an office, atrium and cafeteria, most notably in 2006.

From the beginning, Libermann was mainly a private school, with the MSSB assuming the responsibility for educating grade 9 and 10 students. From 1985 onwards, in the aftermath of the government announcement of the total funding of Roman Catholic high schools, Libermann ceased as a private school. The MSSB now has complete control of the school, with the Spiritans withdrawing day-to-day operations.

In 1986, the school had 1,100 students and 63 full-time staff members. During that year the school was overcrowded with students as it served an area of Scarborough with many new students. To resolve these issues, staff members devised a schedule involving required study halls for students with spare periods and separated up and down staircases. Only 100 or so students could be seated at the cafeteria during lunch hours, and the remainder had to eat lunches at their desks. The overcrowding resulted in the MSSB establishing two new schools in the northern Scarborough area in 1985: Mary Ward in Steeles/Willowdale using two campuses and Mother Teresa in Malvern.

In the summer of 2018, 2 additional portables were built due to increased enrolment.

== Overview ==
=== Surroundings ===
The school is surrounded by the Brimley Woods forest to the north, Royal Crown Academic School (Formerly Charles O' Bick Police Academy), a fire hall to the west, a ravine to the east, and an arterial road, Finch Avenue East to the south.

=== Transportation ===
The nearest bus stop, located outside of the school, is 39 Finch East to Finch Station. The closest intersection is Finch and Brimley Avenue, where there are stops for the 21 Brimley, 39 Finch West/East and 939 Finch Rocket bus routes.

=== Programs ===
Libermann High offers the required courses to obtain the diploma, as well as other elective courses. The former STEAM program at Libermann was replaced by Congregated AP. Apart from having many different courses, the majority have various teaching and grade levels – some are prerequisites to others.

=== Non-Semestered (Full-Year) System ===
Libermann High is one of a few schools in Toronto that still offer classes in a Full-Year (Non-Semestered) System. Students will not go an entire year without having math and obtain significantly higher marks in university prep classes on average. Libermann is host to elite academic students that benefit from being able to do year-long class projects to win awards.

=== Uniforms ===
During normal classes, students are expected to wear the school uniform – a combination of grey dress pants, a golf shirt, a polo sweater, a knit sweater, a kilt with school colours, and black shoes.

=== Campus ===
Libermann High accommodates a library and computer labs; some computers were donated through a Bill Gates program.

=== Student body ===
The FL Catholic Elementary School program began in 2003 and ended in the 2018–2019 school year. The number of students varies year to year from 750–1000, currently home to grades 9 to 12. Graduates may stay for a fifth year even after the termination of OAC.

== Notable alumni ==
- Serouj Kradjian - multiple Juno-winning and Grammy-nominated pianist, composer & arranger
- Teresa Pavlinek - actress and writer
- Dan-e-o - hip-hop artist and actor

== See also ==
- Education in Ontario
- List of secondary schools in Ontario
