= Arthur F. Kip =

American experimental physicist

Arthur Frederic Kip (27 September 1910, Los Angeles – 2 December 1995, Berkeley, California) was an American experimental physicist, specializing in solid-state physics. He was a Guggenheim Fellow for the academic year 1958–1959.

== Biography ==
After secondary education in San Diego, Kip matriculated at the University of California, Berkeley (UC Berkeley), where he graduated with A.B. in 1935 and Ph.D. in 1939. His doctoral advisor was Leonard B. Loeb.

Kip then went to MIT as a research associate. In World War II he started as an active member of the Anti-Submarine Warfare Operations Research Group in the Office of the Commander-in-Chief, U.S. Fleet. He went on to study fleet antiaircraft operations, from Okinawa to London, where he met and wed Joan Hill in 1944. After the war he went to MIT as an assistant professor and first worked on their microwave linear accelerator, and later on electron spin resonance. Characteristically, in an interesting community of Gropius disciples, he built his own house.

In the UC Berkeley physics department, Kip was a professor from 1951 to 1976, when he retired as professor emeritus. In the summer of 1951, he brought a considerable amount of equipment and used his expertise in electron spin resonance (ESR) to set up a laboratory with the help of Alan M. Portis and Thomas Griswold. The three of them built most of their own equipment. (Thomas Griswold (1925–2006) was a graduate student at UC Berkeley and received his Ph.D. there in 1953.) Kip's laboratory and research group used microwave resonance techniques to investigate solid-state physics. He was the author or co-author of almost 100 papers. He was for the academic year 1958–1959 a Guggenheim Fellow at the University of Cambridge, UK and for the academic year 1962–1963 a Miller Institute Fellow at Berkeley.

Kip has to his credit the first observation of ESR in metals, of donor spin resonance in semiconductors and, above all, in 1953, of cyclotron resonance in semiconductors and metals. The results of the cyclotron resonance studies defined for the first time the dynamic properties of the positive carriers and holes, which are essential to transistor-type devices.

He wrote a successful introductory college textbook Fundamentals of Electricity and Magnetism (McGraw-Hill, 1962; 2nd edition, 1968). His doctoral students include Peter Demos, George Feher, Donald N. Langenberg, and Alan M. Portis.

Upon his death, Kip was survived by his widow, a daughter, a son, and two grandchildren.

== Selected publications ==
- Loeb, L. B.; Kip, A. F.; Einarsson, A. W. (1938). "On the Nature of Ionic Sign Preference in C. T. R. Wilson Cloud Chamber Condensation Experiments". The Journal of Chemical Physics. 6 (5): 264–273. Bibcode:1938JChPh...6..264L. doi:10.1063/1.1750242.
- Loeb, Leonard B.; Kip, Arthur F. (1939). "Electrical Discharges in Air at Atmospheric Pressure the Nature of the Positive and Negative Point‐to‐Plane Coronas and the Mechanism of Spark Propagation". Journal of Applied Physics. 10 (3): 142–160. Bibcode:1939JAP....10..142L. doi:10.1063/1.1707290.
- Demos, P. T.; Kip, A. F.; Slater, J. C. (1952). "The M.I.T. Linear Electron Accelerator". Journal of Applied Physics. 23 (1): 53–65. Bibcode:1952JAP....23...53D. doi:10.1063/1.1701978.
- Kip, Arthur F. (1953). "Microwave Resonance Absorption in Gadolinium Metal". Reviews of Modern Physics. 25 (1): 229–231. Bibcode:1953RvMP...25..229K. doi:10.1103/RevModPhys.25.229.
- Feher, George; Kip, A. F. (1955). "Electron Spin Resonance Absorption in Metals. I. Experimental". Physical Review. 98 (2): 337–348. Bibcode:1955PhRv...98..337F. doi:10.1103/PhysRev.98.337.
- Dresselhaus, G.; Kip, A. F.; Kittel, C. (1955). "Cyclotron Resonance of Electrons and Holes in Silicon and Germanium Crystals". Physical Review. 98 (2): 368–384. Bibcode:1955PhRv...98..368D. doi:10.1103/PhysRev.98.368.
- Kip, Arthur F. (1960). "Cyclotron resonance in solids". Contemporary Physics. 1 (5): 355–369. Bibcode:1960ConPh...1..355K. doi:10.1080/00107516008204431. ISSN 0010-7514.
- Kip, A. F.; Langenberg, D. N.; Moore, T. W. (1961). "Cyclotron Resonance in Copper". Physical Review. 124 (2): 359–372. Bibcode:1961PhRv..124..359K. doi:10.1103/PhysRev.124.359.
- Koch, J. F.; Stradling, R. A.; Kip, A. F. (1964). "Some New Aspects of Cyclotron Resonance in Copper". Physical Review. 133 (1A): A240 – A252. Bibcode:1964PhRv..133..240K. doi:10.1103/PhysRev.133.A240.
- Kip, Arthur F. (1965). "The Role of the Fermi Surface in Low Temperature Physics". Low Temperature Physics LT9. p. 679. doi:10.1007/978-1-4899-6443-4_7. ISBN 978-1-4899-6217-1.
