= Fern Rahmel =

Canadian writer and educator

Fern Alma Rahmel (1914 – November 28, 2009) was a Canadian writer and educator.

== Early life and education ==
Rahmel was born in Peterborough, Ontario, and graduated from Queen's University in 1940.

== Career ==
Rahmel taught in elementary and later secondary schools. In 1970, she had been a Peterborough teacher for 20 years with the English Department of the Peterborough Collegiate and Vocational School, becoming the head of the English Department before she retired. Rahmel wrote book reviews for Saturday Night, which she describes in a 2009 book about the Canadian writer Robertson Davies written by Val Ross. Rahmel aided Robertson Davies in research while he was editor of the Peterborough Examiner and, as described in Ross's book, Rahmel served as the stage director at the Peterborough Little Theatre for a series of plays at the encouragement of Davies. The interactions between Davies and Rahmel are also described in Judith Skelton Grant's book Robertson Davies: Man of Myth.

Rahmel also wrote children's educational radio plays leading to the production of more than 60 scripts by the Canadian Broadcasting Company. She gave talks to the Peterborough Historical Society, and published a paper on Frederick Montague de la Fosse, Peterborough's first librarian. Rahmel's writing includes a chapter on theatre that was included in a 1967 anthology of pieces about Peterborough, and was cited by the Heritage Gazette during their discussion of historical theatre in the city. She has also detailed the history of women in education in Peterborough. She was also assistant to Gwyn Kinsey, editor of Saturday Night.

Upon her death, Rahmel made a gift to Trent University which was the third largest received by the university and established the Fern A. Rahmel Bursary there for women who may have been delayed in their ability to attend college.

== Honours and awards ==
In their 1970 Spring Convocation, Trent University awarded her an honorary Doctor of Laws degree, and the citation included the following statements:

... There have always been exceptional teachers whose prime objective has been the encouragement of both academic and social development rather than strict academic and social discipline. As a result of such an approach, the student is able to prepare himself not 'to fit into a mould' but rather to create for himself his own unique position in society. Such an educator is Miss Fern Rahmel. In the classroom she has encouraged students to develop at their own speed. Under her tutelage, the student did not necessarily know what truth was, but he did know what it was to seek the truth..."

— William R. Douglas

In 1987, she was given an honorary life membership in the Peterborough Kiwanis Musical Festival.

== Personal life ==
One of Rahmel's interests was gardening, especially roses and peonies. She was an alternate Canadian delegate to the International Federation of University Women meeting in Japan, and published an account on the gardens she observed in a 1975 article published by the Canadian Rose Society.
