= Alexander Francis Chamberlain =

Canadian anthropologist (1865–1914)

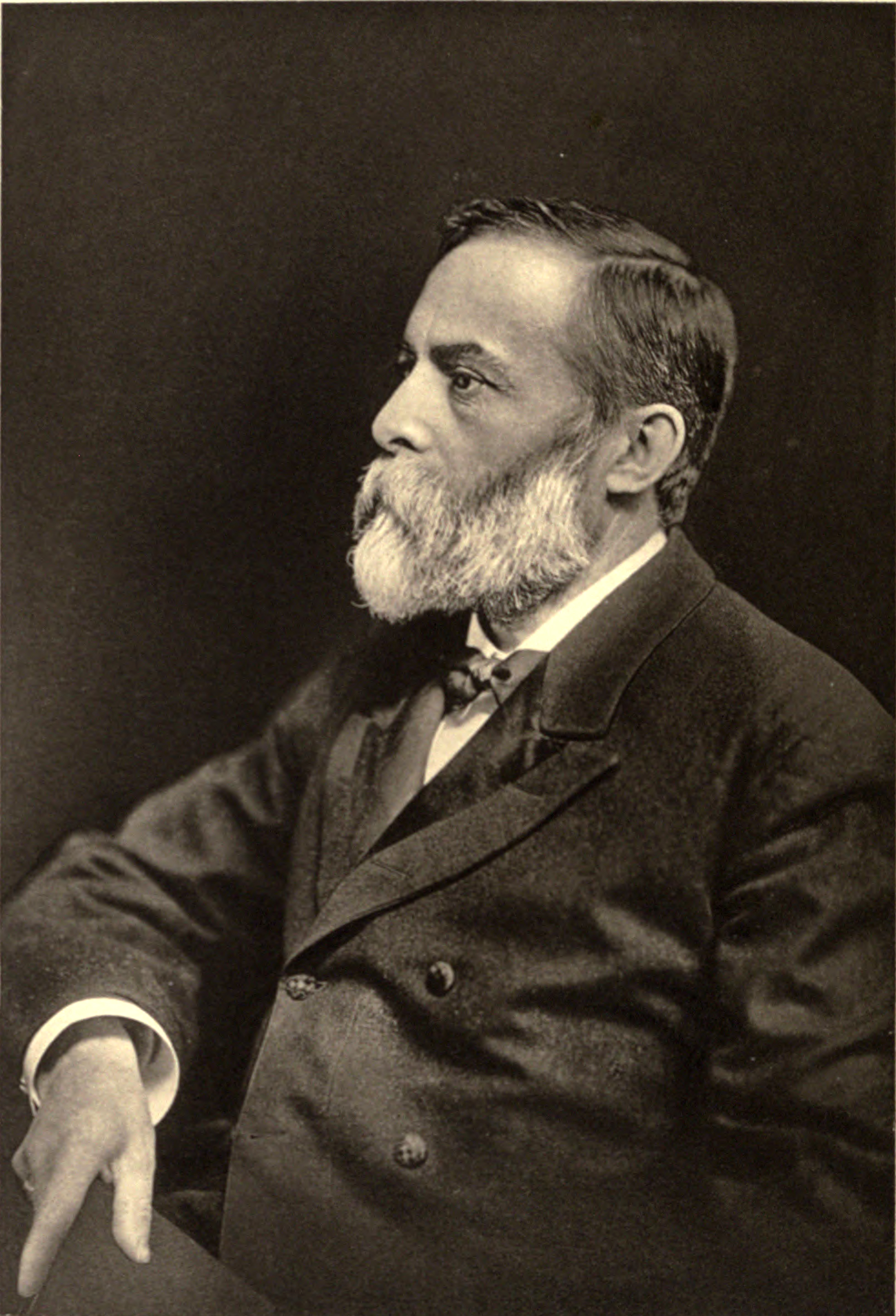
Alexander F. Chamberlain

Alexander Francis Chamberlain (January 12, 1865 – April 8, 1914) was a Canadian anthropologist, born in England. Under the direction of Franz Boas he received the first Ph.D. granted in anthropology in the United States, from Clark University in Worcester, Massachusetts. After graduating, he taught at Clark, eventually becoming full professor in 1911. Under the auspices of the British Association, his area of specialty was the Kootenay (British Columbia) Indians.

== Early life and education ==
Alexander Francis Chamberlain was born in Kenninghall, Norfolk, England, the eldest child of George and Maria Anderton Chamberlain. His family emigrated to North America when he was a child, settling in Bushnell's Basin, New York, where he began schooling. After about a year, his family relocated to Peterborough, Ontario, Canada, where Chamberlain attended the Union School and the Peterborough Collegiate Institute. He then studied modern languages at the University of Toronto, graduating with a B.A. in 1886.

== Career ==
Chamberlain was well known in anthropology for his bibliographic work, compiling the lists of new books and articles that appeared in the early issues of the American Anthropologist and later the Journal of American Folklore. He was editor of the Journal of American Folklore between 1901 and 1908. His works include:

- Report on the Kootenay Indians, (1892)
- Languages of the Mississaga Indians, (1892)
- The Mythology of the Columbian Discovery, (1893)
- Child and Childhood in Folk-Thought, (1896)
- The Child: A Study in the Evolution of Man, (1900)
- Poems, (1904)

He also contributed to the second edition of the New International Encyclopedia on South American Indians and Asian peoples, and to the 1911 Encyclopædia Britannica on North American Indians. Chamberlain was elected a member of the American Antiquarian Society in 1902.
