= Soundstreams =

- Born: Chamber Concerts Canada
- Origin: Toronto, Ontario, Canada
- Genre: Classical
- Occupation: Presenter
- Years active: 1982–present
- Members: Artistic Director; Lawrence Cherney
- Website: www.soundstreams.ca

Soundstreams is a Toronto-based music presenter that commissions, develops, and showcases the work of contemporary Canadian and international composers. It was established in 1982 by Artistic Director and oboe player Lawrence Cherney, and has commissioned more than 150 works over the past three decades.

A season features a concert series at Koerner Hall, with each concert featuring usually featuring a world premiere by a Canadian composer, as well as Canadian and international performers. Composers who have written for Soundstreams include R. Murray Schafer, Steve Reich, Harry Somers, James Rolfe, and Alexina Louie. Performers have included Gryphon Trio, soprano Shannon Mercer, percussion ensemble Nexus.

Other projects have included festivals and conferences such as the Northern Encounters festival, University Voices, Toronto Fanfare Project, and Cool Drummings percussion festival and conference, as well as new productions such as Thomson Highway and Melissa Hui’s Cree opera Pimooteewin: The Journey and R. Murray Schafer’s Dora Award-winning site-specific opera The Children’s Crusade.

Soundstreams has been nominated for three Juno Awards, is the recipient of two Lieutenant Governor’s Awards for the Arts, and Lawrence Cherney is a member of the Order of Canada.

Soundstreams is the producer of the first-ever Cree language opera Pimooteewin: The Journey with libretto by Tomson Highway and music by Melissa Hui. In October 2016, a Soundstreams concert celebrated the versatility of the modern flute, and in 2017 the company mounted a music and theatre production about the life and ideas of Quebecois composer Claude Vivier.
