= Leonard Benedict Loeb =

Swiss-born American physicist (1898–1978)

- Born: September 16, 1891; Zürich, Switzerland
- Died: June 17, 1978 (aged 86); Monterey, California, U.S.
- Education: University of Chicago
- Known for: Gaseous electronics
- Children: Anne Bredon
- Scientific career
- Fields: Physics
- Workplaces: University of California, Berkeley
- Doctoral advisor: Robert Andrews Millikan
- Doctoral students: Norris Bradbury; Arthur F. Kip

Leonard Benedict Loeb (September 16, 1891 – June 17, 1978) was a Swiss-born American physicist. He was the son of physiologist and biologist Jacques Loeb.

== Bibliography ==
- Leonard B. Loeb (March 2013). Fundamental Processes of Electrical Discharge in Gases. Literary Licensing, LLC. ISBN 978-1-258-60430-1.
- Leonard B. Loeb (2004). The Kinetic Theory of Gases. Courier Corporation. ISBN 978-0-486-49572-9.
- Leonard B. Loeb (March 2007). Fundamentals of Electricity & Magnetism. Read Books. ISBN 978-1-4067-0733-5.

== Archival collections ==
- Leonard B. Loeb student notebooks, 1914-1915, Niels Bohr Library & Archives
