= Senator O'Connor College School =

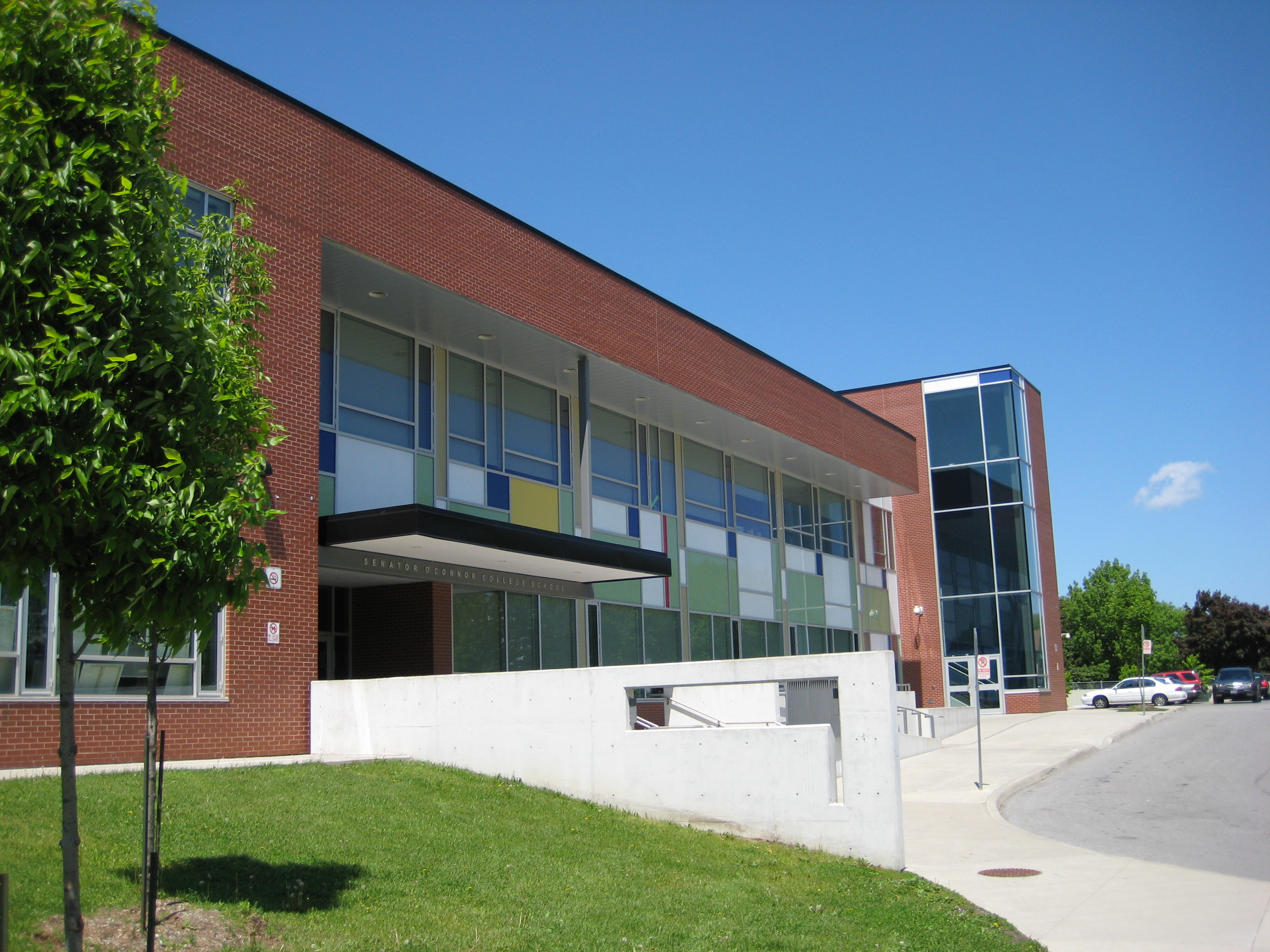

Location
- 60 Rowena Drive; North York, Toronto, Ontario, M3A 3R2; Canada; 43°45′02″N 79°19′02″W

Information
- Former name: John J. Lynch High School (1963–1967)
- School type: Catholic, High school
- Motto: Audax et Fidelis (Courageous and Faithful)
- Religious affiliations: Roman Catholic (Brothers of the Christian Schools and Daughters of Wisdom)
- Founded: 1963
- School board: Toronto Catholic District School Board
- Superintendent: Roy Fernandes; Area 6
- Area trustee: Angela Kennedy; Ward 11
- School number: 505 / 763772
- Principal: Linton Soares
- Grades: 9-12
- Enrolment: 1280 (2022-2023)
- Language: English
- Area: North York, Ontario
- Colours: Blue and Gold
- Team name: O'Connor Blues
- Feeder schools: See below
- Parish: Annunciation
- Specialist High Skills Major: Business; Sports
- Program Focus: Advanced Placement; Extended French; French Immersion; Gifted
- Website: www.tcdsb.org/o/senatoroconnor

Senator O'Connor College School (also called SOCS, Senator O'Connor CS, Senator O'Connor, OCS, or simply Senator or O'Connor), previously known as John J. Lynch High School until 1967 is a Separate high school in the Parkwoods neighbourhood in the North York district of Toronto, Ontario, Canada serving grades 9 to 12 in the communities of Wexford, Maryvale, Don Mills, and Dorset Park.

The school was named after Senator Frank O'Connor, founder of the Laura Secord chocolate company. The school is part of the Toronto Catholic District School Board and was originally founded as John J. Lynch High School in 1963, named after the first archbishop of Toronto from 1870 to 1888, John Joseph Lynch. It had 1,414 students as of March 2018, and was ranked 266 of 738 secondary schools in the 2017-18 Fraser Institute School Report Card.

== History ==
=== The story ===
Frank Patrick O'Connor was a Canadian politician, businessman, philanthropist. He was the founder of Laura Secord Chocolates and Fanny Farmer, and the namesake behind O'Connor Drive in Toronto. He is the son of Mary Eleanor McKeown and Patrick O'Connor, O'Connor quit school at the age of 14 and started working at Canadian General Electric in Peterborough. He married Mary Ellen Hayes and moved with her to Toronto in 1912. He opened the Laura Secord Candy Store on Yonge Street in 1913 as he expanded the store across Canada and into the United States where it was known as Fanny Farmer Candy Stores.

As a Roman Catholic, he gave $500,000 in the 1930s to the Archdiocese of Toronto under the trusteeship of Cardinal James Charles McGuigan. O'Connor was appointed to the Senate of Canada in 1935 by Liberal Prime Minister William Lyon Mackenzie King. He represented the senatorial division of Scarborough Junction, Ontario until his death in 1939. O'Connor survived his wife, who died in 1931, and died at this estate at age 54.

=== The school history ===
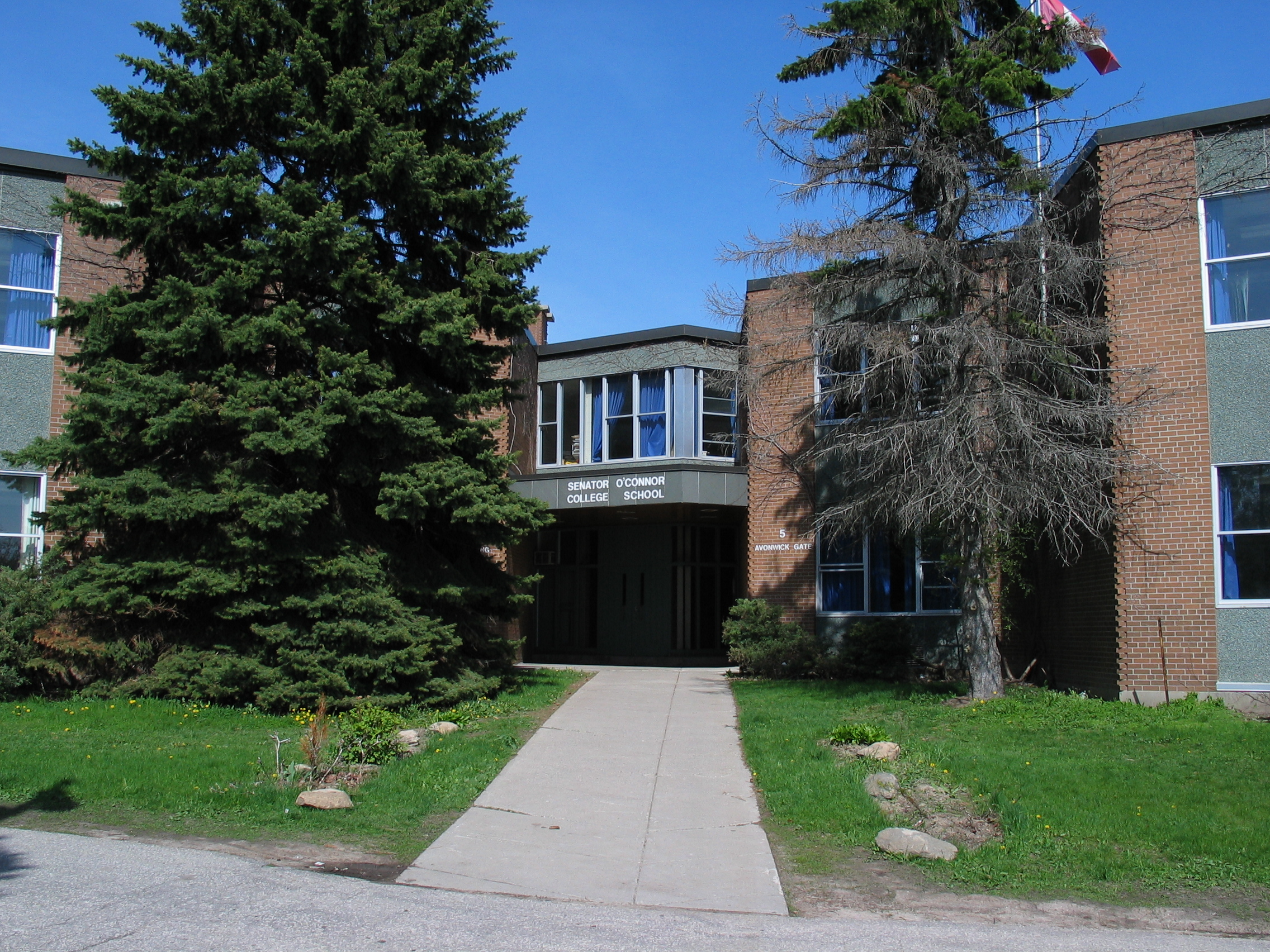
The original Senator O'Connor campus building on 5 Avonwick Drive

Prior to the founding of Senator O'Connor College School, several high schools were established around that area after the openings of Winston Churchill Collegiate Institute in Scarborough (1954), Don Mills Collegiate Institute (1957) and nearby Victoria Park Collegiate Institute (1960). In the meantime, several catholic separate schools within the Metropolitan Separate School Board (MSSB, renamed later to the Toronto Catholic District School Board) were opened such as St. Teresa Separate School, Wexford in 1950 (Note: Later renamed to Precious Blood Separate School in 1953 and is located on Pharmacy Avenue.) and Annunciation Separate School in 1965.

Senator O'Connor College School was founded by the Brothers of the Christian Schools and the Daughters of Wisdom in 1963 as John J. Lynch High School, becoming the first co-educational Catholic school in the Toronto archdiocese. In 1965, the second school building designed in an hexagon by Fisher Tedman Architects was erected, given the name Senator O’Connor College School with Brother Denis F.S.C. as its inaugurating principal. Starting in the 1967–68 school year, the "Senator O'Connor" name became the name for the whole school combining the Lynch and O'Connor buildings while the ninth and tenth grades were placed by the MSSB while grades 11–13 continued to be taught by their religious orders. The high school was built on land given to them by Senator Frank Patrick O'Connor, a Catholic philanthropist and founder of Laura Secord Chocolates, a Canadian chocolatier and ice cream company.

Senator O'Connor's House and Garage, and another building, belonging to the Christian Brothers, still exist on campus, and the Christian Brothers still lived there as a Provincial Office up until 2002.

In the 1970s, the Christian Brothers were an active part of school life, teaching classes, holding positions in the school administration and assisting with cafeteria monitoring. The administration of the school was turned over to lay teachers in 1973.

The school used to be split up into three main structures: the main O'Connor building, the JJ Lynch building, and a later addition of a complex of portables under one roof called the "Taj" or the "Taj Mahal". There was also another area with over a half dozen portables. There used to be an indoor swimming pool connected to the house, but it was torn down sometime in the late 1980s or early 90s. The Christian Brothers' house was located in the center of the campus, and so students would pass right in front of it or around it on all sides daily.

In 1984, when the Province of Ontario decided that Catholic secondary schools were to be fully funded, the school became publicly funded by 1987, and Senator O'Connor ceased being a private school. The school is fully operated by the MSSB. The last of the Christian Brothers staff to teach at O'Connor retired at the end of June 1990.

Originally the main high school was built to hold 732 students and by the 1990s the student population almost doubled that figure. Additions to the school such as the "Taj" were made over the course of the school's history. By 1995, talks of building a new school on the property began. That project was protested by local residents until its approval sometime in the early 2000s. In 2002, the Toronto Catholic District School Board acquired the O'Connor House from the Christian Brothers. The old Lynch, O'Connor and Taj Mahal buildings were demolished and a large new modern two-storey 1020-pupil high school which opened in September 2005 is now in place.

The former address of the school was 5 Avonwick Gate; the current address of the new Senator O'Connor College School is changed to its present 60 Rowena Drive. The address change occurred because the entrance to the school was moved to the opposite end of the property that opens onto Rowena Drive. The new building, designed by Kearns Mancini Architects Inc., was partially built where the Lynch building previously stood as well as on the old athletic field.

== Administration ==
=== Principals ===
Principal	Previous School	Date started	Date finished	Notes
Brother Denis		1963	1973	Founding Principal of JJ Lynch, boys section.
Mother Cyril		1963	1965	Founding Principal of JJ Lynch, girls section.
Brother George Edwards		1963	1965	Founding Principal of Senator O'Connor
Tom King		1973	1982	Transferred to St. John Henry Newman in 1982.
Patrick Gravelle		1982	1989	
John Dean		1989	1991	
Stan Kutz		1992	1997	
John Dean		1997	2000	Second stint
Carmine Settino	St. Joan of Arc	2001	2005	Currently Principal at Chaminade
Susan Baker		2005	2013	Spent most of years as English and phys ed teacher. Became principal of the newly built school in 2005, retired after 8 long years. Also named one of Canada's Outstanding Principals by The Learning Partnership.
Michael O'Keefe (acting)		2009	2010	Served principal for a month
Paul McAlpine	Francis Libermann; St. John Paul II	2013	2015	
Tracey Parish	Francis Libermann; St. Patrick; A.P.P.L.E.	2015	2019	
Anyta Kyriakou	Neil McNeil	2019	2026	Formerly served as vice principal at this school from 2016 to 2019.
Linton Soares	Cardinal Carter Academy for the Arts	2026	Present	

== Notable alumni ==
- Isabel Bayrakdarian - soprano, Juno Award winner
- Ben Johnson - sprinter
- John Kawaja - World Champion curler
- Steve Konroyd - former NHL hockey player
- Elvira Kurt - stand-up comedian
- Maestro Fresh Wes - rapper/producer
- Todd McCarthy - politician, Member of Provincial Parliament for Durham
- Jennifer McKelvie (née Gray) - Deputy Mayor of Toronto & City Councillor
- Mark McKoy - Olympian (1992 Summer Olympics)
- Tim Micallef - sports broadcaster and radio host
- Tre Mission - rapper/producer
- Bill Morneau - Canada's Minister of Finance November 4, 2015 – August 17, 2020
- Larry Murphy - former professional ice hockey player
- Nasri - songwriter/producer, lead singer of MAGIC!
- Cindy Nicholas - marathon swimmer (Lake Ontario), former politician
- Natalia Popova - Ukrainian figure skater
- Harland Williams - stand-up comedian
- Kevin McKeown and Eric Owen - musicians of the band Black Pistol Fire

== See also ==
- Education in Ontario
- List of secondary schools in Ontario
