= The Pound Era =

1971 book by Hugh Kenner

- Author: Hugh Kenner
- Publisher: University of California Press
- Publication date: 1971

The Pound Era (ISBN 0520024273) is a book by Hugh Kenner, published in 1971. It is considered by many to be Kenner's masterpiece, and is generally seen as a seminal text on not only Ezra Pound but Modernism in general. As the title suggests, it places Ezra Pound at the center of the Modernist movement in literature and art during the early 20th century.

Kenner played an influential role in raising Ezra Pound's profile among critics and other readers of poetry. The Pound Era, the product of years of scholarship, was published in 1971. This work was responsible for enshrining Pound's reputation (damaged by his wartime activities) as one of the greatest Modernists.
