= Adaline Glasheen =

American scholar of the work of James Joyce

Adaline Erlbacher Glasheen (born 1920 in Evansville, Indiana – died 1993) was a Joyce scholar who specialised in the study of Finnegans Wake.

== Early life ==
Born Adaline Erlbacher in 1920 in Evansville, Indiana, her parents were Irene Tenney Jenner and Frederick Erlbacher. She attended public schools in Evansville and graduated from Central High School, where she eventually was honored as one of their most famous graduates. She attended Indiana University, transferring to the University of Mississippi where she received her BA in English. She later received her MA in English Literature when she began seminal work on Percy Bysshe Shelley.

== Personal life ==
While at the University of Mississippi she met Francis James Glasheen, whom she married in 1937. In 1946 her only child, Alison Elizabeth Glasheen Osborne was born. She also had three grandchildren and five great-grandchildren. She began her life's work on Finnegans Wake by James Joyce while raising her child.

== Life as an author and lecturer ==
Glasheen became part of an international group of Joyce scholars including Thornton Wilder, Hugh Kenner, Clive Hart, James Atherton, Richard Ellmann, and Louis Mink; who were devoted to the study of Finnegans Wake. Initially, she published numerous articles on Finnegans Wake culminating in the publication of A Census of Finnegans Wake by Faber and Faber of London. She also produced two further editions of her census. She attended numerous international Joyce Symposia and was in demand as a Joyce Lecturer at such universities as The Sorbonne in Paris and the University of Buffalo.

== Posthumous publications ==
Adaline Glasheen was a passionate letter writer. Two volumes of her correspondence have been published. A Tour of the Darkling Plain: The "Finnegans Wake" Letters of Thornton Wilder and Adaline Glasheen, ed. Edward M. Burns with Joshua A. Gaylord (University College Dublin Press, 2001) and A Passion for Joyce: The Letters of Hugh Kenner and Adaline Glasheen, ed. Edward M. Burns (University College Dublin Press, 2008).
