= Thomas A. Stewart Secondary School =

Location
- 1009 Armour Road North; Peterborough, Ontario, K9H 7H2; Canada; 44.329374°N 78.310204°W

Information
- School type: Public High School
- Motto: True to Self
- Founded: 1967
- School board: Kawartha Pine Ridge District School Board
- Superintendent: James Brake
- School number: 947563
- Principal: Debbie Callahan
- Grades: 9 to 12
- Enrollment: 1200 (2018)
- Language: English
- Area: 29 acres (120,000 m^{2}) bordering the Otonabee River
- Colours: Red, Blue and Silver
- Mascot: Griffin
- Website: www.kprschools.ca/tass/

Thomas A. Stewart Secondary School is a public secondary school located in Peterborough, Ontario, Canada. It was founded in 1967 and is located on 29 acres (120,000 m^{2}) bordering on the Otonabee River. It is a member of the Kawartha Pine Ridge District School Board.

== History ==
The school is named after Thomas Alexander Stewart (1786-1847). Thomas and his wife, Frances Browne Stewart (1794-1872), emigrated to Canada with their children and Thomas's brother-in-law and former business partner, Robert Reid, and his family. The party of 27 set sail from Belfast Lough on June 1, 1822. Seven weeks were spent on the ship before reaching Quebec. From Quebec they traveled to Kingston, and then on to York, where Stewart and Reid were each granted 1,200 acres (4.9 km^{2}), provided they settled in a township. Douro Township in Peterborough County was suggested as a promising region. On September 9, 1822, Stewart and Reid traveled to the area with surveyor Richard Birdsall, and each chose land on the Otonabee River. Thomas and Frances developed their home, "Auburn," on Lot 2, Concession XII, raising a family of 10 children to adulthood and assisting other settlers. Thomas Stewart became a prominent and influential citizen in the area until his death in 1847 from typhoid fever.

The school opened in 1967 as Thomas A. Stewart Secondary School and Auburn Vocational School. The vocational school later closed. The office for Auburn became the guidance office, the cafeteria became a dance studio, and the library became the head office for the Peterborough Regional Integrated Arts Program. The integrated arts program moved to Stewart in 2012 after the closing of Peterborough Collegiate Vocational School.

== Campus and facilities ==
The school is located on 29 acres (120,000 m^{2}) bordering on the Otonabee River. The building has a 219,238 sq. ft. of floor space containing 59 classrooms. The auditorium can hold 800 students. It was designed by architects Craig, Zeidler and Strong to house between 1200 and 1400 students comfortably, but has held in excess of 1600 students during the early 1980s.

=== Indoors ===
Its indoor facilities include:

- 3 art studios
- 2 music studios
- 2 drama studios
- foods lab
- 7 computer labs
- 6 science labs
- library
- 3 gymnasiums
- 8 technology classrooms
- cafeteria
- dance studio

=== Outdoors ===
Outdoors, the school boasts:

- track with turf football field
- 2 upper playing fields
- lower "island" playing field has 2 baseball diamonds
- 2 tennis courts
- 2 greenhouses
- boathouse with canoes
- Easy access to the Otonabee River

== Students ==
Students come from an equal mix of rural and urban homes. Students come from the communities of Ashburnham, Curve Lake First Nation, Douro, Keene, Otonabee, Emily, and Hiawatha First Nation on the shore of Rice Lake. Approximately 74% of students are bused to school.

== House system ==
A house system was established in 2004. There were originally 8 houses. This number was reduced to 4 houses at the beginning of the 2006-2007 school year. The house system was designed to create and encourage positive spirit at Thomas A. Stewart. The House program included activities in athletics, arts and academics. The house system was discontinued at the end of the 2008-2009 school year. However, the house system was re-established during the 2012-13 school year, following the integration with Peterborough Collegiate Vocational School. They adopted the new houses from Peterborough.

The four ex-Peterborough houses are:

- Warwick - Red
- Keswick - Blue
- Caernarvon - Yellow
- Wiggin - Green

The four original houses and their corresponding colours were:

- McCloy - Red
- Lennox - Green
- Moody - Yellow
- Connacher - Blue

== Peterborough Petes ==
High-school age members of the Peterborough Petes Major Junior A Hockey Club attend the school. Some notable former Petes include:

- Bob Gainey
- Tie Domi
- Steve Yzerman
- Chris Pronger
- Kris King
- Mike Ricci
- Luke Richardson
- Jody Hull
- Ron Tugnutt
- Kay Whitmore
- Dave Reid
- Jordan Staal
- Eric Staal
- Matt Puempel

== See also ==
- Education in Ontario
- List of secondary schools in Ontario
