= Brian Cherney =

Canadian composer

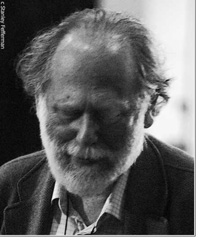
- Cherney in 2007
- Born: September 4, 1942 (age 83); Peterborough, Ontario
- Education: University of Toronto
- Occupations: Canadian composer, teacher, writer
- Writing career
- Notable awards: Jules Léger Prize, Order of Canada

Brian Cherney CM (born September 4, 1942) is a Canadian composer, teacher and writer.

Cherney was born in Peterborough, Ontario. He studied at the University of Toronto Faculty of Music where he was a pupil of John Weinzweig, Samuel Dolin, and John Beckwith. In 1972 he joined the Schulich School of Music at McGill University, where he has taught analysis and composition for over fifty years. His pieces, often characterized by carefully calculated formal trajectories and a rich harmonic language, give the impression of a quiet intensity, usually featuring "stillness" in some manner. Cherney was awarded the Jules Léger Prize for New Chamber Music in 1985 for River of Fire. His works have been played throughout North America, Europe, and elsewhere. His book, Harry Somers, remains one of the most important and detailed studies of this composer.

The Cherney portrait in the Canadian Composers Portraits series was released in 2005.

Illuminations: Essays in Honour of Brian Cherney, a special edition of the journal, Musical Intersections, was published in 2017.

Cherney was made a member of the Order of Canada in 2021.

He is the brother of oboist Lawrence Cherney.

== Works ==
Orchestra

- Variations for Orchestra (1967)
- Seven Images for Twenty Two Players (1971)
- Adieux (1980)
- In the Stillness Between (1982)
- Into the Distant Stillness (1984)
- Illuminations (1987)
- Transfiguration (1990)
- Et la solitude dérive au fil des fleuves... (1995)

Concertante

- Concerto for Violin and Orchestra (1963)
- Six Miniatures for Oboe and Strings (1968)
- Chamber Concerto for Viola and Ten Players (1975)
- Oboe Concerto (1989)
- Et j'entends la nuit qui chante dans les cloches (1990)

Instrumental ensemble

- Kontakion, Quiet Music for Eleven Players (1969)
- Apparitions (1991)
- In the Stillness of September 1942 (1992)
- Die Klingende Zeit (1993–1994)

Chamber music

- Sonata for violin and piano (1961)
- Quintet for saxophone and string quartet (1962)
- Woodwind Quintet (1965)
- Interlude and Variations for woodwind quintet (1965)
- String Quartet No.1 (1966)
- Six Miniatures for oboe and piano (1968)
- String Quartet No.2 (1970)
- Notturno for piano and woodwind quintet (1974)
- String Trio (1976)
- Group Portrait – With Piano for piano and woodwind quintet (1978)
- Beyond the Seventh Palace for viola and percussion (1982)
- Accord for accordion, oboe and cello (1985)
- Triolet for flute, harp and bassoon (1980)
- Playing for Time for oboe, percussion and piano (1981)
- Gan Eden for violin and piano (1983)
- River of Fire for oboe d'amore and harp (1983)
- String Quartet No.3 (1985)
- In Stillness Ascending for viola and piano (1986)
- In the Stillness of the Summer Wind for oboe and string quartet (1987)
- Trois petites pièces désséchées... En forme de sandwich for viola and piano (1979)
- Le fil d'ariane for guitar and percussion (1988)
- Dunkle Stimmen... Am Rande der Nacht for violin, cello and contrabass (1988)
- Dopplegänger for two flutes (1991)
- Like Ghosts from an Enchanter Fleeing for cello and piano (1993)
- String Quartet No.4 (1994)
- In the Great Museum of our Memory for bass oboe and bass clarinet (1994)
- Echoes in the Memory for clarinet, cello and piano (1997)
- Entendre marcher un ange... for flute and percussion (1998)
- Qui entendrait le cri d'un ange dans les ténèbres? for clarinet, ondes Martenot and cello (1998)
- Music for a Summer Wedding for flute, viola and harp (2000–2002)
- String Quartet No. 6 (2009)
- In Time's Wake for oboe and Piano (2013)
- 22 Arguments for the Suspense of Disbelief for flute, cello and Piano (2013)

Music for instrumental solo

- Mobile II for cello (1968)
- Mobile IIIa for oboe (1970)
- Tangents I for cello (1975)
- Tangents II for oboe (1976)
- Seven Miniatures in the Form of a Mobile for viola (1978)
- Études for oboe (1979)
- Gothic Scenes and Interludes for organ (1983–1987)
- Epitaph for English horn (1986)
- Déploration for harpsichord (1988)
- Shekhinah for viola (1988)
- Doppelgänger, version for flute solo (1992)
- In the Stillness of Eden for violin (1992)
- Le dernier cri for trumpet (1992)
- The Return of Ulysses for alto saxophone (1992)
- Music for a Solitary Cellist for cello (1993)
- In the Great Museum of our Memory for bass oboe (1994)
- Jam for Frances for trombone (1997)
- Incantation for flute (1999)
- Quelques pensées sur le 300e anniversaire du voloncelle Carlo Tonini d'Antonio Lysy... for cello (2003)
- Capriccio for Solo Cello for cello (2011)

Piano

- Six Miniatures (1965)
- Sonata (1966)
- Jest (1967)
- Intervalls, Patterns, Shapes (1968)
- Pieces for Young Pianists (3 volumes) (1968)
- Dans le crépuscule de souvenir, 5 pieces (1977–1980)
- In the Stillness of the Seventh Autumn (1983)
- Quelques fois, à l'ombre de la nuit... au lointain... (1991–1992)
- Tombeau, 7 pieces (1996)

Vocal music

- Two Songs for soprano and chamber orchestra (1963)
- Mobile IV, text by Tu Fu, for soprano and chamber ensemble (1969)
- Eclipse, text by Brian Hendersen, for soprano and chamber ensemble (1972)
- Tenebrae, for choir (2002)
- Hannah's Prayer, for choir (2004)
- Die Niemandrose, for choir (2006)
- Three Songs to Texts by Paul Celan, for soprano and piano (2007)
- An Unfinished Life, for narrator, choir, and chamber orchestra (2007)
- Sérénade triste, for choir (2012)

== See also ==
- Music of Canada
- List of Canadian composers
