= Kenner Collegiate Vocational Institute =

- Coat Of Arms

Location
- 633 Monaghan Road; Peterborough, Ontario, K9J 5J2; Canada; 44.278392°N 78.327°W

Information
- School type: Public High School
- Motto: OMNIA PER LABORUM (Success Through Work)
- Founded: 1952
- School board: Kawartha Pine Ridge District School Board
- Superintendent: Joe Tompkins
- School number: 919195
- Principal: Dexroy Haughton
- Grades: 9 to 12
- Enrollment: 506 (2019)
- Language: English and Core French
- Schedule type: Semestered
- Schedule: 8:35 am - 2:40 pm
- Area: COSSA (Kawartha)
- Colours: Blue and Gold
- Mascot: Rammy The Ram
- Team name: Kenner Rams
- Accreditation: Ontario Secondary School Diploma, International Baccalaureate Diploma
- Newspaper: The Kenner Chronicle
- Yearbook: ACTA
- Feeder schools: Kenner Collegiate Intermediate School, Prince of Wales Elementary School
- Website: kenner.kprdsb.ca

Kenner Collegiate Vocational Institute (Kenner CVI) is the oldest operating public high school in Peterborough, Ontario, Canada. It opened in 1952 and was an accredited International Baccalaureate School until 2026. It is named after Peterborough Collegiate Institute's quinquagenary teacher and principal Dr. H.R.H. Kenner, father of literary scholar Hugh Kenner.

== Courses ==
It offers a wide range of programs including the International Baccalaureate Program and Learning, Life Skills Program, Peer Reading Tutor program, Cooperative Education, Technological Education, and Arts Education. In addition, Kenner CVI offers Specialist High Skills Majors in Construction, Hospitality, Horticulture, and Transportation under the supervision of the Ministry of Education for the Province of Ontario.

== Campus ==
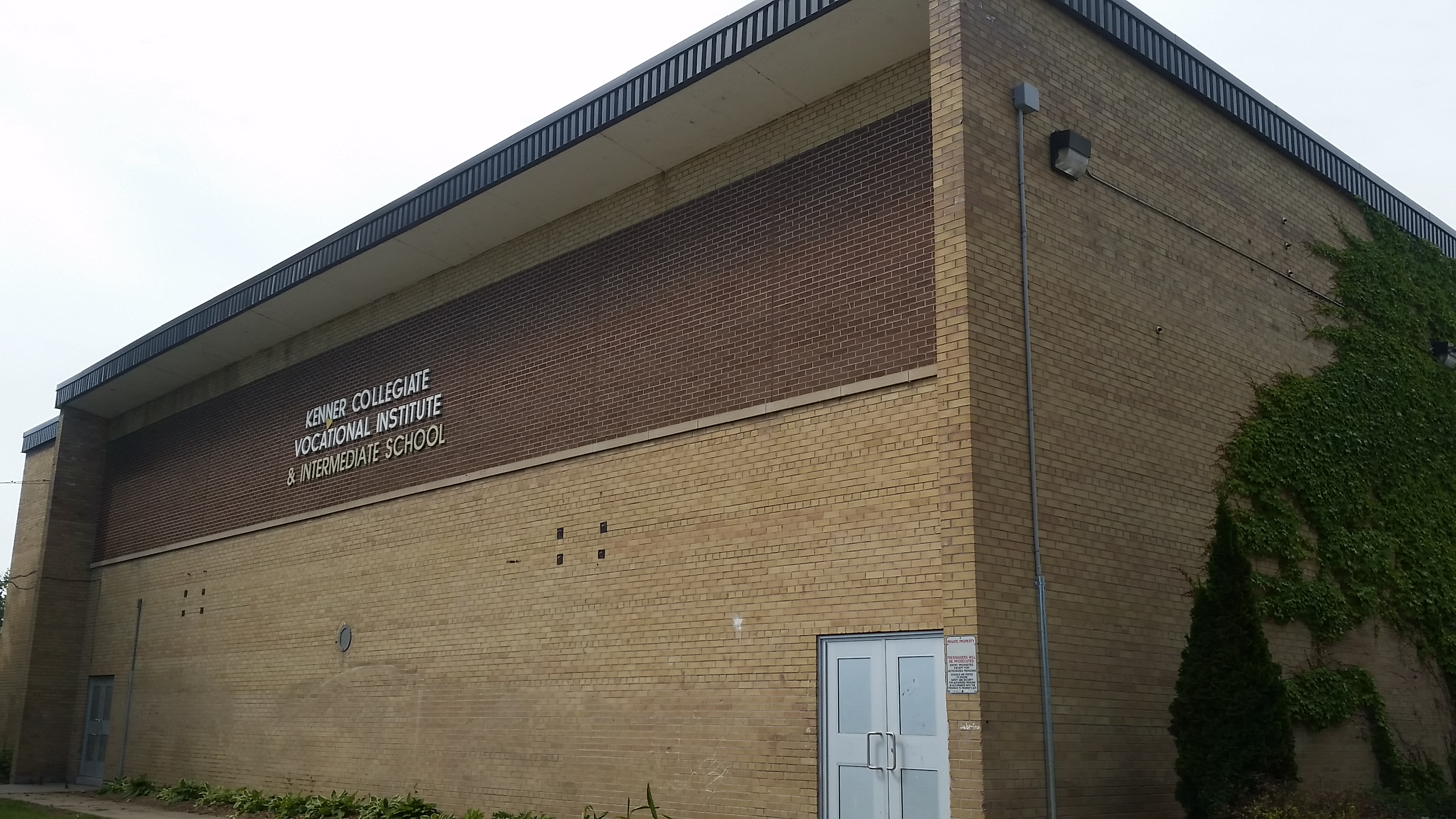
The front of Kenner Collegiate's main gym exterior.

The Kenner CVI campus facility consists of 200,000 square feet (20,000 m^{2}) covering 7.13 hectares. The school is wheelchair accessible with one elevator and ramps. One section of the school is designated for the Intermediate Division.

The indoor facility contains a hairstyling studio, greenhouse, industrial kitchen, weight and fitness rooms, and technical (computer, welding, automotive, and carpentry) shops.

=== Architecture ===
Kenner Collegiate was built by Eastwood Construction in 1952 with a small gym nicknamed the "broom closet" and a two-story building containing approximately 16 classrooms. In 1957, another 16 classroom wing, including a sewing room, two laboratories, and a smaller gym attached to the north wing on the south side of the school was constructed. The cafeteria was upgraded and the woodworking and machine shops were added and fully functional. At this time, Kenner was seen to have transitioned to its high school status, rather than an intermediate school.

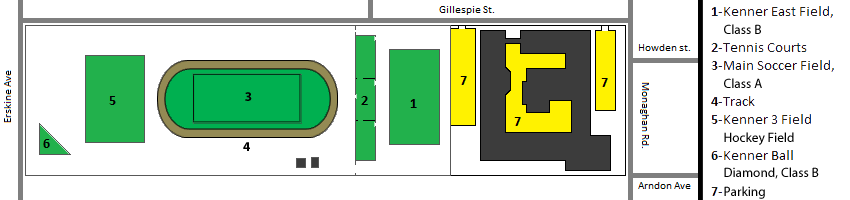
Map of the Kenner Collegiate Campus. The playing fields are owned and maintained by the City of Peterborough and the school buildings and parking areas are owned and operated by the Kawartha Pine Ridge District School Board.

The south wing and the main gym, that could also function as an auditorium, was built in 1966 and 1967. The south wing at the time was only one story, unlike all the other wings, which were two.

The final main attachment of the school was built in 1972 and consisted of an auditorium, library, and more classrooms. It was also the area of the commercial classes. In all, the new west wing added a commercial shop, enlarged shops, a second story to the south wing, a library, and an auditorium. This expansion nearly doubled the schools size to accommodate the increasing number of students enrolling at Kenner.

In more recent years no new major attachments to the school have been made, except for the many upgrades done within the school. In 2016 Kenner`s library was upgraded to become the Learning Commons complete with personal electronics charging stations, a living room and cafe area, conference rooms and computer labs.

Timetable of Construction	Date
Original school construction of the Monaghan Wing is completed	1952
Gillespe Wing with a small gym is built	1957
The Kenner Playing Field is designed and developed	1959
Electrical Shop is constructed	1962
School wide Fire Alarm System is originally installed	1963
Main gym (and auditorium) is built with the South Wing of classrooms	1966
West wing addition is built including more classrooms, the library and a fully operational auditorium	1972
Library conversion to the Learning Commons renovation	2016

== The Kenner Foundation ==
The Kenner Foundation Logo.

In 1993, the funds raised from the alumni reunion of the previous year (the 40th annual) amounting to over 20 000 dollars were used as the initial funding for an organization subsequently named the Kenner Foundation. This foundation's purpose is to provide financial support to students continuing their education in post-secondary programs, in the form of scholarships and bursaries. The primary aim of the Foundation is to propel Kenner Alumni into successful careers in leadership roles. The funding for the Kenner foundation comes from a combination of funds raised at school-based events and reunions, and donations from members of the public and corporate sponsors alike. Since its inception in 1993, the Foundation has provided Kenner Alumni with over 175 000 dollars in scholarships and bursaries into their further education.

=== The Kenner Hall Of Honour ===
The Hall of Honour is a commemorative section of the school's front hallway dedicated to housing the portraits and brief biographies of individuals who have been inducted over the past sixty years since the Hall's inception, and who are deemed worthy of the award by the governing committee of The Kenner Foundation. The portraits hang year round and can be seen by any visitor, member of the staff or student body. In order for an individual to qualify for indoctrination, several criteria must be met for consideration. They must have attended Kenner Collegiate for at least three years, one of these years being their graduation year, implying they are official Kenner Alumni. They must have graduated no less than fifteen years prior to their nomination, and they must be deemed a successful example of a Kenner graduate, serving as a role-model for the current student body, either in their workplace or in their community. In addition, whoever nominates an individual must provide a brief written summary of why their nominee is deserving of the position in the Hall of Honour.

== Student governance ==
From 1952 to 1954, the Students’ Committee was the unofficial Students’ Council, consisting of school club presidents. These members organized and improved school activities along with raising money for desired equipment. In the spring of 1956, Student Council elections were held. The council consisted of a president, vice-president, councillors, secretary, treasurer and teacher advisors. The purpose of student council was to govern and lead the student body.

In 1961-62, a Student Parliament was implemented. Parliament included a Prime Minister, a leader of the opposition and representatives of the parties. Juniors could elect one member and seniors could elect two. In 1962-63, the Kenner Students’ Association (KSA) was introduced, consisting of both the Student Parliament and the Students’ Council. Parliament met biweekly to discuss expenses and matters that applied to the student body. The Students’ Council was the executive branch of KSA consisting of ten members. In the late sixties, the Student Parliament system was removed. Alternatively, class representatives, Boys Athletic Association (BAA) and Girls Athletic Association (GAA) representatives met with the Students’ Council to discuss matters that applied to the student body.

In 1969, the house system was implemented at Kenner CVI. In 1974-75, representatives from each school activity and representatives from each of the four houses at Kenner CVI were given a seat on the Students’ Council. In 1975-76, council members were chosen by submitted applications which replaced the previously used open election process. The house system was discontinued at Kenner CVI after the 1988-89 school year.

In 1989-90, the Students’ Council was simplified to a president, a vice-president, a secretary, a treasurer and councillors. The president and the vice-president were chosen through an open election. This process has remained the same to this day. The other members of council were chosen through submitted applications. The Students’ Council was eventually renamed the Students’ Activity Council.

The Students’ Activity Council evolved into the Student Government in the 2015-16 school year. The Student Government system provides further leadership opportunities for students beyond the president and vice-president roles. The Student Government includes a president, a vice president, a secretary, a treasurer, and grade representatives. The Student Government also includes a representative from all four of the newly implemented Student Government Committees. The Student Government meets every Thursday.

As of 2019, the Students' Activity Council, usually referred to as Student Council is composed of any students who show up to the weekly meetings. The Students' Government, more commonly called Student Government, is composed of the President and Vice President, who are voted on by the entire school, eight grade representatives (two from each grade), two sports representatives (one male and one female), one design representative, one financial representative, and one secretary. All positions in the Student Government are elected solely by the members of the Student Activity Council after submitting a written application, with the exception of the President and Vice President.

== Notable alumni ==
- Steve Larmer, former professional hockey player
- Jeff Leal, Member of Provincial Parliament and Minister of Agriculture and Rural Affairs
- Bobby Roode, professional wrestler
- Gary Stewart, Member of Provincial Parliament
- Peter Wildman, actor
- Mickey Redmond, former professional hockey player
- Education in Ontario
- List of secondary schools in Ontario
