= Peter Demos =

American physicist

Peter T. Demos
- Born: July 18, 1918; Peterborough, Ontario, Canada
- Died: September 18, 2012 (aged 94); Belmont, Massachusetts
- Education: Queen's University, MIT
- Spouse: Elizabeth "Betty" Demos
- Scientific career
- Workplaces: Massachusetts Institute of Technology
- Thesis: Design and Properties of the Massachusetts Institute of Technology Linear Electron Accelerator
- Doctoral advisor: Arthur F. Kip; John C. Slater

Peter T. Demos (July 18, 1918 – September 18, 2012) was a professor in the Department of Physics and the Laboratory for Nuclear Science at MIT. A native of Peterborough, Ontario, Demos attended Peterborough Collegiate and Vocational School and Queen's University, and received a Ph.D. in Physics from MIT in 1951. He was a founder and former director of the Bates Linear Accelerator at MIT and served as advisor on nuclear science to John F. Kennedy.

== Work ==
- Demos, Peter T. (1951). Design and Properties of the Massachusetts Institute of Technology Linear Electron Accelerator (Ph.D. thesis). Massachusetts Institute of Technology.
- Demos, P. T.; Kip, A. F.; Slater, J. C. (1952). "The M.I.T. Linear Electron Accelerator". Journal of Applied Physics. 23 (1): 53–65. Bibcode:1952JAP....23...53D. doi:10.1063/1.1701978.
- Dow, K.; et al. (1988). "Longitudinal Response Functions and Sum Rules for Quasielastic Electron Scattering from ^{3}H and ^{3}He". Phys. Rev. Lett. 61 (15): 1706–1709. Bibcode:1988PhRvL..61.1706D. doi:10.1103/PhysRevLett.61.1706. PMID 10038875.
- US 3845734, Demos, Peter T., "Apparent wind indicator adapted to establish optimum wind direction relative to the sail of a sailboat", issued 5 November 1974
- Demos, Peter (9 October 2012). "Nuclear physicist Peter T. Demos dies at 94". MIT News Office. Sarah H. Wright.
