= Fannie May =

American chocolate manufacturer

Fannie May Confection Brands, Inc.
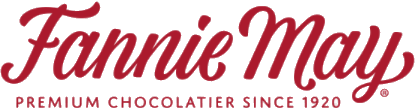
- Type: Subsidiary
- Industry: Food
- Founded: 1920; 106 years ago in Chicago, Illinois, U.S.
- Founder: H. Teller Archibald
- Products: Chocolate bars, bonbons
- Parent: Ferrero SpA (2017–)
- Website: fanniemay.com

Fannie May Confection Brands, Inc. is an American chocolate manufacturer headquartered in Chicago and currently owned by multinational company Ferrero SpA. Fannie May manufactures a broad variety of products including enrobed, barks, caramels, squares, berries, twist wrapped, molded, flow wrapped, and boxed chocolates. Fannie May produces various candies without gluten, milk, honey, oils, wheat or eggs for those with the relevant allergies. The Union of Orthodox Jewish Congregations of America certified many of Fannie May's products to be kosher.

== History ==
The first Fannie May shop was opened in 1920 by Henry Teller Archibald at 11 North LaSalle Street in Chicago, selling buttercream candies.

The Second World War made some of the ingredients in Fannie May's recipes hard to come by. However, they did not change their recipes, or change the candies' quality.

In the mid-1980s, the company opened its first store in Missouri. By the end of the decade, more than 250 locations were in operation, mostly in the Midwest. In 1992, the Archibald Candy Company expanded its business by acquiring chocolatier Fanny Farmer and its 200 retail stores in the northeastern United States as a sister brand to Fannie May.

The acquisition proved too much for Archibald, which filed for bankruptcy and closed more than 200 of its retail stores. An errant path of merger and acquisitions, whereby the company had become the largest chain of candy retailers in the country but without adequate financing and a viable corporate strategy, was blamed for the bankruptcy.

In 2004, Alpine Confections purchased Archibald out of receivership, merged Fanny Farmer into Fannie May, and moved production to its own Green, Ohio-based Harry London Candies, which had been acquired a year earlier. Fannie May was reopened in October 2004 with 45 retail outlets.

In April 2006, Fannie May was sold for $85 million plus an earnout to publicly traded Internet retailer 1-800-Flowers.com. The chocolates and candy continued to be manufactured in Ohio under the name Fannie May Confections Brands Inc, while the Fannie May corporate headquarters remained in Chicago.

In March 2017, the Italian confectionery giant Ferrero SpA bought Fannie May and Harry London from 1-800-Flowers.com, for $115 million. At the time, Ferrero indicated that it hoped to expand Fannie May beyond its currently regional market.

== Products ==
- 1920 Buttercreams are introduced.
- 1946 The Pixie, the company's most popular candy to date, is introduced.
- 1963 The Mint Meltaway, a combination of dark chocolate and peppermint coated with chocolate or a green pastel confection, is introduced.
- 1972 The Trinidad, a dark truffle center enrobed in white confection and toasted coconut, is introduced.
- 1992 The Carmarsh, a combination of caramel, marshmallow, and chocolate, is introduced.
