= Melissa Hui =

Canadian composer (born 1966)

- Born: 22 April 1966 (age 58); Hong Kong
- Genres: contemporary classical
- Occupation: Composer
- Website: sites.google.com/view/melissahui/home

Melissa Hui is a Chinese-Canadian composer and pianist. She was born in 1966 in Hong Kong and currently resides in Montreal where she has been a faculty member at McGill University since 2010. Notable works by this artist include and blue sparks burn(2002) for violin and piano, Common Ground (1993) for orchestra, and San Rocco (1991) for oboe d'amore, SATB chamber choir, and chimes.

== Biography ==
=== Early life and education ===
Hui was born in the year 1966 in British Hong Kong (Now Hong Kong, China). In 1974, at the age of eight years old, she immigrated to Canada where she was raised from then on in Vancouver, British Columbia. Hui's college education began at the University of British Columbia, where she earned her undergraduate degree in piano performance. For her graduate studies, Hui pursued and earned both her master's and doctoral degrees in composition from the California Institute of the Arts and Yale University, respectively. Mentors to Hui during her collegiate studies in composition are noted as Jacob Druckman, Mel Powell, Martin Bresnick, Earl Kim, and Morton Subotnick.

=== Career ===
In 1993, Hui worked with a small group of composers in collaboration with an eleven-member instrumental ensemble to found the Common Sense Composer's Collective. This organization was founded with a common interest in challenging the way music had been created and shared up until that point in time. Its founding members went on to collaborate with ten more ensembles between their first project and the year 2017. From 1994 to 2004, Hui served as a faculty member at Stanford University before moving back to Canada. In 2010, Hui joined the Schulich School of Music at McGill University in Quebec as associate professor of composition, where she has remained employed to this day.

== Music ==
Aside from her extensive list of chamber music compositions, Hui has also written a number of orchestral and choral works for larger ensembles. Notable orchestral works include Between You (1992), Common Ground (1993), and Aljira (1995) commissioned by the Vancouver, Winnipeg, and Oregon Symphonies, respectively. Among some of Hui's few larger-scale choral pieces are San Rocco (1991), Night on Earth (2001), and the more recent Pax (2019), all of which include non-vocal instrumental parts in addition to the foundational SATB parts in their scoring.

Among the other memorable works from Hui's collection of chamber music compositions is and blue sparks burn (2002) for violin and piano. Commissioned by the Music Teacher's Association of California's program, "Friends of Today's Music", this piece is noted by Hui herself as a commentary from her point of view on the tragic events of September 11, 2001.

Speaking in Tongues(1993) and Foreign Affairs(1994) are two more of Hui's chamber works that are both notable in that they call for a larger ensemble of fifteen parts in their instrumentation. These two works were followed by Lacrymosa (1996), which calls for a soprano vocalist in its scoring, and Woman: Songs on poems by Sandra Cisneros (1997), featuring a mezzo-soprano among the flute, viola, and cello parts. As the name of the latter work implies, this piece is set to the words of a handful of Sandra Cisneros’ poems, including "Loose Woman", which, in an effort to evoke a bold sense of femininity, Hui set to music inspired by a burlesque dance scene from the Broadway musical, “Sweet Charity”. Additionally, in 1998 Melissa Hui wrote the score to the Oscar-nominated short film, "Sunrise Over Tiananmen Square", which was directed by Shui-Bo Wang.

== Works ==
Year	Title	Instrumentation
1988	Shadow play	flute, oboe, clarinet, bassoon, horn, chamber orchestra
	Three songs on poems by Longfellow	solo voice with keyboard
1989	Tempered glass	flute, clarinet, violin, cello, piano and percussion
	Beyond the moment	cello
1990	Two sides to the wind	trumpet, full orchestra
	Absolut cd #1: New Music Canada	variable ensemble
	Changes	flute, oboe, clarinet, violin, cello, double bass, piano and percussion
1991	San Rocco	mixed chorus, percussion, oboe
	One voice for flute	flute
1992	Between you	full orchestra, flute, oboe, clarinet, bassoon, horn, trumpet, trombone, tuba, timpani, percussion, piano
1993	Speaking in tongues: Nine miniatures for fifteen instruments	chamber orchestra, flute, oboe, clarinet, bassoon, trumpet, horn, trombone, percussion, piano, violin, viola, cello, double bass
1994	Foreign affairs	flute, oboe, clarinet, bassoon, horn, trumpet, trombone, harp, violin, viola, cello, double bass, chamber orchestra
	Solstice	piano, percussion, piccolo, English horn, oboe
1995	Aljira	full orchestra
	Inner voices	full orchestra, flute, oboe, clarinet, bassoon, horn, trumpet, trombone, tuba, timpani, percussion
1996	As I lie still	piano, percussion
	Lacrymosa	solo voice with chamber ensemble, woodwinds, keyboards
1997	From dusk to dawn	chamber orchestra, piano, percussion, flute, oboe, clarinet, violin, viola, cello, double bass, harp
1998	Sunrise Over Tiananmen Square	
1999	In the breath of night	string orchestra
2000	Come as you are	flute, clarinet, trumpet, horn, trombone, percussion, violin, viola, pipa, chamber orchestra
	When soft voices die	solo piano
2001	Night on Earth	English horn, mixed chorus, other percussion
2002	and blue sparks burn	violin and piano
2008	Pimooteewin	soprano, tenor, narrator/actor, mixed chorus, flute, oboe, percussion, violin, viola, cello, double-bass
