= Lawrence Cherney =

Canadian oboist

Lawrence Cherney, CM (born May 1, 1946) is a Canadian oboist and the current Artistic Director of Soundstreams Canada. A proponent of new music in Canada, Cherney commissioned more than 30 new works for oboe during his career. He is a charter member of the National Arts Centre Orchestra and a founding member of the York Winds.

Born in Peterborough, Ontario, Cherney is the brother of composer Brian Cherney. From 1959 to 1964 he studied at The Royal Conservatory of Music with Perry Bauman. In 1964 he matriculated to the University of Toronto where he earned a Bachelor of Arts in philosophy in 1969. During that time he continued to study music with Bauman. In 1966 he was awarded a grant from the Ford Foundation which enabled him to pursue music studies in the United States. Further grants from the Canada Council allowed him to continue these studies through 1970 with such teachers as John Mack and Ray Still.

== Sources ==
- The Canadian Encyclopedia Entry for Lawrence Cherney
