= Fanny Farmer =

American candy manufacturer and retailer

Fanny Farmer was an American candy manufacturer and retailer.

Fanny Farmer was started in Rochester, New York, by Canadian politician and businessman Frank O'Connor in 1919, and grew to over 400 stores before being bought and consolidated.

== History ==
=== 20th century ===
O'Connor had previously started the Laura Secord Candy Shops in Toronto, Ontario, in 1913. The company was named "Fanny Farmer" to exploit the exemplary reputation of one of America's foremost culinary experts, Fannie Farmer, who had died four years earlier; the company did not use her recipes, and she had nothing to do with the candy stores. The spelling of the first name was altered simply to "avoid confusion".

Fanny Farmer stores shared a look that was similar to that of Chicago candy maker Fannie May.

John D. Hayes was president of the company for many years, from its earliest years through the 1950s. He was a shrewd businessman, and guided the company through some difficult times. During the Depression, candy sales were dropping until he slashed retail prices, and kept the company in business. During World War II, he self-imposed rationing on company stores in the US, to ensure adequate supplies of candy for the armed forces overseas. He was named 1955 "Candy Man of the Year" by the candy industry. He was also blind.

In 1962, a proxy fight allowed a group of stock market investors from New York City & New England, without experience in the candy industry, to gain control of the Fanny Farmer company. They pushed for continuous expansion of the company, spending heavily to open more retail stores, despite facing increasing retail competition. This rapid expansion financially stressed the company.

In 1992, the Archibald Candy Company acquired Fanny Farmer and its 200 retail stores in the Northeastern United States as a sister brand to its own Fannie May candies sold primarily in the Midwest and mid-Atlantic United States.

=== 21st century ===
An errant path of merger and acquisitions, whereby Archibald became the largest chain of candy retailers in the country but without adequate financing and a viable corporate strategy, resulted in two bankruptcies, in 2002 and 2004.

In 2004, Alpine Confections purchased Archibald out of receivership, merged Fanny Farmer into Fannie May, and moved production to its own Green, Ohio-based Harry London Candies, which had been acquired a year earlier. Fannie Mae was reopened in October 2004 with 45 retail outlets.

In April 2006, Fannie May was sold for $85 million plus an earnout to publicly traded Internet retailer 1-800-Flowers.com. The chocolates and candy continued to be manufactured in Ohio under the name Fannie May Confections Brands Inc, while the Fanny May corporate headquarters remained in Chicago.

In March 2017, Fannie May and Harry London were sold by 1-800-Flowers to Ferrero SpA for $115 million.
