= Hugh Kenner =

Canadian literary scholar, critic and professor

- Born: January 7, 1923; Peterborough, Ontario, Canada
- Died: November 24, 2003 (aged 80); Athens, Georgia, U.S.

Academic background
- Influences: Marshall McLuhan

Academic work
- Discipline: Literary criticism
- Main interests: Modernist literature
- Notable works: The Pound Era (1971)

William Hugh Kenner (January 7, 1923 – November 24, 2003) was a Canadian literary scholar, critic and professor. His studies on Modernist literature often analyzed the work of James Joyce, Ezra Pound, and Samuel Beckett. His major study of the period, The Pound Era, argued for Pound as the central figure of Modernism, and is considered one of the most important works on the topic.

== Biography ==
=== Early years and education ===
Kenner was born in Peterborough, Ontario, on January 7, 1923. His father H. R. H. Kenner taught classics and his mother Mary (Williams) Kenner taught French and German at Peterborough Collegiate Institute. Kenner attributed his interest in literature to his poor hearing, caused by a bout of influenza during his childhood.

Attending the University of Toronto, Kenner studied under Marshall McLuhan, who wrote the introduction to Kenner's first book Paradox in Chesterton, about G. K. Chesterton's works. Kenner's second book, The Poetry of Ezra Pound (1951) was dedicated to McLuhan, who had introduced Kenner to Pound on June 4, 1948, during Pound's incarceration at St. Elizabeths Hospital, Washington, DC, where Kenner and McLuhan had driven as a detour from their trip from Toronto to New Haven, Connecticut. (Pound, who became a friend of Kenner's, had suggested the book be titled The Rose in the Steel Dust.) Later, Kenner said of McLuhan, "I had the advantage of being exposed to Marshall when he was at his most creative, and then of getting to the far end of the continent shortly afterward, when he couldn't get me on the phone all the time. He could be awfully controlling." Later, when McLuhan wrote that the development of cartography during the Renaissance created a geographical sense that had never previously existed, Kenner sent him a postcard reading in full: "Gallia est omnis divisa in partes tres, Yours, Hugh."

In 1950, Kenner earned a PhD from Yale University, with a dissertation on James Joyce, written under the supervision of Cleanth Brooks. This work, which won the John Addison Porter Prize at Yale, became Dublin's Joyce in 1956.

=== Academic career ===
Kenner's first teaching post was at the University of California, Santa Barbara (1951 to 1973); he then taught at Johns Hopkins University (from 1973 to 1990) and the University of Georgia (from 1990 to 1999).

Kenner played an influential role in raising Ezra Pound's profile among critics and other readers of poetry. The publication of The Poetry of Ezra Pound in 1951 "was the beginning, and the catalyst, for a change in attitude toward Pound on the American literary and educational scenes." The Pound Era, the product of years of scholarship and considered by many to be Kenner's masterpiece, was published in 1971. This work was responsible for enshrining Pound's reputation (damaged by his wartime sympathy for fascism) as one of the greatest Modernists.

Though best known for his work on modernist literature, Kenner's range of interests was wide. His books include an appreciation of Chuck Jones, an introduction to geodesic math, and a user's guide for the Heathkit H100/Zenith Z-100 computer; a Kenner review of Lucidata Pascal for HDOS contains both an anecdote from when he lectured on Joyce at ETH Zurich, and the source code of a word count utility he wrote in the language. In his later years he was a columnist for both Art & Antiques and Byte magazine. Kenner was a friend of William F. Buckley Jr., to whom Kenner introduced word processing, and a contributor to National Review. He also shared a close correspondence with Guy Davenport, the noted scholar, fiction writer, and artist.

=== Personal life ===
Kenner was married twice: his first wife, Mary Waite, died in 1964; the couple had three daughters and two sons. His second wife, whom he married in 1965, was Mary-Anne Bittner; they had a son and a daughter.

Electronics was a longtime hobby for Kenner, who built his first Heathkit in 1955.

Kenner died at his home in Athens, Georgia, on November 24, 2003.

== Selected bibliography ==
- Paradox in Chesterton (1947)
- The Poetry of Ezra Pound (New Directions, 1951)
- Wyndham Lewis: A Critical Guidebook (1954)
- Dublin's Joyce (Indiana University Press, 1956; rpt., Columbia University Press, 1987)
- Gnomon: Essays in Contemporary Literature (1959)
- The Art of Poetry (1959)
- The Invisible Poet: T. S. Eliot (1959; rev. ed, 1969)
- Samuel Beckett: A Critical Study (Grove Press, 1961; rev. ed., 1968)
- T. S. Eliot: A Collection of Critical Essays (editor) (Prentice-Hall, 1962)
- The Stoic Comedians: Flaubert, Joyce, and Beckett (1962) (illustrated by Guy Davenport)
- Seventeenth Century Poetry: The Schools of Donne & Jonson (editor) (1964)
- Studies in Change: A Book of the Short Story (editor) (1965)
- The Counterfeiters: An Historical Comedy (Indiana University Press, 1968; The Johns Hopkins University Press, 1985) (illustrated by Guy Davenport)
- The Pound Era (University of California Press, 1971)
- Bucky: A Guided Tour of Buckminster Fuller (William Morrow, 1973)
- A Reader's Guide to Samuel Beckett (Farrar, Straus & Giroux, 1973)
- A Homemade World: The American Modernist Writers (Alfred A. Knopf, 1975)
- Geodesic Math and How to Use It (1976)
- Joyce's Voices (University of California Press, 1978)
- Ulysses (George Allen & Unwin, 1980; rev. ed., The Johns Hopkins University Press, 1987)
- A Colder Eye: The Modern Irish Writers (Alfred A. Knopf, 1983)
- The Mechanic Muse (Oxford University Press, 1987)
- A Sinking Island: The Modern English Writers (1988)
- Mazes: Essays (North Point Press, 1989)
- Historical Fictions: Essays (University of Georgia Press, 1995)
- Chuck Jones: A Flurry of Drawings (1994)
- The Elsewhere Community, CBC Massey Lectures (1998)
- A Passion for Joyce: The Letters of Hugh Kenner and Adaline Glasheen ed. Edward M. Burns (University College Dublin Press, 2008)
- Questioning Minds: The Letters of Guy Davenport and Hugh Kenner, ed. Edward M. Burns (Counterpoint Press, 2018)
