= Laura Secord Chocolates =

Canadian chocolate and candy company

Laura Secord s.e.c
- Trade name: Laura Secord
- Type: Private
- Industry: Food
- Founded: 1913; 113 years ago
- Founder: Frank Patrick O'Connor
- Headquarters: Mississauga, Ontario, Canada
- Products: Chocolate
- Website: laurasecord.ca

Laura Secord s.e.c is a Canadian chocolatier, confectionery, and ice cream company. It is owned by Jean Leclerc of Quebec City, who owns Nutriart, a company devoted to chocolate production. Nutriart is a former division of Biscuits Leclerc.

== History ==
=== Founding ===
The company was founded in 1913 by Frank P. O'Connor with its first store on Yonge Street in Toronto, Ontario. He chose the name to honour the Canadian heroine Laura Secord. In 1813, Secord, pioneer wife and mother of seven children, made a journey to warn Lieutenant James FitzGibbon of a planned American attack, contributing to British victory at the Battle of Beaver Dams.

=== Ownership changes ===
In 1969, Laura Secord was sold by the O'Connor family to John Labatt Limited. In 1983 it was acquired by British-owned Rowntree Mackintosh Confectionery of York, England. Its successor, Nestlé's Canadian unit, sold it in 1998 to Archibald Candy Corporation of Chicago, which they then sold to Gordon Brothers LLC of Boston in 2004. In 2004, there were 174 outlets throughout the country and a staff of 1,600.

In 2010 Jean and Jacques Leclerc of Quebec purchased the company. As of 2023, the Leclercs still own the business, which has been reduced to 100 retail outlets offering some 400 products. It has offices in Mississauga, Ontario, and Quebec City, Quebec, and offers online purchase and shipping to Canada and the U.S.
