= Frank Patrick O'Connor =

Canadian politician

The Honourable Frank Patrick O'Connor
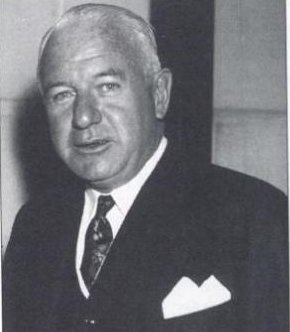

Canadian Senator from Ontario
- In office December 6, 1935 – August 21, 1939
- Appointed by: William Lyon Mackenzie King

Personal details
- Born: April 9, 1885 Deseronto, Ontario, Canada
- Died: August 21, 1939 (aged 54) Toronto, Ontario, Canada
- Party: Liberal
- Spouse: Mary Ellen Hayes 1912–1931
- Relations: Mary Eleanor McKeown and Patrick O'Connor (parents)
- Occupation: Politician; businessman

Frank Patrick O'Connor (April 9, 1885 – August 21, 1939) was a Canadian politician, businessman and philanthropist. He was the founder of Laura Secord Chocolates in Canada and Fanny Farmer in the United States. He is the namesake behind O'Connor Drive in Toronto.

== Early years ==
O'Connor was born in Deseronto, Ontario, the son of Mary Eleanor McKeown and Patrick O'Connor. He quit school at the age of 14 and started working at Canadian General Electric in Peterborough. Around 1910 he opened The Canadian Chicle Co. at 283 George Street (North) in downtown Peterborough, which sold candy and a form of Chiclets under the product name "Elizabeth's Best".

O'Connor married Mary Ellen Hayes. With $500 in financing from local partners they moved to Toronto in 1912 and opened a new store at 354 Yonge Street.

== Laura Secord candy company ==
In 1913, he opened the Laura Secord candy store on (at 354) Yonge Street. In 1919 he expanded across Canada and into the United States, where the chain was known as Fanny Farmer candy stores. In 1923 Laura Secord became the first candy manufacturer in the world to introduce a profit-sharing plan.

== Later life ==
In 1935, he was appointed to the Senate of Canada by Liberal Prime Minister William Lyon Mackenzie King. He represented the senatorial division of Scarborough Junction, Ontario until his death in 1939.

Frank and Mary Ellen had a daughter, Mary; and Frank adopted Mary Ellen's young son William.

O'Connor survived his wife, who died in 1931, and died at this estate at age 54.

== Legacy ==
A Roman Catholic, O'Connor gave $500,000 in the 1930s to the Archdiocese of Toronto under the trusteeship of Cardinal James Charles McGuigan, one of numerous bequests to causes and organizations in his faith.

Senator O'Connor College School, a Toronto Catholic District School Board high school, was named in his honour.

His 600 acre estate was later acquired by the Toronto Catholic School Board (located next to the high school named after him) and sold. It was being restored and has been damaged by a fire in 2012. The remaining lands of the 240 hectares estate was developed for residential use.

One of the 15 islands that make up Toronto Islands Park is called Senator Frank Patrick O'Connor Island. There are no buildings on this island and it is only accessible by water.
