= Percy Creek (Northumberland County) =

- Location of the mouth of Percy Creek in southern Ontario
- Etymology: Named after Elizabeth Percy, Duchess of Northumberland

Location
- Country: Canada
- Province: Ontario
- Region: Central Ontario
- County: Northumberland
- Municipalities: Trent Hills; Alnwick/Haldimand

Physical characteristics
- Source: Unnamed marsh
  - location: Alnwick/Haldimand
  - coordinates: 44°10′30″N 78°03′26″W
  - elevation: 255 m (837 ft)
- Mouth: Trent River
  - location: Trent Hills
  - coordinates: 44°15′01″N 77°49′01″W
  - elevation: 116 m (381 ft)

Basin features
- River system: Great Lakes Basin
- Tributaries
  - right: Burnley Creek

Percy Creek is a stream in the municipalities of Trent Hills and Alnwick/Haldimand, Northumberland County, in Central Ontario, Canada. It is in the Great Lakes Basin and is a right tributary of the Trent River. Percy Creek is named after Elizabeth Percy, Duchess of Northumberland.

== Course ==
Percy Creek begins at an unnamed marsh, about 2 kilometres (1.2 mi) south of the community of Roseneath, in geographic Alnwick Township in the municipality of Alnwick/Haldimand. It flows northeast through several portions of the lands of the Alderville First Nation, passes into geographic Percy Township in the municipality of Trent Hills, and reaches its northernmost point north of the community of Brickley. It then heads south, flowing through Dartford Pond and over its impounding dam (with a fish ladder), then under the bridge for County Road 24 at the community of Dartford, then turns east. Percy Creek passes under County Road 25, over a small dam, takes in the right tributary Burnley Creek, turns north, heads into geographic Seymour Township, passes under County Road 30, and reaches its mouth at the Trent River at the community of Meyersburg. The Trent River flows to the Bay of Quinte on Lake Ontario.

== See also ==
- List of rivers of Ontario
