= Burnley Creek =

- Location of the mouth of Burnley Creek in southern Ontario

Location
- Country: Canada
- Province: Ontario
- Region: Central Ontario
- County: Northumberland
- Municipalities: Trent Hills; Alnwick/Haldimand

Physical characteristics
- Source: Confluence of unnamed streams
  - location: Alnwick/Haldimand
  - coordinates: 44°07′12″N 78°05′40″W
  - elevation: 257 m (843 ft)
- Mouth: Percy Creek
  - location: Trent Hills
  - coordinates: 44°13′17″N 77°50′35″W
  - elevation: 122 m (400 ft)

Basin features
- River system: Great Lakes Basin

Burnley Creek is a stream in the municipalities of Trent Hills and Alnwick/Haldimand, Northumberland County, in Central Ontario, Canada. It is in the Great Lakes Basin and is a right tributary of Percy Creek.

== Course ==
Burnley Creek begins at the confluence of two unnamed streams, on the north slope of the Oak Ridges Moraine, about 3.5 kilometres (2.2 mi) south of the community of Fenella, in geographic Haldimand Township in the municipality of Alnwick/Haldimand. It flows east, passes under County Road 45, continues east through a portion of Peter's Woods Provincial Park, and reaches the community of Burnley where it flows under County Road 29. Burnley Creek passes into geographic Percy Township in the municipality of Trent Hills, and flows through the former mill pond of the community of Warkworth. The creek continues east and reaches its mouth at Percy Creek, about 3.5 kilometres (2.2 mi) southwest of the community of Meyersburg. Percy Creek flows via the Trent River to the Bay of Quinte on Lake Ontario.

== See also ==
- List of rivers of Ontario
