= Northumberland South (Province of Canada electoral district) =

Province of Canada electoral district

Northumberland South Canada West
Province of Canada electoral district

Defunct pre-Confederation electoral district
- Legislature: Legislative Assembly of the Province of Canada
- District created: 1841
- District abolished: 1867
- First contested: 1841
- Last contested: 1863

Northumberland South was an electoral district of the Legislative Assembly of the Parliament of the Province of Canada, in Canada West (now Ontario). It was created in 1841, upon the establishment of the Province of Canada by the union of Upper Canada and Lower Canada. Northumberland South was represented by one member in the Legislative Assembly. It was abolished in 1867, upon the creation of Canada and the province of Ontario.

== Boundaries ==
Northumberland South electoral district was located in the southern portion of Northumberland County, on the north shore of Lake Ontario, east of what is now Toronto. As the county seat, Cobourg was the major centre.

The Union Act, 1840 had merged the two provinces of Upper Canada and Lower Canada into the Province of Canada, with a single Parliament. The separate parliaments of Lower Canada and Upper Canada were abolished. The Union Act provided that the pre-existing electoral boundaries of Upper Canada would continue to be used in the new Parliament, unless altered by the Union Act itself.

Northumberland South was a new electoral district, created by the Union Act as the south riding of Northumberland County. Northumberland County had originally been bounded by Lake Ontario and extended north, as described by a proclamation of the first Lieutenant Governor of Upper Canada, John Graves Simcoe, in 1792, and as further defined by a statute of Upper Canada in 1798.

Prior to the Union Act, Northumberland County had been represented by two members in the Legislative Assembly of Upper Canada. The Union Act split Northumberland County into two separate ridings, Northumberland North and Northumberland South, each represented by one member. The boundaries for Northumberland South were:

... the South Riding of the last-mentioned County shall consist of the following Townships, namely, Hamilton, Haldimand, Cramak, Murray, Seymour, Percy;

== Members of the Legislative Assembly ==
Northumberland South was represented by one member in the Legislative Assembly. The following were the members for Northumberland South.

| Parliament | Years | Members | Party |
|---|---|---|---|
| 1st Parliament; 1841–1844 | 1841–1844 | George Morss Jukes Boswell | Unionist; moderate Reformer |

== Abolition ==
Northumberland South electoral district was abolished on July 1, 1867, when the British North America Act, 1867 came into force, creating Canada and splitting the Province of Canada into Quebec and Ontario. It was succeeded by two electoral districts in the House of Commons of Canada, Northumberland East and Northumberland West and by two electoral districts with the same names in the Legislative Assembly of Ontario.
