= Campbellford Memorial Hospital =

- Location of Campbellford Memorial Hospital in Ontario

Geography
- Location: Campbellford, Trent Hills, Northumberland County, Ontario, Canada
- Coordinates: 44.3122°N 77.7897°W

Organization
- Care system: Public Medicare (Canada) (OHIP)
- Type: District General
- Affiliated university: University of Toronto Faculty of Medicine
- Network: Central East LHIN

Services
- Standards: Ontario class C and class G
- Emergency department: Yes
- Beds: 38

History
- Founded: 1953

Links
- Website: www.cmh.ca
- Lists: Hospitals in Canada

The Campbellford Memorial Hospital is an Ontario class G 38-bed hospital in the community of Campbellford, municipality of Trent Hills, Northumberland County in central Ontario, Canada. It opened in 1953, and is the largest employer in the community. It serves approximately 40,000 residents across Northumberland, Peterborough, and Hastings Counties. The hospital also serves a significant number of seasonal residents and tourists during the summer months.

Patient Information April 1, 2025 to March 31st 2026
Total Emergency Department Visits	19,148
Average Daily ED Visits	52.46
Total Admissions	1282
Total Patient Days (Inpatient Unit)	12,947
Average Daily Occupancy Rate	93.35%
Total Day Surgery Patients	1211
Total Diagnostic Imaging Patients	27,088
Total Lab Tests Complete	148,915
Total Mental Health Appointments	4194
Total Number of Staff	265
2026/27 Operating Budget	$37.9 Million

== Facilities ==
Positioned between Belleville, Cobourg and Peterborough, CMH offers a range of acute care services, including an Inpatient Unit, Special Care Unit, Diagnostic Imaging Department, Laboratory, a variety of Out-Patient Clinics and a 24/7 Emergency Department. In addition, the hospital also supports community programs such as Mental Health services, the Geriatric Assessment and Intervention Network (GAIN), and Supportive Housing initiatives.
