= 2014 Northumberland County municipal elections =

Local election in Ontario, Canada

Elections were held in Northumberland County, Ontario, on October 27, 2014, in conjunction with municipal elections across the province.

== Northumberland County Council ==
The Northumberland County Council consists of the seven mayors of its constituent municipalities.

| Position | Elected |
|---|---|
| Mayor of Alnwick/Haldimand | John Logel |
| Mayor of Brighton | Mark Walas |
| Mayor of Cobourg | Gil Brocanier |
| Mayor of Cramahe | Marc Coombs |
| Mayor of Hamilton | Mark Lovshin |
| Mayor of Port Hope | Bob Sanderson |
| Mayor of Trent Hills | Dwight Boyd |

== Alnwick/Haldimand ==
| Mayoral Candidate | Vote | % |
|---|---|---|
| John Logel | 1,455 | 58.69 |
| Dalton McDonald (X) | 938 | 37.84 |
| Sam Rizza | 86 | 3.47 |

== Brighton ==
| Mayoral Candidate | Vote | % |
|---|---|---|
| Mark Walas (X) | 3,143 | 58.51 |
| Mike Vandertoorn | 2,229 | 41.49 |

== Cobourg ==
| Mayoral Candidate | Vote | % |
|---|---|---|
| Gil Brocanier (X) | 4,028 | 52.64 |
| Miriam Mutton | 1,825 | 23.85 |
| Don Kirkup | 1,799 | 23.51 |

== Cramahe ==
| Mayoral Candidate | Vote | % |
|---|---|---|
| Marc Coombs (X) | 1,319 | 53.36 |
| Patricia S. Westrope | 1,153 | 46.64 |

== Hamilton ==
| Mayoral Candidate | Vote | % |
|---|---|---|
| Mark Lovshin (X) | 2,313 | 58.72 |
| Donna Cole | 1,626 | 41.28 |

== Port Hope ==
| Mayoral Candidate | Vote | % |
|---|---|---|
| Bob Sanderson | 3,105 | 48.27 |
| Julia Mavis | 1,513 | 23.52 |
| Paul Andrus | 909 | 14.13 |
| John Floyd | 625 | 9.72 |
| John Bickle | 203 | 3.16 |
| Robert Chatten | 60 | 0.93 |
| Jamie Manuel Castillo | 17 | 0.26 |

== Trent Hills ==
| Mayoral Candidate | Vote | % |
|---|---|---|
| Dwight Boyd | 2,008 | 30 |
| James Douglas Peeling | 656 | 5 |
| Hector Macmillan (X) | 391 | 65 |
