= George Morss Jukes Boswell =

Lawyer and judge in Canada West, Province of Canada

George Morss Jukes Boswell, QC

Member of the Legislative Assembly of the Province of Canada for Northumberland South
- In office 1841–1844
- Preceded by: New position
- Succeeded by: George Barker Hall

Judge of the County Court for the Counties of Northumberland and Durham
- In office 1845–1882

Personal details
- Born: June 23, 1804 Gosport, England
- Died: August 29, 1889 (aged 85) Cobourg, Ontario
- Party: Reformer
- Spouse(s): (1) Susannah Radcliffe (1829–1870; her death) (2) Mary Wrench (1872–1889; his death)
- Children: 13, including Arthur Radcliffe Boswell
- Profession: Lawyer; judge

George Morss Jukes Boswell, QC, (1804 – 1889) was a lawyer and judge in Canada West, Province of Canada. Born in England of Scottish descent, his family emigrated to Upper Canada in 1822. He was married twice, with thirteen children.

Boswell was called to the bar of Upper Canada and had a very successful legal career, practising at Cobourg in the county of Northumberland. He was the first Queen's Counsel appointed by the government of the new Province of Canada in 1841.

He was elected to the Legislative Assembly of the Province of Canada in 1841, serving one term as a moderate Reformer who supported responsible government. In 1845 he was appointed a County Court judge, a position he held until 1882. He died on August 29, 1889.

== Family and early life ==
Boswell was born in Gosport, England on June 23, 1804. His grandfather and several great-uncles had served in the Royal Navy, while his father was a solicitor. His family was originally from Scotland, and was related to James Boswell, the biographer of Samuel Johnson. His family emigrated to Upper Canada in 1822.

In 1829, Boswell married Susannah Radcliffe in Buffalo, New York, with whom he had twelve children. The couple was married until her death in 1870. One of their sons, Arthur Radcliffe Boswell, became a lawyer involved in municipal politics in Toronto, serving one term as mayor of Toronto. Boswell later re-married, to Mary Wrench of Cornhill, London, in 1872, with whom he was married upon his death. They had one daughter, who died young.

== Legal, business and militia activities ==
Boswell was called to the bar of Upper Canada in the Michaelmas term, 1827. He developed a reputation as a leading barrister, and in 1841, was the first person appointed Queen's Counsel by the government of the new Province of Canada.

Although he was a supporter of the reform movement, Boswell was opposed to the violent rebellion advocated by individuals such as William Lyon Mackenzie. During the rebellion, he served in the Upper Canada militia in the Chippewa area of the Niagara Peninsula, near Navy Island where Mackenzie set up a headquarters and proclaimed the Republic of Canada.

After the rebellion was suppressed, Boswell was one of counsel retained in 1838 to defend several of the individuals accused of high treason in the Rebellion. Two of the accused he defended were John Montgomery, the owner of the tavern where the Battle of Montgomery's Tavern had occurred in December, 1837, and Thomas David Morrison, who had been a reform supporter but had spoken against rebellion. Morrison was acquitted, but left for the United States, fearing he might face further charges. Montgomery was convicted and sentenced to transportation to Tasmania, but managed to escape to New York before the sentence could be implemented.

Boswell was active in business in the Cobourg area, including being the first secretary of the Cobourg Harbour Company and being involved with the Cobourg and Peterborough Railway Company. He also acquired substantial land-holdings in Cobourg and the surrounding area.

== Member of the Legislative Assembly ==
Boswell stood for election to the Legislative Assembly of Upper Canada in the general election of 1836, but was defeated. In 1841, following the union of Lower Canada and Upper Canada into the Province of Canada, he was elected to the Legislative Assembly of the first Parliament of the Province of Canada, for the riding of Northumberland South, which included the town of Cobourg.

In the Assembly, Boswell was a moderate reformer, but with a strong commitment to responsible government. In the first session in 1841, he voted in support of the new union and the policies of Governor General Lord Sydenham, and in opposition to the more "ultra" reformers led by Robert Baldwin. However, he also strongly challenged the main government leader, William Draper, to agree with the general principle of responsible government, namely that the executive government had to have the support of the legislative assembly. Draper's comments in reply were one of the first recognitions by the government of this point. Over the three years of the first Parliament, Boswell gradually aligned with Baldwin's reform group.

== County Court judge, retirement and death ==
Boswell did not run again in the 1844 general election. The next year, he was appointed to the County Court for the combined counties of Northumberland and Durham. Five years after his appointment, he wrote an open letter to Baldwin, at that point the Attorney General for Canada West, outlining his thoughts on court reform. He suggested that the procedure in the County Courts could be simplified, thus reducing the costs to the litigants. He also suggested that the County Court jurisdiction be increased, to provide more expeditious justice than was the case in the Court of Queen's Bench.

Boswell remained on the court for thirty-seven years, finally retiring in 1882 at age 78. When he died in 1889, he was the last survivor of the first Parliament of the Province of Canada, and also the last survivor of the first group of Queen's Counsel appointed in 1841.
