= Hastings, Ontario =

Hastings
- Village
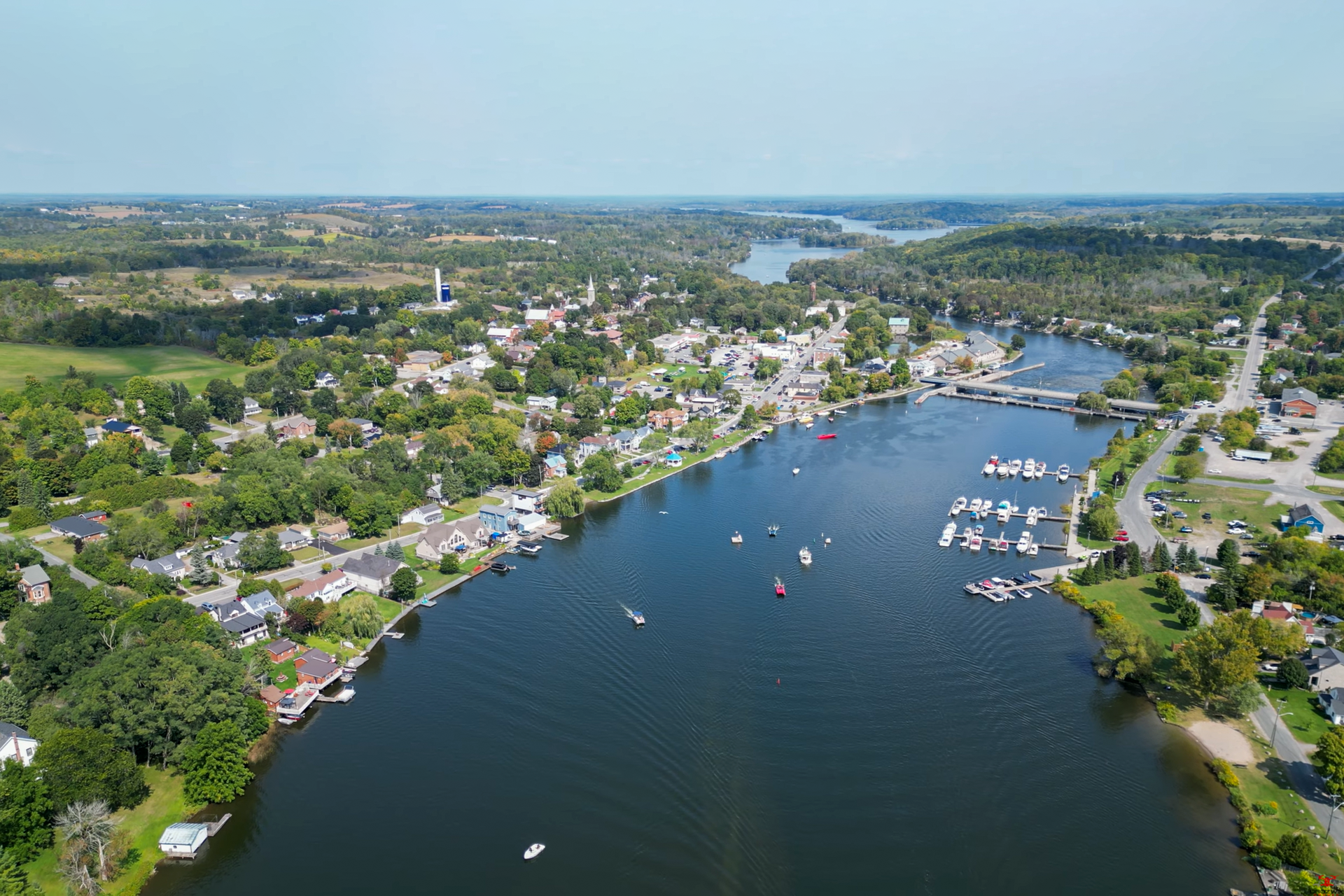
- Aerial view of Hastings, Ontario in 2024
- Motto: "The Hub of the Trent"
- Location in southern Ontario
- Coordinates: 44°18′N 77°57′W
- Country: Canada
- Province: Ontario
- Municipality: Trent Hills
- County: Northumberland
- Established: 1810
- Incorporated: 1874
- Amalgamated: 2001

Government
  - Mayor: Robert Crate
  - Governing Body: Trent Hills Municipal Council

Area
  - Village: 2.36 km^{2} (0.91 sq mi)

Population (2001 Census)
  - Village: 1,208
  - Density: 511.9/km^{2} (1,326/sq mi)
  - Metro: 12,569 (Trent Hills)
- Time zone: UTC-5 (Eastern (EST))
  - Summer (DST): UTC-4 (EDT)
- Postal Code: K0L 1Y0
- Area code: 705

Hastings is a community within the municipality of Trent Hills, Northumberland County, in the province of Ontario, Canada. It is situated on the Trent-Severn Waterway and the Trans Canada Trail in what is considered to be Ontario's "cottage country". It can be reached from Highway 401 by exiting at exit 474 at Cobourg and going north on County Road 45. It can be reached from Highway 7 at the Norwood exit going south (also on County Road 45).

Hastings had a population of 1,208 at the 2001 Census. It is known as "The Hub of the Trent" as Hastings is directly on the Trent River and serves as a major centre for tourists, boaters, and fishermen. One of Hastings' notable symbols is a tall, blue water tower which is perched prominently on high ground in the northern portion of the community.

Hastings is now part of the municipality of Trent Hills and makes up the second most substantial population centre in the municipality. The position of mayor of Trent Hills was filled in November 2017 by Hastings councillor and deputy mayor Robert Crate, following the death of Hector Macmillan who had served as mayor since 2003. Replacing Bob Crate as Ward 3 Hastings councillor is businessman, Michael Metcalf.

A marina was built in Hastings which added to the already bustling waterfront. In continuation of the street-scape design theme from the new Hastings Village Marina a Hastings Waterfront & Downtown Improvement Plan was prepared in early 2009. In 2009, after a four-year break, the local Chamber of Commerce was revived.

The largest annual event in Hastings, the Canada Day celebrations, includes amongst other events a parade that runs through downtown during the day and a fireworks display at the waterfront at dusk. In recent years the fireworks display has attracted an increasing number of spectators and despite Hastings being a relatively small community the display has been considered one of the best in Ontario.

In 2012 Hastings was named Canada's Ultimate Fishing Town by the World Fishing Network. Muskie, pickerel, pike, walleye, large and smallmouth bass, catfish, perch, crappie, and bluegill are found in Hastings in abundance.

== History ==
=== General history ===
The first European presence in the area dates to 1615 when Samuel de Champlain made a visit to Huronia. However, his "journals are too vague to make any final decisions." about the exact route taken. In 1810 James Crooks purchased 1,050 acres (4.2 km^{2}) of land on the north and south shores of the rapids at the top of Rice Lake, Ontario. A map prepared by Lieutenant James Smith in 1816–17 shows the name Little Bobakaijuen opposite rapids. The settlement of Crooks' Rapids was named in 1820. "As late as 1835, the only house on the site of the present village of Hastings was a small frame building on the bank, erected several years before that date by the Hon. Mr. Crooks as a mill, containing one run of very common stones. It is doubtful whether it ever ground much, and it is believed to have been intended rather as a means to secure the valuable mill privilege, at that place, rather than for practical utility."

Between 1837 and 1839 at a preliminary estimated cost of £7062, a lock was built at Crooks' Rapids, together with a dam and slides, "the expenditure on which gave occupation to a great number of persons; laid the foundation for the village of Hastings".

The following is a contemporary description of the village in the middle 19th century:

From the building of the locks at Crook's Rapids in 1837–38, that place gradually grew into a thriving village of much importance. T. Coughlan, Esq., was the first hotel keeper and store keeper in that place. Its most marked progress took place after the chief portion of the property was acquired by Henry Fowlds, Esq., and his sons, and their removal there in 1857. A new grist and flouring mill was added to the old one, a saw mill of great power and numerous saws, capable of manufacturing large quantities of lumber yearly for the foreign market, were speedily erected. These were followed in later years, by other extensive factories filled with valuable machinery. Adjoining the saw mill mentioned, was a large woolen factory, which had just got into active operation when it was swept away by a most destructive fire in 1863, which also consumed the sawmill and its contents, and also a large planing mill and sash and door factory just erected by Mr. Henry Lye in close proximity. This great loss for a time checked the progress of the village, and paralyzed the enterprise of several active and industrious citizens. Another large factory erected for a cotton mill, a wool carding and knitting factory, and a bit larger saw mill than the former one, had in the meantime been erected on the south side of the river, just below the bridge, and these important structures with their valuable machinery, continue in active operation, and not only reflect much credit upon the enterprise of the place, but contribute much towards its prosperity.

Another serious fire occurred in Hastings in the spring of 1864, by which a fine brick store and a large stock of goods were almost entirely destroyed. Hastings was buoyant, rapidly progressive, and looking forward to the time ere long, it might become an incorporated village, when these severe disasters, followed by the general depression occasioned by scant harvests, and the embarrassment of the agricultural community, placed a barrier against further progress, and caused a withdrawal of a portion of the inhabitants to seek more remunerative employment elsewhere. But this dark day, it is believed, has to a threat extent passed away; and increased hope and renewed enterprise promise ere long to restore this fine village to more than its former prosperity.

For many years Hastings was but poorly furnished with church accommodation. This want has, however, been abundantly supplied, and several fine church edifices crown the rising ground which commands a beautiful view of the river and the bustling village. The first of these was the Free Presbyterian church, a large frame structure, erected in 1858, in which the Rev. James Bowie ministered for several years. An Episcopal church, also frame, pleasantly situated on the south side of the river, followed in 1863, of which the Rev. M. A. Farrar is Incumbent. In 1864, the Wesleyan Methodists, with commendable zeal and enterprise, completed a tasteful and commodious brick church, while in 1865, a much larger and well finished edifice of stone was erected and dedicated by the Roman Catholics, chiefly through the zeal and indefatigable exertions of their pastor, the Rev. J. Quirk.

A neat and tasteful brick school house has now been many years in use, -- two or more teachers employed, and the most liberal provision made for the education of the rising generation.

In the year 1864, a printing press and type were introduced to the village, by Mr. A. E. Hayter, and the Hastings Messenger was for a time published there, but the attempt was premature, and during the period of depression referred to, the effort was abandoned.

Hastings, besides its unlimited water power, is pleasantly and advantageously situated on the river Trent, which furnishes communication by steamboats with the Cobourg railway at Harwood at Rice lake, and other points above and below the village. A new steamboat, the Forest City, was built and launched here in 1858, by the Messrs. Fowlds, and has since continued to ply up and down the river and lake in the transport of goods, passengers and lumber.

In Hastings' early history, lumber from the northern part of Peterborough passed through Hastings locks on its way to Lake Ontario. The Messrs. Fowlds, at Hastings, also manufactured from two to three million feet of sawn lumber annually ... which at Port Hope was worth $12 per 1000 feet. It originally had a foundry, a cotton factory, grist mills, a stone Roman Catholic Church, Church of England and Presbyterian and Methodist Churches.

The locks were completed in 1844 and the waterways became part of the Trent-Severn passage. There are 60.5 kilometres (37.6 mi) from Lock 18 in Hastings to Lock 19 in Peterborough. Henry Fowlds bought Crooks' Rapids in 1851 and renamed the settlement Hastings in 1852, the year of its post office opening. The population rose from 200 in 1852 to 1500 in 1882.

=== The Fowlds family ===
The Fowlds family had a large influence on the village of Hastings in its early history. Henry Fowlds bought and renamed the settlement of Crooks' Rapids to Hastings. He named the village after Lady Flora Hastings, a boyhood acquaintance. His family played significant roles within the community, such as reeve (now the term "mayor" is used in most communities), and also started small businesses. There is a park in Hastings named after Henry Fowlds.

Henry Fowlds was born in 1790 in Scotland. In 1813, he married Jane Marshall Steele. Together they had ten children, (Eliza, John, James S., Robert H., Elizabeth, Henry M., Mary C., William J., Mary Anne, and Theresa) of which only five survived (James S., Elizabeth, Henry M., William J., and Theresa). James S. (1818–1884) married Margaret MacGregor and they had nine children between the years of 1845 and 1860. Their seventh child, Frederick W. (1857–1930), married Elizabeth Sutherland and they had three children, Helen, Eric, and Donald. Eric and Donald were soldiers in World War I and Helen was a nurse in the same war. Helen married Gerald Marryat after the war and became a remarkable local historian of the Peterborough region. Helen Fowlds Marryat died on June 16, 1965. Her records and papers were bequeathed to Trent University.

The family came to North America in 1821, settling first in New York City, and then in Hartford in 1833. In 1834, they crossed the border and settled in Prince Edward County, Upper Canada. The Fowlds family settled in Asphodel Township in 1836, and then moved on to Westwood, where they set up a saw mill in conjunction with Dr. John Gilchrist in what was to become the village of Keene.

Henry Martin Fowlds (b. ca 1826 in New York City – d. July 3, 1907 in Hastings) purchased the water rights, land and buildings of Crooks' Rapids, later known as Hastings, from the Honourable James Crooks, on September 27, 1851. Henry Fowlds and sons built upon this base, expanding their original saw mill to a corporate business of a saw mill, grist mill, general store and post office. The three Fowlds' brothers, James, Henry M. and William, set up a lumber and flour business under the name of Jas. L. Fowlds and Bros. This company was terminated with the death of James Fowlds in 1884. The Fowlds were quite active in Hastings, occupying the seat of reeve, and the office of postmaster. From 1844 to 1852, Henry Fowlds was County Superintendent of Schools. Captain Henry J. Fowlds commanded the 57-man Hastings Infantry Company in June 1866 in response to the Fenian Invasion James S. Fowlds was postmaster in 1867. Postmaster was a position that the family kept for over 90 years in the village. These public-minded men served on local councils, notably as reeve. Their industry resulted in a rise of population from 200 in 1852 to 1,500 in 1882.

== Transportation ==
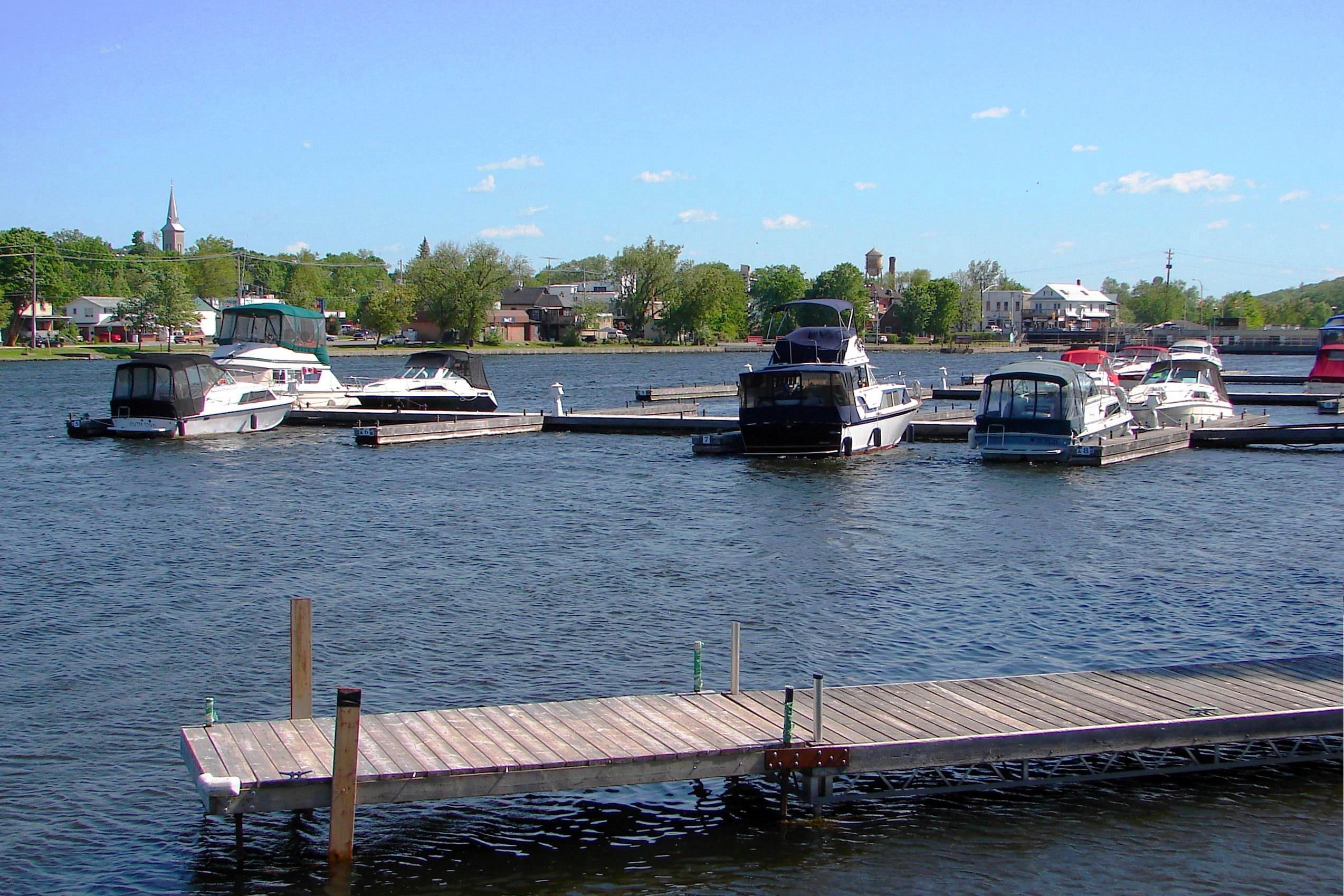
Hastings as seen across the Trent-Severn Waterway

The Trent River, part of the Trent-Severn Waterway, is crucial for local boat transportation as well as recreation. The river connects directly to Lake Ontario, which is south of Hastings, making Hastings easily accessible by boat. Hastings is a hub for fishermen and boaters because of the marina; many people travel through and around Hastings each year.

== Demographics and religion ==
In 2001, Hastings' population totaled 1,208, increasing by 6% from 1996 to 2001, when Hastings had a population of 1,140 people. There are 537 private dwellings located within Hastings, and the population density is 511.9 people per square kilometre (1,326/sq mi). The total area of the village is 2.36 square kilometres (0.91 sq mi).

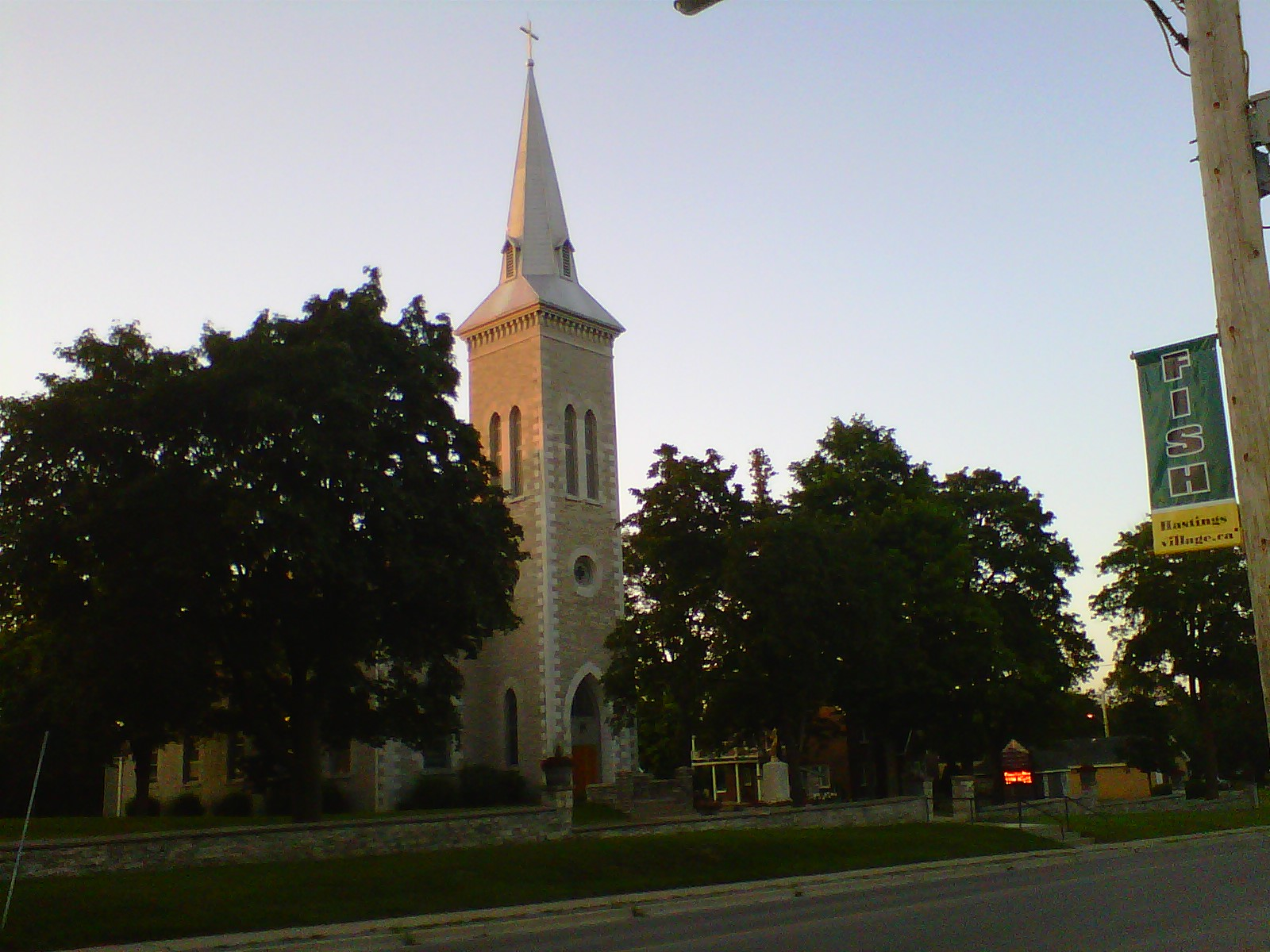
Our Lady of Mount Carmel church located in the north part of Hastings, on Albert Street East.

The White population accounts for the vast majority of Hastings' residents, at 99%. The remaining 1% is made up of First Nations, Chinese and South Asian people. During the summer months, fishing on the Trent River in Hastings is locally popular, causing a short-term population increase due to the influx of tourist anglers. These tourists tend to be more diverse than the permanent residents of Hastings; for example, there are many ethnic Chinese fishermen. Most of Hastings' year-round residents speak English only, at about 90%. The majority of Hastings' full-time residents are Christian, although about 25% reported that they have no religious affiliation.

Population History
1991	1996	2001
1,148	1,140	1,208

== Government ==
Hastings was incorporated as a village in 1874. In 2001, the Village of Hastings was merged with the Town of Campbellford, Township of Seymour and the Township of Percy to form the Municipality of Trent Hills.

== Education ==
Hastings Public School provides elementary education to Hastings' children. For secondary education, Hastings residents attend the Campbellford District High School. The nearby Norwood District High School serves the minority of residents who live in Peterborough County. These schools are all part of the Kawartha Pine Ridge District School Board. Peterborough, the most populous city in the area, has two institutions of post-secondary education: Fleming College and Trent University. Trent University's academic focus is on environmental, cultural, and science studies. Vocational education is provided by Fleming College, which is a multidisciplinary institution with four campuses. The college is also a well-respected business skills training centre.

Belleville, another nearby city, also provides post-secondary education with Loyalist College, well known in the region for its journalism, photojournalism, radio and television broadcasting programs as well as its health services programs.

The municipality of Trent Hills is currently working to improve the local educational system, and to make it more convenient for residents to attend university or college without having to leave Trent Hills. After elementary and secondary education, residents tend to leave the area for university and college education, not to return, which inevitably depletes the local economy.

== Economy ==
One of the Hastings welcome signs.

The municipality of Trent Hills is currently attempting to revitalize the economy with the help of an updated Trent Hills Economic Strategic Plan. A major undertaking was the construction of a new recreational facility for Hastings, a field house opened on July 3, 2015 by Canadian astronaut Chris Hadfield. The facility features a walking track, soccer field, golf driving range and courts for basketball, ball hockey, and racquet sports. It has the capacity to accommodate many varied and unique training activities, as well as clinics and workshops. The Hastings downtown core runs along central Bridge Street and central Front Street, with two- and three-storey buildings along much of Front St. The community's only set of street lights is located at this intersection. Elmhirst's Resort in nearby Keene is a local tourist attraction. Aside from the resort, there are trailer parks, beaches and camping grounds in the Hastings area. Most of the local beaches and camping grounds are located outside of Hastings on Rice Lake.

The local post office at 9 Front Street West services locals with lock boxes and three rural routes.

== Recreation ==
The Lang-Hastings Trail is a 33 km rail trail that runs between Peterborough and Hastings, and passes through Keene and other areas. It is part of the Trans-Canada Trail, the longest trail build in the country.

== Climate ==
Because of the influence of the Great Lakes, Ontario experiences smaller variations in temperature and higher precipitation than would otherwise be expected for a region in the heart of a continent.

The last snowfall of the winter season is often experienced in spring. In the early portion of spring, climate can remain much like winter in Hastings, with possible snowstorms, lake effect snow, and cold temperatures. The temperature can plummet to less than −10 °C (14 °F), feeling much colder with the wind chill. To counter the winter temperatures, daytime highs can reach about 20 °C (68 °F). By mid-to-late spring, life returns to the area. April is the month in which the last snowfall usually occurs. By May, temperatures rise and rain often falls.

In the summer months, the Great Lakes have a cooling effect. However, heat waves lasting up to a week, with temperatures higher than 30 °C (86 °F), are not uncommon. The temperature can feel closer to 40 °C (104 °F) or even 50 °C (122 °F) when temperature and humidity (humidex) is taken into account. Thunderstorms are also very frequent during the summer months, especially on very hot days. Smog is an issue for Hastings and the rest of southern Ontario, primarily during hot and sunny weather.

In the fall, the release of heat stored in the lakes has a moderating effect. This provides relief from the overly-hot summer temperatures. The first snowfall of the season is often in October or November, and prior to that, Hastings and the region experience frost. Lake effect snow and snow squalls often occur during the fall months. Even in early fall, late September, temperatures can dip down to near zero. Under the right conditions, frost may be produced. Daytime highs can vary from above 20 °C (68 °F) in early fall to well below freezing in late fall.

Winter in Hastings is characterized by alternating currents of cold arctic air and relatively warm air masses from the Gulf of Mexico. The normal winter temperature range is −5 to 0 °C (23 to 32 °F), and it can get quite a bit warmer. Temperatures, however, can dip below −20 °C (−4 °F) before taking wind chill into account.

Below is some additional information on climate, including average temperatures and precipitation.

Climate data for Peterborough Airport
Month	Jan	Feb	Mar	Apr	May	Jun	Jul	Aug	Sep	Oct	Nov	Dec	Year
Mean daily maximum °C	−3	−1	3	12	19	23	27	25	20	13	6	0	12
Mean daily minimum °C	−14	−13	−6	0	6	10	13	12	7	2	−1	−9	1
Average precipitation mm	50.8	55.9	66.0	66.0	71.1	71.1	68.6	81.3	73.7	71.1	76.2	76.2	828
Mean daily maximum °F	25	27	37	52	65	73	79	77	68	55	43	30	53
Mean daily minimum °F	5	7	18	32	42	50	55	53	45	34	27	13	32
Average precipitation inches	2.0	2.2	2.6	2.6	2.8	2.8	2.7	3.2	2.9	2.8	3.0	3.0	32.6
Source 1: theweathernetwork.com
Source 2: weather.com

== Media ==
In November 2017, a newspaper serving Hastings—Quinte West News—was one of 36 community newspapers across Ontario to be closed. The remaining newspapers, the Community Press and The Tribune (Tribune Trent Hills), serve other local villages and towns as well as Hastings.

CKOL-FM is a community radio station which broadcasts from Campbellford to serve Trent Hills and the surrounding area. It broadcasts at 93.7 on the FM dial, and typically plays oldies music. CHEX-TV (CBC affiliate) is the nearest television station to Hastings, and provides regular programming, local news and current events. It broadcasts from Peterborough at Television Hill.

== Notable residents ==
- Fibre artist Dorothy Caldwell is a resident.
- Wisconsin State Senator Chester Howell Werden was born in Hastings.
- Humanitarian Mark Joseph Cameron MB, MSM is a graduate of Hastings Public School, Campbellford District High School, Charles Sturt University (Australia), Harvard University Program in Refugee Trauma (Cambridge Massachusetts) and Humber College (Toronto/Canada). Mark is a third generation Hastings resident currently residing on his grandfather's property (Joseph Mulholland) in Hastings village proper. Mark spends much of his time abroad overseeing the international NGO he co-founded (CIMRO.ca). Mark is the Recipient of the Medal of Bravery and the Meritorious Service Medal, both of which were awarded to him by David Johnston, Governor General of Canada, on behalf of Queen Elizabeth II and on behalf of all Canadians.
- Hockey Player Dit Clapper grew up in Hastings.

== Bibliography ==
Poole, Thomas W., M.D. A Sketch of the Early Settlement and Subsequent Progress of The Town of Peterborough, and of Each Township in the County of Peterborough., Peterborough: Printed by Robert Romaine, At the Office of the "Peterborough Review". 1867. Retrieved 2017-07-01
