= John Gilchrist (Province of Canada politician) =

Canadian politician, physician and businessman

Member of the Legislative Assembly of Upper Canada for Northumberland County
- In office 1836–1841
- Succeeded by: Position abolished

Member of the Legislative Assembly of the Province of Canada for Northumberland North
- In office 1841–1844
- Preceded by: New position
- Succeeded by: Adam Meyers

Personal details
- Born: February 9, 1792 Bedford, New Hampshire
- Died: September 15, 1859 (67 years old) Port Hope, Ontario
- Education: Yale; Dartmouth College
- Occupation: Businessman
- Profession: Doctor

John Gilchrist (February 9, 1792 – September 15, 1859) was a medical doctor and political figure in Canada West in the Province of Canada.

== Personal information ==
He was born in Bedford, New Hampshire in 1792 and studied at the medical school at Yale College and Dartmouth College. He apprenticed as a physician in Goffstown, New Hampshire and came to Hamilton Township in Upper Canada around 1817, swearing allegiance to the Crown on January 5, 1818. He was licensed to practise medicine in 1819; he set up practice first at Cobourg and later Peterborough. Gilchrist served as surgeon for the local militia. He moved to Otonabee Township, where he set up a sawmill and gristmill on the Indian River with Zacheus Burnham and later opened a general store and distillery. The settlement of Gilchrist’s Mills (later Keene) developed around these mills. He served as a director of the Cobourg Harbour Company and as chairman of the building committee for the Upper Canada Academy at Cobourg.

== Political career ==
He was elected to the Legislative Assembly of Upper Canada in 1834 for Northumberland County as a general supporter of the Reform movement, but was defeated in the election of 1836 which had a general swing against Reform candidates. He was charged in 1837 in relation to a small riot which broke out at his distillery in connection with the Upper Canada Rebellion, but the charges were dropped. In 1841, he was elected to the Legislative Assembly of the Province of Canada in the riding of Northumberland North. He was a supporter of the union of Lower Canada and Upper Canada, and a moderate reformer throughout his time in office. He did not stand for election in the general election of 1844.

He served as a district agent for the Crown Lands Department and was treasurer for Colborne District from 1842 to 1845. In 1849, he moved to Port Hope and continued to practice medicine until his death in 1859.
