= Mark Cameron (paramedic) =

Canadian Flight Paramedic

Mark Joseph Cameron, CM MB MSM (born March 29, 1969) is a Canadian Flight Paramedic who was awarded the Medal of Bravery in 2014 for direct line of duty action, and the Meritorious Service Medal in 2017 for his work in Syria.

Cameron is a founding member (with Khaled Almilaji and Jay Dahman) and former Vice President of Canadian International Medical Relief Organization (CIMRO), an internationally known non-governmental organization. CIMRO has been involved in numerous medical missions inside Syria helping with critical front-line combat medicine as well as vaccination and chemical response training.

He is currently a course director at Sunnybrook Health Sciences Centre in Toronto, Canada where he was awarded Teacher of the Year in 2014 and nominated for the prestigious “Premiers Award” for his work in paramedicine and long history of humanitarian disaster response work. He is also a teaching fellow at Stony Brook University (New York State), in the Mind-Brain Center for War Trauma.

== Education ==
Mark obtained his undergraduate degree in Health Sciences at Charles Sturt University in New South Wales, Australia. He continued his post-graduate studies at Humber College in Toronto, Ontario, where he obtained a diploma in paramedicine. He later received training at Sunnybrook Health Sciences Centre to become an advanced care paramedic through Metro Toronto Ambulance. In 2017, he obtained a post-graduate certificate at Harvard University where he specialized in global mental health and disaster planning.

== Career ==
A native of Hastings, Ontario, Cameron worked for Peterborough, Hastings County Emergency Medical Services for over 25 years. During this period, Mark also worked as a critical care flight paramedic, travelling around the world to facilitate the return of Canadians who became ill or injured while abroad. Currently, Mark leads the internationally known critical care program, known as CIMRO (Critical Incident Management Response Organization).

After forming CIMRO, Mark and his team frequently went on mission trips to China, Cambodia, Guyana and more known, Syria, where they were tasked with providing urgent medical relief and education to injured children and civilians. In 2011, Cameron's group was contacted by the United Nations (UN) to help assist with the polio vaccination campaign in Syria under the direction of the World Health Organization (WHO) and the UN. Their team provided mass immunization to more than 1.4 million children in Syria.

On one of their trips inside Syria post-civil war, Mark and their team brought along the Canadian Broadcasting Corporation (CBC) crew to cover the crisis. They returned many times after the crisis worsened to provide front-line medical assistance and education, clothing to children and support to local hospitals

== Awards and recognition ==
- Medal of Bravery (2014)
- Meritorious Service Medal (2017)
- Order of Canada (2024)
