= Arthur Radcliffe Boswell =

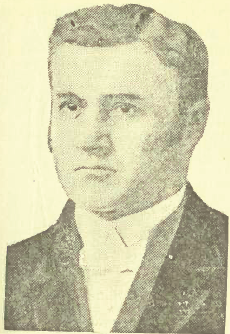

24th Mayor of Toronto
- In office 1883–1884
- Preceded by: William Barclay McMurrich
- Succeeded by: Alexander Manning

Personal details
- Born: January 3, 1838 Cobourg, Upper Canada
- Died: May 16, 1925 (aged 87) Toronto, Ontario, Canada
- Profession: Lawyer

Arthur Radcliffe Boswell (3 January 1838 – 16 May 1925) was a Canadian lawyer and politician, including as Mayor of Toronto.

== Early life and education ==
Boswell was born in Cobourg, Upper Canada, on 3 January 1838. His father was George Morss Jukes Boswell, a lawyer and judge, and his mother was Susan (née Radcliffe). Boswell was educated in the Brockville public school, Upper Canada College and the Royal Military School in Toronto. He studied law and became a member of the bar in 1865. Shortly afterwards he started practicing law in Toronto. He was Anglican.

== Municipal politics ==
In 1877 he was elected as alderman for the Toronto City Council, representing the ward of St George. He was re-elected every year, except in 1880. In 1882 he was chairman of the council's executive committee.

In 1883 he won the election to become mayor of Toronto against John Jacob Withrow, winning by 5 votes. During his term, the city annexed the village of Yorkville. He also tried to convince the council to fund initiatives to clean up and prevent wastewater from entering the Toronto Harbour, but was unsuccessful. The following year he was reelected by acclamation for a second term as mayor. During this second term, Boswell oversaw and hosted the celebrations of the city's 50th anniversary. His enthusiasm during the celebrations was praised, especially because of the large number of events that he attended. He declined to be nominated for a third term, starting a custom of the mayor of Toronto only serving two terms.

== Post-municipal career ==
Boswell returned to working as a lawyer after leaving the mayoralty. In 1911 Boswell was appointed Superintendent of Insurance for Ontario and Registrar of Loan Companies. He was also a freemason, a trustee for Toronto General Hospital and chairman of the Toronto Public Library. He was the commodore of the Royal Canadian Yacht Club from 1879 to 1883 and again from 1889 to 1896.

== Memorials ==
Boswell Avenue in Toronto was named after Boswell.
