= John Jacob Withrow =

Canadian businessman and politician

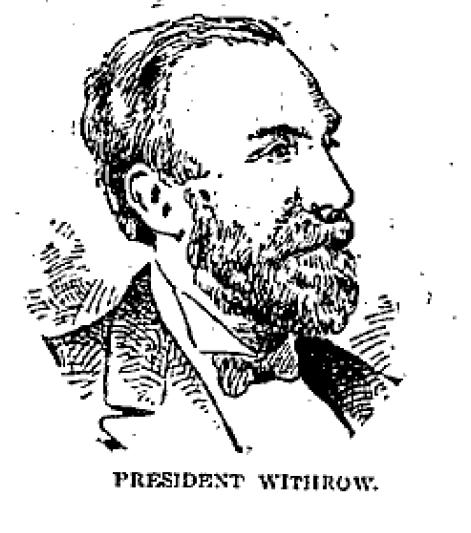
- Portrait of Withrow from The Evening Star, 1894

Personal details
- Born: 1833 York, Upper Canada
- Died: 5 August 1900 (aged 67) Toronto, Ontario
- Spouse: Margaret Foster (m. 1858; died 1900)

John Jacob Withrow (1833 – August 5, 1900) was a Toronto businessman and politician. He proposed the first edition of the Canadian National Exhibition and organised the annual event for several years.

Withrow was born in York, Upper Canada, and opened a construction business. In 1873, he was elected as alderman for the Toronto City Council. He tried to convince the Provincial Fair Association to permanently establish their annual fair in Toronto. When they refused, he established an annual fair in Toronto, which later became the Canadian National Exhibition. He twice ran, unsuccessfully, to become mayor of Toronto. After leaving city council, he sat on the board of various businesses and philanthropic organisations. He declared bankruptcy after losing his investments in a depression in the 1890s. He died in Toronto after suffering from a stroke.

== Early life ==
Withrow was born in 1833 in York, Upper Canada (later named Toronto). His parents were James Withrow and Ellen Sanderson. The Withrows originated from Orange County, South Carolina and likely fled to Rawdon, Hants, Nova Scotia after the American Revolution. He achieved his schooling at Toronto Academy, worked at an architect's office, and worked as a contractor for McBean and Withrow, his father's building firm. He then toured the northern United States to observe architecture trends in the region, and in the late 1850s he returned to Toronto and worked as a carpenter. In the late 1860s, he partnered with John Hillock to form a contractor and lumber merchant business called Withrow and Hillock.

== Political career and permanent fair ==
In 1873 Withrow was elected as alderman for St David's Ward in the Toronto City Council. The following year, he was elected in St Thomas's Ward as alderman, and would be reelected for in the subsequent three years. As alderman, he focused on bringing the annual provincial exhibition to Toronto every year, as before the exhibition had been held in various cities across the province. He led the city's exhibition committee when they enlarged the city's exhibition grounds and built permanent buildings. The Provincial Fair Association, the body that decided where the provincial exhibition was to be located, announced that the 1879 edition would take place in Ottawa, much to the chagrin of Withrow. At the closing banquet of the 1878 fair, Withrow announced that Toronto would host a permanent exhibition the subsequent year. Withrow did not consult the city or any other person before making this announcement. Withrow chaired the Industrial Exhibition Association of Toronto, the body that would organise the permanent fair in Toronto in the fall of 1879. The fair was successful and continued for subsequent years as the Canadian National Exhibition, with Withrow remaining chair of the association until his death.

In 1882, Withrow joined with other prominent Methodist businessmen to form Saskatchewan Land and Homestead Company Limited, a company that promoted the settlement of the territories north and west of Ontario. Withrow was the company's first president and remained in the position until his death. He was also the head of the board for a public bath built on the Toronto Islands called Wiman Bath.

== Mayoral campaigns ==
Withrow was nominated to become mayor of Toronto in 1883. During the campaign, he was criticised by the trade union movement for his treatment of his employees and for intervening in the 1872 printers' strike. He lost the election to Arthur Radcliffe Boswell by five votes. In 1885 he ran again to become mayor, but was defeated by the Conservative candidate Alexander Henderson Manning.

== Business career and philanthropy ==
In 1883, Withrow built a home on Hanlan's Point on the Toronto islands called the Lakeside Home for Little Children, which was used by Toronto's Hospital for Sick Children as a summer home. Withrow was also a trustee of the home. He also supervised the construction of a new Hospital for Sick Children in the late 1880s and fundraised for the project.

Withrow supplied the doors and sashes for the construction of Massey Hall and completed the carpentry work. During his lifetime he was the only member of the Massey Hall board who was not a member of the Massey family. Withrow was the president of a loan society called the Canadian Mutual Loan and Investment Company. A depression in the 1890s caused Withrow to declare bankruptcy in 1894 as their investments in property declined. In 1895 he was appointed as the chief assessor for Toronto.

== Personal life ==
Withrow married Margaret Foster and they had two daughters and three sons. Withrow was a Methodist. Withrow died on August 5, 1900, in Toronto of a stroke. Withrow Park in Toronto, created in 1910, was named for Withrow.
