= Westben =

Barn theatre in Ontario, Canada

Westben Performing Arts Theatre
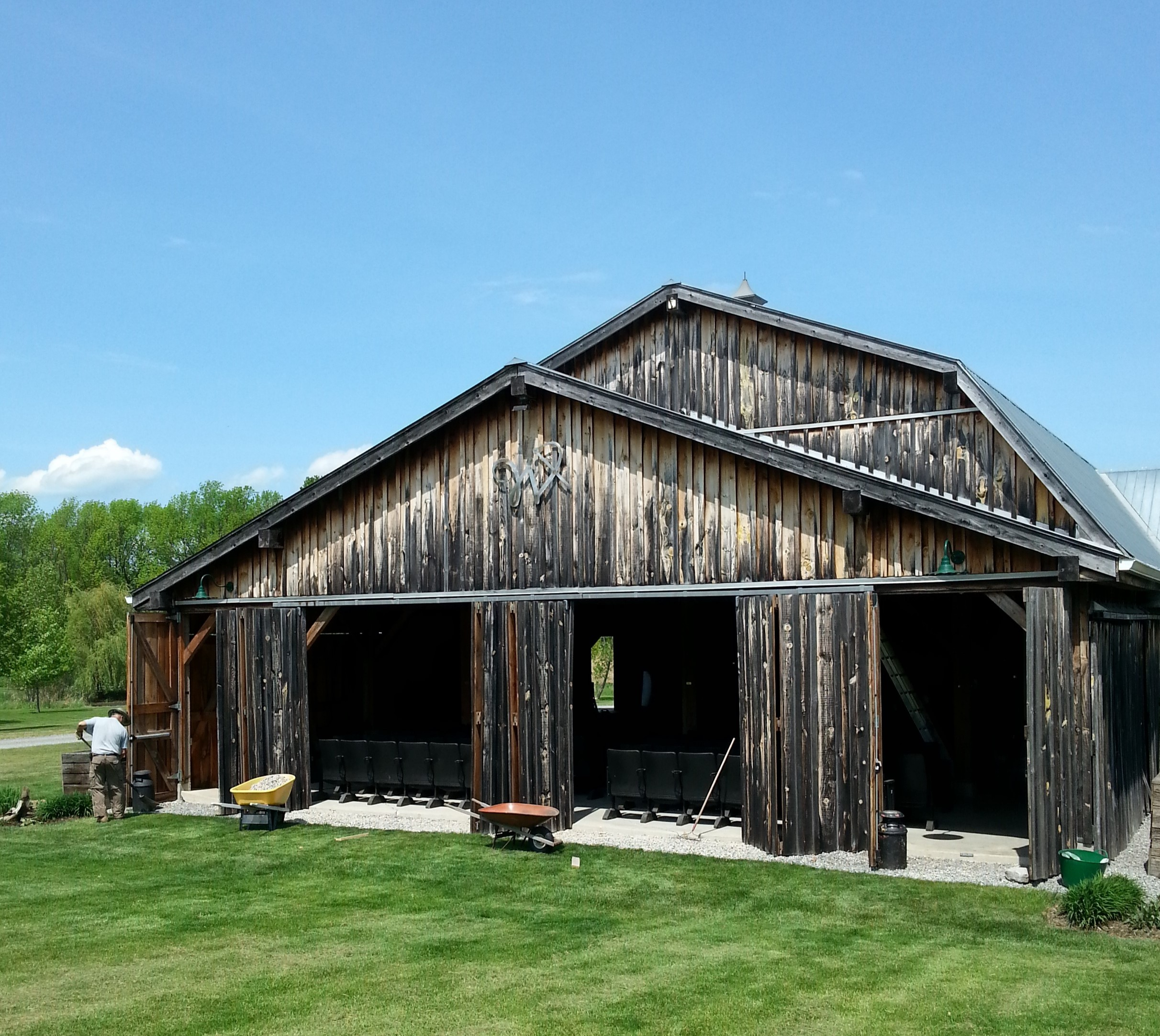
- The front of the Westben Theatre in 2016.
- Interactive map of Westben Performing Arts Theatre
- Former names: Westben Arts Festival Theatre (1999-2018)
- Address: 6698 County Road 30 North; Campbellford, Ontario; K0L 1L0
- Coordinates: 44°18′21.8″N 77°49′47.1″W
- Owner: Westben Centre for Connection & Creativity through Music
- Capacity: 400 plus additional outdoor seating

Construction
- Opened: 1 July 2000
- Architect: Didier Schvartz

Website
- Westben

Westben Performing Arts Theatre, commonly known as Westben, is a 400-seat barn theatre located in Campbellford, Ontario, midway between Toronto and Ottawa. It is operated by the nonprofit organization of the same name, and was constructed by Didier Schvartz of the Sunwood Company in 2000, opening on Canada Day of that same year. The barn is a located on 50 acres of rural farmland, and was constructed with an emphasis on the surrounding landscape.

== History ==
In 1989, after pursuing their individual music careers abroad, co-founders Donna Bennett and Brian Finley returned to Bennett's hometown of Campbellford, where they continued performing across North America. Inspired by performing in a barn for the Olympic Music Festival outside of Seattle, and after highly successful local runs of Jesus Christ Superstar and The Sound of Music, the two founded the nonprofit organization The Westben Arts Festival Theatre in 1999, and began planning to construct a venue.

Since the opening of the theatre in 2000, Westben has hosted an estimated 500 concerts featuring prominent Canadian and international artists, including Gerald Finley, the Canadian Brass, Colin Mochrie, Adrianne Pieczonka, and more.

In 2017, co-founders Donna Bennett and Brian Finley were appointed to the Order of Canada for their work with Westben and the local arts.

As of January 2018, Westben rebranded to the Westben Center for Connection & Creativity Through Music, changing from a seasonal event to now hosting concerts and events year-round.

== Facility ==
The theatre space was designed by Didier Schvartz, and was constructed by him with help from local construction companies and volunteers. The frame of the barn is constructed from timber, with front and side doors that slide open to reveal the surrounding landscape. In total, it seats 400, plus additional seating outside if needed. The property surrounding the barn includes a food and bar area, a natural amphitheater, and a parking lot.

Along with the main theatre space, Westben also hosts performances in Campbellford's Clock Tower Cultural Center, which formerly served as the box office, as well as at local restaurants, and in surrounding towns.

In March 2021 Westben moved their box office to an 1890s schoolhouse, which sits on a property adjacent to the barn theatre. This space will also serve as a performance center.
