= Northumberland North (Province of Canada electoral district) =

Province of Canada electoral district

Northumberland North Canada West
Province of Canada electoral district

Defunct pre-Confederation electoral district
- Legislature: Legislative Assembly of the Province of Canada
- District created: 1841
- District abolished: 1867
- First contested: 1841
- Last contested: 1863

Northumberland North was an electoral district of the Legislative Assembly of the Parliament of the Province of Canada, in Canada West (now Ontario). It was created in 1841, upon the establishment of the Province of Canada by the union of Upper Canada and Lower Canada. Northumberland North was represented by one member in the Legislative Assembly. It was abolished in 1867, upon the creation of Canada and the province of Ontario.

== Boundaries ==
Northumberland North electoral district was located north of Lake Ontario in the northern section of Northumberland County (now in Peterborough County). The town of Peterborough was the major centre.

The Union Act, 1840 had merged the two provinces of Upper Canada and Lower Canada into the Province of Canada, with a single Parliament. The separate parliaments of Lower Canada and Upper Canada were abolished. The Union Act provided that the pre-existing electoral boundaries of Upper Canada would continue to be used in the new Parliament, unless altered by the Union Act itself.

Northumberland North was a new electoral district, created by the Union Act as the north riding of Northumberland County. Northumberland County had originally been bounded by on the south by Lake Ontario and extended north, as described by a proclamation of the first Lieutenant Governor of Upper Canada, John Graves Simcoe, in 1792, and as further defined by a statute of Upper Canada in 1798.

Prior to the Act of Union, Northumberland County had been represented by two members in the Legislative Assembly of Upper Canada. The Union Act split Northumberland County into two separate ridings, Northumberland North and Northumberland South, each represented by one member. The boundaries for Northumberland North were:

... the North Riding of the last-mentioned County shall consist of the following Townships, namely, Monaghan, Otonabee, Asphodel, Smith, Douro, Dummer, Belmont, Methuen, Burleigh, Harvey, Emily, Gore, Ennismore;

== Members of the Legislative Assembly ==
Northumberland North was represented by one member in the Legislative Assembly. The following were the members for Northumberland North.

| Parliament | Years | Members | Party |
|---|---|---|---|
| 1st Parliament; 1841–1844 | 1841–1844 | John Gilchrist | Unionist; moderate Reformer |

== Abolition ==
Northumberland North electoral district was abolished on July 1, 1867, when the British North America Act, 1867 came into force, creating Canada and splitting the Province of Canada into Quebec and Ontario. It was succeeded by two electoral districts in the House of Commons of Canada, Peterborough East and Peterborourgh West, and two ridings of the same names in the Legislative Assembly of Ontario.
