= Percy Township =

Coordinates: 44°15′07″N 77°55′59″W

Percy, Ontario was a former incorporated township and now a geographic township located in Northumberland County, Ontario, Canada. It is currently part of the Municipality of Trent Hills.

The Township was named in 1798 for Lady Elizabeth Seymour, the wife of Hugh Percy, the first Duke of Northumberland. She later became the Baroness of Percy. Adjoining Seymour Township was given the Baroness' maiden name.

A settlement grew, and in 1872, the Village of Hastings was separated from Percy and incorporated as a separate municipality.

The community of Warkworth is located in Percy and was the administrative centre for the municipality.

Percy was originally part of the United Counties of Northumberland and Durham, then Northumberland after the United Counties were restructured in 1974. In 2001, Percy was amalgamated with Hastings, the Town of Campbellford and the Township of Seymour to form the Town of Campbellford / Seymour, Percy & Hastings. It was renamed Trent Hills later that year. According to the 2001 Census, Seymour had a population of 3,316 at the time of amalgamation.

== Populated places ==
Prior to amalgamation, communities in the Township of Percy included Brickley, Dartford, Godolphin, Hastings, Norham, South Hastings, Sunnybrae and Warkworth.

== See also ==
- List of townships in Ontario
