= Seymour Township =

Coordinates: 44°20′19″N 77°46′54″W

Seymour is a former incorporated township and now a geographic township located in Northumberland County, Ontario, Canada. It is currently part of the Municipality of Trent Hills.

European settlement began in earnest in the 1830s and brothers Lieutenant-Colonel Robert Campbell and Major Robert Campbell were granted 890 acres (360 ha) on the Trent River in 1831. A settlement grew, and in 1876, the Village of Campbellford was separated from Seymour and incorporated as a separate municipality.

Seymour was originally part of the United Counties of Northumberland and Durham, then Northumberland after the United Counties were restructured in 1974. In 2001, Seymour was amalgamated with Campbellford, the Village of Hastings and the Township of Percy to form the Town of Campbellford / Seymour, Percy & Hastings. It was renamed Trent Hills later that year. According to the 2001 Census, Seymour had a population of 4,528 at the time of amalgamation.

== Populated places ==
Prior to amalgamation, the Township of Seymour consisted of the following villages, hamlets & communities such as Burnbrae, Campbellford, Clarke's, Hardy Island, Healey Falls, Kellers, Menie, Meyersburg, Mount Pleasant, Nappan Island, Percy Boom, Pethericks Corners and Rylstone.

== See also ==
- List of townships in Ontario
