= Ferris Provincial Park =

Provincial park in Ontario, Canada

- IUCN category II (national park)
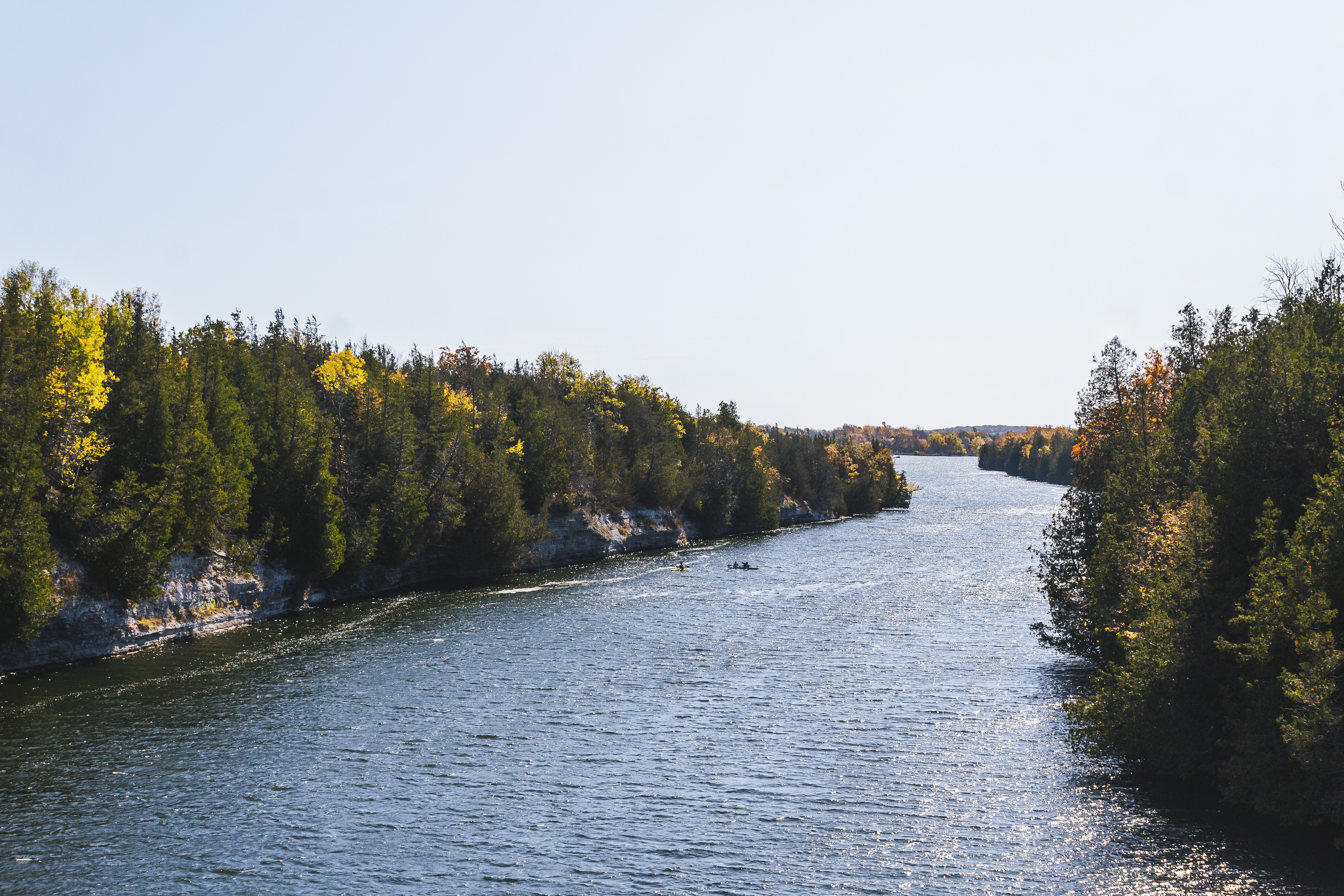
- A view of the park and the Trent River

- Location within Southern Ontario
- Interactive map of Ferris Provincial Park
- Location: Ontario, Canada
- Nearest city: Campbellford
- Coordinates: 44°17′31″N 77°47′38″W
- Area: 1.98 km^{2} (0.76 sq mi)
- Established: 1962
- Governing body: Ontario Parks

Ferris Provincial Park is a provincial park in northeastern Northumberland County in Ontario, Canada. The park occupies an area of 1.98 km^{2} (0.76 sq mi) next to the Trent River in Campbellford, Ontario. Within the park are 10 kilometres of hiking and mountain biking trails and a suspension bridge over Ranney Gorge. Two campground areas offer 163 sites for car camping (tents to trailers). The park has a boat launch facility available for launching into the Trent River.

The park's land was originally owned by James Marshall Ferris and his descendants. The province acquired the lands in 1960 (Cock farm section in 1969) and opened the provincial park in 1962.

The park was threatened by closure in 1994, but saved by efforts from the members of the local Rotary Club. The Ranney Gorge suspension bridge was built by the RCAF's 8 Wing at CFB Trenton from 2002 to 2004.
