= Campbellford =

- Unincorporated community
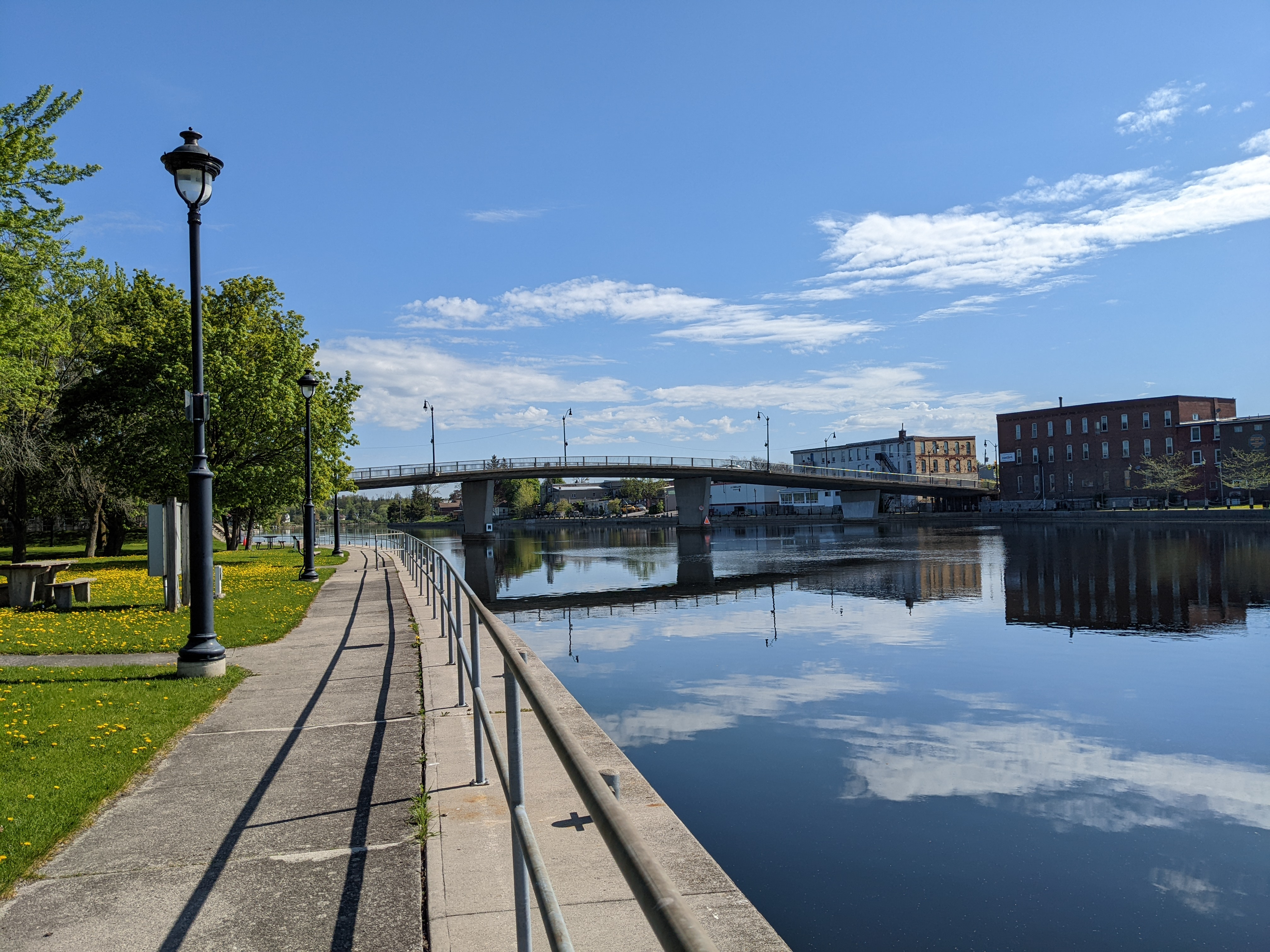
- Trent-Severn Waterway in Campbellford

- Location within Ontario
- Coordinates: 44°18′N 77°48′W
- Country: Canada
- Province: Ontario
- County: Northumberland
- Township municipality: Trent Hills
- Founded: 1834
- Incorporated: 1906
- Amalgamated: 2001

Government
  - Type: Unincorporated
  - Body: Trent Hills Municipal Council

Population (2021)
  - Total: 3,372
- Time zone: UTC-5 (Eastern Time Zone)
  - Summer (DST): UTC-4 (Eastern Time Zone)
- Postal code: K0L 1L0
- Area codes: 705, 249
- County roads: County Road 8; County Road 30; County Road 38; County Road 50
- Waterways: Trent River

Campbellford is an unincorporated place and former town in Northumberland County, Ontario, Canada, in the township municipality of Trent Hills. It lies approximately midway between Toronto and Ottawa. It is situated on both the Trent-Severn Waterway and the Trans Canada Trail. It can be reached from Highway 401 by exiting at Brighton (exit 509) and going north on County Road 30. It can also be reached from Highway 7 at the Havelock exit going south (also on County Road 30). Campbellford is surrounded by prime agricultural land which is home to many farms. In recent years, some of the town's agricultural sector has diversified into non-traditional areas such as bison farming, rare breeds farming and there are many horse farms in the area. The town has a farmers market that is open two days a week in the summer.

== History ==
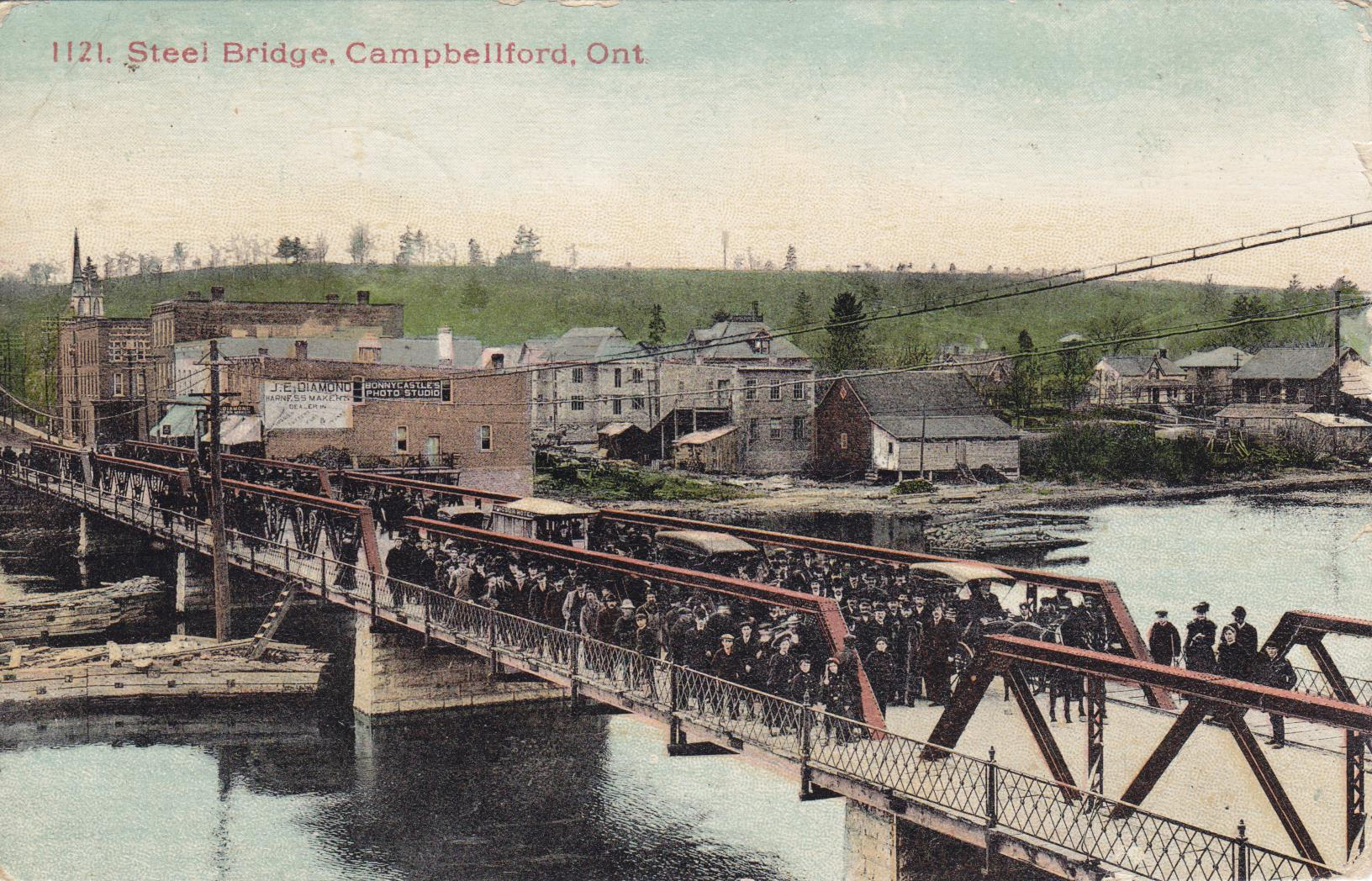
Steel Bridge, Campbellford (1910)

Campbellford traces its history back to 1834 when the first homesteaders arrived in the area. Once very wealthy, it is still known today for its many fine Victorian homes. Campbellford became a town in 1906 (Trent Hills Visitor Guide, 2009, p. 13). About 70 years earlier, "the British government gave two brothers, Lieutenant-Colonel Robert Campbell and Major David Campbell, 1800 acres of land to settle in an area named for the Duke of Northumberland's wife Lady Elizabeth Seymour" (Trent Hills Visitors Guide, 2009, p. 13). The Trent River (long before it became a canal) meandered through the Campbell property and, not far from the current town centre, the river was shallow enough for crossing. The river crossing came to be known as "Campbell's Ford." In 1876 the Village of Campbellford was created and then became a town in 1906. Its centennial was celebrated in 2006. In 2001, Campbellford, Hastings and Warkworth amalgamated to form the Municipality of Trent Hills.

== Local information ==
Campbellford Memorial Hospital is the largest employer in the community, and the only hospital located between Belleville and Peterborough. It is a teaching practice affiliated with the University of Toronto Faculty of Medicine.

In the summer, Campbellford's population swells with tourists taking advantage of the local lakes and waterways, trails, and camping areas. In the winter, snowmobiling is a popular attraction. Ferris Provincial Park is located on the Trent River a short distance south of Campbellford.

Campbellford is a stop on the Trent-Severn Waterway, an important inland water transportation network, and is situated between the Ranney Falls Flight Lock (Locks 11 and 12) and the Campbellford Lock (13) of this system.

Campbellford is home to the radio station CKOL-FM.

The town has a 27 ft (8.2 m) high statue of a toonie, which was designed by local artist Brent Townsend.

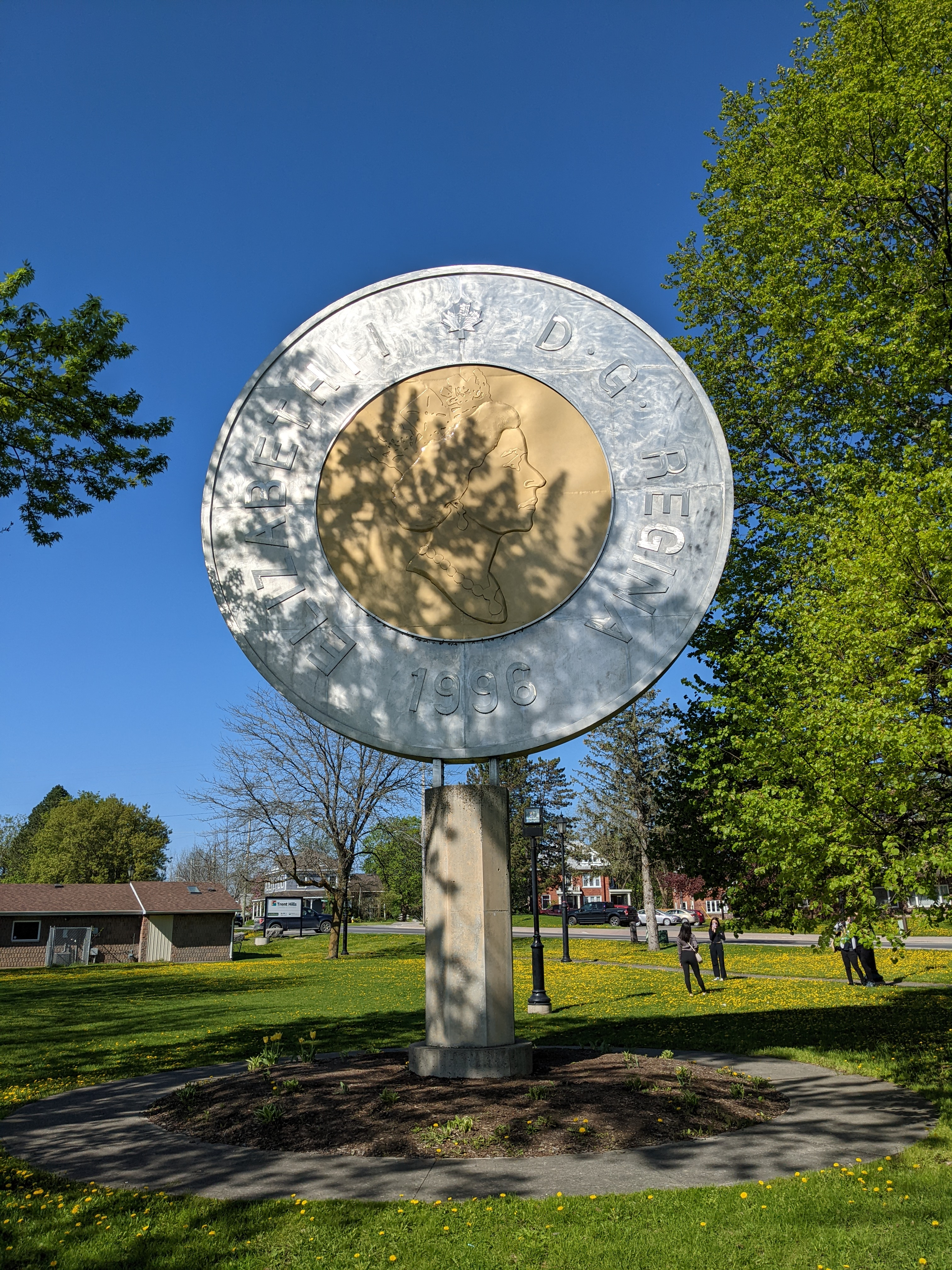
The obverse side of the Giant Toonie Monument.

== Notable residents ==
- Escott Reid (1905–1999), Canadian diplomat and Order of Canada recipient
- W. F. Taylor (1877–1945), founding president of the Canadian Amateur Hockey Association

== Gallery ==
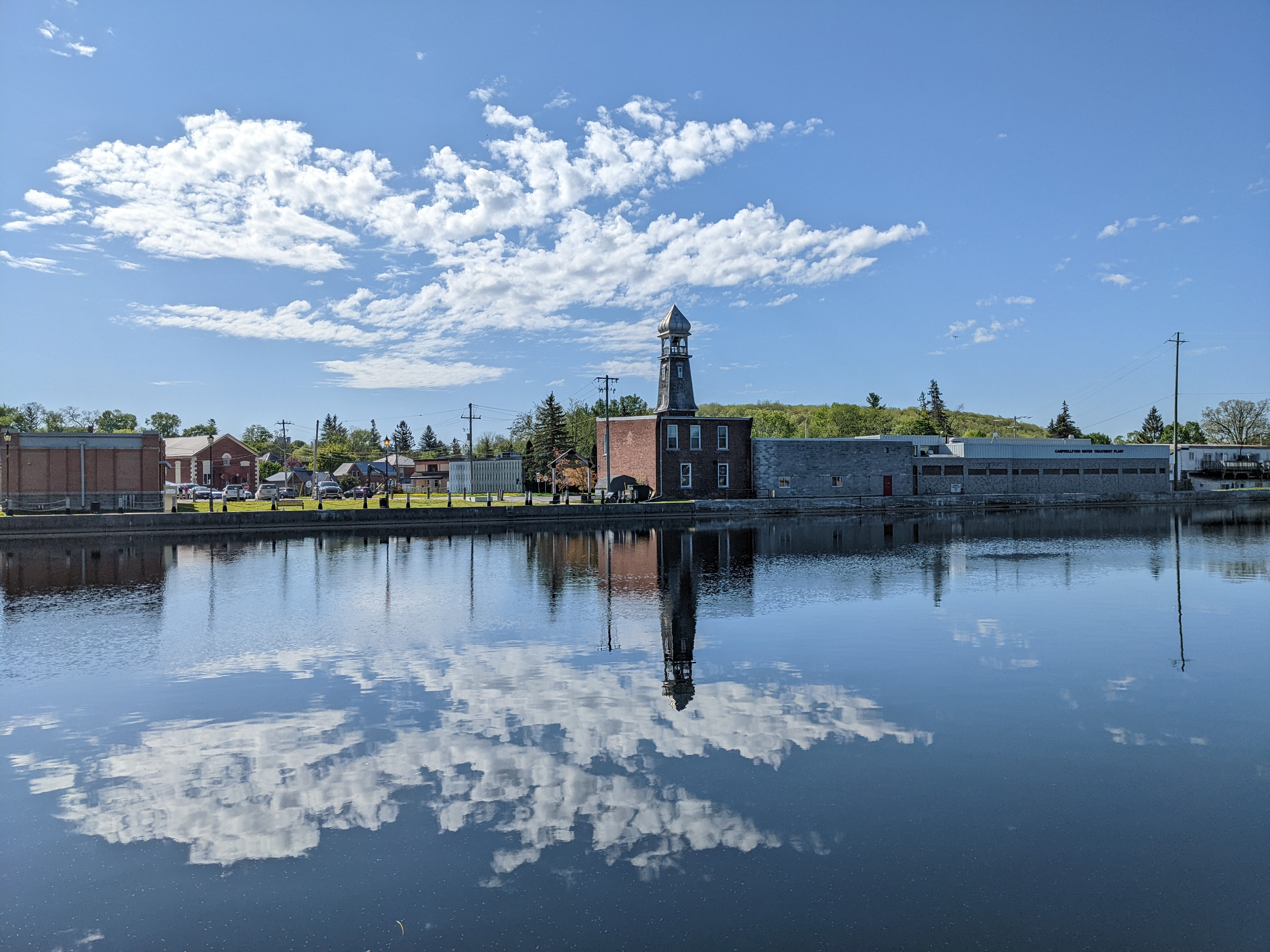
The Trent River passing through Campbellford, Ontario.

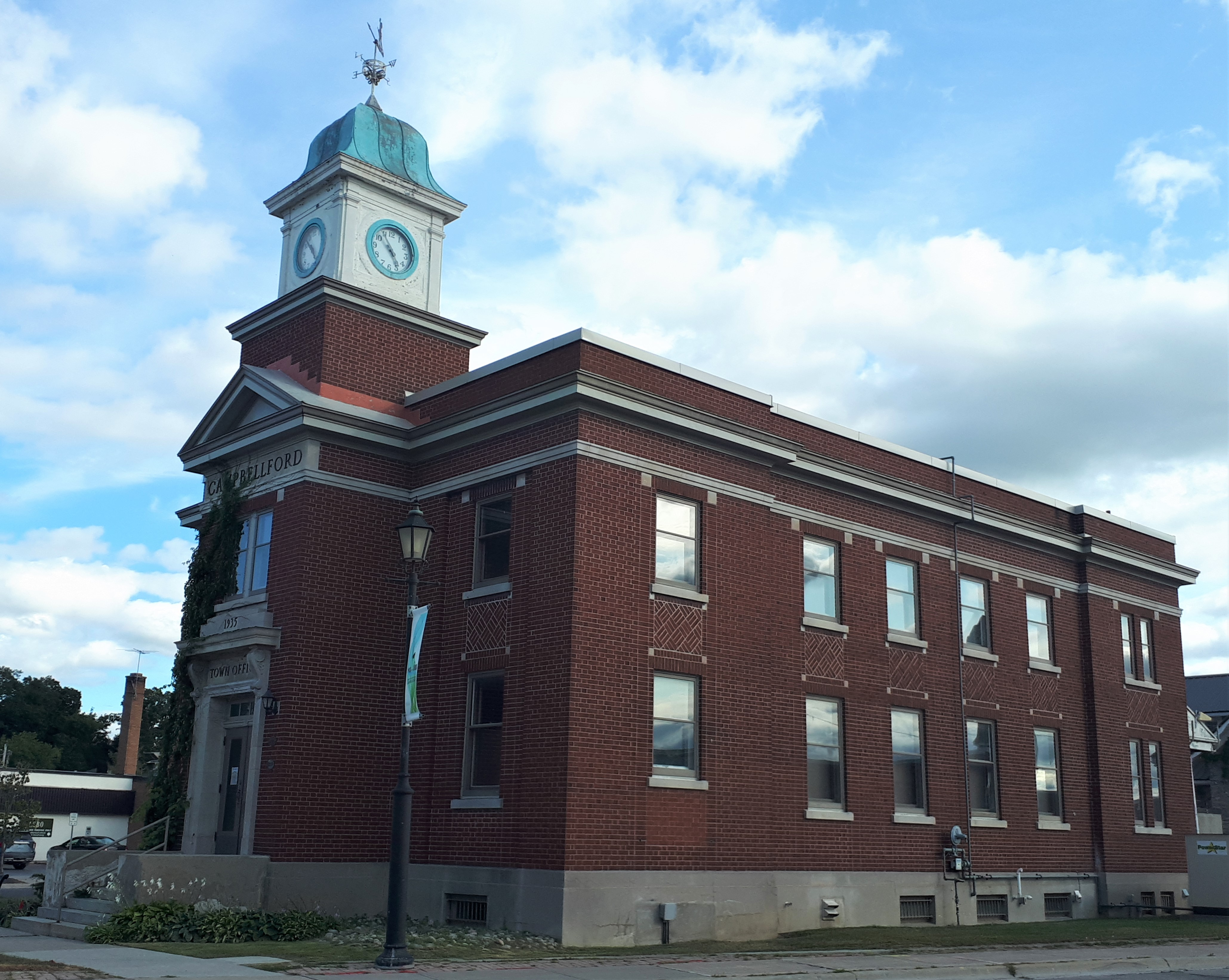
Campbellford Town Office
