= Warkworth, Ontario =

Warkworth
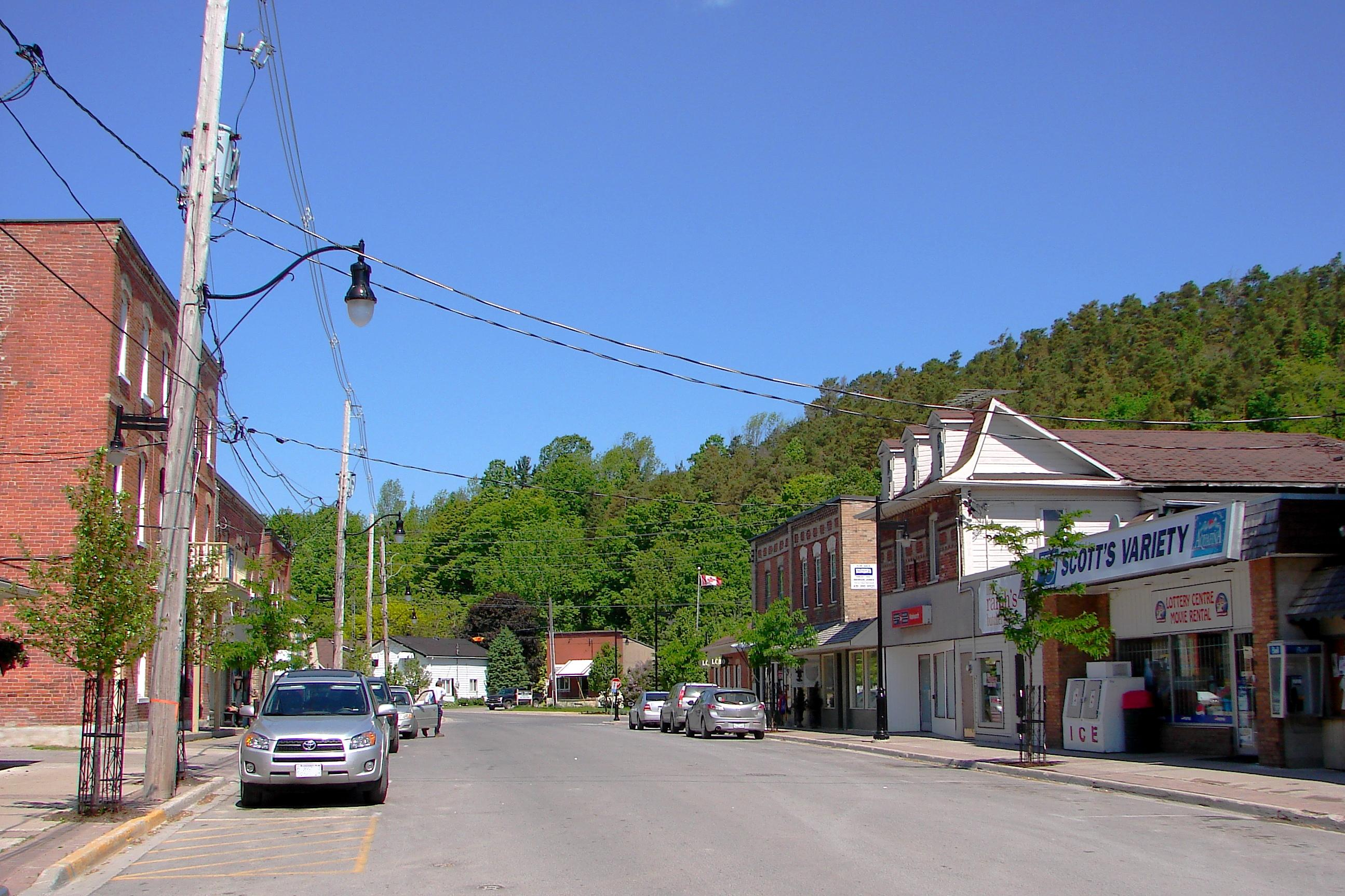
- Warkworth main street
- Etymology: Named after Warkworth, Northumberland
- Location of Warkworth in Southern Ontario
- Coordinates: 44°12′02″N 77°53′19″W
- Country: Canada
- Province: Ontario
- County: Northumberland County
- Municipality: Trent Hills
- Incorporated: 1857
- Elevation: 137 m (449 ft)
- Time zone: UTC-5 (Eastern Time Zone)
  - Summer (DST): UTC-4 (Eastern Time Zone)
- Postal code: K0K 3K0
- Area codes: 705, 249

Warkworth is a community in the municipality of Trent Hills, Northumberland in Central Ontario, Canada. Originally known as Percy Mills (1851 Census), the village of Warkworth was incorporated in 1857, and became part of Trent Hills when the latter was formed in 2001. Warkworth is named after Warkworth, Northumberland.

== Geography ==
Burnley Creek flows through the town.

== Facilities/services ==
The village features the historic Town Hall, now the Centre for the Arts. The village has Percy Centennial Public School, a community nursing home, medical centre and a seniors' residence. The town rink is also a primary centre of social interaction, historically serving hockey, (capturing 11 Provincial titles, most recently in 1993–1994) and ringette players as well as curlers. The village has a vital cultural life of live theatre and music and is home to many accomplished artists, and artisans. A historical plaque honouring local artist J.D. Kelly is located just outside the village centre.

A medium-security federal penitentiary, the Warkworth Institution, is located 8 km east of the village, in Brighton township. The prison opened in 1967 and is a major contributor to the local economies of both Brighton township and Northumberland county. The penitentiary employs approximately 320 people from the surrounding areas, along with providing yearly grants to both Brighton and Northumberland county.

== Events ==
Warkworth hosts many events, including the annual Maple Syrup Festival in March, the Perfect Pie Contest in November, Lilac Festival in May, the Percy Agricultural Fall Fair in September, the Donnybrook auction in June, studio, house and garden tours, Junk in the Trunk and Warkworth Music Fest in July, Eat in the Park in August, and Warkworth under the Stars in December.

The Warkworth hockey team has won 11 provincial titles, most recently in 1993–1994.

== Notable people ==
- Derek Lynch, race car driver
- Tom McCamus, actor
- Sacha, country music singer

== Twin city ==
- Warkworth, New Zealand
