= Trent Hills =

- Municipality (lower-tier)
- Municipality of Trent Hills
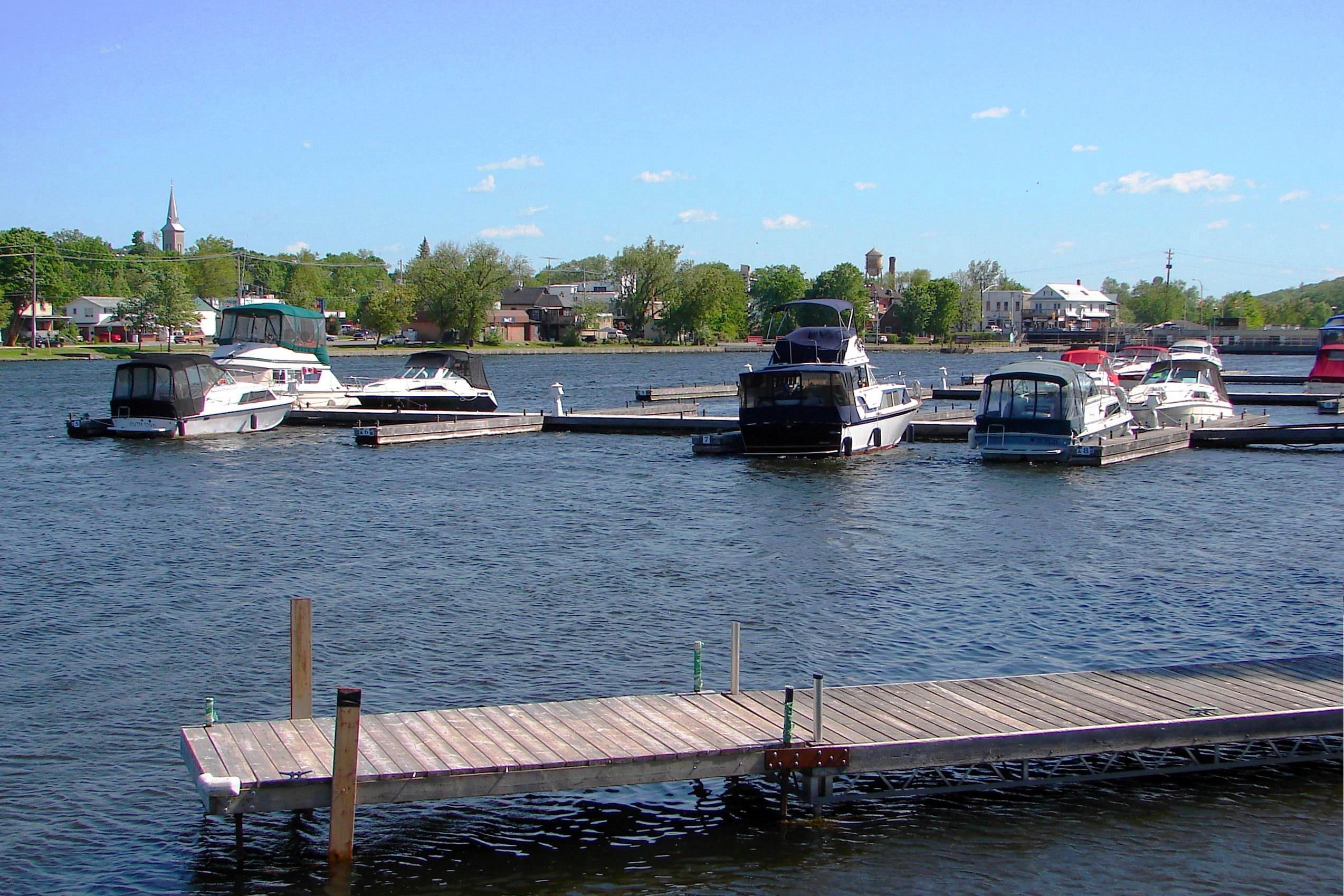
- Hastings as seen across the Trent-Severn Waterway
- Interactive map of Trent Hills
- Location within Northumberland County Location within Southern Ontario
- Coordinates: 44°18′51″N 77°51′05″W
- Country: Canada
- Province: Ontario
- County: Northumberland
- Established: 2001

Government
  - Mayor: Bob Crate
  - Governing Body: Trent Hills Municipal Council
  - Federal riding: Northumberland—Clarke
  - Prov. riding: Northumberland—Peterborough South

Area
  - Land: 513.85 km^{2} (198.40 sq mi)

Population (2021)
  - Total: 13,861
  - Density: 27/km^{2} (70/sq mi)
- Time zone: UTC-5 (EST)
  - Summer (DST): UTC-4 (EDT)
- Postal code: K0L, K0K
- Area codes: 705, 249
- Website: www.trenthills.ca

The Municipality of Trent Hills is a municipality in Northumberland County in Central Ontario, Canada. It is on the Trent River and was created in 2001 through the amalgamation of the municipalities of Campbellford/Seymour, Percy Township, and Hastings Village. Thereafter it was known briefly as Campbellford/Seymour, Percy, Hastings.

== Communities ==
The municipality was historically four separate administrative subdivisions: the former town of Campbellford; the former village of Hastings; Seymour Township; and Percy Township. The latter two retain the status of geographic townships.

There are three main population centres in Trent Hills: Campbellford; Hastings; and the former village of Warkworth, formerly the municipal seat of Percy Township prior to the amalgamation of Trent Hills. Smaller communities within the municipality include:

- Allan Mills
- Brickley
- Burnbrae
- Connellys
- Crowe Bridge
- Dartford
- English Line
- Godolphin
- Green Acres
- Healey Falls
- Hoards Station
- Kellers
- Menie
- Meyersburg
- Norham
- Percy Boom
- Pethericks Corners
- Stanwood
- Sunnybrae
- Trent River
- West Corners
- Westview
- Woodland

== Demographics ==
In the 2021 Census of Population conducted by Statistics Canada, Trent Hills had a population of 13,861 living in 5,903 of its 7,057 total private dwellings, a change of 7.4% from its 2016 population of 12,900. With a land area of 513.85 km^{2} (198.40 sq mi), it had a population density of 27.0/km^{2} (69.9/sq mi) in 2021.

Canada census – Trent Hills community profile

| | 2021 | 2016 | 2011 |
| Population | 13,861 (+7.4% from 2016) | 12,900 (2.3% from 2011) | 12,604 (2.9% from 2006) |
| Land area | 513.85 km^{2} (198.40 sq mi) | 511.95 km^{2} (197.67 sq mi) | 511.90 km^{2} (197.65 sq mi) |
| Population density | 27.0/km^{2} (70/sq mi) | 25.2/km^{2} (65/sq mi) | 24.6/km^{2} (64/sq mi) |
| Median age | 55.2 (M: 54.4, F: 55.6) | 53.5 (M: 52.9, F: 53.9) | 51.0 (M: 50.6, F: 51.4) |
| Private dwellings | 7,057 (total) 5,903 (occupied) | 6883 (total) | 6613 (total) |
| Median household income | $73,000 |

References: 2021 2016 2011

Historical census populations – Trent Hills

| Year | Pop. | ±% |
|---|---|---|
| 1996 | 12,437 | — |
| 2001 | 12,569 | +1.1% |
| 2006 | 12,247 | −2.6% |

| Year | Pop. | ±% |
|---|---|---|
| 2011 | 12,604 | +2.9% |
| 2016 | 12,900 | +2.3% |
| 2021 | 13,861 | +7.4% |

Source: Statistics Canada

Mother tongue (2021):

- English as first language: 93.8%
- French as first language: 1.2%
- English and French as first language: 0.3%
- Other as first language: 4.2%

== Government ==
The chart below shows the structure of the municipal government of Trent Hills. These politicians were elected as of the 2014 municipal election. Following the death of Hector Macmillan who had served as an elected official from 2003 until 2017, deputy mayor Bob Crate was elected mayor and Rosemary Kelleher-MacLennan deputy mayor by council.

A Ward Boundary and Council Composition Review was carried out in 2020. The Review established 5 wards based on geographic regions instead of the original communities that now form Trent Hills, with each ward having a single councillor. This also established the position of Deputy Mayor as a separate position. The 2022 municipal election was the first to use these new ward configurations.

| Mayor | Deputy Mayor | Ward 1 – North Seymour | Ward 2 – South Seymour | Ward 3 – Cambpellford | Ward 4 - Percy | Ward 5 - Hastings |
|---|---|---|---|---|---|---|
| Robert (Bob) Crate | Mike Metcalf | Gene Brahaney | Rob Pope | Daniel Giddings | Rick English | Dennis Savery |

The results of past municipal elections are available on the municipality's website.

The Member of Parliament for the riding of Northumberland—Peterborough South is Philip Lawrence of the Conservative Party of Canada.

The Member of Provincial Parliament for Northumberland—Peterborough South (provincial electoral district) is David Piccini of the Progressive Conservative Party of Ontario.

== See also ==
- List of townships in Ontario
