= Northumberland County, Ontario =

County in Ontario, Canada

Northumberland County
- County (upper-tier)
- County of Northumberland
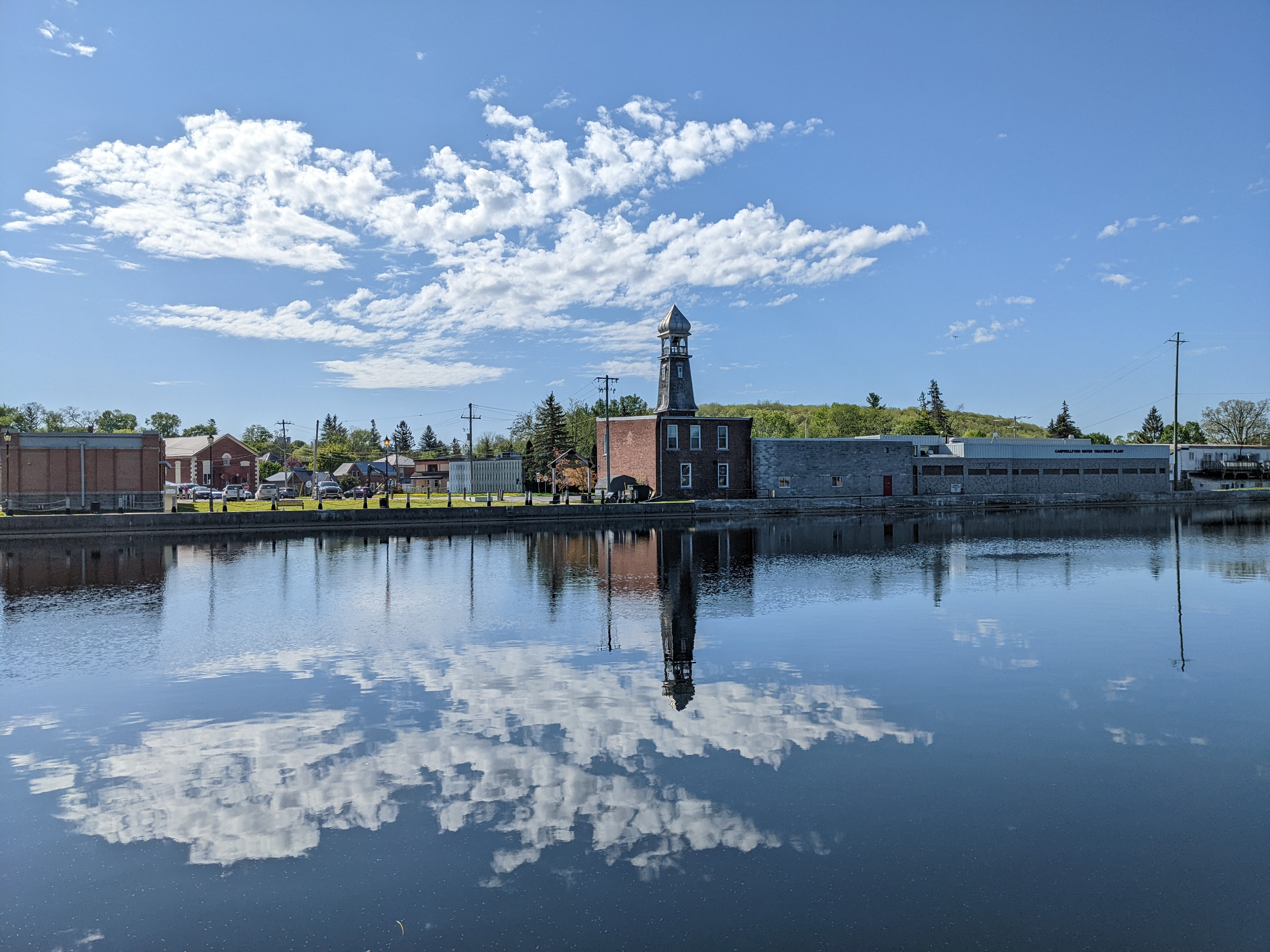
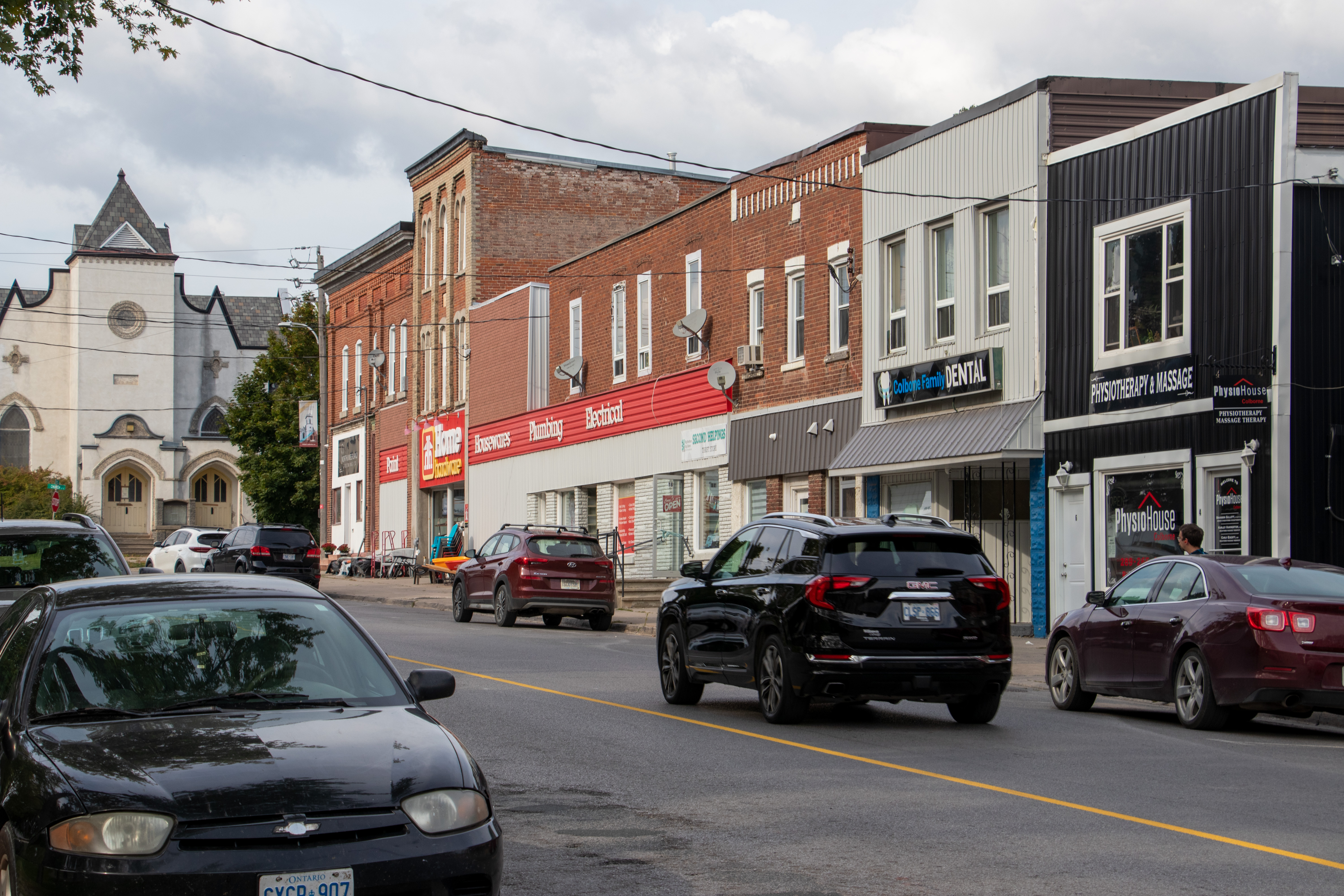
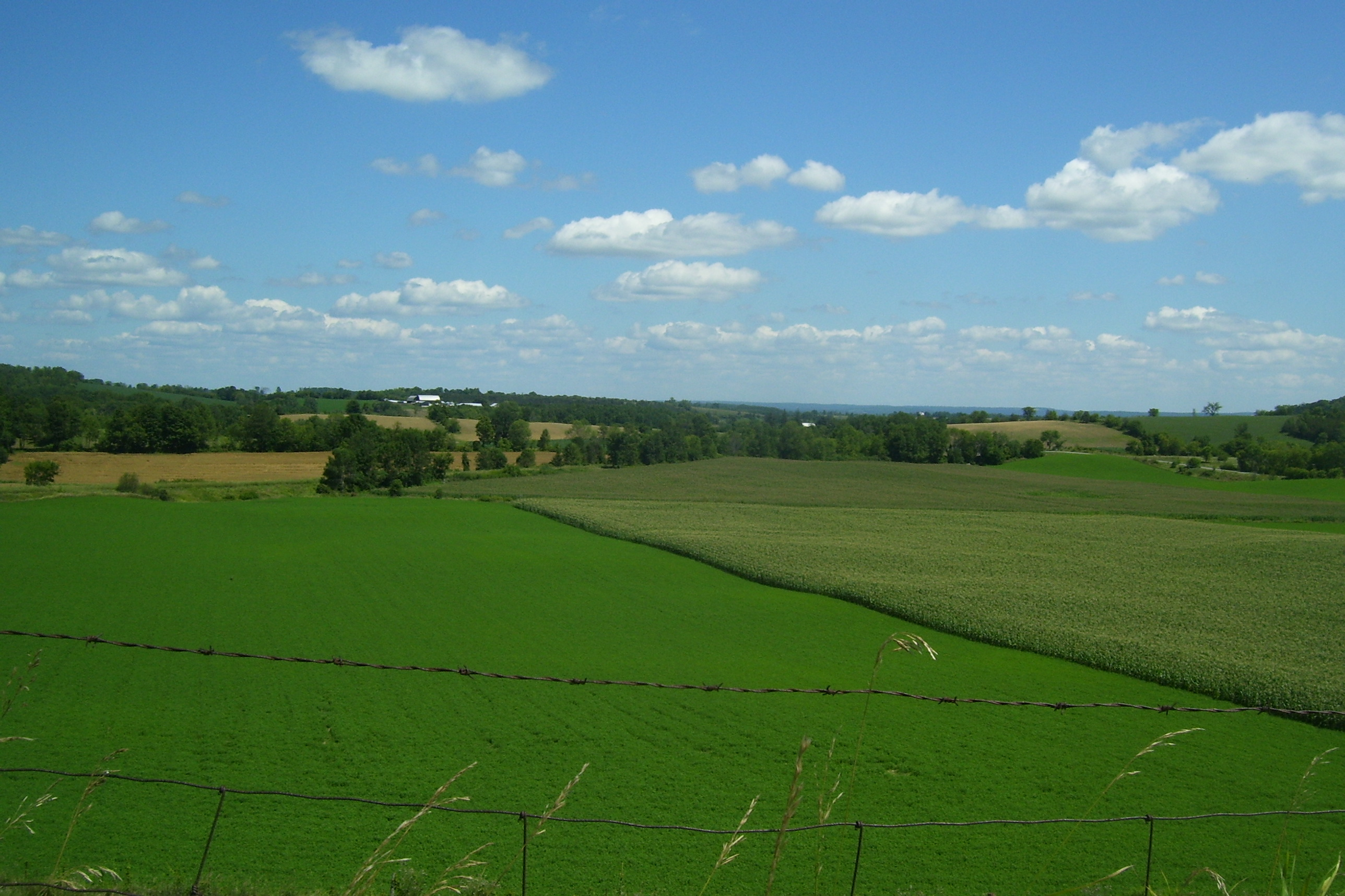
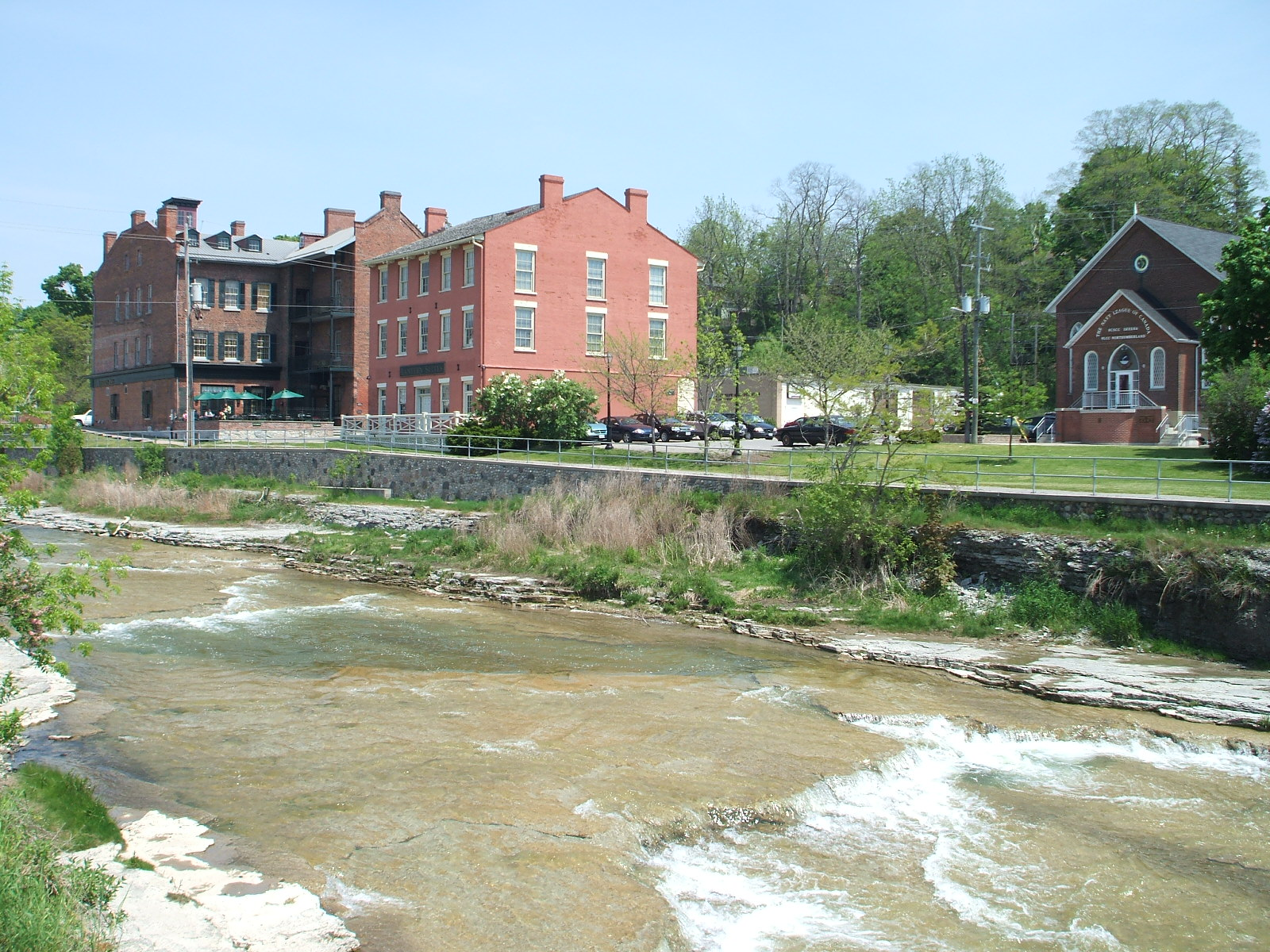
- Clockwise from top: Downtown Campbellford from the Trent River, farmland in the Municipality of Trent Hills, downtown Port Hope from the Ganaraska River, downtown Colborne.
- Motto(s): STRENGTH, HONOUR, AND BEAUTY

- Location of Northumberland County within Ontario
- Coordinates: 44°07′N 78°02′W
- Country: Canada
- Province: Ontario
- County seat: Cobourg
- Municipalities: List: Municipality of Brighton; Town of Cobourg; Municipality of Port Hope; Municipality of Trent Hills; Township of Alnwick/Haldimand; Township of Cramahe; Township of Hamilton

Government
  - Type: Upper-tier municipality (county)
  - Warden: Mandy Martin
  - Governing body: Northumberland County Council

Area
  - Total: 1,907.40 km^{2} (736.45 sq mi)

Population (2021)
  - Total: 89,365
  - Density: 46.9/km^{2} (121/sq mi)
- Time zone: UTC−05:00 (EST)
  - Summer (DST): UTC−05:00 (EDT)
- Website: northumberland.ca

Northumberland County is a county situated on the north shore of Lake Ontario, east of Toronto in Central Ontario, Canada. The Northumberland County headquarters are located in Cobourg.

== Municipalities ==
Northumberland County consists of seven municipalities:

Municipality	Population (2021)	Area (km²)	Population density (per km²)	Major population centres
Town of Cobourg	20,519	22.41	915.7	
Municipality of Port Hope	17,294	278.8	62.0	Port Hope
Municipality of Trent Hills	13,861	513.85	27.0	Campbellford, Warkworth, Hastings
Municipality of Brighton	12,108	223.24	54.2	Brighton
Township of Hamilton	11,059	256.03	43.2	
Township of Alnwick/Haldimand	7,473	398.25	18.8	Roseneath
Township of Cramahe	6,509	202.22	32.2	Colborne

The Alderville First Nation is geographically located within the County and is a part of the Northumberland census division, but, as an Indian reserve, it is independent of county administration.

== History ==
The County was first established in 1792, and was organized alongside neighbouring Durham County into the Newcastle District of Upper Canada in 1802. The County was initially settled by a mix of Irish, Scottish, and English immigrants, as well as by Americans immigrating north from New England.

In 1850, the Newcastle District was reorganized into the United Counties of Northumberland and Durham, an arrangement which lasted until 1973. Effective January 1, 1974, the majority of Durham County was amalgamated with Ontario County to create the Regional Municipality of Durham. The Township of Hope and the Town of Port Hope were transferred to Northumberland, which reverted to a standalone county.

== Demographics ==
As a census division in the 2021 Census of Population conducted by Statistics Canada, Northumberland County had a population of 89,365 living in 37,328 of its 40,638 total private dwellings, a change of 4.4% from its 2016 population of 85,598. With a land area of 1,907.4 km^{2} (736.5 sq mi), it had a population density of 46.9/km^{2} (121.3/sq mi) in 2021.

Canada census – Northumberland County community profile

	2021	2016	2011
Population	89,365 (+4.4% from 2016)	85,598 (4.2% from 2011)	82,126 (1.4% from 2006)
Land area	1,907.40 km^{2} (736.45 sq mi)	1,905.15 km^{2} (735.58 sq mi)	1,905.34 km^{2} (735.66 sq mi)
Population density	46.9/km^{2} (121/sq mi)	44.9/km^{2} (116/sq mi)	43.1/km^{2} (112/sq mi)
Median age	52.4 (M: 50.8, F: 54)	51.4 (M: 50.3, F: 52.4)
Private dwellings	40,638 (total) 37,328 (occupied)	39,032 (total) 35,686 (occupied)	37,226 (total)
Median household income	$84,000	$70,208

References: 2021 2016 2011

Historical census populations – Northumberland County

Year	Pop.	±%
1976	64,441	—
1981	64,966	+0.8%
1986	67,704	+4.2%
1991	78,224	+15.5%
1996	81,792	+4.6%

Year	Pop.	±%
2001	77,497	−5.3%
2006	80,963	+4.5%
2011	82,126	+1.4%
2016	85,598	+4.2%
2021	89,365	+4.4%

Population counts are not adjusted for boundary changes.
Source: Statistics Canada

Panethnic groups in Northumberland County (2001−2021)
Panethnic group	2021		2016		2011		2006		2001	
Panethnic group	Pop.	%	Pop.	%	Pop.	%	Pop.	%	Pop.	%
European (Note: Statistic includes all persons that did not make up part of a visible minority or an indigenous identity.)	80,305	92.01%	78,215	93.82%	75,835	95.23%	75,710	95.75%	73,210	96.41%
Indigenous	3,095	3.55%	2,275	2.73%	1,885	2.37%	1,630	2.06%	1,420	1.87%
African	925	1.06%	835	1%	355	0.45%	380	0.48%	380	0.5%
East Asian (Note: Statistic includes total responses of "Chinese", "Korean", and "Japanese" under visible minority section on census.)	810	0.93%	690	0.83%	460	0.58%	495	0.63%	540	0.71%
South Asian	715	0.82%	495	0.59%	400	0.5%	310	0.39%	100	0.13%
Southeast Asian (Note: Statistic includes total responses of "Filipino" and "Southeast Asian" under visible minority section on census.)	545	0.62%	320	0.38%	250	0.31%	195	0.25%	65	0.09%
Latin American	245	0.28%	200	0.24%	150	0.19%	105	0.13%	85	0.11%
Middle Eastern (Note: Statistic includes total responses of "West Asian" and "Arab" under visible minority section on census.)	240	0.27%	80	0.1%	85	0.11%	95	0.12%	65	0.09%
Other (Note: Statistic includes total responses of "Visible minority, n.i.e." and "Multiple visible minorities" under visible minority section on census.)	400	0.46%	250	0.3%	210	0.26%	145	0.18%	65	0.09%
Total responses	87,280	97.67%	83,365	97.39%	79,635	96.97%	79,070	97.66%	75,940	97.99%
Total population	89,365	100%	85,598	100%	82,126	100%	80,963	100%	77,497	100%
Note: Totals greater than 100% due to multiple origin responses

== Recreation ==
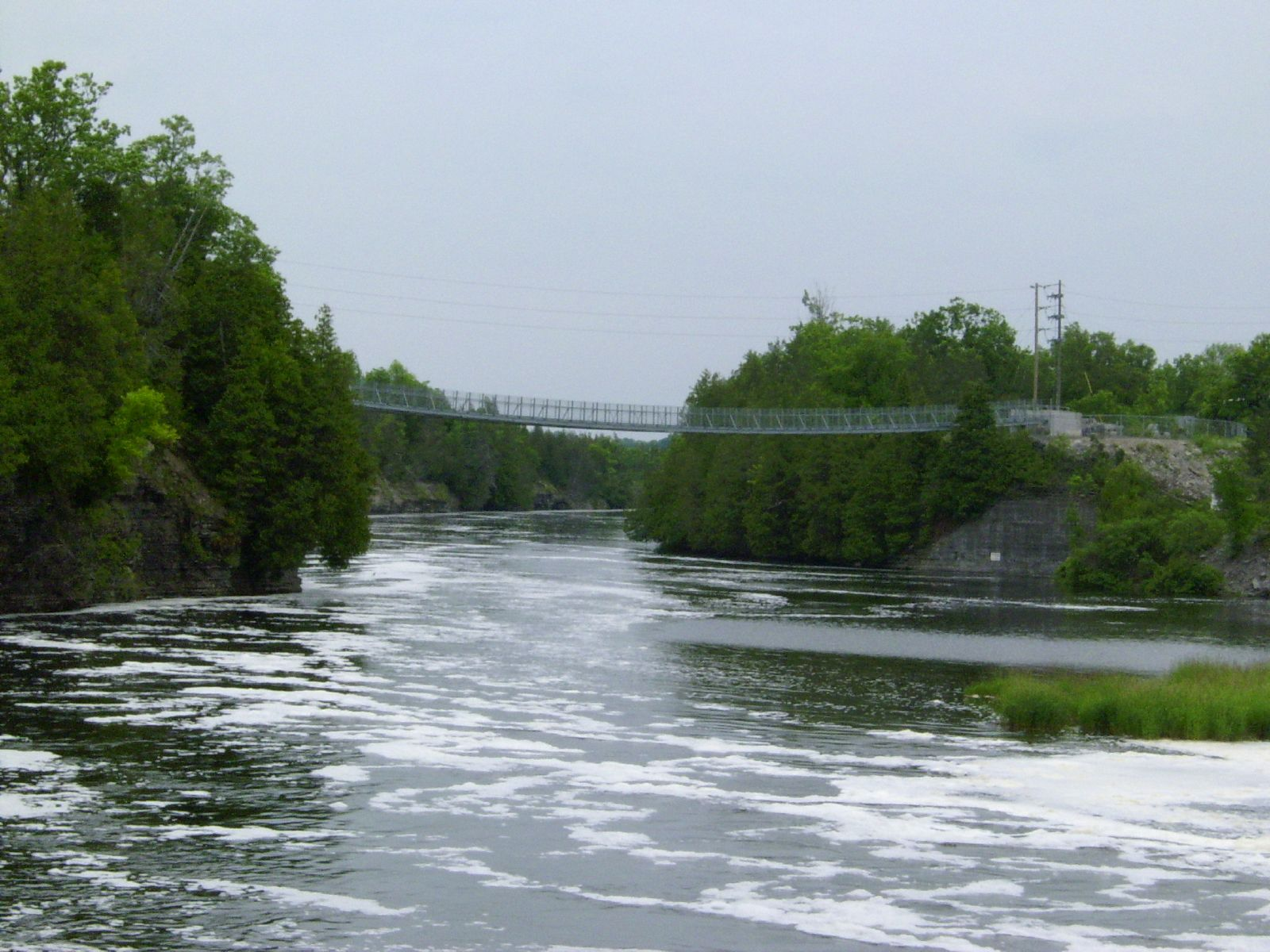
Ranney Suspension Bridge in Ferris Provincial Park

There are two provincial parks in Northumberland County: Presqu'ile Provincial Park in Brighton, and Ferris Provincial Park in Campbellford. There are also several other protected natural areas and forests, including Ganaraska Forest, Northumberland County Forest, Goodrich-Loomis Conservation Area, and Peter's Woods. Waterfront campsites and cottages are located along Lake Ontario and Rice Lake.

Northumberland County has various cycling, hiking and other outdoor trails. The Waterfront Trail along Lake Ontario passes through Northumberland County, as does the Trans-Canada Trail. The Northumberland portion of the Trans-Canada Trail spans from Hastings to Hoard's Station in Campbellford, following an abandoned rail line. Halfway through Campbellford, the trail joins the 6 km long Rotary Trail situated alongside the Trent River. There are five signed bike routes: Glorious Ganaraska, Rice Lake Ramble, Shelter Valley, Presqu’ile Promise and Trent River Truckin'. The Northumberland County Forest offers various trails available for hiking, cycling, horseback riding, ATVing, off-road motorcycling, cross-country skiing, snowmobiling, snowshoeing as well as a 3.2 km, accessible Universal Trail. The Ganaraska Hiking Trail starts in Port Hope and goes north to Queen Elizabeth II Wildlands Provincial Park, where it turns west and crosses Simcoe County, connecting to the Bruce Trail.

There are three theatres in Northumberland County: Westben in Campbellford, the Capitol Theatre in Port Hope, and the Park Theatre & Performing Arts Centre in Cobourg. Festivals in Northumberland include the Warkworth Maple Syrup and Float Your Fanny Down the Ganny festivals in early spring, the Cobourg Sandcastle Festival and Incredible Edibles Festival in the summer, and the Cultivate Food and Vintage Film Festivals in the fall.

== See also ==
- List of municipalities in Ontario
- List of townships in Ontario
- List of secondary schools in Ontario § Northumberland County
