= Dale, Ontario =

Dale
- Unincorporated community
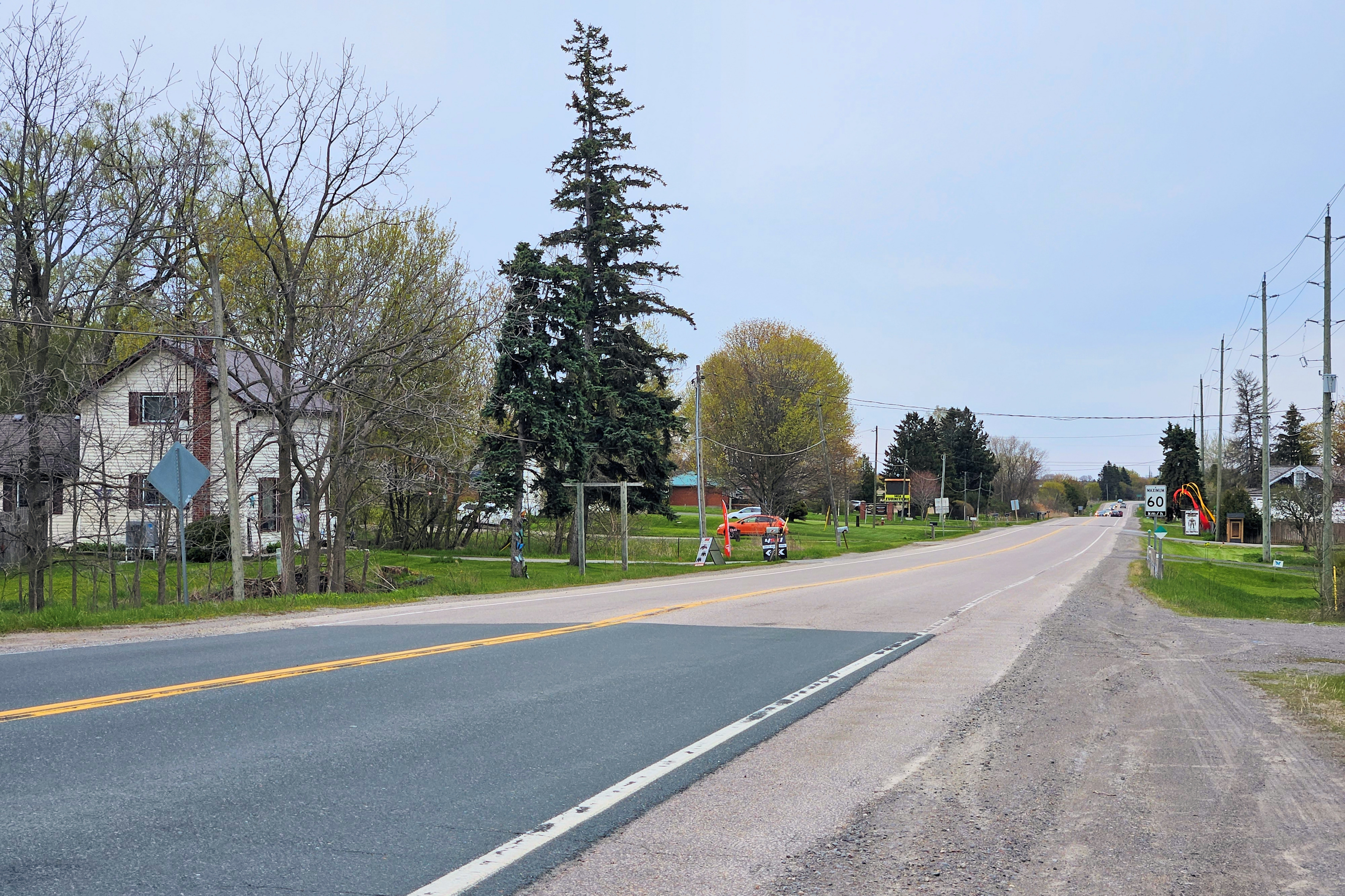

- Location within Southern Ontario
- Coordinates: 43°59′13″N 78°17′28″W
- Country: Canada
- Province: Ontario
- County: Northumberland
- Municipality: Port Hope
- Elevation: 113 m (371 ft)
- Time zone: UTC-5 (Eastern Time Zone)
  - Summer (DST): UTC-4 (Eastern Time Zone)
- Area codes: 905, 289, 365

Dale is a community in the municipality of Port Hope, Northumberland County, Ontario, Canada. It is located at the junction of county roads 28 (Ontario Street) and 74 (Dale Road); county road 28 leads south to interchange 464 on Ontario Highway 401, and further south to the town centre of Port Hope. The communities of Welcome, Davidson's Corners and Precious Corners are to the west, north and east respectively. The Ganaraska River flows on the west side of the community.

== See also ==
- List of communities in Ontario
