= Ganaraska Region =

Region of Ontario, Canada

Coordinates: 44°01′N 78°23′W

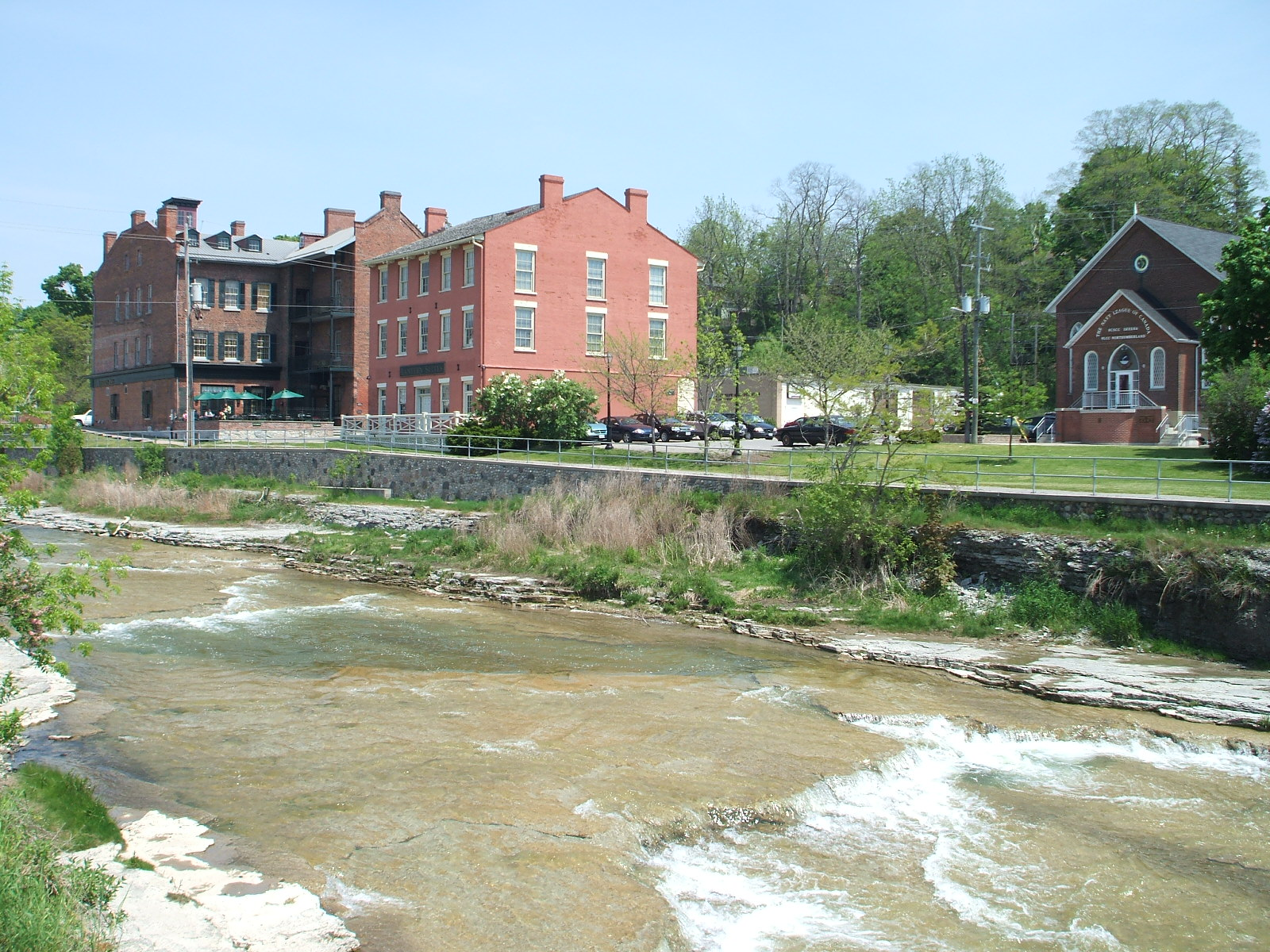
Ganaraska River at Port Hope

Ganaraska Region is a region located in Ontario, Canada, stretching along the shore of Lake Ontario for approximately 45 kilometres (28 mi) and about 15 kilometres (9.3 mi) wide. It covers an area of 700 square kilometres (270 sq mi) from Wilmot Creek in Clarington to east of Cobourg, and from the southern shore of Rice Lake south to Lake Ontario. This expansive area includes seven municipalities in whole or in part: Township of Cavan Monaghan, Town of Cobourg, Township of Alnwick/Haldimand, Township of Hamilton, Municipality of Port Hope, City of Kawartha Lakes, and the Municipality of Clarington. It is named after the Ganaraska River.

== Ganaraska Forest ==
The Ganaraska Forest is southern Ontario's largest continuous block of forest, consisting of 11,000 acres (45 km^{2}). It is located between Northumberland County, Peterborough County, the City of Kawartha Lakes, and the Regional Municipality of Durham.

== Ganaraska Hiking Trail ==
The Ganaraska Hiking Trail extends about 500 kilometres (310 mi) from Port Hope to Glen Huron in Simcoe County, where it connects to the Bruce Trail. It heads north through Lindsay and Fenelon Falls in the Kawartha Lakes region to reach the wilderness of Queen Elizabeth II Wildlands Provincial Park on the Canadian Shield. There it turns west, passing through Orillia, Midhurst and Angus and meeting the Bruce Trail at McKinney's Hill, Glen Huron. A northern spur trail branches off at Copeland Forest in Oro-Medonte and passes through the towns of Midland, Penetanguishene and Wasaga Beach on Georgian Bay before rejoining the main trail near its Glen Huron terminus. The first section of the trail between Port Hope and Lindsay was opened in 1968.
