= Zion, Northumberland County, Ontario =

Zion, Ontario
- Dispersed rural community
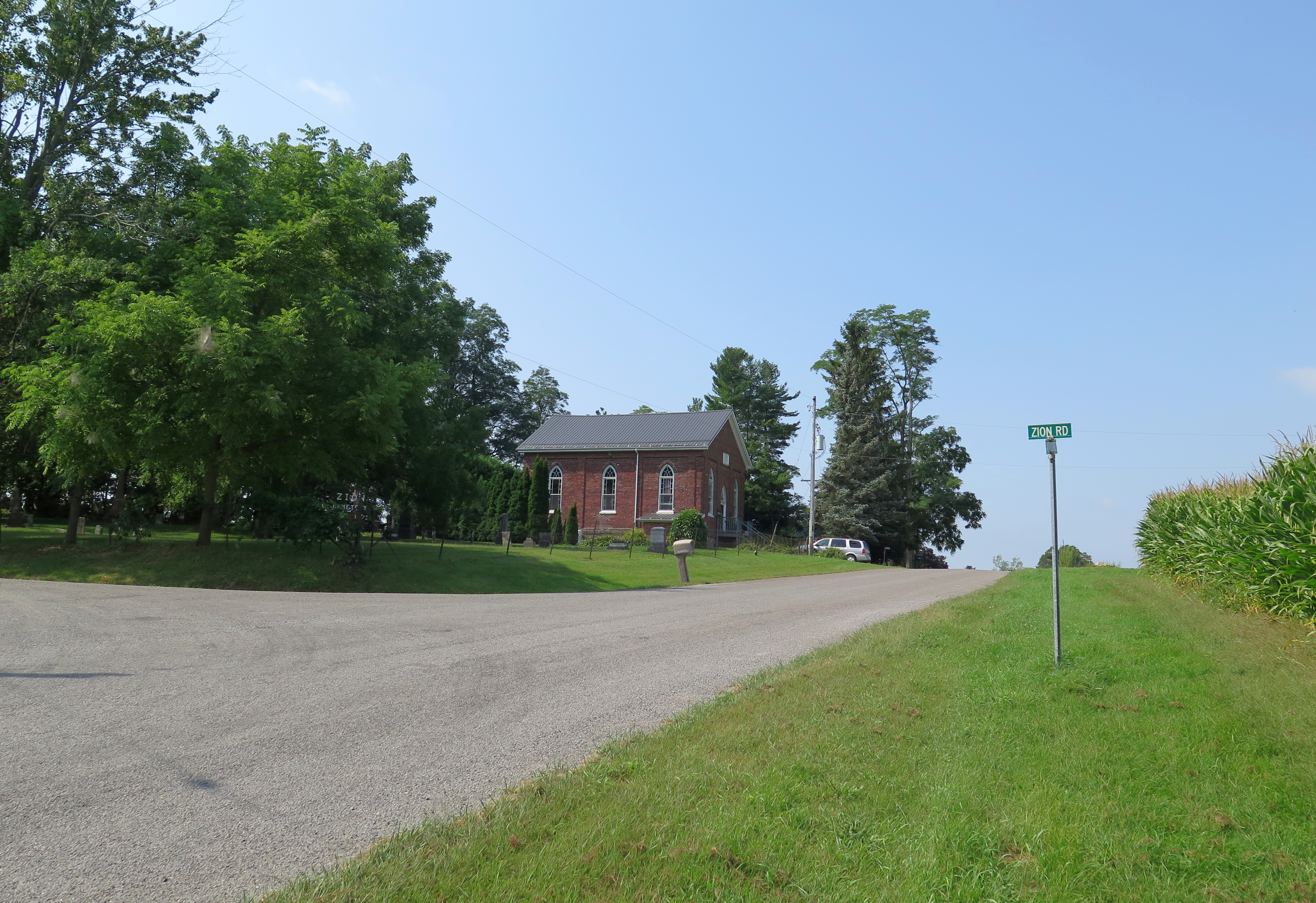
- Zion

- Location of Zion Zion, Ontario (Canada)
- Coordinates: 43°58′13″N 78°26′27″W
- Country: Canada
- Province: Ontario
- County: Northumberland
- Municipality: Port Hope
- Time zone: UTC-5 (Eastern (EST))
  - Summer (DST): UTC-4 (EDT)
- GNBC Code: FDGBT

Zion is a dispersed rural community in Port Hope, Northumberland County, Ontario, Canada.

== History ==
Prior to 1833, the Log School House in Zion served as a school and church, and nearby Dickenson's Field was a cemetery. A brick church called Zion Church was erected in 1839, with a basement for Sunday school classes, and a new cemetery next to the church. The church was renamed Zion United Church in 1925.

Zion had a post office from 1874 to 1916.

In 1890, Zion had a butcher, blacksmith, and public school. Residents received daily mail, and there was a daily stage coach to Port Hope. The population was 70.
