= Capitol Theatre (Port Hope) =

Theatre in Port Hope, Ontario, Canada

Coordinates: 43.95099°N 78.2931°W

- Cameco Capitol Arts Centre
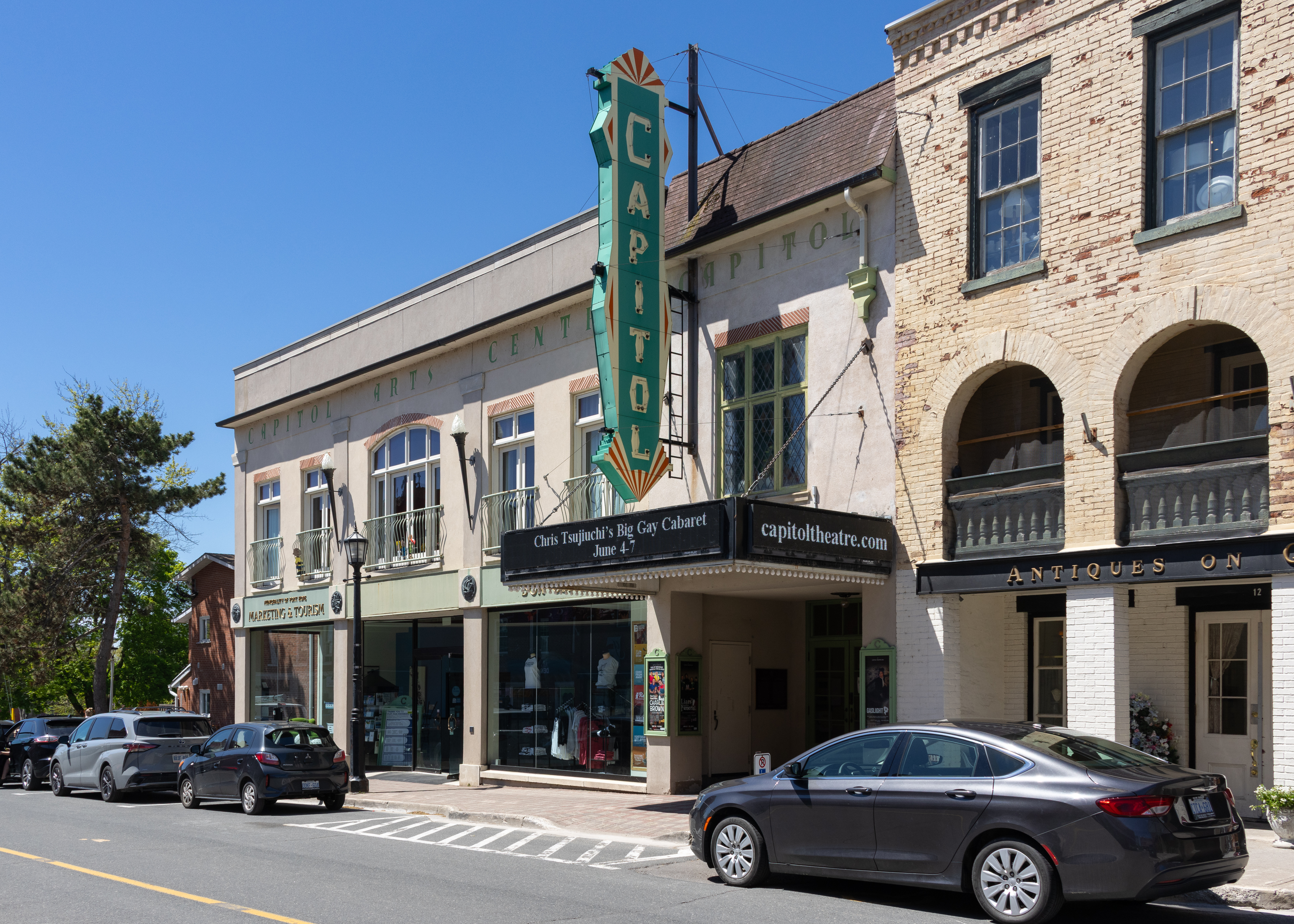
- Front of the Capitol Theatre in 2026
- Interactive map of Capitol Theatre
- Address: 20 Queen Street; Port Hope, Ontario; L1A 2Y7
- Capacity: 380
- Designation: National Historic Site of Canada
- Current use: Live performances, concerts, film screenings

Construction
- Opened: August 15, 1930
- Years active: 1930–1987; 1995–present

Website
- https://capitoltheatre.com/

The Capitol Theatre is located in Port Hope, Ontario, and is one of the last fully restored atmospheric movie theatres still in operation in Canada. Now a National Historic Site and still used for performances, it was constructed in 1930, with an interior designed to resemble a walled medieval courtyard surrounded by a forest. It was one of the first cinemas in the country built expressly for talking pictures. It opened on Friday, August 15, 1930, screening Queen High starring Charlie Ruggles and Ginger Rogers.

== History ==
The Capitol Theatre, located at 20 Queen Street, Port Hope, Ontario, was built by Famous Players in 1930 following the closure of the Grand Opera House (Music Hall) the previous year. Famous Players was convinced that the project would be worth undertaking after the former Opera House manager, Stuart Smart, lobbied the company.

The theatre cost 60,000 dollars to build, the interior is styled to resemble a Norman Castle. On opening night the theatre was outfitted with 648 seats (later scaled back to 550).

The building itself was designed by the former President of the Ontario Association of Architects, Murray Brown, who oversaw the construction by Thomas Garnet and Sons, a local firm responsible for many landmarks of the area, including the 1927 addition to the Port Hope High School.

In 1945 the Capitol Theatre was sold to Premier theatres. Premier continued to operate the theatre until February 1987, when declining profits led to the decision to put the Capitol up for sale in 1986. The last movies to be shown were Assassination and Firewalker, following which the seats were removed due to it being one of the conditions of sale.

After the Friends of the Capitol Theatre failed to get off the ground in the late 1980s; In 1994, a small group of local citizens formed the Capitol Theatre Heritage Foundation, a not-for-profit group led by Rod Stewart. The group subsequently raised $1.6 million for the initial restoration of the Capitol Theatre. The foundation was also tasked with seeking heritage designation for the building.

Another $3 million was raised in 2002 for an expansion and further renovation. The construction phase of the project was completed by 2004-2005, when the new Cameco Capitol Arts Centre opened to the public.

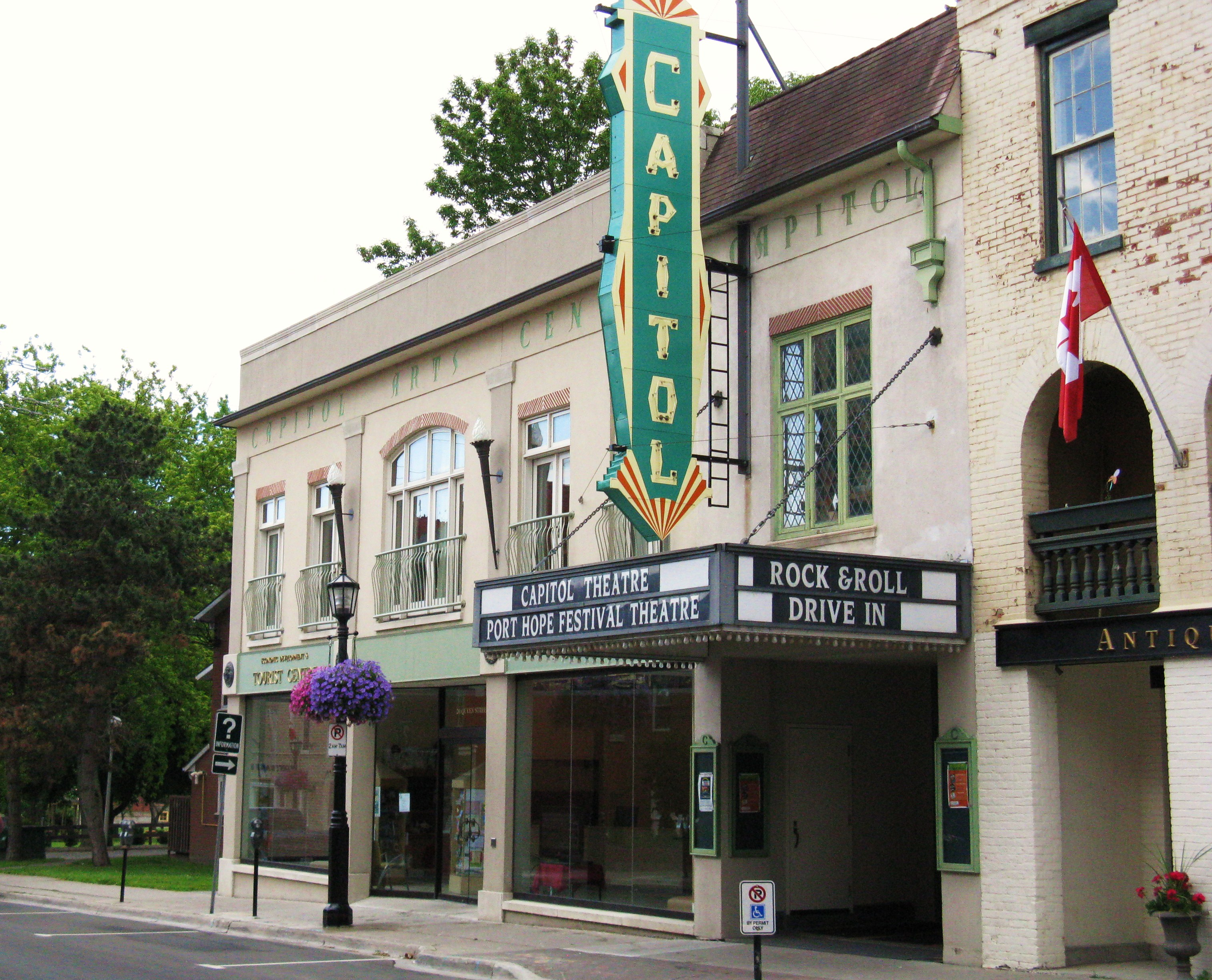
The Capitol Theatre in 2009

In 2013, funding from the Ontario Trillium Foundation allowed the Capitol Theatre to upgrade the projection room from 35mm films to digital projection – allowing the theatre to continue to screen new releases.

Currently, the Capitol Theatre (which also operates under the title "Cameco Capitol Arts Centre"), operates as both a movie theatre and hosts live stage productions; and is run by staff with the assistance of a large base of volunteers. The theatre was designated a National Historic Site on July 4, 2016. A federal plaque reflecting its status was unveiled in a ceremony on November 15, 2017.

== Architecture ==
Common in theatre design at the time of the construction of the Capitol Theatre was the layout of a small entrance frontage and a long narrow lobby with the auditorium opening out behind street-front stores. This was because taxes were based on street frontage, land for the larger auditorium was cheaper on back lots and a long narrow lobby connecting the entrance to the auditorium worked well for ticket line-ups. as a theatre built exclusively for talking pictures, it had a small stage, low rake to the floor, no back-stage facilities, a minimal number of washrooms and limited lobby space.

Built at the beginning of the [Great Depression in Canada], the capitol was designed as an atmospheric movie theatre, a low cost, highly visual Theatre design. Twilight sky, hanging vines and castellated battlements are all part of the Norman Courtyard design; an outdoor illusion, enhanced by clouds projected on to the seamless ceiling by a Brenograph (an innovative machine of the 1920s).

The facade begins the illusion that one is approaching a medieval castle with its leaded, diamond paned windows. The exterior Egyptian-motif "Capitol" sign is original to the theatre. It was, apparently erected on instructions from Famous Players, and was not in the original designs. The projecting marquee emulates a drawbridge to the outer lobby with its stenciled detail, faux painted walls and original terrazzo floor, show boards and ticket window.

The Art Deco influence of the 1930s construction period is most evident in the paint colours and stencils used in the lobby and auditorium. From the inner lobby with its original furniture, one ascends the steps to the auditorium where frescoed walls and ceiling suggest one is sitting in a medieval castle courtyard, which was created with the use of faux plaster work walls that are finished in 17 different colours.

Ceiling plaster was applied in one continuous operation by recruiting a large team of plasterers from miles around, who worked around the clock standing on cedar pole scaffolding, to obtain a seamless sky before the plaster had a chance to dry. Much of the artwork was rendered not in paint but in wet coloured plaster, according to the traditional fresco method. In the trade, these theatres were sometimes called "soft tops" since the illusion was of no ceiling—of being out of doors. Stencils on the proscenium arch are original, as are the wall lanterns.
