= Welcome, Ontario =

Welcome
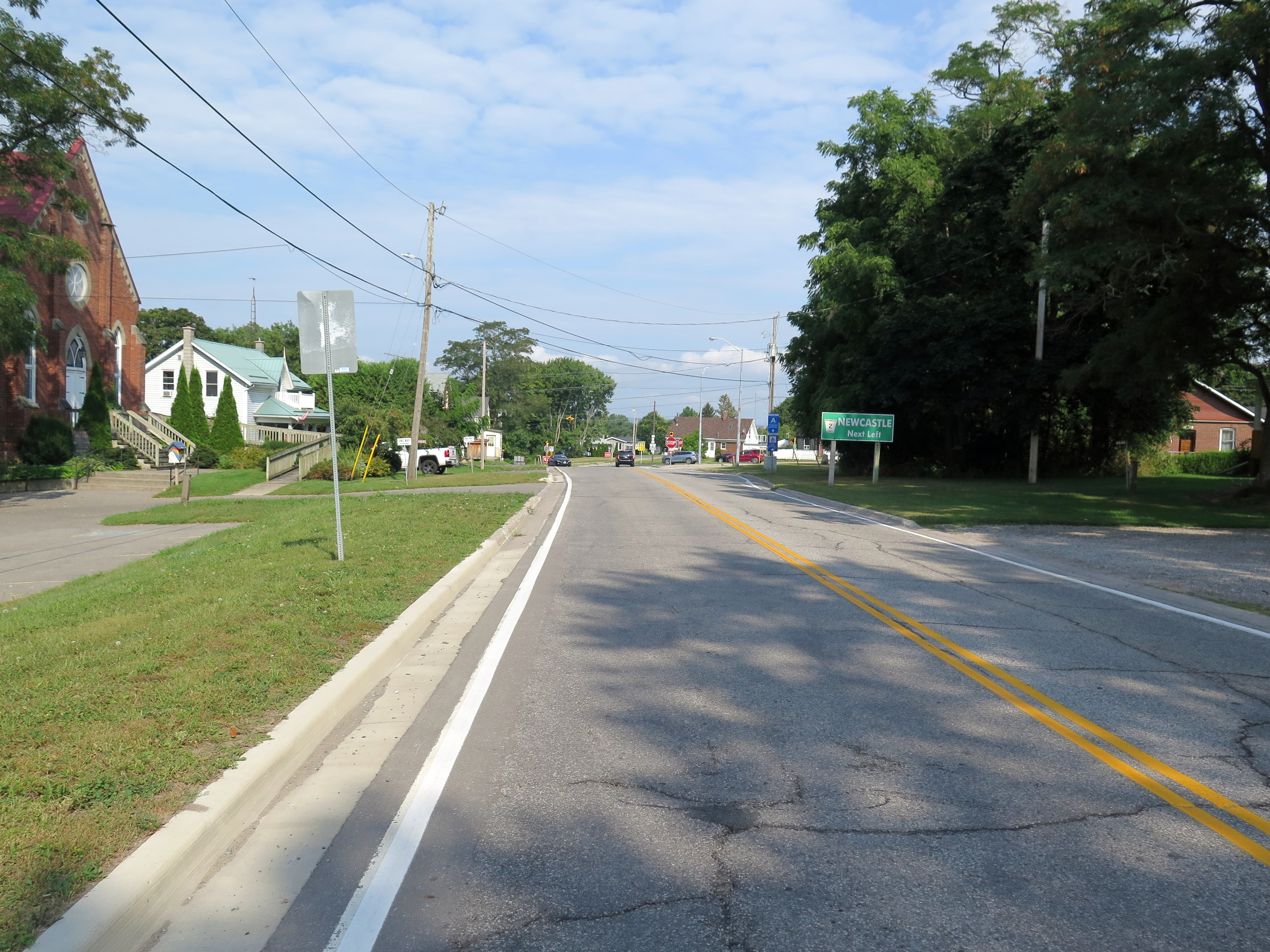
- Welcome, 2021

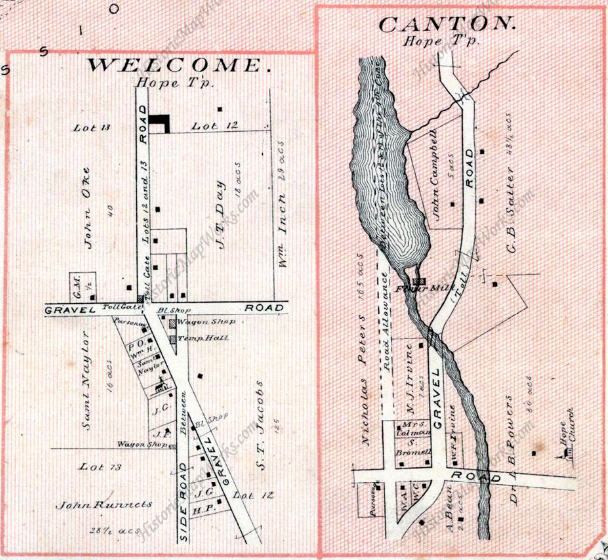
- Plan of Welcome and Canton in 1878

- Location of Welcome in Ontario
- Coordinates: 43.974210°N 78.342365°W
- Country: Canada
- Province: Ontario
- County: Northumberland
- Municipality: Port Hope
- Elevation: 126 m (413 ft)
- Time zone: UTC-5 (EST)
  - Summer (DST): UTC-4 (EDT)
- Area codes: 905, 289, 365

Welcome is a community in the municipality of Port Hope, Northumberland County, Ontario, Canada. It is located at the crossroads of County Road 10, heading north to the community of Canton; County Road 74, heading east to Dale; and County Road 2 (formerly Ontario Highway 2) heading west to Morrish and southeast to interchange 461 on Ontario Highway 401 and further southeast to the town centre of Port Hope.

Current Mayor: Mike Brooking

Deputy Mayor: Brian Bracken
