= Ganaraska River =

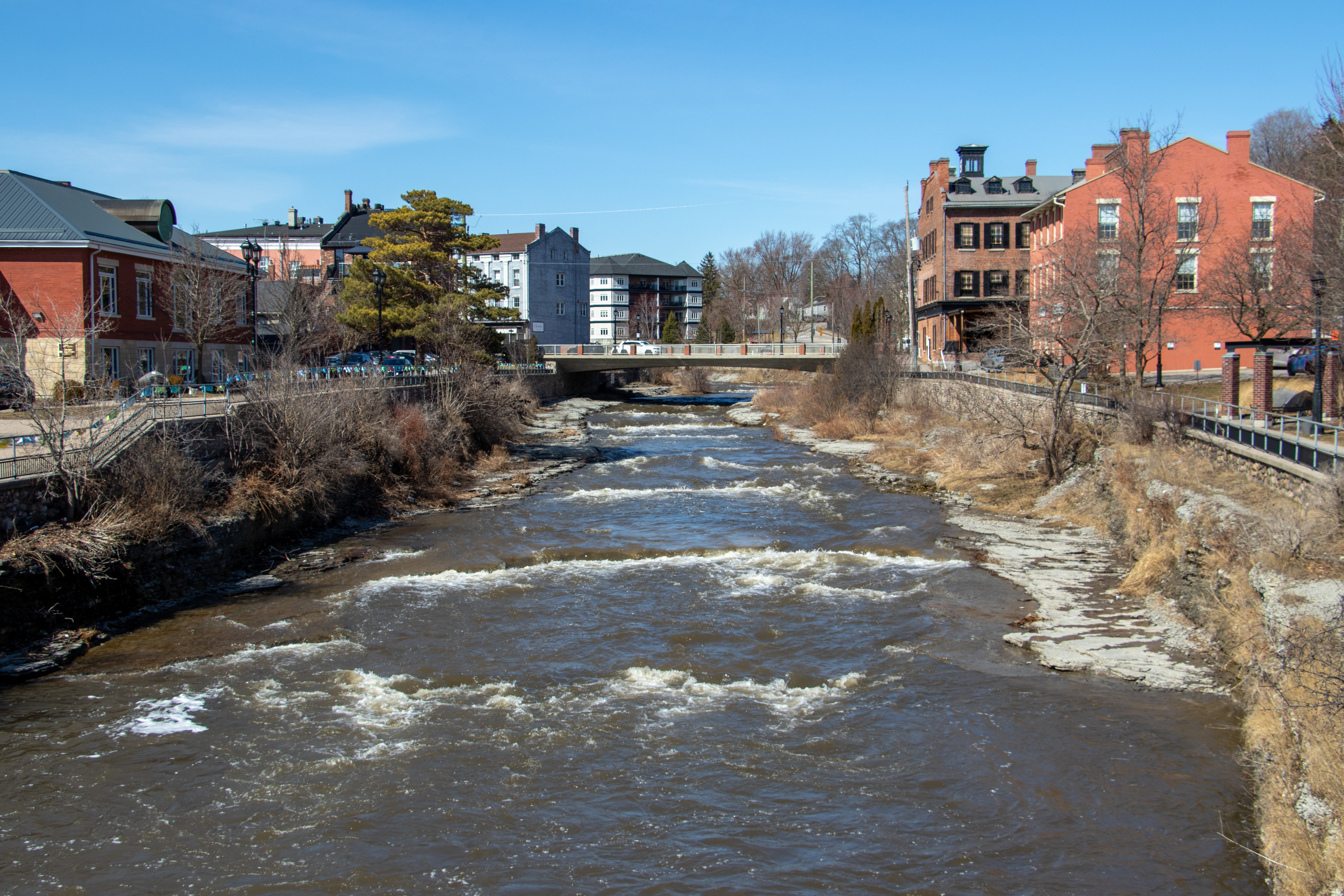
- The Ganaraska River flowing through Port Hope

- Location of the mouth of the Ganaraska River in southern Ontario
- Etymology: from Ganaraske, the name for the Cayuga village at the river mouth

Location
- Country: Canada
- Province: Ontario
- Region: Southern Ontario
- Districts: Northumberland County; Regional Municipality of Durham

Physical characteristics
- Source: Ganaraska Forest on the Oak Ridges Moraine
  - location: Clarington, Regional Municipality of Durham
  - coordinates: 44°03′15″N 78°36′22″W
  - elevation: 344 m (1,129 ft)
- Mouth: Lake Ontario
  - location: Port Hope, Northumberland County
  - coordinates: 43°56′30″N 78°17′26″W
  - elevation: 74 m (243 ft)
- Basin size: 278 km^{2} (107 sq mi)

Basin features
- River system: Great Lakes Basin
- Tributaries
  - left: North Ganaraska River

The Ganaraska River is a river in Northumberland County and the Regional Municipality of Durham in Southern Ontario, Canada. It is part of the Great Lakes Basin, and is a tributary of Lake Ontario, which it reaches at the central community of the municipality of Port Hope. The river's name is thought to be derived from Ganaraske, the Cayuga name for the village this Iroquoian nation had established in this area in 1779.

Together with other nations of the Haudenosaunee Confederacy, they had migrated from New York, forced to cede their homelands because of having allied with the British in the American Revolutionary War. The Crown provided additional lands to the Haudenosaunee peoples, including what is now called the Six Nations of the Grand River reserve.

Later the Crown granted land here to United Empire Loyalists, in compensation for their losses in the Northeast colonies, especially New York. They were the first European Americans to settle here in any number.

== Course ==
The river begins on the Oak Ridges Moraine in the Ganaraska Forest in the municipality of Clarington, about 1.5 kilometres (0.9 mi) southeast of the junction of Ontario Highway 35 and Ontario Highway 115. It flows southeast past the community of Kendal, takes in the left tributary North Ganaraska River, and turns south to its mouth on the north shore of Lake Ontario.

== Watershed ==
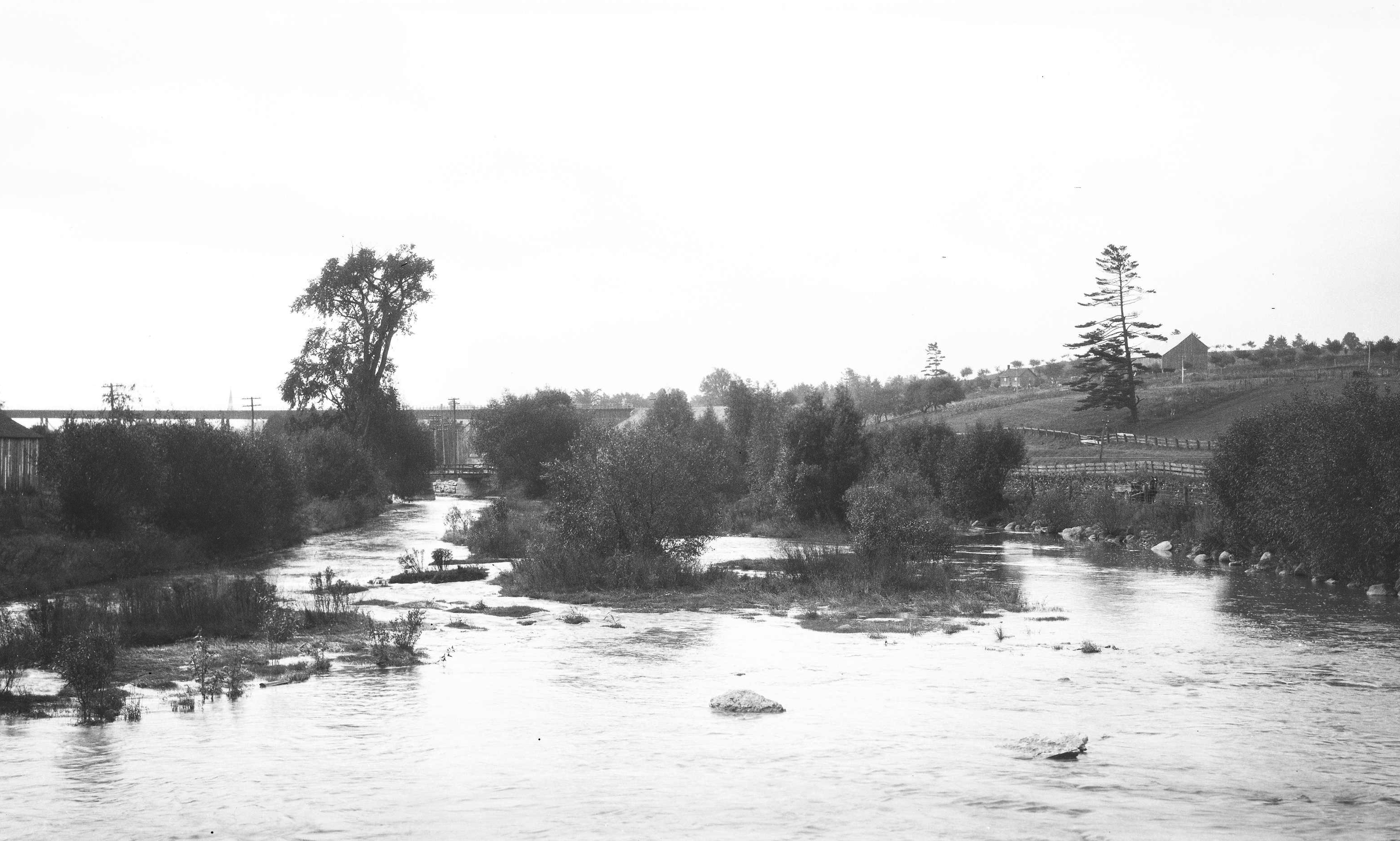
The Ganaraska River in Port Hope, 1912

Portions of the Ganaraska River drainage basin of 278 square kilometres (107 sq mi) extend into the City of Kawartha Lakes; the Township of Cavan Monaghan, Peterborough County; and the Township of Hamilton, Northumberland County.

== Natural history ==
There have been major conservation efforts in recent years.

It attracts anglers for salmon and trout. The Ganaraska River Fishway, a fish ladder, allows rainbow trout to travel up river to spawn.

== Flood of 1980 ==
The river had a flood in 1980, that caused considerable damage to the Port Hope downtown area.

== See also ==
- Ganaraska Region
- List of Ontario rivers

== Sources ==
- Map 3 (PDF) (Map). 1 : 700,000. Official road map of Ontario. Ministry of Transportation of Ontario. 2014.
- Map 6 (PDF) (Map). 1 : 700,000. Official road map of Ontario. Ministry of Transportation of Ontario. 2014.
- Restructured municipalities - Ontario map #5 (Map). Restructuring Maps of Ontario. Ontario Ministry of Municipal Affairs and Housing. 2006. Archived from the original on 2020-05-11.
