= Port Hope, Ontario =

Port Hope
- Municipality (lower-tier)
- Municipality of Port Hope
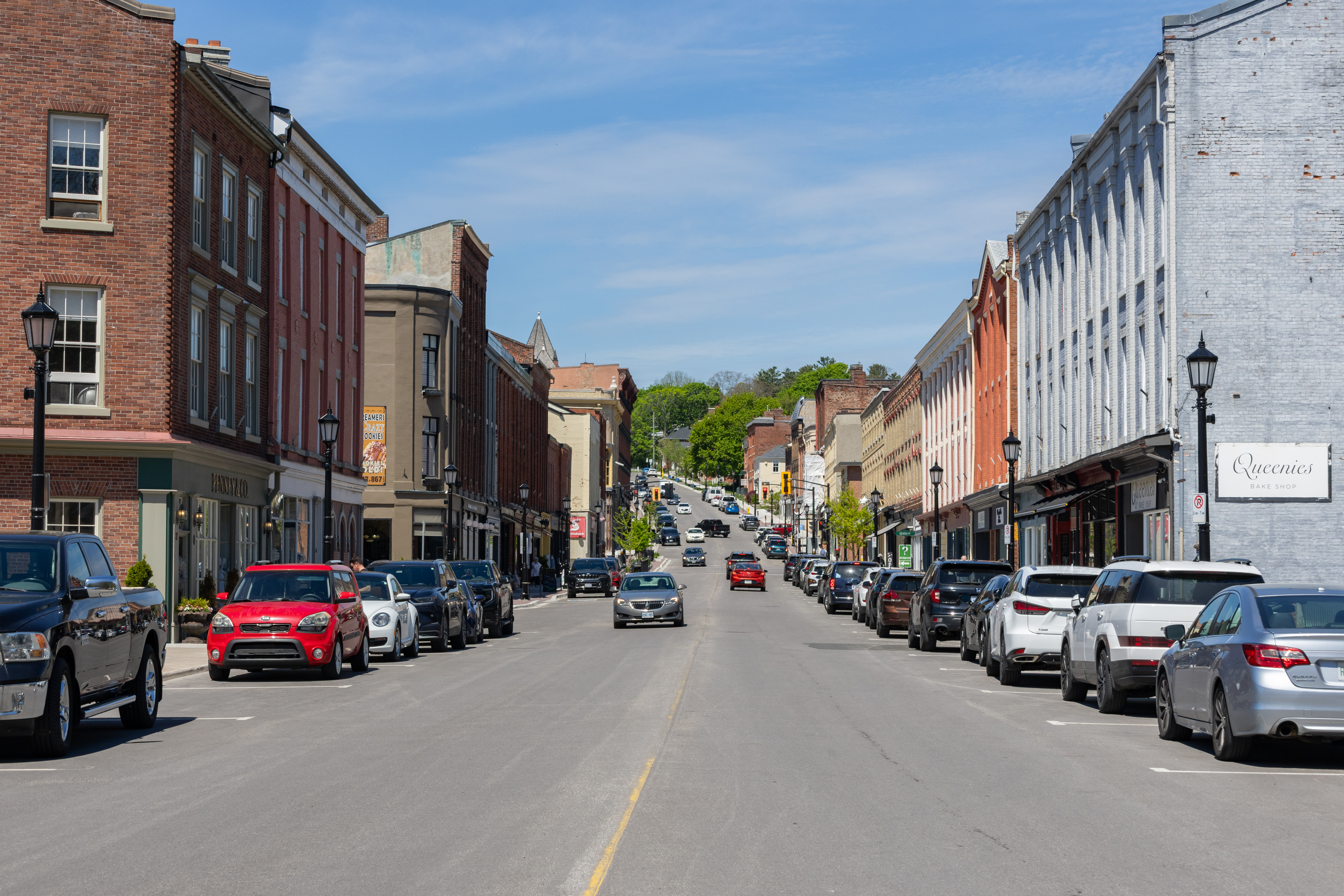
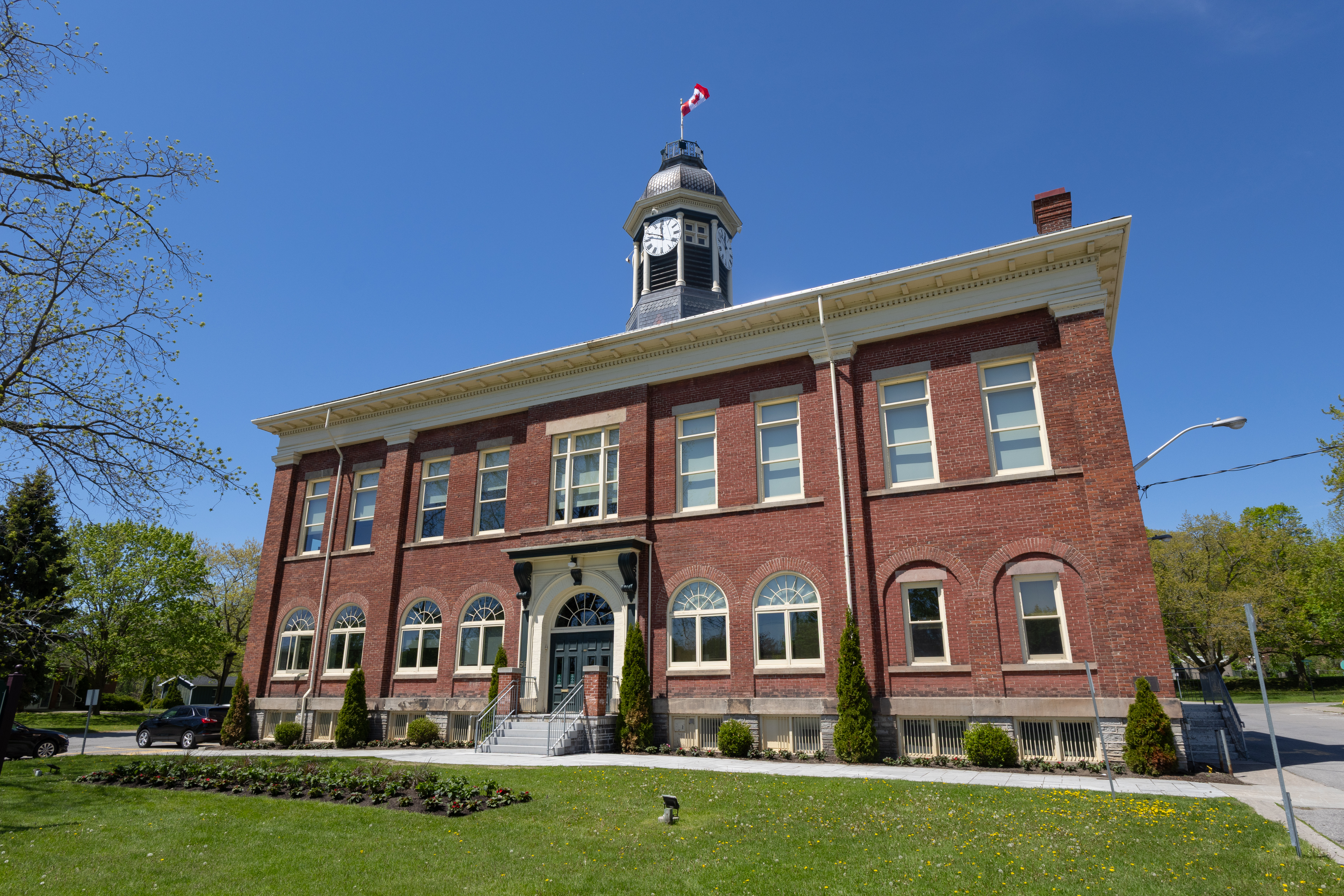
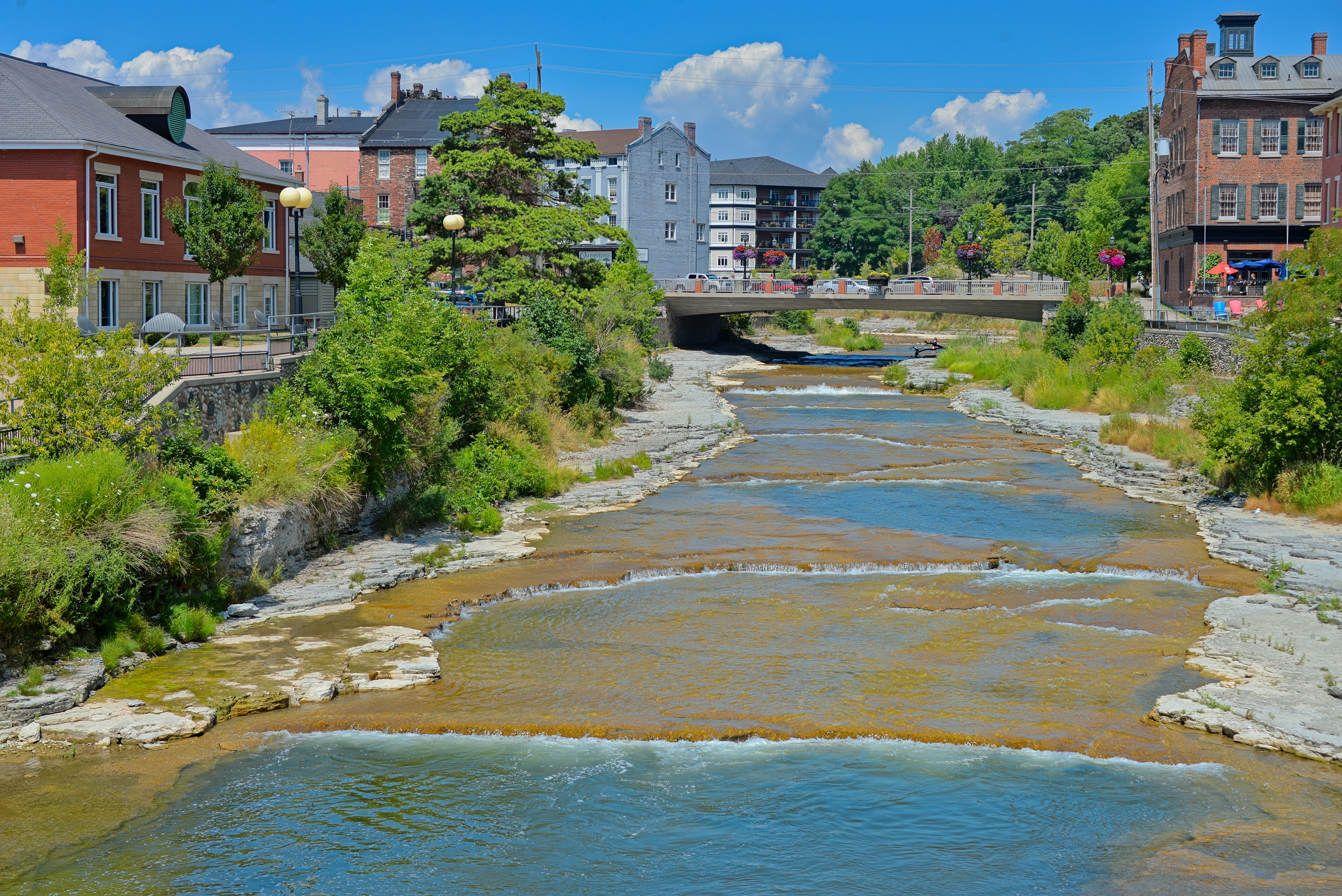
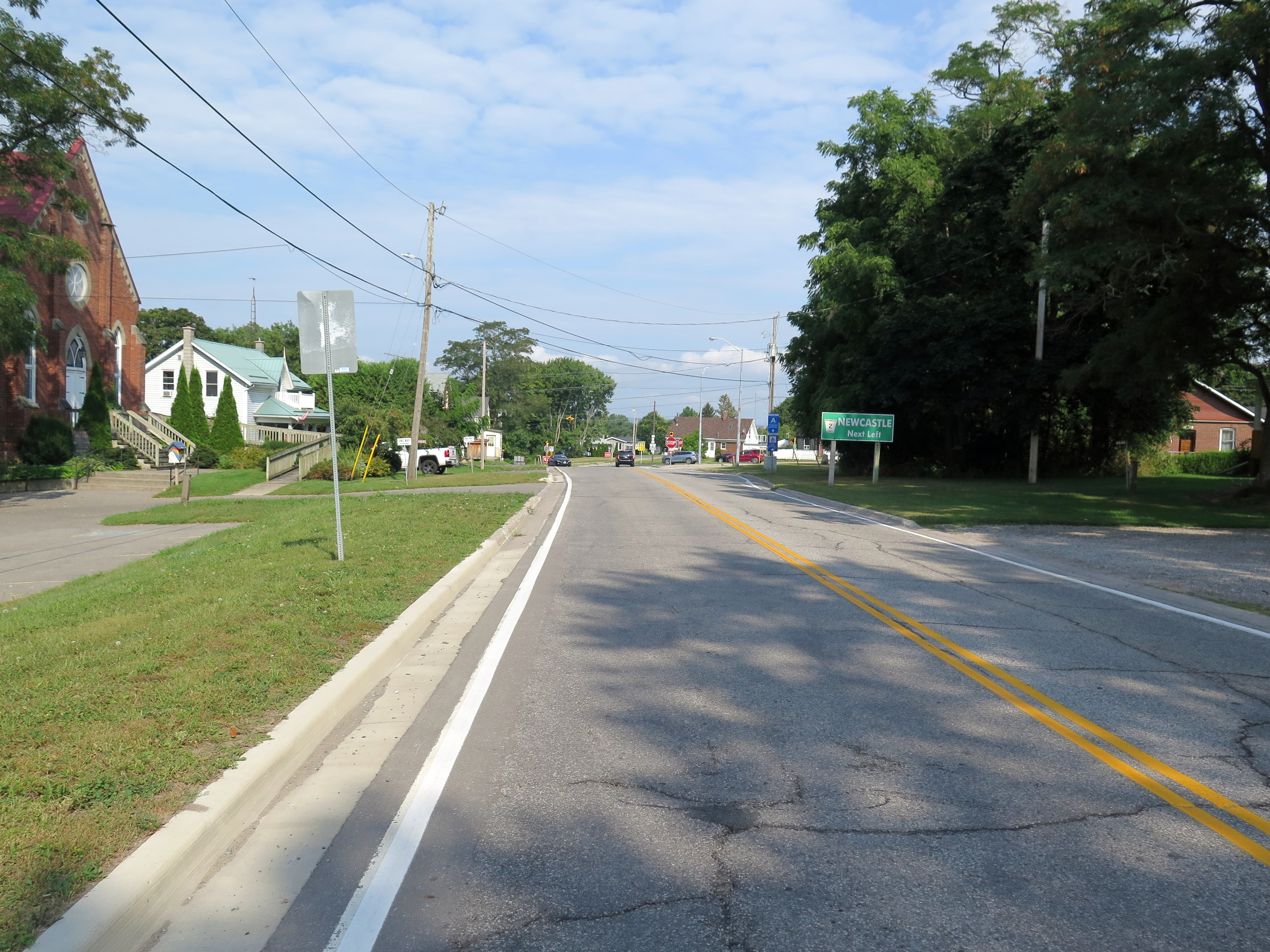
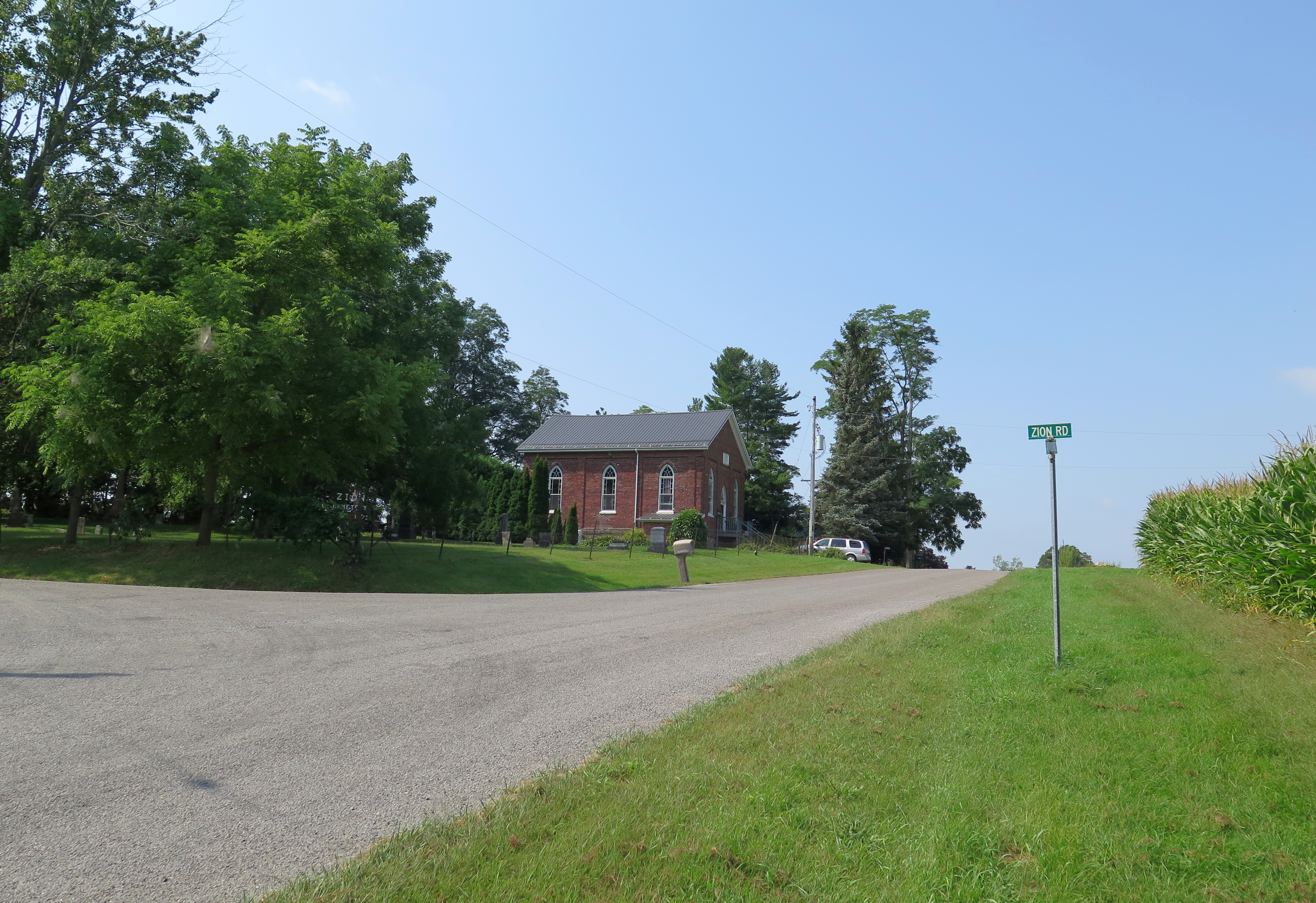
- From top, left to right: Downtown Port Hope, Port Hope Town Hall, Ganaraska River, Welcome, Zion

- Logo

- Location within Northumberland County Location within Southern Ontario
- Coordinates: 43°57′N 78°18′W
- Country: Canada
- Province: Ontario
- County: Northumberland
- Formed: 1789
- Named for: Henry Hope

Government
  - Type: Municipality
  - Mayor: Todd Attridge
  - Federal riding: Northumberland—Clarke
  - Prov. riding: Northumberland—Peterborough South

Area
  - Land: 278.80 km^{2} (107.65 sq mi)
  - Urban: 12.72 km^{2} (4.91 sq mi)

Population (2021)
  - Total: 17,294
  - Density: 62/km^{2} (160/sq mi)
  - Urban: 13,012
  - Urban density: 1,023.1/km^{2} (2,650/sq mi)
- Time zone: UTC−05:00 (EST)
  - Summer (DST): UTC−04:00 (EDT)
- Forward Sortation Area: L1A
- Area codes: 905, 289 and 365
- Website: www.porthope.ca

Port Hope is a municipality in Eastern Ontario, Canada, about 109 km (68 mi) east of Toronto and 159 km (99 mi) west of Kingston. It is at the mouth of the Ganaraska River on the north shore of Lake Ontario, in the west end of Northumberland County. The private Trinity College School opened here in 1865.

== History ==
The Cayuga people inhabited the area in the early 17th century, and there was a Mississauga village named Cochingomink also in the 17th century.

In 1778, a fur trade post was established and the settlement was known as Smith's Creek.

In 1793, Loyalists from the northern colonies became the first permanent settlers of European heritage in the area, as the Crown granted them land as compensation for being forced to leave the colonies (much of their property was confiscated by rebel governments) and as payment for military service. John Graves Simcoe, then lieutenant governor of Upper Canada, established the Township of Hope in the early 1790s, named after Colonel Henry Hope, lieutenant governor of the Province of Quebec.

From 1817 to 1819, the area was known as Toronto or "Toronto at Smith's Creek". (Note: "Port Hope has had several names", Northumberland Today, Tuesday, November 11, 2014, "Charles Fothergill was the spokesperson for the group who wished to change the name of Smith's Creek. When he petitioned the government for a post office in 1817, Mr. Fothergill referred to the area as “Toronto at Smith’s Creek.” The name Toronto appealed to Fothergill because it meant ‘carrying place.’ For two years this area was referred to as Toronto, and the name appeared on legal documents from the village during that period.") (Note: "Port Hope", K.l. Morrison, The Canadian Encyclopedia, October 31, 2012, "From 1817-19 Port Hope was known as Toronto but the citizens then decided on the name Port Hope.")

In 1819, the village and township were united and named Port Hope. (Note: "Port Hope has had several names", Northumberland Today, Tuesday, November 11, 2014, "In June 1819, the village and township were united after a unanimous approval of the name Port Hope.") In 1834 Port Hope was incorporated as a town.

Relatively slow growth from 1881 to 1951 resulted in much of the town's 19th-century architecture surviving. Port Hope's downtown is celebrated as Ontario's best-preserved 19th-century streetscape. The town's chapter of the Architectural Conservancy of Ontario and the Heritage Port Hope Advisory Committee are very active and advise on the restoration and preservation of architecturally or historically significant buildings. With over 270 heritage-designated buildings, Port Hope has a higher per capita rate of preservation than any other town or city in Canada.

In 1978, eight members of the Satan's Choice Motorcycle Club were charged with a murder that occurred at Port Hope's Queen's Hotel. The trial and conviction of some members—the Port Hope 8 case—has been described as a miscarriage of justice.

In 2001, the original town amalgamated with Hope Township to form the Municipality of Port Hope and Hope, which was renamed to its current name in November of that year. At the time of amalgamation, the census listed the town's population as 11,718 and the township's as 3,887.

The 2017 supernatural horror film It, its 2019 sequel It Chapter Two, and its prequel television series It: Welcome to Derry were all filmed in Port Hope, which portrayed the fictional town of Derry, Maine.

=== Radiation and cleanup ===
Port Hope is known for having the largest volume of historic low-level radioactive wastes in Canada. The waste was created by Eldorado Mining and Refining Limited and its private sector predecessors, resulting from the refining of radium from pitchblende. Radium was used in radioluminescent paint (such as aircraft dials) and in early cancer treatments.

During World War II, the Eldorado plant produced exponentially more uranium oxides, which the United States used in the Manhattan Project to make nuclear weapons. This plant, now under the ownership of Cameco, continues to produce uranium fuel for nuclear power plants.

In 2002, a large amount of contaminated soil was removed from beachfront areas. More recently, testing of over 5,000 properties began, with a plan to remove and store contaminated soil that had been used as landfill. Over $1 billion is expected to be spent on the soil remediation project, the largest such cleanup in Canadian history.

== Geography ==
=== Communities ===
Besides the town proper of Port Hope, the municipality of Port Hope comprises a number of villages and hamlets, including Campbellcroft, Canton, Dale, Davidson's Corners (partially), Decker Hollow (ghost town), Elizabethville, Garden Hill, Knoxville, Morrish, Osaca, Perrytown, Port Britain, Rossmount (partially), Tinkerville, Thomstown, Welcome, Wesleyville, and Zion.

=== Climate ===
Port Hope has a humid continental climate (Dfb) with warm summers and cold winters.

Climate data for Port Hope, Ontario (1971–2000)
Month	Jan	Feb	Mar	Apr	May	Jun	Jul	Aug	Sep	Oct	Nov	Dec	Year
Record high °C (°F)	17.2 (63.0)	11.7 (53.1)	19.0 (66.2)	25.6 (78.1)	30.5 (86.9)	34.4 (93.9)	37.2 (99.0)	37.8 (100.0)	37.8 (100.0)	26.7 (80.1)	20.6 (69.1)	18.3 (64.9)	37.8 (100.0)
Mean daily maximum °C (°F)	−1.8 (28.8)	−1.0 (30.2)	3.4 (38.1)	9.8 (49.6)	15.9 (60.6)	20.9 (69.6)	24.6 (76.3)	24.1 (75.4)	19.7 (67.5)	12.9 (55.2)	6.7 (44.1)	1.1 (34.0)	11.4 (52.5)
Daily mean °C (°F)	−5.8 (21.6)	−4.8 (23.4)	−0.4 (31.3)	5.9 (42.6)	11.7 (53.1)	16.3 (61.3)	20.0 (68.0)	19.9 (67.8)	15.5 (59.9)	9.2 (48.6)	3.6 (38.5)	−2.6 (27.3)	7.4 (45.3)
Mean daily minimum °C (°F)	−9.7 (14.5)	−8.6 (16.5)	−4.2 (24.4)	1.9 (35.4)	7.4 (45.3)	11.8 (53.2)	15.3 (59.5)	15.5 (59.9)	11.3 (52.3)	5.4 (41.7)	0.4 (32.7)	−6.2 (20.8)	3.4 (38.1)
Record low °C (°F)	−32.2 (−26.0)	−30.0 (−22.0)	−22.8 (−9.0)	−13.9 (7.0)	−5.0 (23.0)	2.2 (36.0)	3.3 (37.9)	−0.6 (30.9)	−2.8 (27.0)	−16.7 (1.9)	−27.2 (−17.0)	−29.0 (−20.2)	−32.2 (−26.0)
Average precipitation mm (inches)	59.0 (2.32)	55.8 (2.20)	76.6 (3.02)	69.5 (2.74)	65.0 (2.56)	72.1 (2.84)	53.3 (2.10)	75.9 (2.99)	80.7 (3.18)	68.7 (2.70)	75.0 (2.95)	80.5 (3.17)	832.0 (32.76)
Average rainfall mm (inches)	21.0 (0.83)	28.6 (1.13)	58.6 (2.31)	67.6 (2.66)	65.0 (2.56)	72.1 (2.84)	53.3 (2.10)	75.9 (2.99)	80.7 (3.18)	68.7 (2.70)	70.3 (2.77)	48.0 (1.89)	709.8 (27.94)
Average snowfall cm (inches)	38.0 (15.0)	27.2 (10.7)	17.9 (7.0)	1.9 (0.7)	0.0 (0.0)	0.0 (0.0)	0.0 (0.0)	0.0 (0.0)	0.0 (0.0)	0.0 (0.0)	4.7 (1.9)	32.5 (12.8)	122.3 (48.1)
Average precipitation days (≥ 0.2 mm)	11.8	9.6	10.1	10.6	10.6	10.3	7.7	10.1	11.0	12.1	11.7	12.5	128.1
Average rainy days (≥ 0.2 mm)	3.4	3.4	7.0	10.2	10.6	10.3	7.7	10.1	11.0	12.1	10.8	6.0	102.6
Average snowy days (≥ 0.2 cm)	8.7	6.6	3.6	0.59	0.0	0.0	0.0	0.0	0.0	0.0	1.1	7.0	27.6
Source: Environment Canada

== Demographics ==
In the 2021 Census of Population conducted by Statistics Canada, Port Hope had a population of 17,294 living in 7,318 of its 7,607 total private dwellings, a change of 3.2% from its 2016 population of 16,753. With a land area of 278.8 km^{2} (107.6 sq mi), it had a population density of 62.0/km^{2} (160.7/sq mi) in 2021.

Canada census – Port Hope community profile

	2021	2016	2011
Population	17,294 (+3.2% from 2016)	16,753 (+3.3% from 2011)	16,214 (−1.1% from 2006)
Land area	278.80 km^{2} (107.65 sq mi)	278.87 km^{2} (107.67 sq mi)	279.03 km^{2} (107.73 sq mi)
Population density	62.0/km^{2} (161/sq mi)	60.1/km^{2} (156/sq mi)	58.1/km^{2} (150/sq mi)
Median age	50.8 (M: 48.8, F: 52.8)	50.6 (M: 48.8, F: 51.9)
Private dwellings	7,607 (total) 7,318 (occupied)	7,305 (total)	6,870 (total)
Median household income	$88,000	$72,435

References: 2021 2016 2011

Port Hope Historical census populations

Year	Pop.	±%
1841	1,200	—
1851	2,476	+106.3%
1871	5,114	+106.5%
1881	5,581	+9.1%
1891	5,042	−9.7%
1901	4,188	−16.9%
1911	5,092	+21.6%

Year	Pop.	±%
1921	4,456	−12.5%
1931	4,723	+6.0%
1941	5,006	+6.0%
1951	6,548	+30.8%
1961	8,091	+23.6%
1971	8,872	+9.7%
1981	9,992	+12.6%

Year	Pop.	±%
1991	11,505	+15.1%
2001	15,605	+35.6%
2006	16,390	+5.0%
2011	16,214	−1.1%
2016	16,753	+3.3%
2021	17,294	+3.2%

Population counts are not adjusted for boundary changes.

Mother tongue (2021):

- English as first language: 93.5%
- French as first language: 1.1%
- English and French as first language: 0.4%
- Other as first language: 4.3%

== Economy ==
Top ten Port Hope industries by employment (2015)
Company	Employees
CPK Interior Products	403
Cameco Corporation	390
ESCO	157
Cameco Fuel Services	140
Akzo Nobel	78
Standard Auto Wreckers	60
Disk Tooling	40
Curtis Chicks	32
Unitrak	21
Port Hope Patterns	12

Downtown Port Hope offers shopping and a historic main street. Port Hope is served by a Via Rail station. It has a medical centre, and a community health centre. It has had a daily newspaper since 1878, the Port Hope Evening Guide. Until 2007, this was part of the Osprey Media chain and subsequently a part of the Sun Media organization. In 2009 the newspaper was amalgamated with the Cobourg Daily Star and renamed as Northumberland Today.com. In November 2017 the newspaper was included in the large-scale closing of many local community newspapers throughout the province of Ontario.

Port Hope's Economic Development Strategic Plan aims to increase job growth at least as fast as population growth. The town has a variety of industries.

In January 2025, the Ontario Government announced plans for a new nuclear generating station—New Nuclear at Wesleyville—to be built at Wesleyville.

== Arts and culture ==
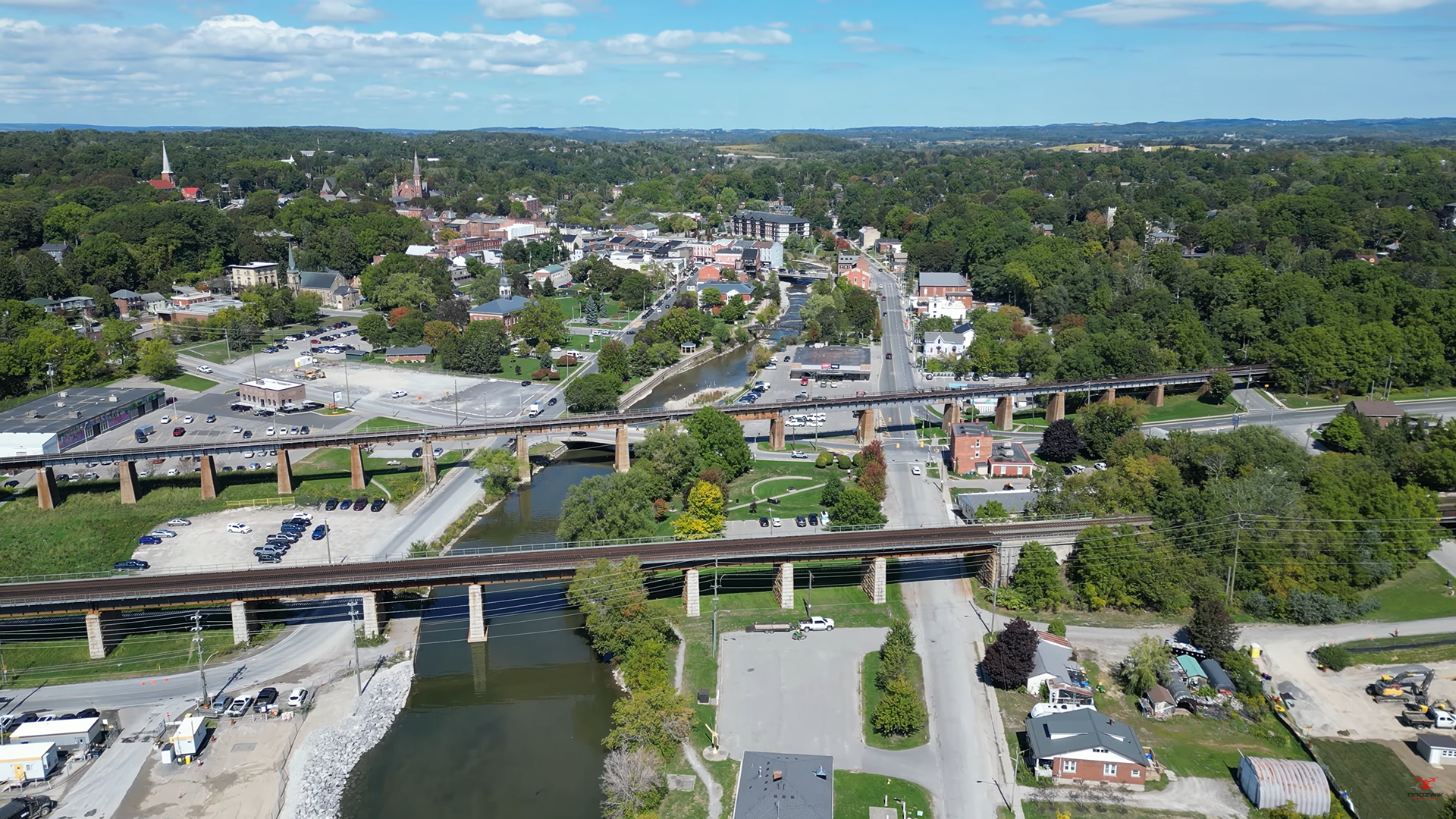
Ganaraska River at Port Hope

The Ganaraska River (affectionately known as "The Ganny"), is well known to area anglers for annual salmon and trout runs. It has caused many historic floods, the most recent having occurred on March 21–22, 1980. Every April since until 2020, Port Hope has commemorated the flood with "Float Your Fanny Down the Ganny" ten kilometre boat race. "Participants range from serious paddlers navigating the cold, fast-moving water in kayaks and canoes, to the very entertaining 'crazy craft' paddlers, floating any combination of materials down the river in an attempt to reach the finish line." Due to the COVID-19 pandemic, the event was cancelled in 2020 and 2021, the first time in its history for such action.

Music Festivals include "Hibernate", a summer concert series "Road to Cultivate", and a fall festival "Cultivate".

== Attractions ==
The Capitol Theatre is Canada's last functioning atmospheric theatre. The theatre's main auditorium is styled after an outdoor medieval courtyard and rolling clouds are projected onto the ceiling. The town spent in excess of three million dollars renovating and upgrading the theatre in 2004–2005. It is also used for live events by Port Hope Festival Theatre.

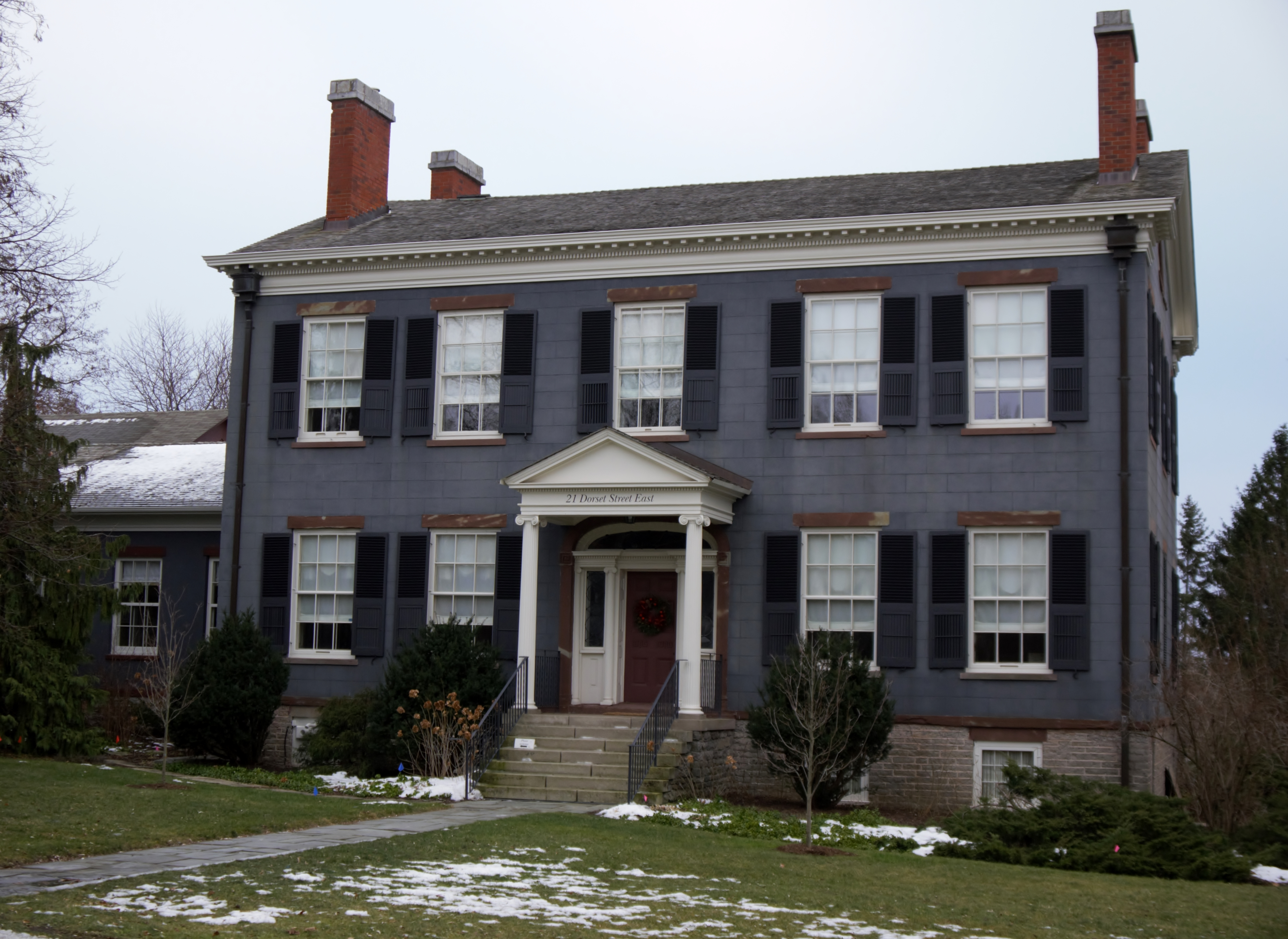
John David Smith House, c. 1834

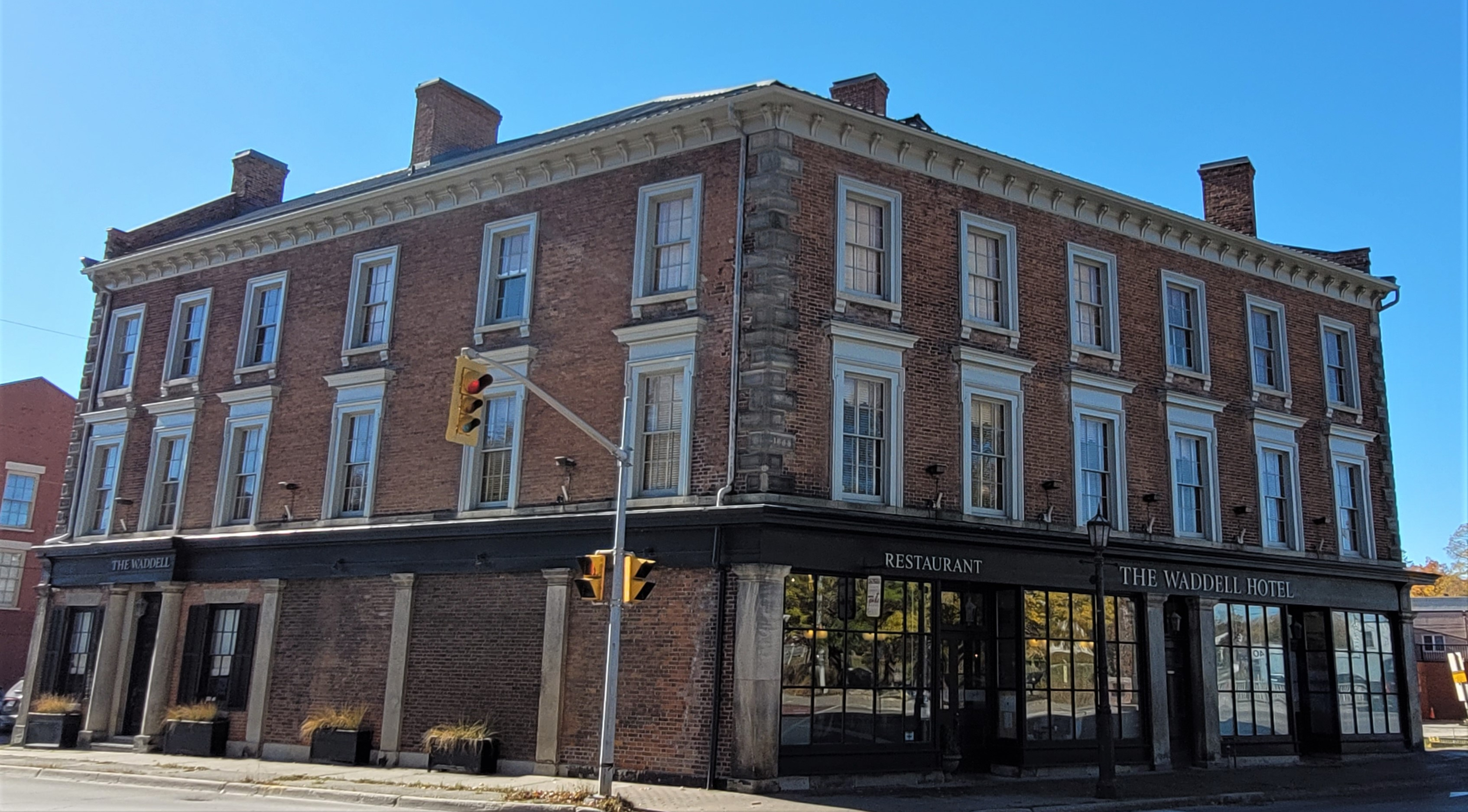
Waddell Block-Lantern Inn, 1845

The Municipality of Port Hope is home to many heritage and cultural attractions, and events, including:

- Float Your Fanny Down the Ganny—a water race commemorating the 1980 flood of the Ganaraska River
- Ganaraska Forest Centre
- Canadian Firefighters Museum (now demolished)
- Port Hope Yacht Club
- Port Hope Festival Theatre at the Capitol Theatre
- La Jeunesse Youth Orchestra (3 concerts per year)
- Port Hope and District Agricultural Fall Fair
- The All Canadian Jazz Festival
- Port Hope Farmers' Market (May to October)
- Port Hope Christmas and Santa Claus Parade (includes Festival of Trees, Candlelight Walk to Memorial Park, and Carol Singing)
- Port Hope Drive-In (Built in 1952, it is among the oldest Canadian drive-ins still operating)
- Architectural Conservancy of Ontario Annual House Tour, Garden Tour, and Antiques and Artifacts Auction
- Port Hope and District Historical Society Dorothy's House Museum
- Port Hope Archives
- Friends of Wesleyville Village
- Beaches:
  - West Beach (parking at the end of Marsh Street)
  - East Beach (parking at the bottom of King Street at Madison Street)
- Port Hope Waterfront Trail
- Port Hope Golf and Country Club

== Infrastructure ==
=== Transportation ===
Highway 401 runs through the north end of Port Hope, with exits at County Road 2/Toronto Road (461) and Highway 28/Ontario Street (464).

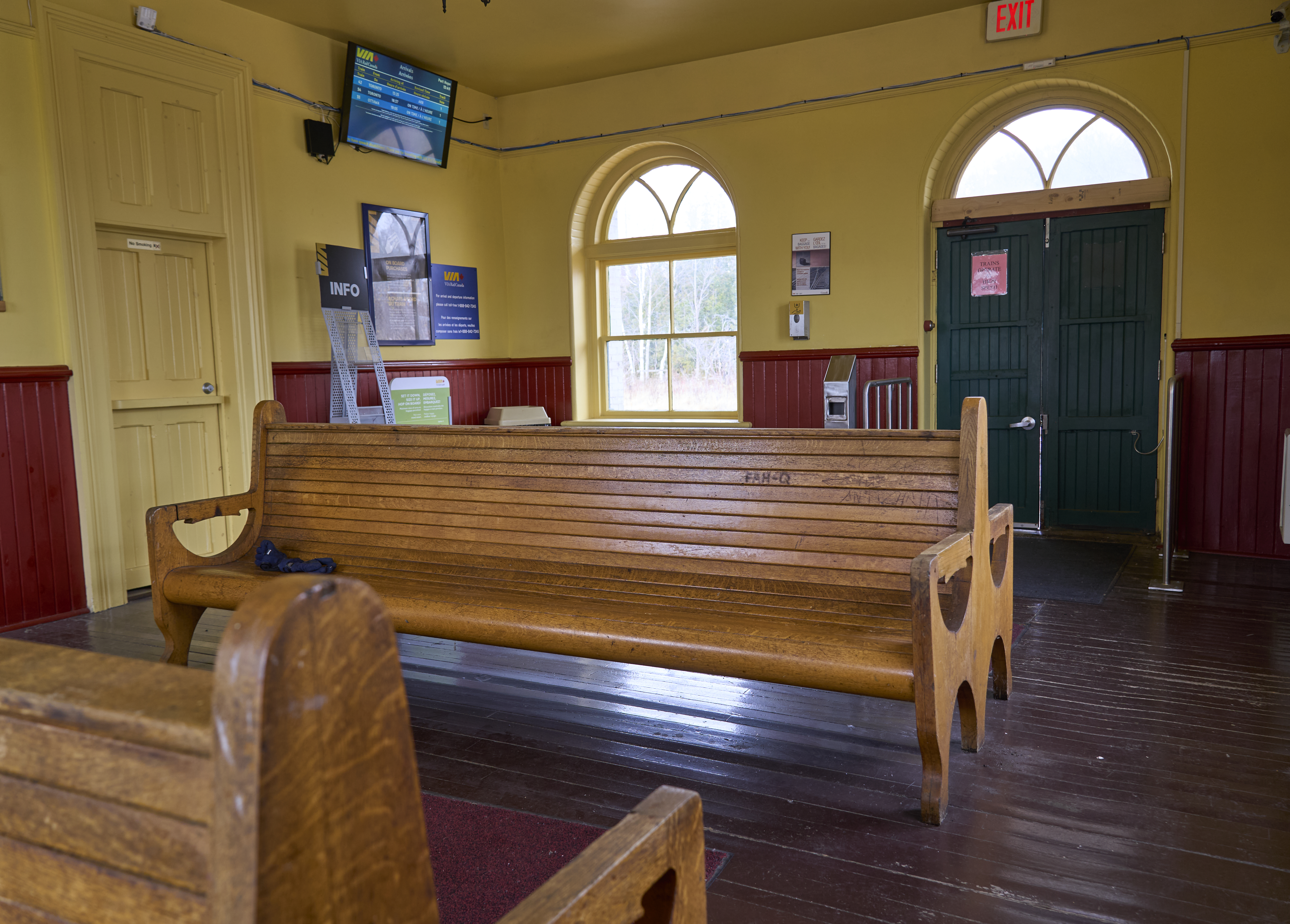
An inside look of the Port Hope VIA Rail station

Port Hope Transit provides local bus service, and VIA Rail provides passenger service from the Port Hope railway station along the Toronto-Montreal corridor. The station was built in 1856 for the Grand Trunk Railway and later CN Rail. It was restored in 1985.

Pleasure boats dock at the foot of John Street at Hayward Street and share the facilities with Cameco, which has berths for freighters servicing their manufacturing facilities at the mouth of the Ganaraska River.

== Education ==
Public education in Port Hope is under the management of the Kawartha Pine Ridge District School Board, and Catholic education is by the Peterborough Victoria Northumberland and Clarington Catholic District School Board.

=== Elementary schools ===
- St. Anthony's Elementary School, Catholic JK–8
- Ganaraska Trail Public School, Public JK–5
- North Hope Central School, Public JK–6
- Beatrice Strong Public School, Public JK–6

=== High schools ===
- Port Hope High School c. 1871, Public Gr 9-12 - opened in 1853 as Port Hope Grammar School
- Dr M. S. Hawkins Senior Public School, Public Gr 6–8 (same building as Port Hope High School)
- Port Hope High School Student to Work Transition Program (SWOT Campus), Public Grade 9–12
- Trinity College School, Private Gr 5–12
- Discovery Academy, International campus (not active)

== Notable people ==
- Owen Beck, professional ice hockey player.
- David Blackwood (1941–2022), artist.
- Lew Cirne, pioneer of Application Performance Management, founder of Wily Technology and New Relic.
- William Henry Draper, lawyer, judge, and politician.
- Sue Gardner, executive director of the Wikimedia Foundation.
- J.J. Hagerman, Colorado railroad and mining magnate who went on to become one of founders of New Mexico.
- William Leonard Hunt ("The Great Farini"), entertainer.
- Watson Kirkconnell (1895-1977), linguist, public intellectual, father of multiculturalism in Canada, and a highly important figure in both Canadian poetry and the culture of Canada.
- Archibald Cameron Macdonell, commander of the 1st Canadian Division during the First World War.
- Charles Vincent Massey, first Canadian-born Governor General of Canada.
- Claire Mowat, writer.
- Farley Mowat, conservationist and writer.
- Alice Munro, author and Nobel Prize winner, lived in Port Hope.
- Dennis O'Brien, NHL hockey player.
- Shane O'Brien, NHL hockey player.
- David Piccini (born 1988), politician, Ontario’s Minister of Labour, Immigration, Training & Skills Development
- Cal Quantrill, Major League Baseball player.
- Paul Quantrill, Major League Baseball player.
- Jim Roberts, NHL hockey player.
- Wade Rowland, writer and journalist.
- Joseph M. Scriven, author of the hymn "What a Friend We Have in Jesus".
- William Sims, U.S. Naval Admiral, awarded 1921 Pulitzer Prize for History.
- Ron Smith, NHL hockey player.
- Ambrose Thomas Stanton, Chief Medical Officer for the British colonies. Born in Kendal and attended Port Hope High School.
- Paul Terbenche, NHL hockey player.
- Arthur Trefusis Heneage Williams, politician.
- Major-General Arthur Victor Seymour Williams.

== See also ==
- List of townships in Ontario
- HMCS Port Hope
