= Little Lake (Peterborough) =

Lake in Peterborough, Ontario

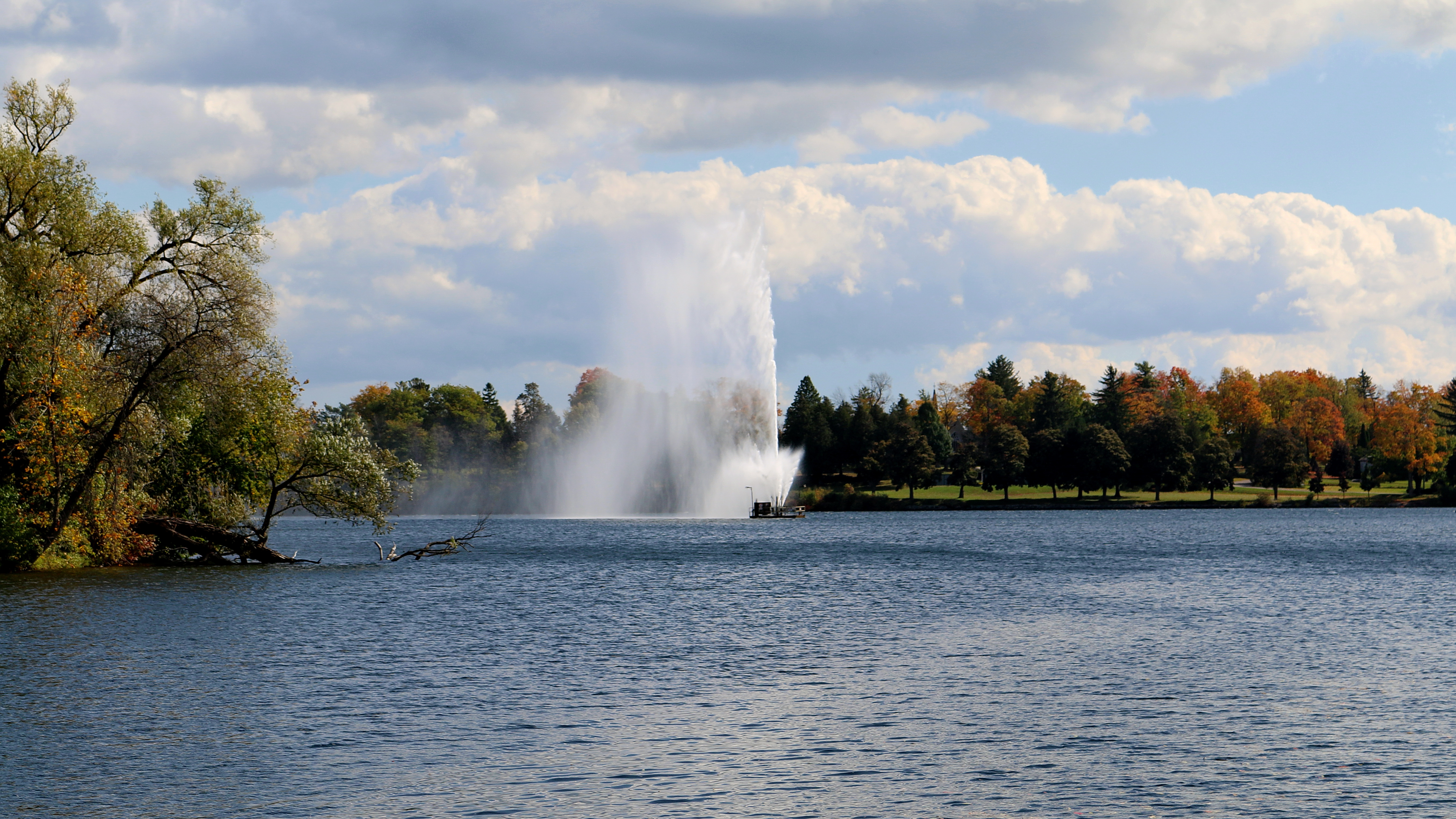
- The fountain in Little Lake

- Location in Ontario

- Location: Peterborough, Ontario, Canada
- Coordinates: 44.2964916°N 78.310271°W
- Type: Lake
- Part of: Trent–Severn Waterway
- Primary inflows: Otonabee River, Jackson creek, Trent Canal
- Primary outflows: Otonabee River
- Basin countries: Canada
- Surface area: 64 hectares (160 acres)

Little Lake is a small lake on the Otonabee River in the city of Peterborough, Ontario, Canada. The lake is in the downtown of the city and is used for fishing, swimming, boating, and for various special events. The lake lies on the water route from Lake Ontario to the Kawartha Lakes. The area around the lake was first settled by Europeans around the start of the 19th century. Steam- and water-powered saw mills were built on the lake and on the river upstream to prepare lumber for shipment overseas. Sawdust and other debris from the mills polluted the lake, killed the fish and clogged up the navigable channels. The smell was so noxious it drove residents near the lake to move. These problems were resolved by the end of the century, when the lake became a hub on the new Trent-Severn Waterway from Lake Ontario to Lake Huron. However, industries attracted by cheap hydroelectric power, such as General Electric used the lake for disposal of industrial chemicals for many years. The pollutants seems to be mostly contained in the sediment, and the lake is now considered safe for recreational use.

== Location ==
Peterborough is about 50 kilometres (31 mi) north of Lake Ontario and south of the Kawartha Lakes. The Otonabee River flows down from the Kawartha Lakes through Peterborough, where it is joined by Jackson creek at Little Lake, and continues south to Rice Lake. From there the Trent River leads to Lake Ontario. The Otonabee River drops by 144 feet (44 m) from Katchewanooka Lake to Little Lake. The Trent Canal leaves the Otonabee River upstream from Little Lake and runs parallel to the river, then rejoins it in Little Lake. With the Otonabee to the west and the canal to the east, the district of Peterborough known as East City is an island.

Little Lake is a natural reservoir that was created in the last ice age. It is at 44.2964916°N 78.310271°W. It has an area of about 64 hectares (160 acres). The land around the lake has a variety of uses, including residential and commercial, parkland and open space. The 32.8 acres (13.3 ha) Little Lake Cemetery extends into the south of the lake. Notable people buried there include the Member of Upper Canada Legislature Alexander McDonell and poet Isabella Valancy Crawford (1853–1887). The cemetery has the grave of the weightlifter Daniel Macdonald. The stone says,

Ye weak beware, here lies the strong,
A victim of his strength,
He lifted sixteen hundred pounds,
and here he lies at length.

== Activities ==
Little Lake is used for swimming, fishing and boating, including power boats, kayaks, canoes and windsurfers. Anglers may catch bass, walleye, perch and muskie in the lake. There is a small marina on the lake in downtown Peterborough with 92 open slips where boats may be moored on a daily, weekly or seasonal basis. The marina is operated by the municipality. In Crary Park Marina the Otonabee River discharges 55 cubic metres per second (1,900 cu ft/s) into the lake, and Jackson Creek discharges 20 cubic metres per second (710 cu ft/s).

The lake is used for special events such as wakeboarding, dragon boating, the Peterborough triathlon and the Festival of Lights. City-owned parkland around the lake includes Beavermead Park (52.6 acres (21.3 ha)), Roger’s Cove Park (7.6 acres (3.1 ha)), Del Crary Park (8.2 acres (3.3 ha)), Millennium Park (4.5 acres (1.8 ha)), James Stevenson Park (13.3 acres (5.4 ha)). Del Crary Park includes an outdoor performance stage beside the Art Gallery of Peterborough. Beavermead Park was once owned by John A. Macdonald, the first Prime Minister of Canada. It takes its name from Beaver Creek and Meades Creek, which flow through the park.

== History ==
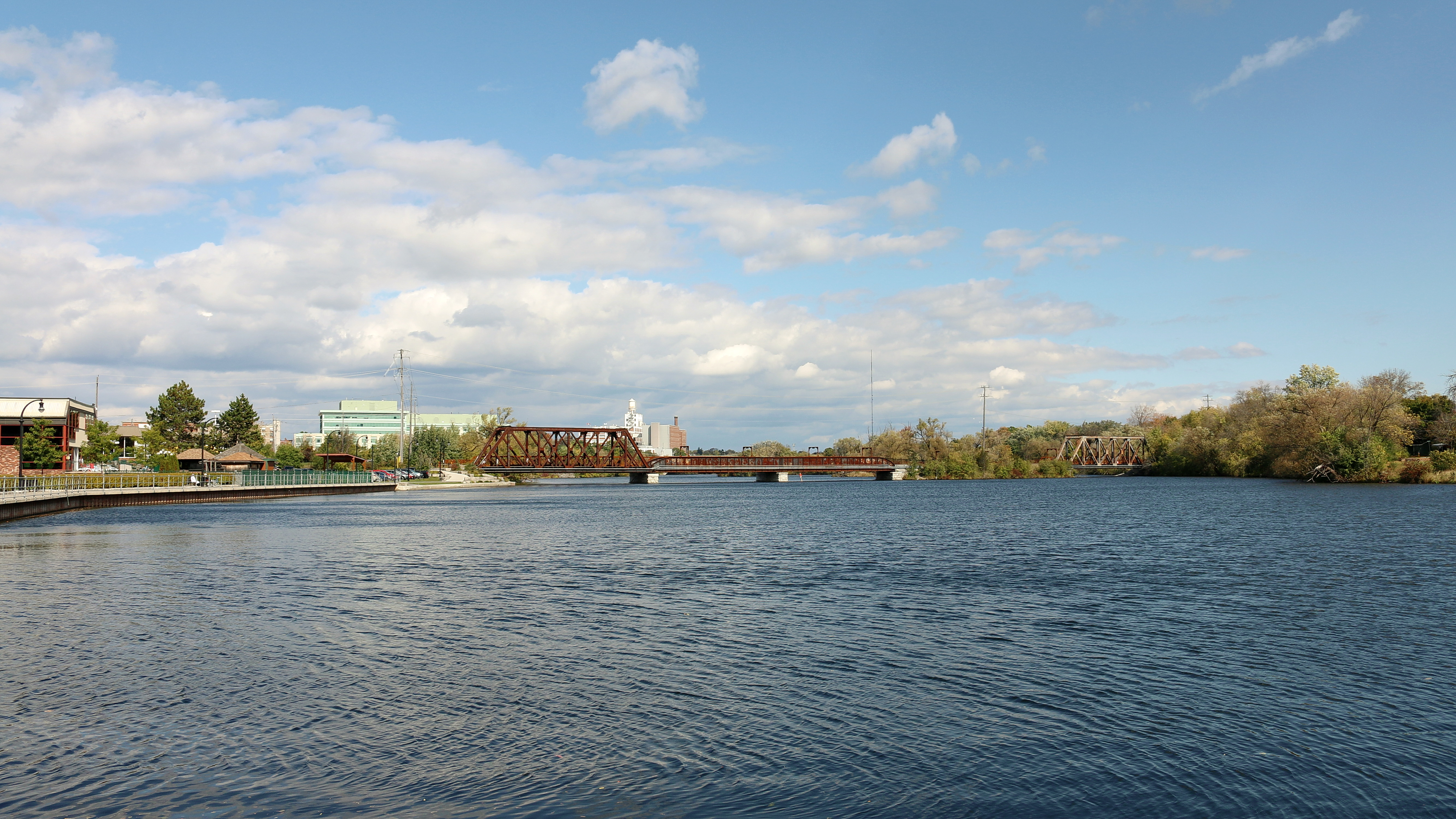
Looking north up the river past the railway bridge

Samuel de Champlain is thought to have launched his canoe in Little Lake, travelling down from there to Rice Lake and the Trent River. In 1818 Adam Scott built a sawmill and grist-mill on the south edge of Little Lake. Scott Plains would eventually grow to become the city of Peterborough. The first British settlers arrived early in the 19th century. They travelled overland to Rice Lake, then up the Otonabee to Scott's Plains. From Little Lake they reached the Kawarthas either by continuing up the Otonabee past what is now Lakefield, or by portaging northwest to Chemong Lake. The wife of one of the first settlers came with her family to the area in the winter of 1822–23. She wrote,

At that time there were but few settlers in these townships; and on the second day we travelled nine or ten miles without seeing a house or clearing. At last, we reached "Scott's mill," (on the 12th of February, 1823, at 1 o'clock p.rn.) then the only house in Peterborough. The Little Lake not being safe for teams to cross on the ice, we were obliged to walk over,—our children and luggage being carried by our servants, and some men who kindly assisted. The snow was then about two feet deep. Our ox-team and sleigh were in waiting on the other side, but by the time we had all reached the place daylight began to fail, which made our progress through the woods much more difficult; and the sleigh being loaded, I was obliged to walk. Our lantern, unfortunately, got filled with snow, and our candle so wet that it would not light. So we proceeded slowly, and at last perceived a light before us, and soon reached our log house.

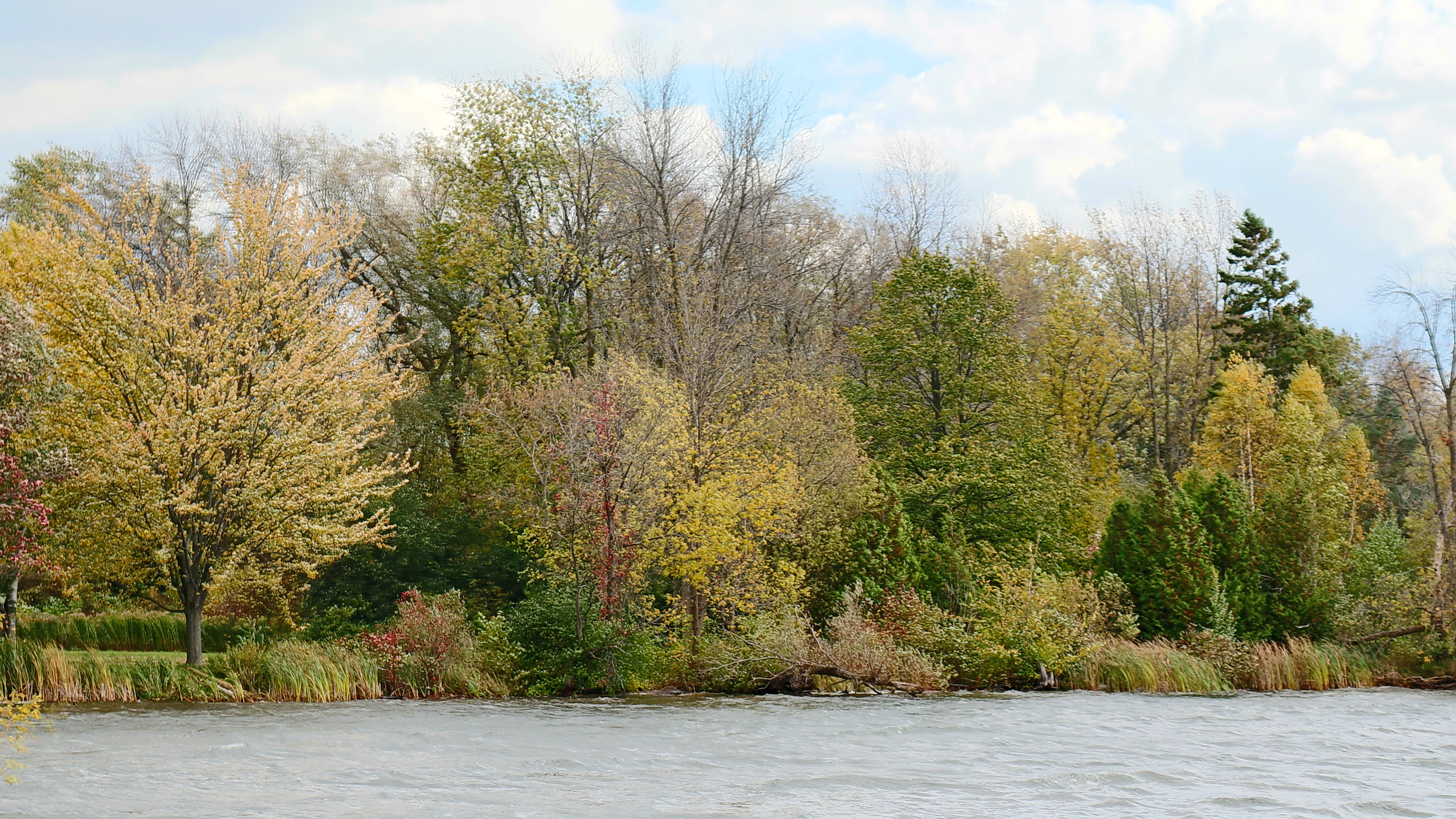
East shore of the lake

In the 1820s, before a dam had been erected at the locks below Little Lake, the Otonabee was shallow and could easily be forded on foot opposite the old steamboat landing beside the Shaw & Fortune steam mill. In 1833 and 1835 L.H. Baird made a survey of the route of what would become the Trent–Severn Waterway connecting Lake Huron to Lake Ontario, and following his recommendation locks were built at Bobcaygeon, Little Lake, Hastings and Chisholm Rapids. Work began on a dam and lock at Whitla's Rapids in 1837, now Scott's Mills lock, where a 3 feet (0.91 m) drop in the river prevented steamers from reaching Little Lake, but proceeded slowly. Construction lasted from 1837 to 1844. Three piers and a boom were completed in 1852 by Public Works Canada.

The Little Lake Cemetery was established in 1850 on what was then called Mole's Point, a promontory jutting into the lake. A joint stock company was formed for the purpose at the initiative of W.S. Conger, which purchased the promontory and laid out the grounds.

John Stephenson of Ashburnham (East City) was one of the first to build canoes other than birchbarks or dugouts in the Peterborough region. Stephenson had a water-powered mill for planing lumber on the east bank of the Otonabee, just north of the present Hunter Street bridge. In 1857 he was watching a regatta on Little Lake when he was struck by the effort needed to portage a dugout. The next year he built a lighter and more streamlined plank and rib canoe.

There was a booming lumber industry around the Kawartha Lakes in the 19th century, using dams and chutes to float the wood down to Lake Ontario for shipment to England and other parts of Europe. In 1867 Ludgate & McDougall had a large steam sawmill built by Samuel Dickson in active operation on the east shore of Little Lake, one of several in the area. The Nassau Mill, 3 miles (4.8 km) upstream from Peterborough, had 130 saws and was the largest in the county. It could cut 90,000 feet (27,000 m) in twelve hours. The sawmills dumped sawdust and other debris into the river, making navigation difficult and killing the fish. Atlantic salmon had been abundant but were now entirely gone. Residents near Little Lake were forced to move away by the noxious odours from decaying wood and rotting fish. The pollution was not brought under control until the 1870s, when Ontario legislature required the saw mills to burn their sawdust.

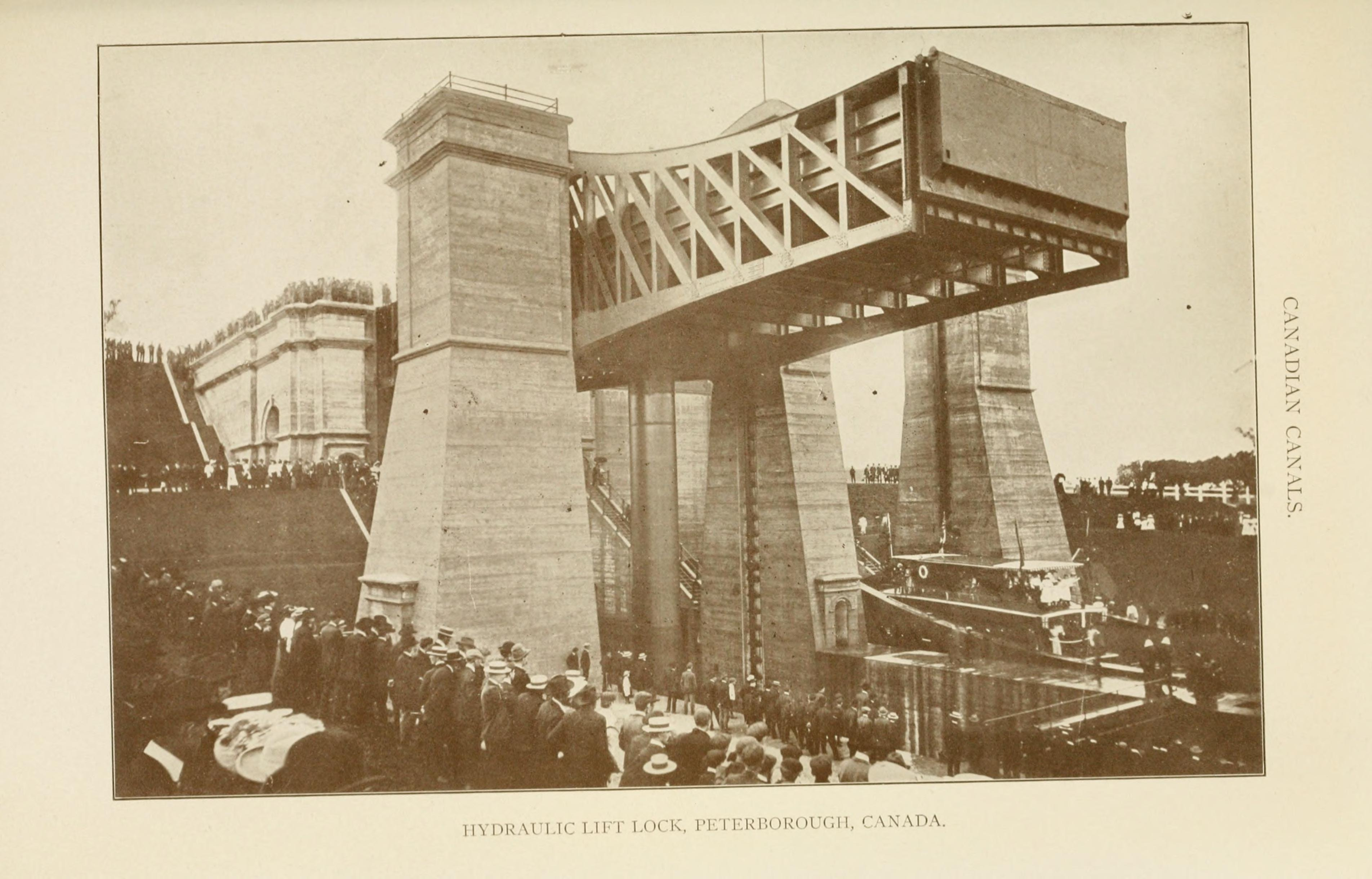
Opening of the Peterborough Lift Lock

In 1868 the lake was described as being 1 mile (1.6 km) in length, 94 miles (151 km) above the mouth of the Trent, navigable for boats with a draft of 4 feet (1.2 m) of water. In 1887 the Mayor of Peterborough petitioned the Governor General of Canada to undertake dredging of Little Lake, which was under the jurisdiction of the Dominion Government and formed part of the Trent Valley Navigation project that was then in progress. The lake had filled up with sawdust and other debris from mills along the Otonabee above the lake over the last forty years. Material dredged from the lake could be used to build up and widen Crescent Street, thus serving a double purpose. The lake was described as a body of water about 1/3 of a mile (0.5 km) across that originally had a depth of 6 to 10 feet (1.8 to 3.0 m).

Canalizing the Otonabee River through a navigable 9 miles (14 km) stretch from Little Lake to Lakefield would open a continuous line of navigable water from Healey Falls to Balsam Lake, and was the subject of much discussion in the 1890s. The route chosen by Richard Birdsall Rogers involved a series of dams and locks on the river south from Lakefield. On the east side at Nassau a 4 miles (6.4 km) excavated canal led to Little Lake. A dam was built across the river at Nassau, and the canal led to a hydraulic lift lock (Peterborough Lift Lock), and then a standard lock at the lower end of the canal where it enters Little Lake.

Centennial Fountain was built to celebrate the 100th anniversary of Canada. It sprays water 76 metres (249 ft) high, making it the highest jet fountain in Canada.

== Water quality ==
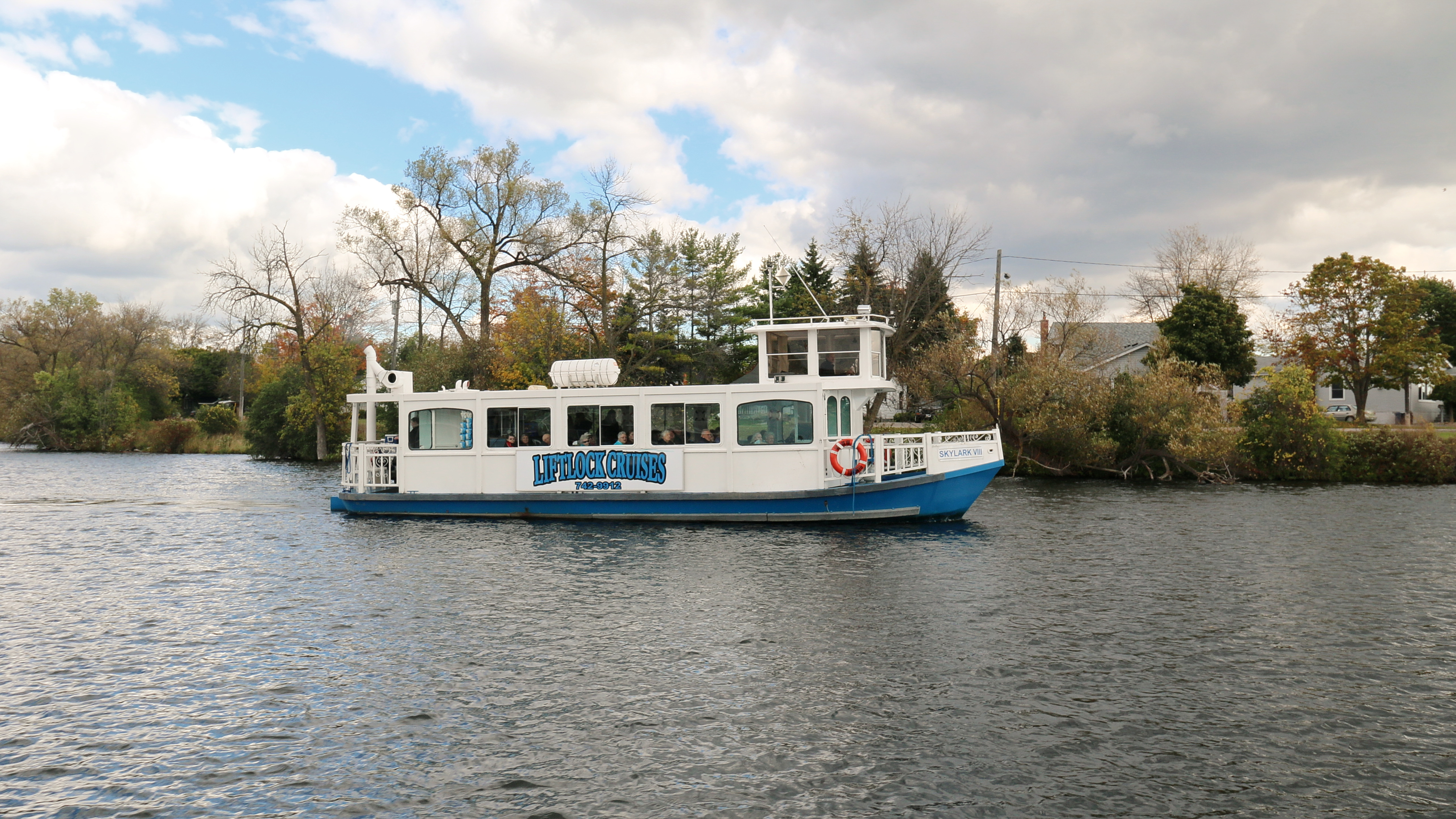
A cruise boat on the lake

Early in the 20th century several large manufacturers moved to Peterborough to take advantage of the hydroelectric power stations built at the north end of Little Lake. These included Johnson Motor Company, Canadian General Electric and Quaker Oats. Various industries disposed of their waste in the river. By 1930 it had been recognized that Little Lake was polluted with industrial chemicals, which killed large numbers of fish in the river.

A 1989 study found that Little Lake, the Otonabee River and Rice Lake were moderately contaminated, and that the polychlorinated biphenyl (PCB) was not fully contained in the sediments as had been thought. The shallow bottom of Little Lake causes rapid flushing, with contaminated sediments swept downstream. PCB levels had been monitored for over 30 years by 2018, and had been declining in Little Lake and in the Trent–Severn Waterway in general. In March 2018 a broken fire-suppression line from the GE plant leaked contaminants into the lake. However, in June 2018 the Peterborough Public Health department said it was safe to swim and catch fish in the lake. Much of the contamination was thought to be in the sediment, where it would not affect people using the lake.

== Sources ==
- Angus, James T. (1998-08-03), A Respectable Ditch: A History of the Trent Severn Waterway, 1833-1920, McGill-Queen's Press - MQUP, ISBN 978-0-7735-1821-6
- Beavermead, Swim Drink Fish Canada
- Canada. House of Commons (1891), Official Reports of the Debates of the House of Commons of the Dominion of Canada, Maclean, Roger & Company
- Canada. Parliament (1890), Sessional Papers of the Parliament of the Dominion of Canada, Printer to the King's Most Excellent Majesty etc.
- Clysdale, Taylor (1 May 2018), "Peterborough Public Health says Little Lake is safe for swimming", Peterborough This Week
- Hodgins, Bruce W.; Hobbs, Margaret (1987-06-30), Nastawgan: The Canadian North by Canoe & Snowshoe, Dundurn, ISBN 978-1-55488-238-0
- Little Lake, Natural Resources Canada
- Little Lake Master Plan - Project Summary, City of Peterborough
- Mulvany, Charles Pelham; Ryan, Charles M. (1884), History of the County of Peterborough, Ontario: Containing a History of the County; History of Haliburton County; Their Townships, Towns, Schools, Churches, Etc.; General and Local Statistics; Biographical Sketches; and an Outline History of the Dominion of Canada, Etc., Etc, C. Blackett Robinson
- "Neat Facts About Little Lake", PTBOCanada, 23 February 2017
- Peterborough Field Naturalists (2011-12-10), Nature in the Kawarthas, Dundurn, ISBN 978-1-4597-0117-5
- Peterborough Marina, Peterborough Marina
- Poole, Thomas W. (1867), A Sketch of the Early Settlement and Subsequent Progress of the Town of Peterborough: And of Each Township in the County of Peterborough, Printed at the office of the Peterborough review
- Replacement of Scotts Mills Dam at Lock 19, Parks Canada, 28 May 2018
- Self-Guided-Tour-brochure (PDF), Little Lake Cemetery Company
- Travaux Publics Canada (1868), Rapport Annuel, The Department
- Tsanis, Ioannis; Wu, Jian; Shen, Huihua; Valeo, Caterina (2007-03-26), Environmental Hydraulics: Hydrodynamic and Pollutant Transport Models of Lakes and Coastal Waters, Elsevier, ISBN 978-0-08-046796-2
- Weafer-Schiarizza, Sera (April 2009), Review of Occupational and Environmental Health Studies in Peterborough, Ontario (PDF), Trent University
