= Katchewanooka Lake =

Lake in Ontario, Canada

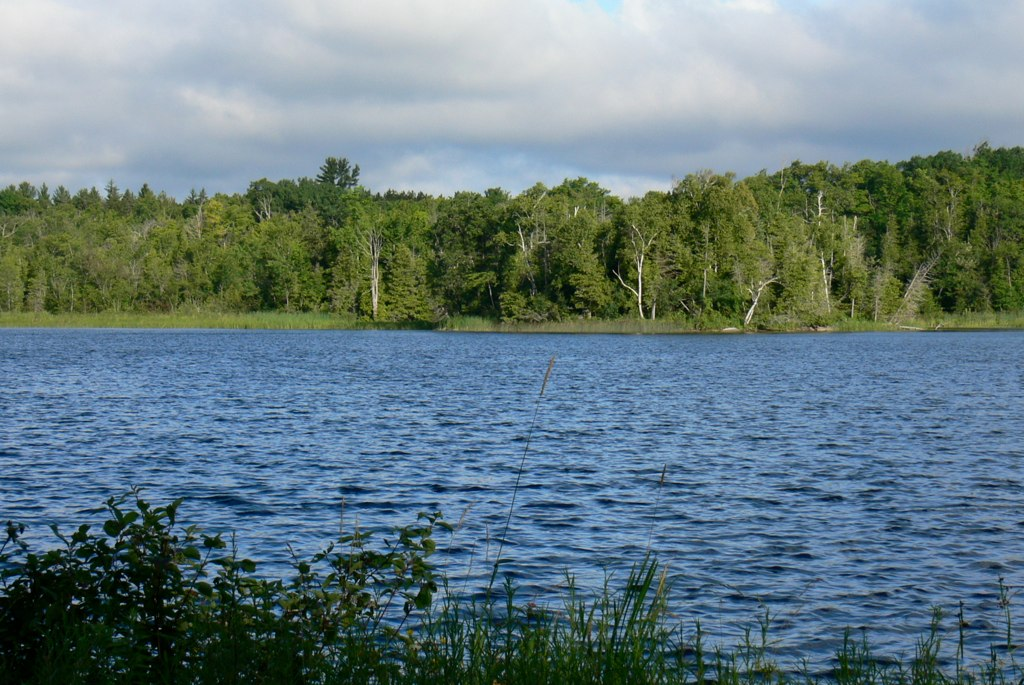

- Location within Ontario
- Location: Peterborough County, Ontario
- Group: Kawartha lakes
- Coordinates: 44°27′N 78°16′W
- Primary inflows: Stoney Lake
- Primary outflows: Otonabee River
- Basin countries: Canada
- Max. length: 5 mi (8.0 km)
- Max. width: 0.5 mi (0.80 km)
- Max. depth: 50 ft (15 m)
- Surface elevation: 233 m (764 ft)

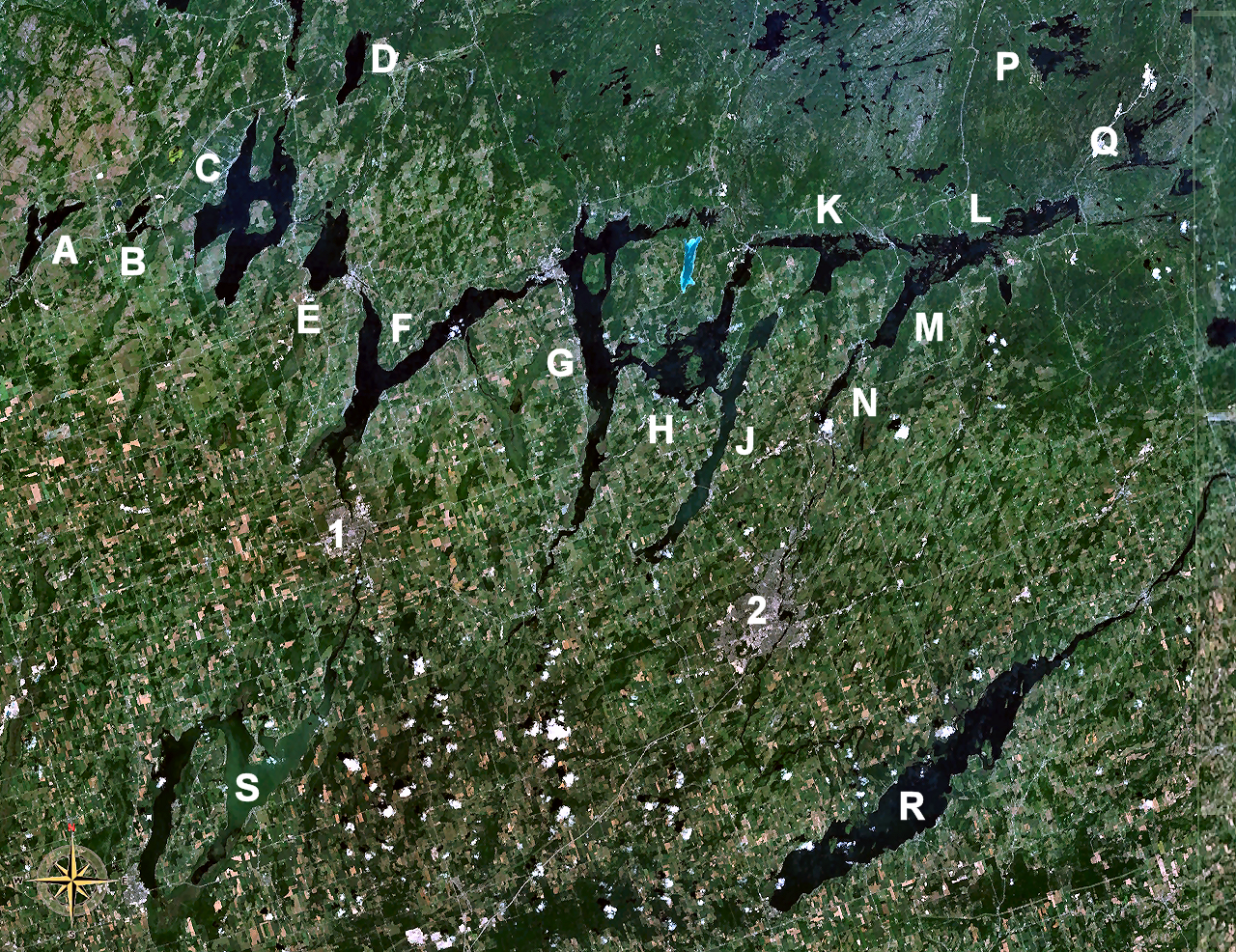
The Kawartha lakes with Katchewanooka Lake (N).

Katchewanooka Lake is one of the Kawartha lakes in south-central Ontario, Canada. It is about 5 miles (8.0 km) long and .5 miles (0.80 km) wide. The Trent Severn Waterway flows through Lake Katchewanooka into the Otonabee River at its outlet just north of Lakefield, continuing southwest through Little Lake in Peterborough and on into Rice Lake. Lakefield College School lies on the east side of the lake.

Susanna Moodie, author of Roughing it in the Bush (1852), lived on a farm on the lake in the 1830s.

Canadian author Cathy Pelletier aka K. C. McKinnon was inspired by this lake to write her novel "Dancing at the Harvest Moon" (1997).

Although water levels in this lake and others in the Kawartha Lakes system are controlled to some extent by locks and dams, the lakeshore is vulnerable to flooding during the spring run-off period.

== See also ==
- List of lakes in Ontario
