= Camborne (disambiguation) =

Camborne is a town in Cornwall, not to be confused with Cambourne, a new town near Cambridge.

Camborne may also refer to:

- Camborne Hill
- Camborne School of Mines
- Camborne, British Columbia
- Camborne, New Zealand
- Camborne, Ontario
- Camborne (UK Parliament constituency)

== See also ==
- Cambourne, settlement in Cambridgeshire
