= Jackson Creek (Peterborough, Ontario) =

- Location of the mouth of the creek in southern Ontario

Location
- Country: Canada
- Province: Ontario
- Region: Central Ontario
- Municipality: Peterborough

Physical characteristics
- Mouth: Otonabee River
  - coordinates: 44°17′49″N 78°19′09″W
  - elevation: 189 m (620 ft)

Basin features
- River system: Great Lakes Basin

Jackson Creek is a creek in Peterborough, Ontario, Canada. It is part of the Great Lakes Basin, and flows to its mouth at Little Lake as a right tributary of the Otonabee River. The Otonabee flows via the Trent River to Lake Ontario.

In 1963 the Otonabee Region Conservation Authority received a grant for construction of a dam on Jackson Creek. The creek overflowed in July 2004, causing extensive damage.

== See also ==
- List of rivers of Ontario
