= Otonabee River =

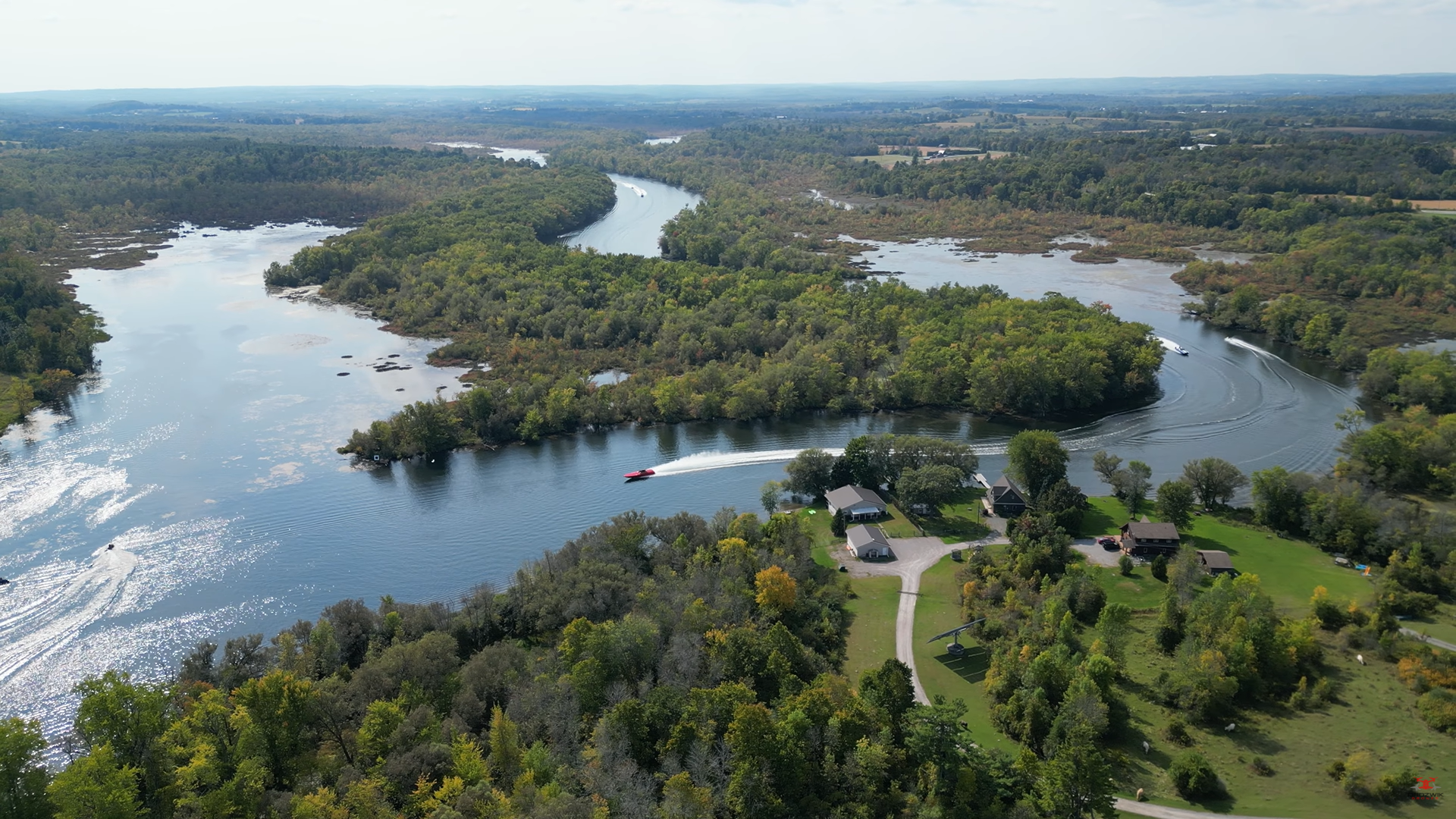
- The Otonabee River in Bensfort Bridge, Ontario

- Location of the mouth of the Otonabee River in southern Ontario
- Etymology: From the Ojibwe Odoonabii-ziibi, meaning Tullibee River
- Native name: Odoonabii-ziibi' (Ojibwe)

Location
- Country: Canada
- Province: Ontario
- Region: Central Ontario
- County: Peterborough
- Cities: Lakefield; Peterborough

Physical characteristics
- Source: Katchewanooka Lake
  - location: Selwyn
  - coordinates: 44°25′54″N 78°16′19″W
  - elevation: 233 m (764 ft)
- Mouth: Rice Lake
  - location: Otonabee–South Monaghan
  - coordinates: 44°09′14″N 78°13′52″W
  - elevation: 187 m (614 ft)
- Length: 55 km (34 mi)
- Basin size: 806 km^{2} (311 sq mi)

Basin features
- River system: Great Lakes Basin

The Otonabee River is a river in Peterborough County in Central Ontario, Canada. The river flows from Katchewanooka Lake, at the north end of the community of Lakefield, through the city of Peterborough to Rice Lake. It is in the Great Lakes Basin and forms part of the Trent-Severn Waterway.

== Etymology ==
The river is called Odoonabii-ziibi in the Ojibwe language. Otonabee comes from the words ode which means "heart" and odemgat that comes from "boiling water". It translates into "the river that beats like a heart in reference to the bubbling and boiling water of the rapids along the river".

== Course ==
The river begins at Katchewanooka Lake on the north side of the community of Lakefield in the municipality of Selwyn, and flows south over the Lakefield (Trent-Severn lock 26) dams and locks. After leaving the community to the Peterborough city limits, the river forms the border between Selwyn and the municipality of Douro–Dummer. The river continues south, passing through the dams associated with four more locks, enters the city of Peterborough, and passes under Faryon Bridge at Trent University. Just south of the university, the Trent-Severn departs via a south-bound canal to the Peterborough Lift Lock east of the river, while the river continues south to the west. It passes over several hydroelectricity dams and generating stations, and passes into the centre of the city of Peterborough, as close as 150 metres (490 ft) to downtown, as it reaches Little Lake. The Trent-Severn waterway rejoins the river there, exiting from Ashburnham Lock. The river leaves Little Lake at Scotts Mills lock & dam, and heads south, passes under Ontario Highway 7, passes into the municipality of Otonabee–South Monaghan, and snakes its way without any other locks or dams to reach its mouth at Rice Lake, which flows via the Trent River to Lake Ontario.

The total length of the river is 55 kilometres (34 mi), and the distance from Little Lake to Rice Lake about 30 kilometres (19 mi). The drainage basin, not including Katchewanooka Lake or other lakes further upstream, is 806 square kilometres (311 sq mi).

== Hydrology ==
Some areas of Peterborough along the Otonabee are prone to flooding following heavy rains, such as happened on July 15, 2004 when 240 mm (7.3 in) fell in some locations in under twenty-four hours.

== History ==
Both Susanna Moodie and Catharine Parr Traill lived on farms near Katchewanooka Lake.

== Economy ==
Trent University operates its own hydroelectric plant on the river.

== Islands ==
Cow Island is located to the west of the mouth of the Otonabee River.

== Tributaries ==
- Steamboat Creek (right)
- Kent Creek (left)
- Squirrel Creek (right)
- Lepers Creek (right)
- Baxter Creek (right)
- Cavan Creek (right)
- Meade Creek (left)
- Whitlaw Creek (left)
- Jackson Creek (right)
- Sawer Creek (left)
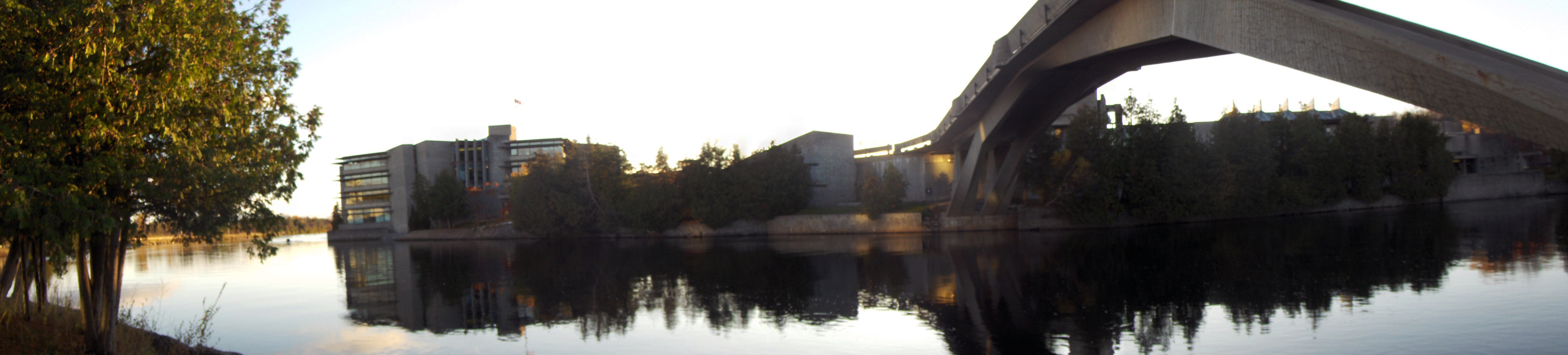
A view across the Otonabee river in Peterborough, Ontario, showing a part of the campus of Trent University. The Faryon bridge is to the right.

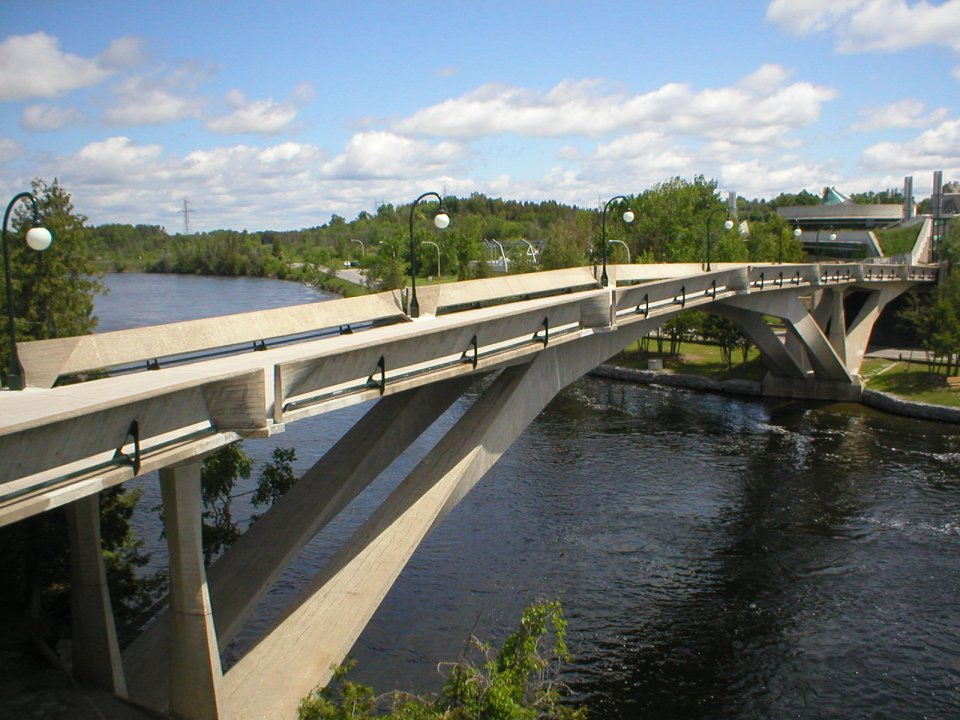
Another view of the Faryon Bridge (reverse angle from previous), connecting the east and west banks of the Otonabee River

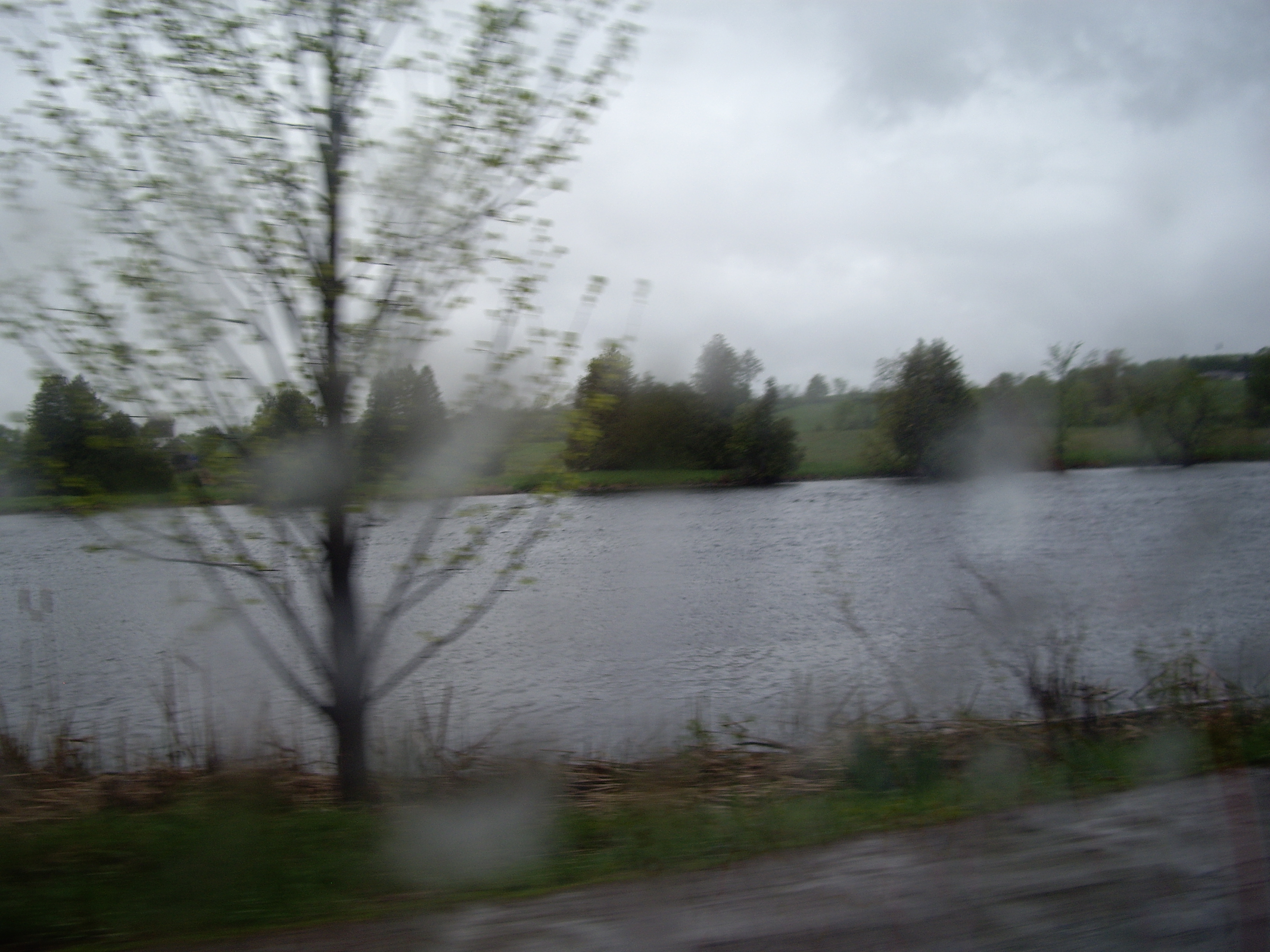
Otonabee River as it flows past Peterborough County Road 32

== See also ==
- List of Ontario rivers

== Sources ==
- Map 6 (PDF) (Map). 1 : 700,000. Official road map of Ontario. Ministry of Transportation of Ontario. 2014.
- Restructured municipalities - Ontario map #5 (Map). Restructuring Maps of Ontario. Ontario Ministry of Municipal Affairs and Housing. 2006. Archived from the original on 2020-05-11.
