= Cow Island (Ontario) =

Island in Rice Lake, Ontario, Canada

Cow
- Interactive map of Cow

Geography
- Location: Rice Lake
- Coordinates: 44°8′43″N 78°14′58″W

Administration
- Canada
- Province: Ontario
- Township: Otonabee-South Monaghan

Cow Island is an island on Rice Lake in Ontario, Canada, just west of the mouth of the Otonabee River.

There are approximately 50 privately owned lots of land on the island. The majority of settlements on Cow are located on the north and west parts of the island, as much of the east is marsh, and cannot be easily accessed by boat.

== History ==
Cow Island was once a marshy peninsula. In 1819, the southern section was called Fothergill Point. It was the location of Charles Fothergill's hunting lodge, Castle Fothergill. It was renamed Jubilee Point in 1887, by steamboat entrepreneur Henry Calcutt, to honour the 50th anniversary of Queen Victoria's reign. The island was named for the Cow (now Cowie) family of Hiawatha. Other places in Peterborough County have been named for members of this family, such as Jack's Lake near Apsley, named for "Handsome" Jack Cow, and Polly Cow Island below Young's Point, named for his daughter. In 1867, part of Cow Island, along with others mentioned, was purchased by Alfred Harris. It has always been a popular spot to trap muskrats. It is said that Rice Lake muskrats possess the finest skins in the world. Victor Harris, a great-great grandson of Alfred Harris carries on the operation of the Rice Lake Fur Company at this location.

The early Mississauga name for Rice Lake was Pem-e-dash-cou-tay-ang or Lake of the Burning Plains. This refers to the hunting grounds on the southern shore where native peoples burned the vegetation each spring to encourage the growth of a type of grass relished by deer. The Mississaugas, according to records "by a provisional treaty signed on November 5, 1818, and later confirmed, surrendered a large tract of land to the British Crown, including the Otonabee region." When the native settlements of the Rice Lake Indian Village (later Hiawatha) and Alderville (named for the Rev. Robert Alder, English secretary of the Wesleyan Missionary Society) were established in 1829 and 1837, respectively, the colonial government referred to the Rice Lake islands by number. The Mississauga's influence, however, is evident in some of the names of the islands such as Cow, Paudash and Sugar, named by and for native people. Most retain these names today.

Several of the present islands, particularly near the northern shoreline, were former marshy peninsulas. These peninsulas became flooded during the construction of the Trent Canal system starting in 1838 when a dam was built at Hastings. It is said the present lake level is about six feet higher than earlier. In 1913, compensation was given by King George V to some owners for damage caused by the Trent Canal.

Around 1867, according to Registry Office records, the superintendent-general of Indian Affairs, on behalf of the Crown, began to sell the Rice Lake islands. A few were retained by the Crown and reserved for the native peoples. The proceeds from some sales were to benefit the Alnwick or Alderville natives and some the Mississaugas of the Rice Lake Indian Village and Mud Lake.

== Islands of Rice Lake ==
Cow Island is one of several islands on Rice Lake. Other islands include: Black, Foley (Upper and Lower), Grasshopper, Grape (East and West), Harmony, Harris, Hickory, Long, Margaret, Paudaush or Paudash, Rack, Sheep, Spook or Spooke, Sugar (East and West), Tic, and White's.

== Web site ==
Official web site for Cow Island, including portal for owners: cowisland.ca

There is also a Facebook fan page for Cow Island, Rice Lake:
