= Bewdley, Ontario =

Bewdley
- compact rural community
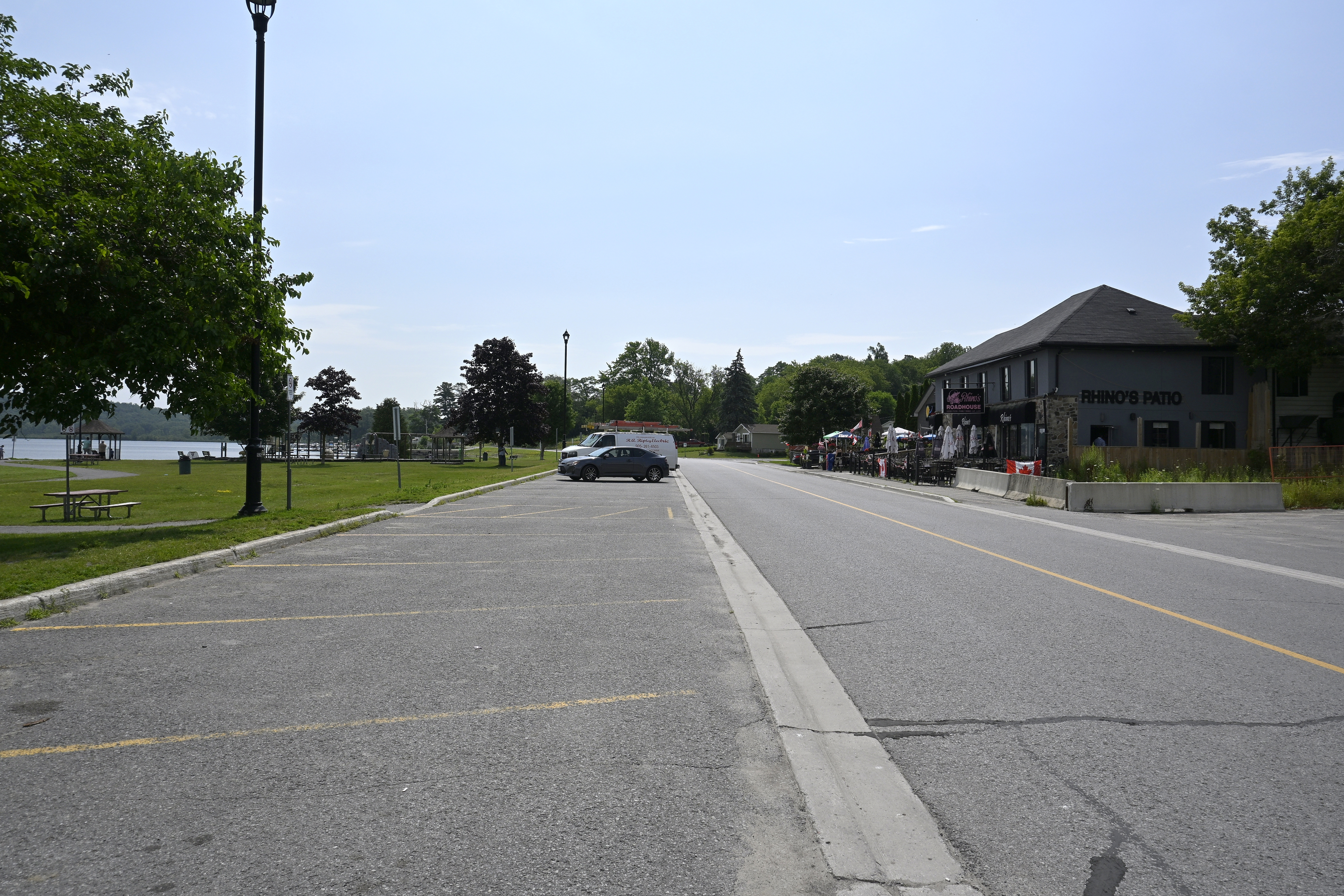
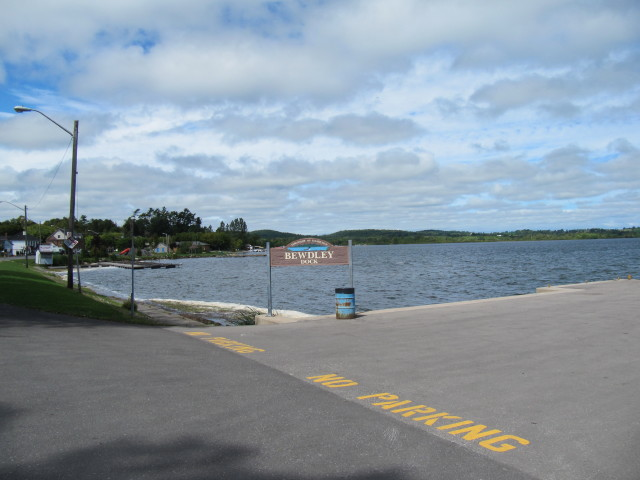
- Rice Lake Drive Bewdley Dock on Rice Lake
- Map of Rice Lake and Hamilton Township
- Location of Bewdley in southern Ontario
- Coordinates: 44°05′16″N 78°19′17″W
- Country: Canada
- Province: Ontario
- County: Northumberland
- Municipality: Hamilton Township
- First settled: 1794
- Present name: 1833
- Elevation: 193 m (633 ft)
- Time zone: UTC-5 (Eastern Time Zone)
  - Summer (DST): UTC-4 (Eastern Time Zone)
- Postal code: K0L 1E0

Bewdley is a compact rural community in the township municipality of Hamilton, Northumberland County, Ontario, Canada,. The community was founded by William Bancks, whose ancestral home was Bewdley in England. It is located on the western end of Rice Lake about 15 kilometres (9 mi) north of Port Hope.

== History ==
The area was inhabited by the Mississauga Anishinaabeg prior to the town's foundation. The first land grant was in 1794 to Nellie Grant, the daughter of a colonial administrator. Bewdley originated in the 1820s as Black's Landing, named for local tavern owner William Black. Early on, there were sawmills which drove settlement in the area.

The development of Bewdley is mostly credited to William Banks, who purchased several lots in 1831. He then laid out residential plots for a village he named Bewdley after is home town in Worcestershire, England.

The town is known for its monument to Joseph M. Scriven, writer of the hymn "What a Friend We Have in Jesus". He preached upon the village streets around the 1860s, and is buried nearby.

== Community ==
The Bewdley Community Centre is located in Bewdley and contains an arena, meeting rooms and halls, one baseball diamond, and an outdoor multi-purpose court. Also located at the Bewdley Community Centre is the Bewdley Public Library which operates as a satellite branch of the Cobourg Public Library.

Optimist Park is a waterfront park located on the southwest shore of Rice Lake. There is a play structure and picnic tables available. It is located near the Bewdley Docks which is a popular spot for water recreation activities such as boating and fishing.

Bewdley has a fire station run by the Township of Hamilton Fire Department. The station protects the northwest corner of Hamilton Township.

Located on the outskirts of Bewdley is Rice Lake Conservation area which is managed by the Ganaraska Region Conservation Authority. The area was acquired in 1972, with the purpose of protecting a large portion of the provincially significant wetland, Bewdley Marsh. It contains a trail that leads to the waterfront and areas for passive recreation
