= Camborne, Ontario =

Camborne
- Dispersed Rural Community
- Etymology: Named for Camborne in Cornwall, England, itself from the Cornish Cambron, 'Crooked Hill'
- Location of Camborne in Southern Ontario
- Coordinates: 44°02′14″N 78°13′10″W
- Country: Canada
- Province: Ontario
- County: Northumberland
- Municipality: Hamilton Township
- Elevation: 181 m (594 ft)
- Time zone: UTC−05:00 (EST)
  - Summer (DST): UTC−04:00 (EDT)
- Postal code FSA: K9A
- Area codes: 905, 289, 365
- CGNDB key: FANXH

Camborne is an unincorporated place and dispersed rural community in Hamilton Township, Northumberland County in Central Ontario, Canada. It is located on County Road 18 about 6.5 km (4 mi) north of Ontario Highway 401 exit 472 and 10 km (6 mi) north of Cobourg.

== History ==
Camborne was established during the 1830s by William Hore who emigrated from Camborne, Cornwall, England. Hore is often proclaimed by residents as the "First Mayor of Camborne", he established homes, a sawmill, the community's first church, side roads, and a pail and tub factory.

Camborne is home to the Old Camborne School House, a one-room schoolhouse built in 1895 and restored in 1995. It is a designated property and remains the only one-room school left in the township that has not been sold or renovated into a private residence.

== Community ==
Camborne is a dispersed rural community with agricultural roots. The municipal office for the Township of Hamilton is located in Camborne.

Camborne Public School, an elementary school (JK - 6) that is managed by the Kawartha Pine Ridge District School Board, is also located in the village. The original one-room school is maintained as an active community space and designated heritage site. Beside the Old Camborne School House is Camborne Park. It is equipped with a play structure, multi-purpose court, and benches.
