= Rice Lake (Ontario) =

Lake in Ontario, Canada

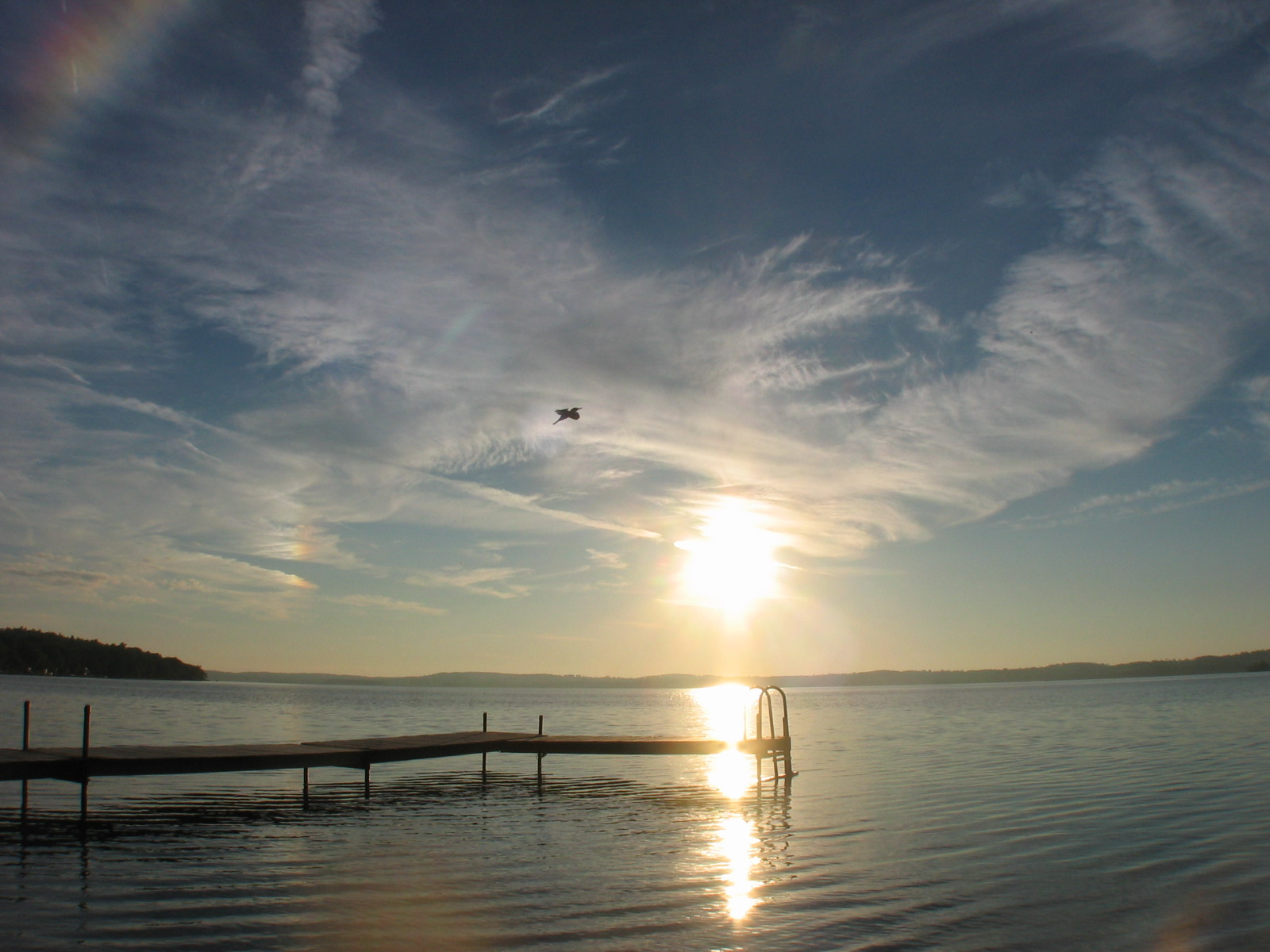
- Sunset

- Location within Southern Ontario
- Location: Ontario
- Group: south of Kawartha lakes (Ontario)
- Coordinates: 44°11′N 78°10′W
- Primary inflows: Otonabee River
- Primary outflows: Trent River
- Basin countries: Canada
- Max. length: 32 km (20 mi)
- Max. width: 5 km (3.1 mi)
- Max. depth: 27 ft (8.2 m)
- Surface elevation: 187 m (614 ft)
- Islands: Cow
- Settlements: Bewdley, Gores Landing, Hastings, Bailieboro, Roseneath

Rice Lake is a lake located in Northumberland and Peterborough counties in south-eastern Ontario. The lake is located south of the city of Peterborough, and the Kawartha Lakes and north of Cobourg. It is part of the Trent-Severn Waterway, which flows into the lake by the Otonabee and out via the Trent. The lake is 28 kilometres (17 miles) long and 5 km wide. Its maximum depth is 10m, with a surface water level at 187 m above sea level, raised to its present height by the Hastings Dam, built in the 19th century as part of the Trent-Severn canal system. The Indigenous Mississaugas called it Pemadashdakota or "lake of the burning plains".

A drumlin field is located northwest of the lake, and the lake's islands are partially submerged drumlins. Rice Lake nearly bisects the Oak Ridges Moraine, with three wedges to the west (Albion, Uxbridge and Pontypool), and one wedge to the east (Rice Lake) which has terminus at the Trent River. A narrow corridor to the south of Rice Lake connects these wedges.

Rice Lake is fairly shallow and was named for the wild rice which grew in it and was harvested by native people of the area. Most of the extensive stands of wild rice originally found in here were wiped out when water levels were raised in the lake by the construction of the waterway.

The village of Bewdley sits on the west end of the lake and the town of Hastings sits on the east. Prehistoric burial mounds are found at Serpent Mounds Park on the north shore of the lake. Other places of interest include the Indian reserves of Alderville and Hiawatha. Other communities include Roseneath, Bailieboro, Gores Landing, Keene, Ontario and Harwood.

== Railway bridge ==
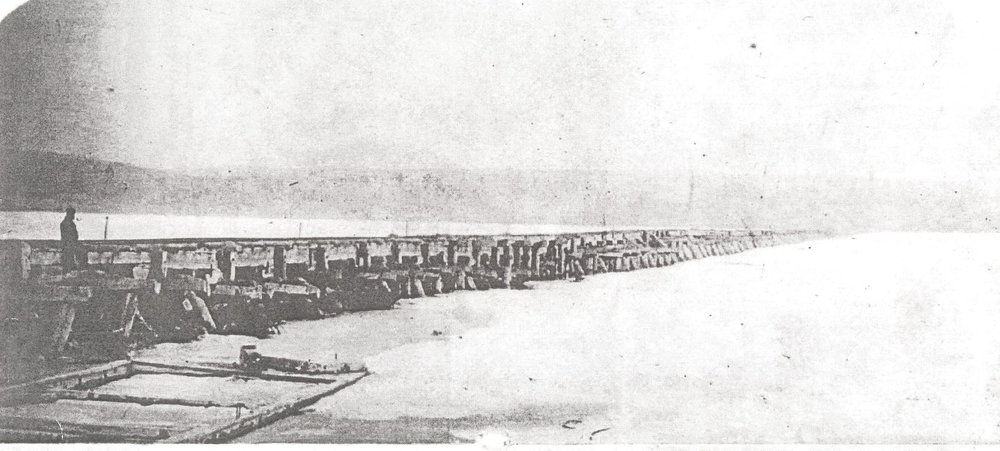
Cobourg and Peterborough Railway bridge on Rice Lake, which was built in 1854 and lasted only six years.

The Cobourg and Peterborough Railway was completed in 1854 and crossed Rice Lake from Harwood to Hiawatha on a 4 kilometres (2.5 miles) line of wooden trestles. However, the thick layers of ice that covered the lake in the winter damaged the bridge beyond repair and it was declared unsafe and closed within six years. Sections of the railway bed are still clearly visible on the south side of the lake. In the late 19th century, both before and after the railway bridge, steamboats provided both passenger and goods services, which could navigate up the Otonabee River as far as Peterborough.

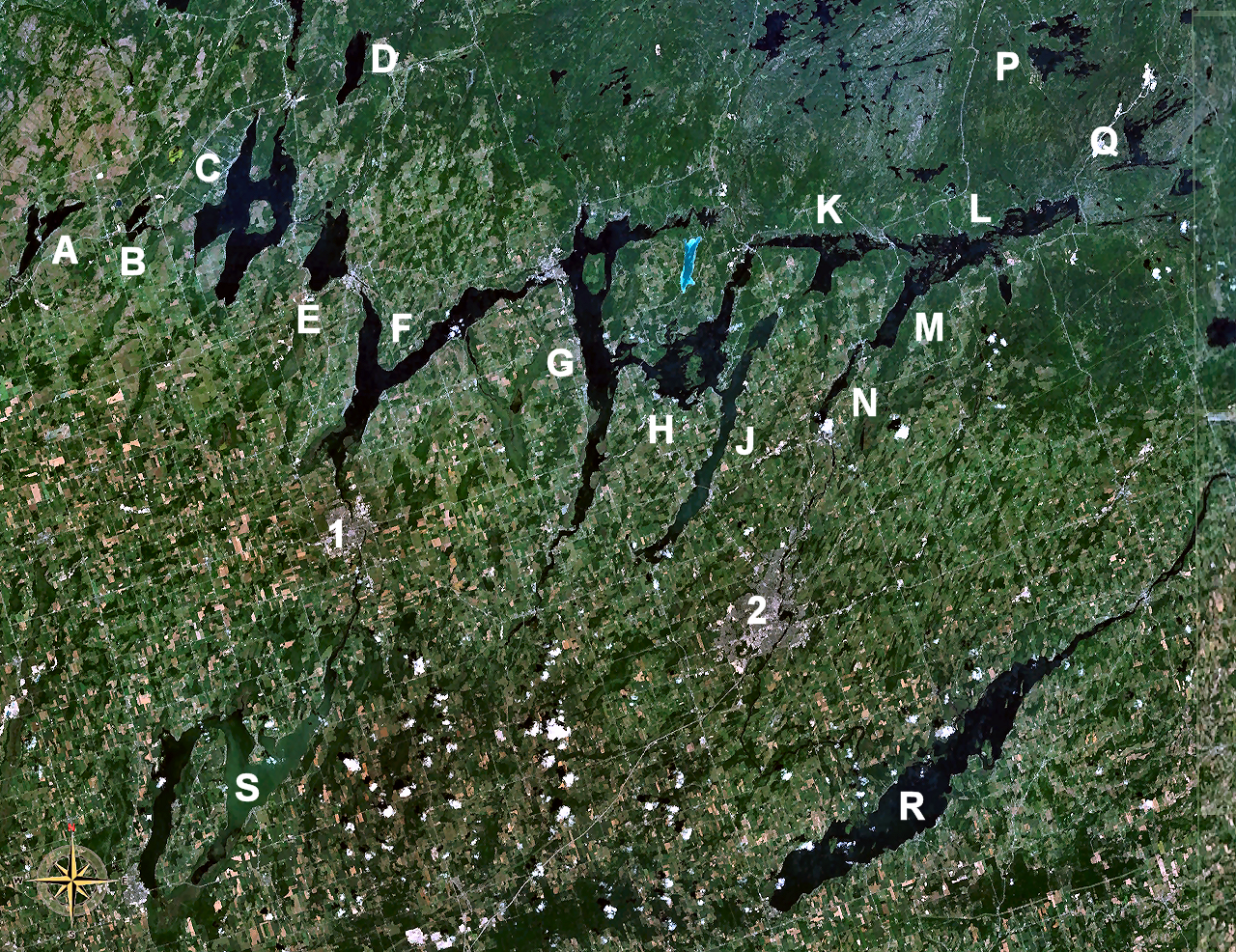
The Kawartha lakes with Rice Lake in the lower right, marked "R".

== Tourism and fishing ==
After the bridge failed, the Cobourg railway continued to run to Harwood. As well as lumber, the railway found a new use bringing iron ore from the Marmora quarries further east. These were brought by barge up the Trent and along Rice Lake, before being loaded on wagons and taken to the harbour at Cobourg. As Cobourg developed as a tourist town, the railway also brought recreational fishermen up to Rice Lake.

Rice Lake is now an attractive tourist area and is recognized for its recreational and sport fisheries. Rice Lake fish include panfish, walleye, muskellunge and bass. In addition to recreational fishing, a number of annual fishing contests are held here.

An annual charity poker run boat race starting from Bewdley is held the first Saturday after Labour Day, with proceeds going to the Children's Wish Foundation.

== Islands of Rice Lake ==
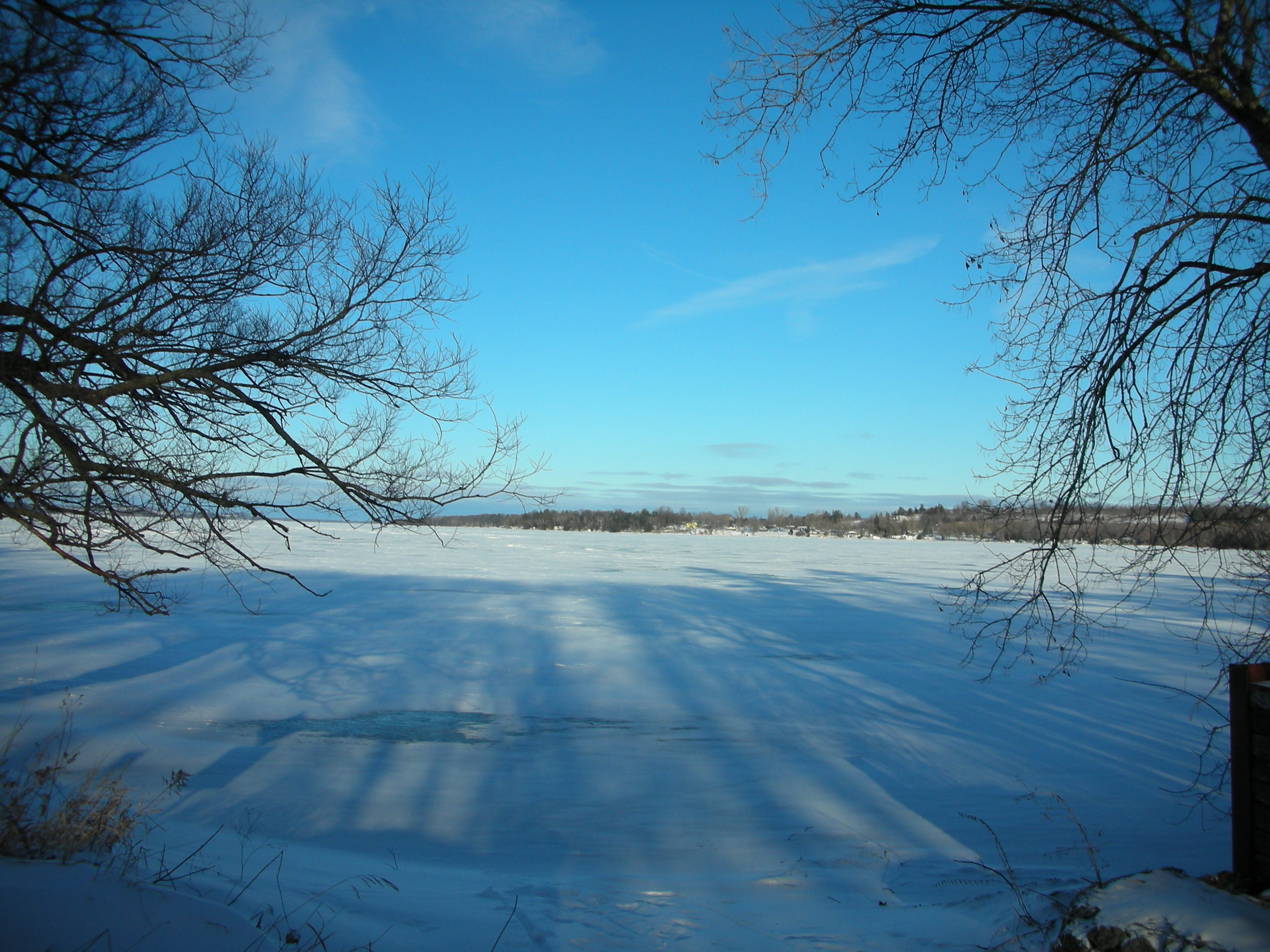
Ice on Rice Lake, seen from Courtis Point.

Islands in the lake include: Coughlins Island, Cow Island, Black Island, Foley Island (Upper and Lower), Grasshopper Island, Grape Island (East and West), Harmony Island, Harris Island, Hickory Island, Long Island, Margaret Island, Muskrat Island, Paudaush Island, Rack Island, Scriver Island, Sheep Island, Spook Island, Sugar Island (East and West), Tic Island, and White's Island.
