= 2014 Peterborough County municipal elections =

Local election in Ontario, Canada

Elections were held in Peterborough County, Ontario on October 27, 2014 in conjunction with municipal elections across the province.

== Peterborough County Council ==
Peterborough County Council consists of two members from each of the county's constituent municipalities.

Position	Elected
Asphodel-Norwood Mayor	Terry Low
Asphodel-Norwood Deputy Mayor	Rodger Bonneau
Cavan Monaghan Mayor	Scott McFadden
Cavan Monaghan Deputy Mayor	John Fallis
Douro-Dummer Mayor	James Murray Jones (acclaimed)
Douro-Dummer Deputy Mayor	Karl Moher (acclaimed)
Havelock-Belmont-Methuen Mayor	Ronald Gerow (acclaimed)
Havelock-Belmont-Methuen Deputy Mayor	Jim Martin
North Kawartha Mayor	Rick Woodcock
North Kawartha Deputy Mayor	Doug Hutton
Otonabee-South Monaghan Reeve	Dave Nelson (acclaimed)
Otonabee-South Monaghan Deputy Reeve	Joe Taylor (acclaimed)
Selwyn Mayor	Mary Smith
Selwyn Deputy Mayor	Sherry Senis (acclaimed)
Trent Lakes Mayor	Bev Matthews
Trent Lakes Deputy Mayor	Ronald Windover

== Asphodel-Norwood ==
Mayoral Candidate	Vote	%
Terry Low	992	52.49
Doug Pearcy (X)	898	47.51

== Cavan-Monaghan ==
Mayoral Candidate	Vote	%
Scott McFadden	2,273	65.37
Jim Chaplin	1,098	31.58
David Eric McLean	106	3.05

== Douro-Dummer ==
Mayoral Candidate	Vote	%
James Murray Jones (X)	Acclaimed	

== Havelock-Belmont-Methuen ==
Mayoral Candidate	Vote	%
Ronald Gerow (X)	Acclaimed	

== North Kawartha ==
Mayoral Candidate	Vote	%
Rick Woodcock	1,604	51.93
Jim Whelan (X)	1,485	48.07

== Otonabee-South Monaghan ==
Reeve Candidate	Vote	%
Dave Nelson (X)	Acclaimed	

== Selwyn ==
Mayoral Candidate	Vote	%
Mary Smith (X)	4,901	79.46
Arthur Tarala	1,267	20.54

== Trent Lakes ==
Mayoral Candidate	Vote	%
Bev Matthews	2,237	53.66
Janet Clarkson (X)	1,932	46.34
