= Ontario Highway 28 =

Ontario provincial highway

Highway 28

Route information
- Maintained by the Ministry of Transportation of Ontario
- Length: 162.6 km (101.0 mi)

Major junctions
- South end: Highway 7 near Peterborough
- East end: Highway 41 at Denbigh

Location
- Country: Canada
- Province: Ontario

Highway system
- Ontario provincial highways; Current; Former; 400-series
← Highway 27	→ Highway 33
Former provincial highways
Highway 29 →

King's Highway 28, commonly referred to as Highway 28, is a provincially maintained highway in the Canadian province of Ontario. The southwest–northeast route extends from Highway 7 east of Peterborough, to Highway 41 in Denbigh. The route passes over undulating hills before entering the Canadian Shield near Burleigh Falls, and gradually turns eastward.

Highway 28 was assigned in 1928, incorporating Highway 12A, one of the original provincial highways. It was extended in the following decade, first to Apsley and then to a new Department of Roads and Northern Development centre in Bancroft. In the early 1980s, Highway 500 was added as an extension, reaching Denbigh. Portions of the highway were decommissioned or transferred in the 1990s, and in 2003 Highway 134 was added, extending the southern terminus to Highway 7.

== Route description ==
Highway 28 north of its southern terminus at Highway 7

Highway 28 begins at an intersection with Highway 7 approximately 7 kilometres (4.3 mi) east of Peterborough. The road that carries Highway 28 continues south as Peterborough County Road 34 (Heritage Line). Proceeding north, Highway 28 crosses the Peterborough Drumlin Field, an area dominated by undulating terrain oriented in a southwest–northeast direction. Despite this, the highway progresses due north without regard for the terrain; numerous cuts and fills have since flattened the route for easier travel. Passing east of Lakefield, the straight path of the route is interrupted by the Otonabee River; it curves northeast and intersects Peterborough County Road 29 (Queen Street) and Road 6 while travelling south of the river. At Young's Point, the southern tip of Stony Lake, the highway crosses the river and serves cottages along the western shore of the lake. Approximately 1 kilometre (0.62 mi) south of Burleigh Falls, the route descends a hill and enters the Canadian Shield; south of this point, the terrain is underlain by limestone and covered by deciduous forests, whereas north of it the terrain is dominated by exposed granite bedrock and coniferous forests.

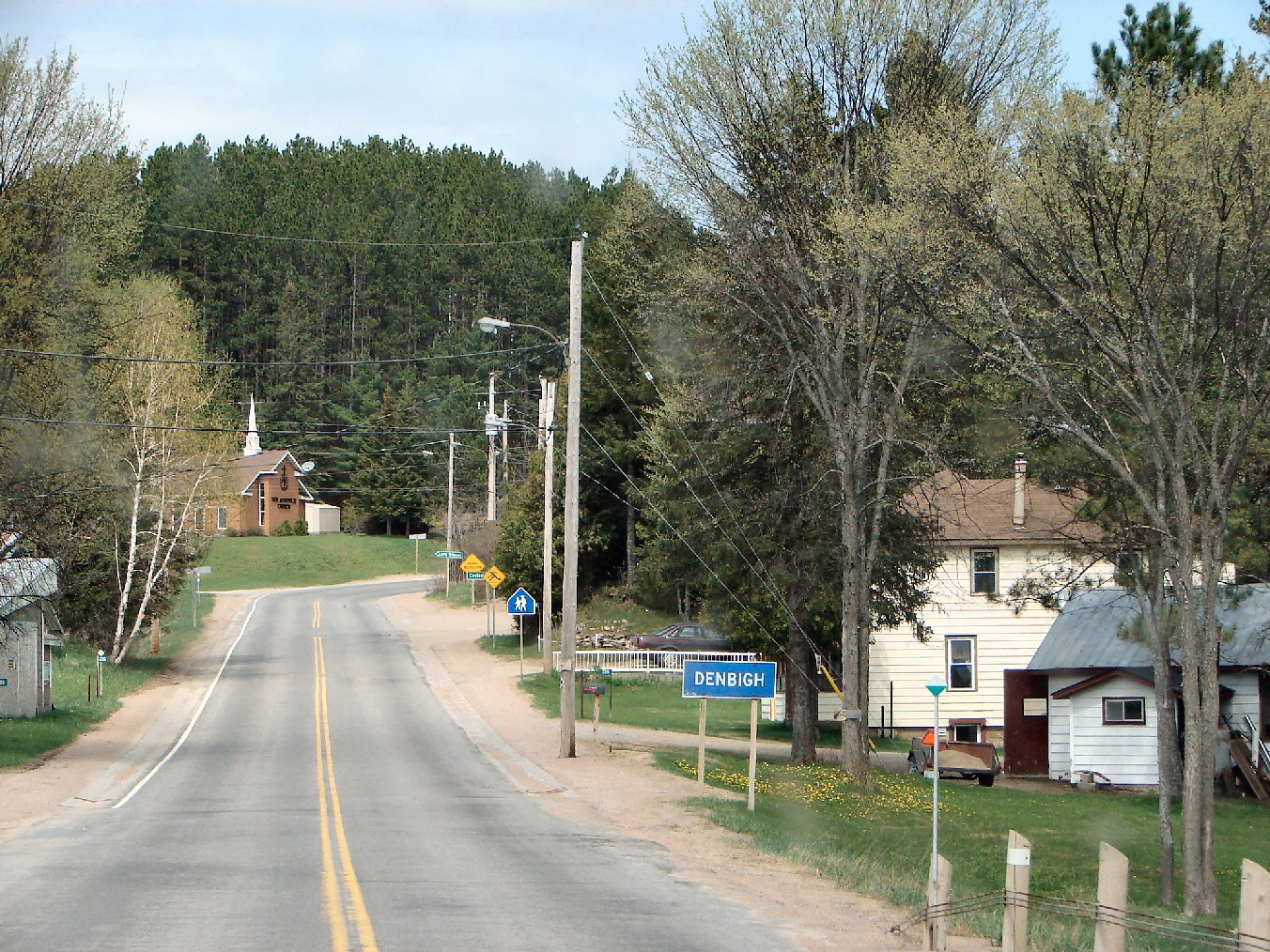
The northeastern end of Highway 28 in Denbigh

Within Burleigh Falls, Highway 28 encounters the eastern terminus of the former Highway 36. From there, it continues northeast through the rugged shield to Highway 118, at which point it has curved fully to the east. The highway passes through Bancroft, where it encounters Highway 62. East of Bancroft, there is relatively little human inhabitation, with the exception of a select group of communities located on or nearby the highway. After entering the community of Denbigh, Highway 28 ends at a junction with Highway 41.

== History ==
Highway 28 was assigned in 1928, when the entirety of Highway 12A was renumbered. Highway 12A was one of the original provincial highways assumed in 1919 and 1920. The Port Hope – Peterborough Road was assumed by the Department of Highways on August 11, 1920, extending from Highway 2 (Walton Street) in Port Hope to Highway 7 (George Street North) in downtown Peterborough. The route received the 12A numbering during the summer of 1925.

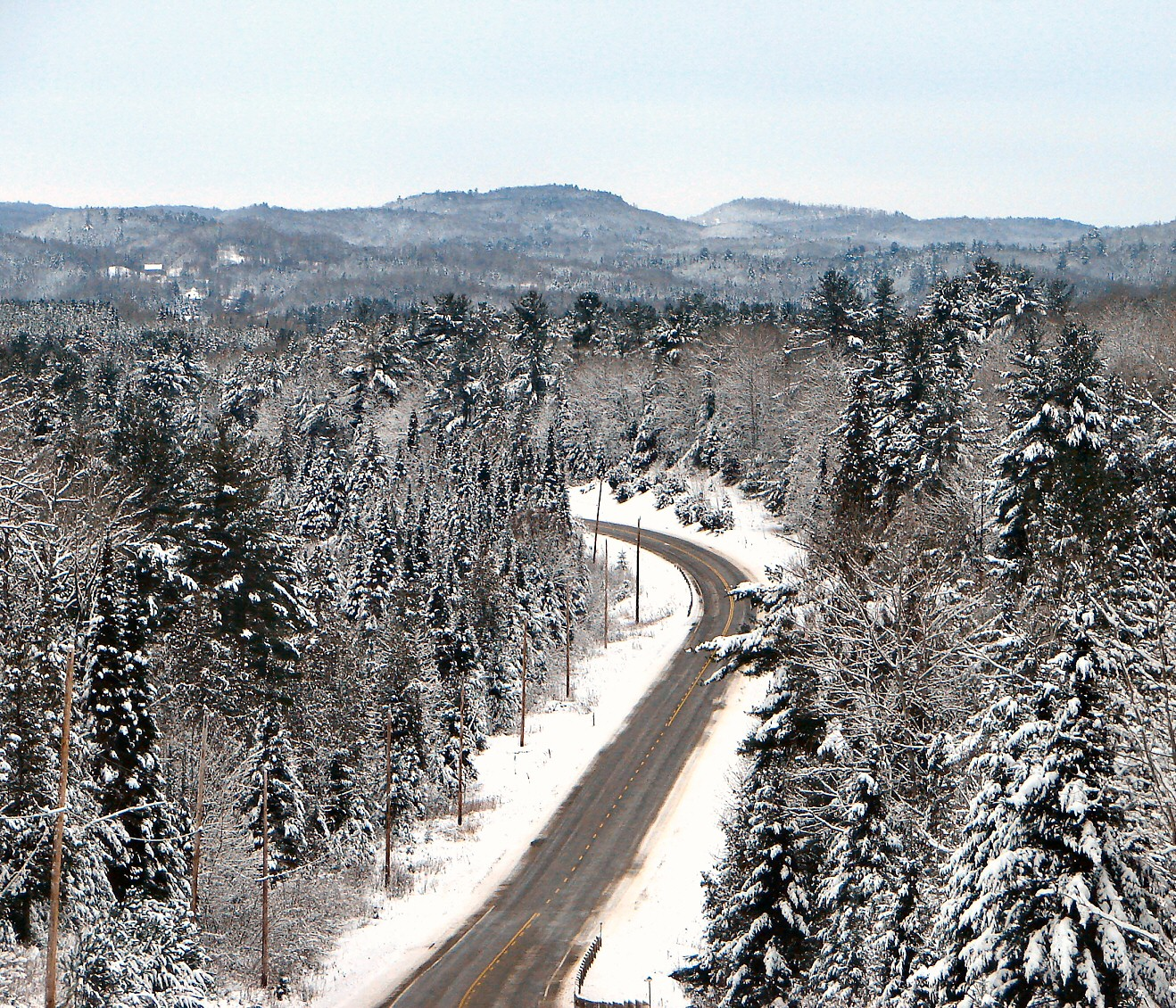
Highway 28 east of McArthur Mills

During the mid-1930s, Highway 28 was extended as far north as Apsley. This was accomplished by assuming existing Peterborough County roads along the Otonabee River as far as Burleigh Falls, via Lakefield. North of there, the department assumed the Burleigh Falls Road. Highway 28 was extended from Peterborough to Burleigh Falls on April 4, 1934. The Burleigh Falls Road was assumed to Apsley on August 11, 1937.

During the 1936 fiscal year, preparations were made for the upcoming merger of the Department of Northern Development and Department of Highway, which occurred on April 1, 1937. The town of Bancroft was chosen as the location of the first operations centre for the new Central District of the department. Consequently, it was decided to extend Highway 28 to the town along the remainder of the Burleigh Falls Road.

Plans to connect Ottawa with Bancroft arose in the mid-1950s. When the province designated Highway 132 in January 1956, they also announced plans for a new highway which would travel south from Renfrew to Calabogie, then turn west towards Denbigh and Bancroft. Ultimately, this road was never constructed, but new road links were established in the following years regardless. In early 1956, Highway 500 was established between Kinmount and Hermon following the Monck Road. In 1963, a new road was constructed between McArthur Mills and Denbigh through the Madawaska Highlands, and opened as an extension of Highway 500 on July 1. During the early 1980s, Highway 500 was renumbered as an extension of Highway 28. This took place between 1980 and 1982.

During the 1997 and 1998 mass downloading of highways, the southern 63 kilometres (39 mi) of Highway 28 were transferred to the counties of Peterborough and Northumberland, the town of Port Hope and Lakefield and the city of Peterborough. The section from Highway 115 north to Lakefield was decommissioned on April 1, 1997. On January 1, 1998, the southernmost section, between Highway 2 and Highway 115, was transferred. During the spring of 2003, the entirety of Highway 134 was redesignated as part of Highway 28, extending the southern terminus to Highway 7 east of Peterborough.

=== Highway 134 ===
Highway 134
- Location: Peterborough County
- Length: 15.3 km (9.5 mi)
- Existed: 1975–2003

Highway 134 served as an alternate route to Highway 28 in Peterborough County. It was established in 1975, when a 15-kilometre (9 mi) section of Peterborough County Road 34 between Highway 7 and Highway 28 was upgraded, creating an eastern bypass around the City of Peterborough. In 1997, Highway 28 south of Lakefield was downloaded, ending abruptly at the Highway 134 / County Road 6 / County Road 29 intersection. This was rectified in 2003 when Highway 134 became part of Highway 28.

== Major intersections ==
The following table lists the major junctions along Highway 28, as noted by the Ministry of Transportation of Ontario.

Division	Location	km	mi	Destinations	Notes
Northumberland	Port Hope	−65.6	−40.8	County Road 2 (Walton Street / Mill Street)	Formerly Highway 2; former Highway 28 southern terminus
Northumberland	Port Hope	−63.4	−39.4	Highway 401 – Toronto, Kingston	Highway 401 exit 464
Peterborough	Cavan-Monaghan	−33.5	−20.8	Highway 7 / TCH – Lindsay Highway 115 south – Toronto	Formerly Highway 7A north; former southern end of Highway 115 concurrency; present-day western end of Highway 7 / Highway 115 concurrency; Highway 115 exit 45
See Ontario Highway 115 § Exit list (exits 45-51)
Peterborough		−27.1	−16.8	The Parkway, Sir Sandford Fleming Drive Highway 7 east / Highway 115 / TCH – Ottawa	Formerly Highway 7 west; Highway 115 exit 51
Peterborough		−22.6	−14.0	Monaghan Road	Formerly Highway 7B east; former northern end of Highway 115 concurrency; former southern end of Highway 7B concurrency; former Highway 115 northern terminus
Peterborough		−18.0	−11.2	Chemong Road	Formerly Highway 7B west; former northern end of Highway 7B concurrency
Peterborough		−11.1	−6.9	County Road 29 begins	Peterborough city limits; Peterborough County Road 29 southern terminus
Peterborough	Selwyn	−7.9	−4.9	County Road 23 north (Buckhorn Road)	Formerly Highway 507 north
Peterborough	Douro-Dummer	0.0 15.3	0.0 9.5	Highway 28 – Bancroft, Peterborough County Road 29 ends County Road 6 east	Formerly Highway 134 south; Highway 28 continued north
Peterborough	Otonabee-South Monaghan	0.0	0.0	Highway 7 / TCH – Peterborough, Ottawa County Road 34 south (Heritage Line)	Highway 28 southern terminus; formerly Highway 134 southern terminus
Peterborough	Douro-Dummer	6.1	3.8	County Road 8	Five Corners
Peterborough	Douro-Dummer	6.4	4.0	County Road 4 – Warsaw	Five Corners
Peterborough	Selwyn / Douro-Dummer boundary	12.3	7.6	County Road 33 east – Lakefield	
Peterborough	Douro-Dummer	15.3	9.5	County Road 29 (Queen Street) – Lakefield County Road 6 east	Formerly Highway 28 south; formerly Highway 134 northern terminus
Peterborough	Selwyn	21.1	13.1	County Road 25 south (Young's Point Road) – Douro	Young's Point
Peterborough	Trent Lakes	31.0	19.3	County Road 36 west – Buckhorn, Bobcaygeon	Burleigh Falls
Peterborough	North Kawartha	38.3	23.8	County Road 56 south (Northey's Bay Road)	Woodview
Peterborough	North Kawartha	57.9	36.0	County Road 504 east (Burleigh Street) – Apsley, Lasswade	Formerly Highway 504 east
Peterborough	North Kawartha	59.2	36.8	County Road 620 east (Burleigh Street) – Apsley	Formerly Highway 620 east
Haliburton	Highlands East	77.7	48.3	County Road 48 north (Dyno Mines Road) – Cheddar	Dyno Estates
Haliburton	Highlands East	82.2	51.1	County Road 9 north (McGillivray Road) – Cardiff	
Hastings	Faraday	89.5	55.6	Highway 118 west – Haliburton, Bracebridge	Paudash
Hastings	Bancroft	99.6	61.9		Beginning of Connecting Link agreement
Hastings	Bancroft	102.2	63.5	Highway 62 south (Mill Street) – Madoc	Directional signage changes from north-south to east-west; western end of Highway 62 concurrency
Hastings	Bancroft	102.4	63.6	Highway 62 north (Hastings Road) – Maynooth	Eastern end of Highway 62 concurrency
Hastings	Bancroft	103.1	64.1		End of Connecting Link agreement
Hastings	Carlow/Mayo	128.3	79.7	Boulter Road – Boulter	McArthur Mills
Renfrew	Brudenell, Lyndoch and Raglan	144.0	89.5	County Road 514 north – Schutt	Formerly Highway 514 north
Lennox and Addington	Addington Highlands	162.6	101.0	Highway 41 – Pembroke, Eganville	Denbigh; Highway 28 eastern terminus
1.000 mi = 1.609 km; 1.000 km = 0.621 mi: Closed/former; Concurrency terminus
