= Juniper Island =

Island on Lower Stony Lake in Ontario, Canada

Coordinates: 44.5455°N 78.1533°W

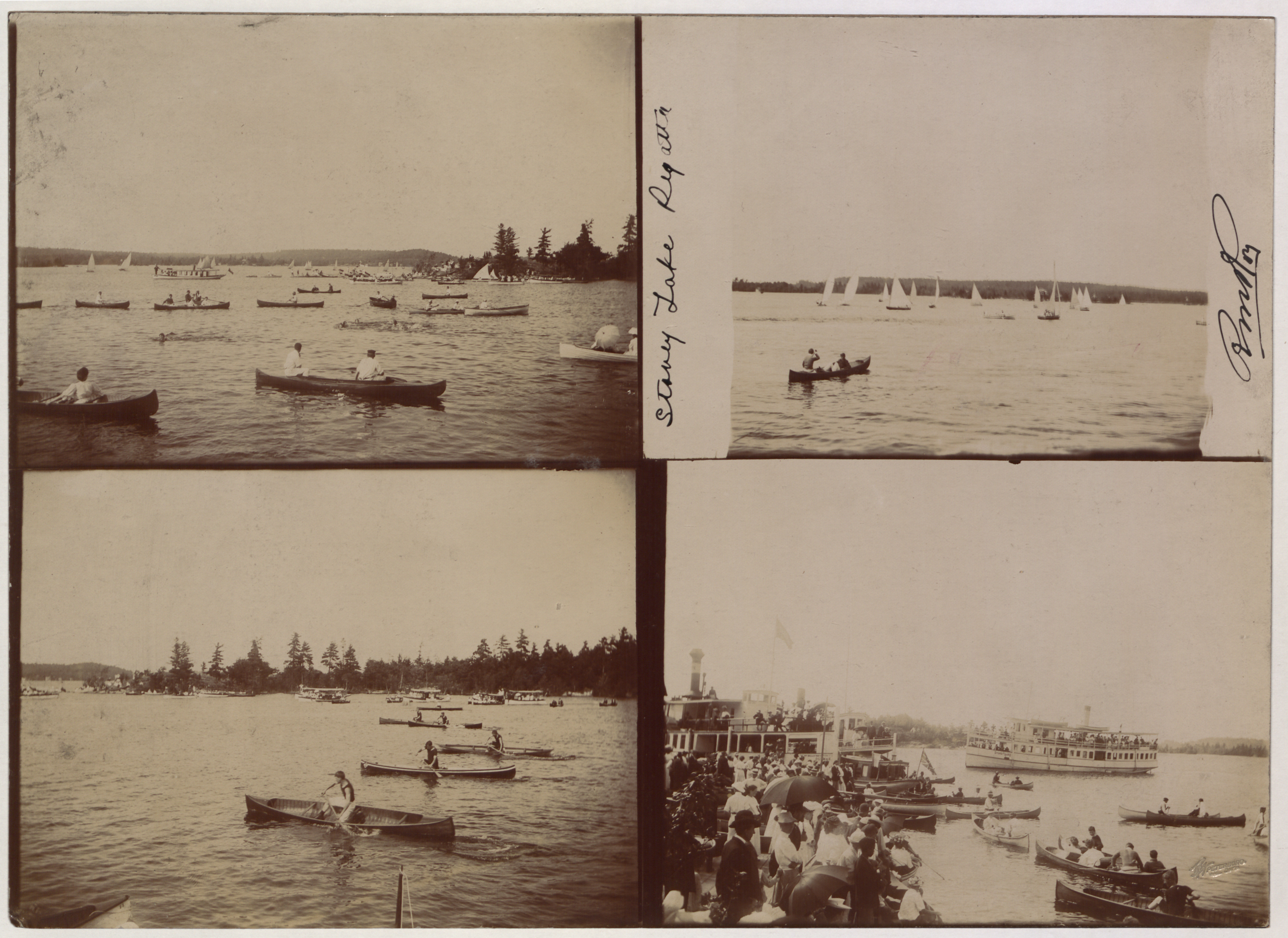
Juniper Island hosts an annual regatta

Juniper Island is one of the largest islands located on Lower Stony Lake, a lake situated in Ontario. It is home to private cottages, the Stony Lake Yacht Club and Juniper Island Store. The Stony Lake Yacht Club is governed by its Board of Directors. Its functions include tennis lessons, sailing lessons as well as several social events. The Stoney Lake Cottagers Association governs the Juniper Island Store, swimming lessons and canoeing lessons as well as weekly square dances.

== History ==
After the American Canoe Association Meet of 1883 was held on Juniper Island, many people from Ontario and the bordering U.S. states bought Crown land and built cottages. These were generally simple, one storey frame structures whose amenities were virtually non-existent. To fill a need, people at Young’s Point, Kawartha Park, McCrackens Landing, Mount Julian and others around the lake, found new sources of income by helping cottagers in many ways: ice cutting, building, guiding, boat repairs and domestic chores.

In 1862, T. W. Robinson constructed the two storey post office and living quarters to supply camping supplies to the island. This business was rather successful. This post office was officially established on the 1st of July in 1891 on Juniper Island in Douro-Dummer, Ontario with T. W. Robinson listed as the postmaster. In 2000 the post office was closed and from 2016 to 2017 the post office building was reconstructed while the living quarters were scrapped. Today, this project is used as a small take-out restaurant run by young adults and older teens.
