= Ontario Highway 115 =

Ontario provincial highway

Highway 115
- Highway 115 highlighted in red

Route information
- Maintained by Ministry of Transportation of Ontario
- Length: 57.6 km (35.8 mi)
- Existed: March 17, 1955–present

Major junctions
- South end: Highway 401 near Newcastle
- Highway 407 in Clarington; Highway 35 near Pontypool; Highway 7A near Cavan
- North end: Highway 7 in Peterborough

Location
- Country: Canada
- Province: Ontario

Highway system
- Ontario provincial highways; Current; Former; 400-series
← Highway 112	→ Highway 118
Former provincial highways
← Highway 114	Highway 116 →

King's Highway 115, commonly referred to as Highway 115, is a provincially maintained highway in the Canadian province of Ontario that connects Peterborough with Toronto via Highway 401. The highway begins at a junction with Highway 401 southwest of Newcastle and ends at an at-grade intersection with Highway 7 east of Peterborough.

Highway 115 is part of the Algonquin Trail and is concurrent with Highway 35 from its southern terminus in Clarington to Enterprise Hill, where it veers towards Peterborough and Highway 35 continues north into the Kawarthas. It is also part of the Trans-Canada Highway from the interchange with Highway 7 south of Springville, Ontario to the northern terminus of the highway. Highway 115 is a freeway northeast of Enterprise Hill and a right-in/right-out (RIRO) expressway south of it, featuring short ramps with abrupt right turns to and from the highway. By January 2010, exit numbers were added to the freeway section north of the Highway 35 concurrency.

The speed limit is 110 km/h (68 mph) throughout the majority of its length, with the exceptions being north of the Parkway Interchange in Peterborough, where the speed limit is 100 km/h (62 mph), and the section running concurrent with Highway 35, where the speed limit is 90 km/h (56 mph). The route is patrolled by the Ontario Provincial Police (OPP) and maintained by the Ministry of Transportation of Ontario (MTO).

== Route description ==
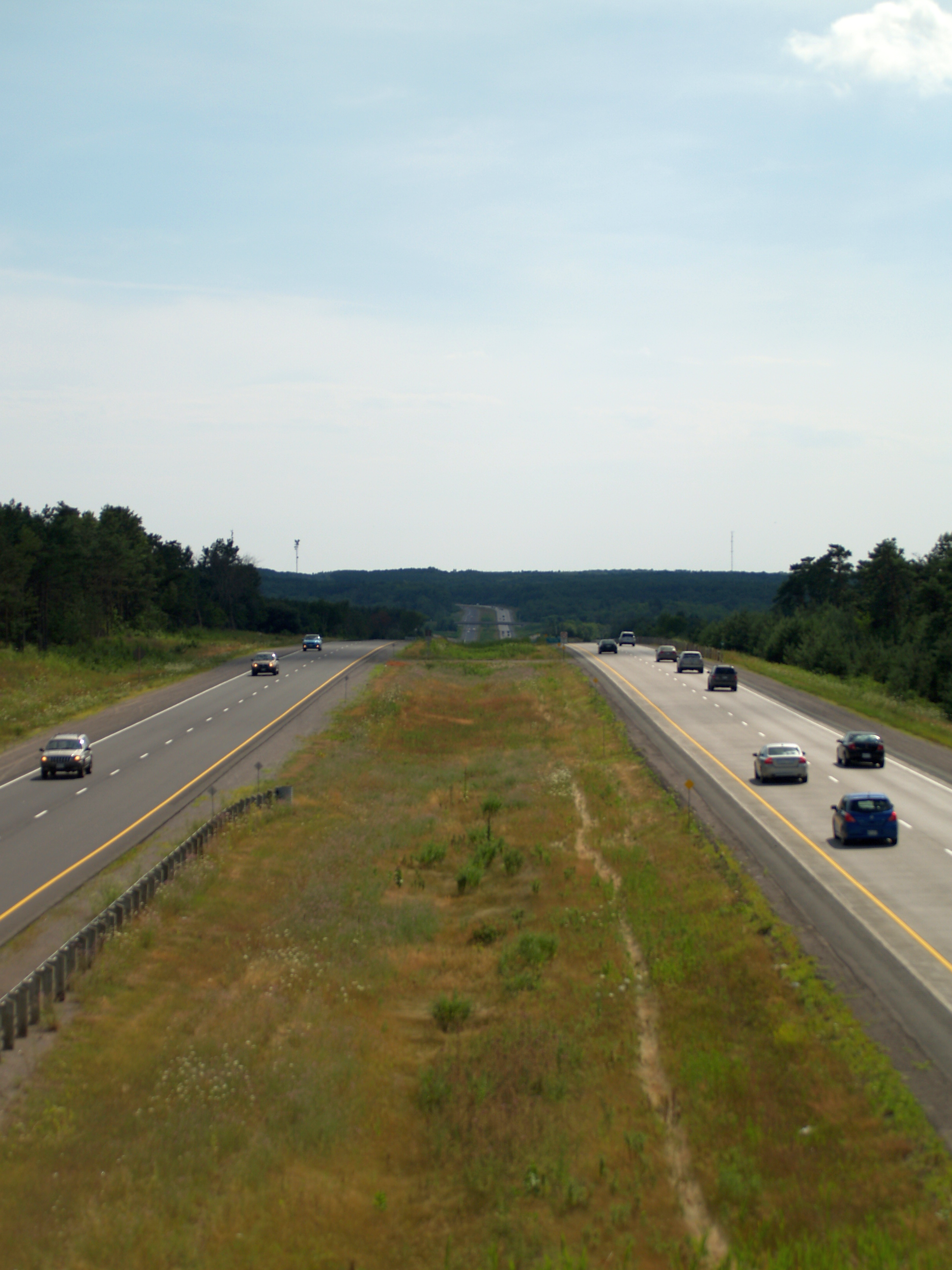
Facing southwest along Highway 115; in the distance, the median narrows and the route merges with Highway 35.

Highway 115 begins at a trumpet interchange with Highway 401, and is concurrent with Highway 35 for 18.9 kilometres (11.7 mi) to Enterprise Hill. For the length of this concurrency, it is a divided four lane RIRO expressway. Here, Highway 35/115 meets the eastern terminus of Highway 407 at a modified trumpet interchange in Clarington, and at Enterprise Hill, the expressway curves eastward and Highway 35 exits at the 35/115 split, continuing north towards Lindsay and the Kawartha Lakes. Highway 115 continues northeast, and its two carriageways diverge, making it a freeway. A depressed grass median, generally 10 metres (33 ft) wide, separates the opposing directions of travel between this point and Peterborough.

Most of the remainder of the highway is straight and surrounded by agricultural lands and forests, until it meets Highway 7. From this point northeastward, Highway 115 is part of the southern Ontario route of the Trans-Canada Highway and concurrent with Highway 7. The freeway continues along the southern edge of Peterborough and ends at Lansdowne Street to the east of the city. Highway 7 continues east towards Ottawa.

== History ==
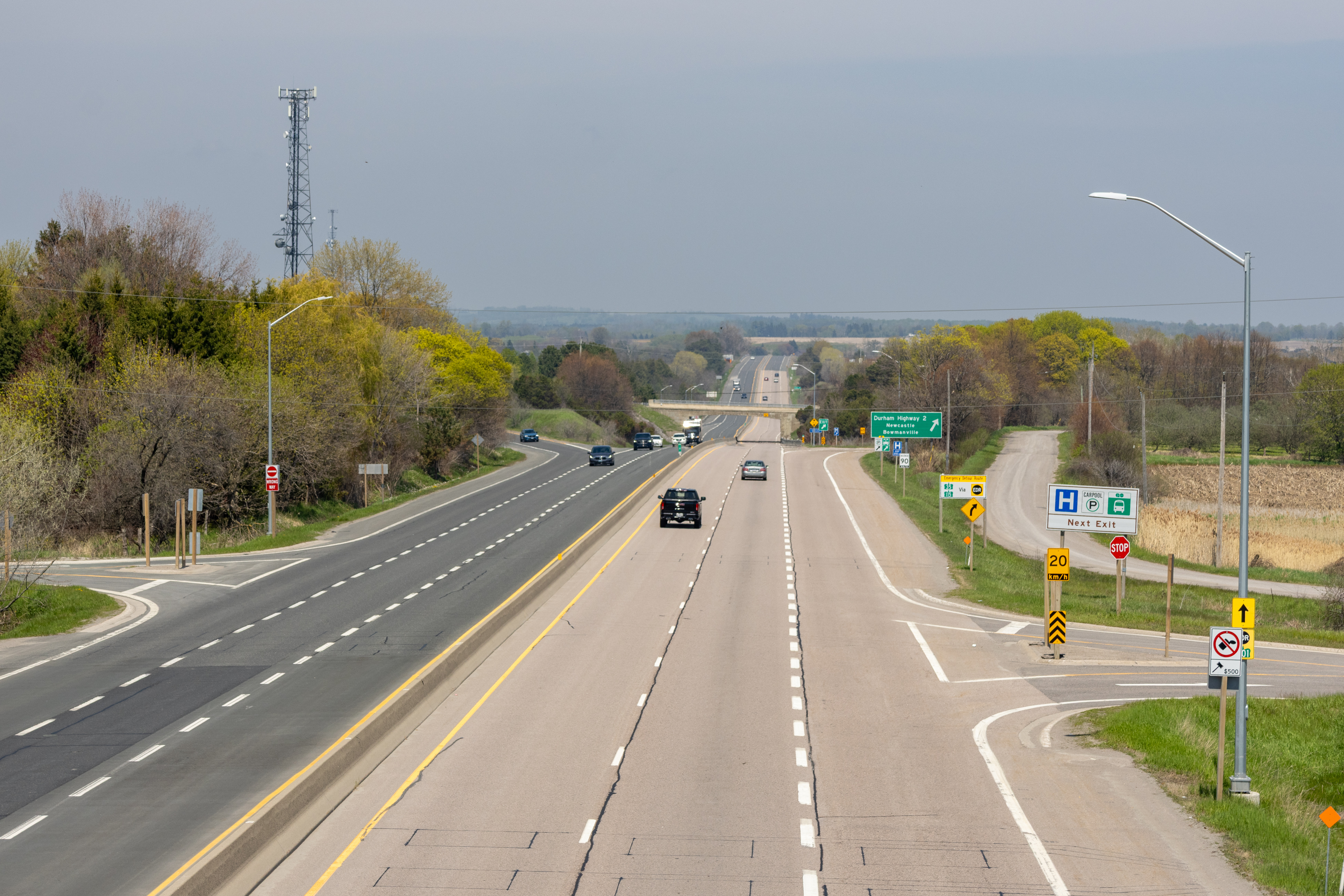
Highway 115/35, looking north from Lovekin Road bridge in Newcastle.

Highway 115 was a new highway constructed in the mid-1950s and gradually improved over the following 40 years. Initially, the route was constructed as a two-lane connection from Highway 35 near Pontypool to Highway 28 on the outskirts of Peterborough. Because of that, it was known as the Pontypool–Peterborough Road. It was eventually extended to Highway 7 on the east side of Peterborough and later widened to a four-lane expressway in the late 1980s. Since then, improvements have been proposed to extend Highway 115 east to Highway 28, but none has come to fruition.

In 1953, construction began on a two-lane road northeastward from Highway 35 south of Pontypool, with the purpose of creating a shorter route between Toronto and Peterborough. The Pontypool–Peterborough Road, as it was referred to during construction, was completed and designated as Highway 115 on March 17, 1955, ending at an intersection with Highway 28 which became notoriously dangerous.

In 1961, Highway 115 was extended southward to the 401, becoming concurrent with Highway 35. That same year, the new Peterborough By-pass opened, providing a route for Highway 7 around the south side of the city via Monaghan Parkway. Highway 115 was later extended east to connect with the bypass, and the northern terminus became the intersection of Erskine Avenue and Lansdowne Street (the former Highway 7A). The 6.2-kilometre (3.9 mi) extension was opened at a ribbon-cutting ceremony on August 25, 1978.

The entire length of the highway south of Highway 7 was widened to four lanes in the 1980s and early 1990s. Later, Highway 115 was rerouted to join Highway 7 on the newly-four-laned Peterborough By-pass route. Although Highway 115 currently meets many Ontario freeway design standards northeast of the Highway 35 interchange, there are currently no plans to re-designate this section as a 400-series highway (like Highway 415 or a non-tolled section of Highway 407).

== Exit list ==
The following table lists the major junctions along Highway 115, as noted by the Ministry of Transportation of Ontario.

Division	Location	km	mi	Exit	Destinations	Notes
Durham	Clarington	0.0	0.0		Highway 401 – Toronto, Kingston Highway 35 begins	Highway 35 / Highway 115 southern terminus; southern end of Highway 35 concurrency; Highway 401 exit 436
Durham	Clarington	0.7	0.43		Lovekin Road	
Durham	Clarington	1.3	0.81		Regional Highway 2 – Newcastle, Bowmanville	Formerly Highway 2
Durham	Clarington	4.2	2.6		Regional Road 17 south (Main Street) – Newcastle; Clarke 3rd Concession	
Durham	Clarington	6.2	3.9		Clarke 4th Concession	
Durham	Clarington (Orono)	8.1	5.0		Regional Road 17 north (Main Street)	No northbound entrance; northbound exit via Clarke 5th Concession
Durham	Clarington (Orono)	8.6	5.3		Station Street	No access across Highway 35/115 (right-in/right out)
Durham	Clarington (Orono)	10.2	6.3		Mill Street / Tamblyn Road	Southbound exit and entrance to Mill Street; northbound exit and entrance to Tamblyn Road
Durham	Clarington (Orono)	10.9	6.8		Regional Road 4 west (Taunton Road); Clarke 6th Concession	
Durham	Clarington	13.4	8.3		Regional Road 9 east (Clarke 7th Concession) – Bewdley	
Durham	Clarington	14.3	8.9	14	Highway 407 west – Toronto	Opened on December 9, 2019.
Durham	Clarington	15.4	9.6		Clarke 8th Concession	
Durham	Clarington	17.6	10.9		Skelding Road	Southbound exit and entrance
Durham	Clarington	18.7	11.6		Old Highway 35	Southbound entrance
Durham	Clarington	18.7	11.6		Wilcox Road	Northbound exit and entrance
Durham	Clarington	18.9	11.7	19	Highway 35 north – Lindsay	Northern end of Highway 35 concurrency
Durham – Kawartha Lakes boundary	Clarington – Kawartha Lakes boundary	21.4	13.3	21	Regional Road 20 (Boundary Road)	Cosigned as Durham Regional Road 20 and Kawartha Lakes Road 20
Kawartha Lakes		26.4	16.4	26	Road 32 (Porter Road) – Bethany, Pontypool	
Peterborough	Cavan Monaghan	33.5	20.8	33	Tapley 1/4 Line	
Peterborough	Cavan Monaghan	38.0	23.6	38	County Road 10 – Millbrook, Cavan	
Peterborough	Cavan Monaghan	40.4	25.1	40	Highway 7A west (Cavan 9th Line) – Port Perry	
Peterborough	Cavan Monaghan	45.1	28.0	45	Highway 7 west / TCH – Lindsay, Fowlers Corners; County Road 28 south – Port Hope	Southern end of Highway 7 concurrency; signed as exits 45A (south) and 45B (west); formerly Highway 28 south / Highway 7A east
Peterborough	Cavan Monaghan	49.1	30.5	49	County Road 11 (Airport Road)	To Peterborough Airport
Peterborough		51.5	32.0	51	The Parkway, Sir Sandford Fleming Drive	Formerly Highway 28 north / Highway 7 west
Peterborough		54.5	33.9	54	Bensfort Road	No northeastbound entrance
Peterborough		56.3	35.0	56	Ashburnham Drive	
Peterborough		57.6	35.8		Highway 7 east (Lansdowne Street) / TCH – Ottawa Television Road north	At-grade; Highway 115 northern terminus; northern end of Highway 7 concurrency; formerly Highway 7B west
1.000 mi = 1.609 km; 1.000 km = 0.621 mi: Concurrency terminus; Incomplete access

== Service Areas ==
Highway 115 has a few unofficial service areas providing food and fuel for motorists without have to travel off the highway. These target vehicles heading north to Peterborough and south to Highway 401. All have entrances and exits back onto highway.

- Esso and Mobil service stations - located next to one another on the southbound side and just north of Noone's. Esso has Country Style donuts within On the Run; Mobil (with Convenience Store) built on site of former Coffee Time location
- Noone's Petro Canada & Orono Petro Pass - on southbound side near Concession Road 8 and also has Tim Hortons (with rest rooms) and convenience store
- Black Dog Cafe Restaurant and Lounge - northbound at Concession Road 6 with Esso service station (rest rooms for restaurant patrons)
- Esso / Petro Canada stations - southbound and northbound respectively at Concession Road 3. Esso has Country Style donuts and Petro Canada located across from Popeye's Chicken (formerly Country Style Donuts store and has restrooms)
