= Ontario Highway 109 =

Former Ontario provincial highway

Highway 109

Route information
- Maintained by Ministry of Transportation of Ontario

Location
- Country: Canada
- Province: Ontario

Highway system
- Ontario provincial highways; Current; Former; 400-series
← Highway 108	→ Highway 112
Former provincial highways
Highway 110 →

King's Highway 109, or Highway 109, is the designation of two distinct former provincial highways in Ontario that existed during the 1950s and 1960s. The first of the two highway ran along Eglinton Avenue in Scarborough from 1953 to 1954 while the other existed from 1958 to 1964 in Highlands East and Faraday until it was absorbed by Highway 121.

== Scarborough ==
Highway 109
- Location: Scarborough
- Existed: 1953–1954

Highway 109 in Scarborough

Highway 109 in Scarborough existed from 1953 to 1954. The highway ran along Eglinton Avenue from Victoria Park Avenue to Kingston Road, which was Highway 2 during the existence of Highway 109, near Scarborough Golf Club Road.

== Highlands East and Faraday ==
Highway 109
- Location: Highlands East and Faraday
- Existed: 1958–1962

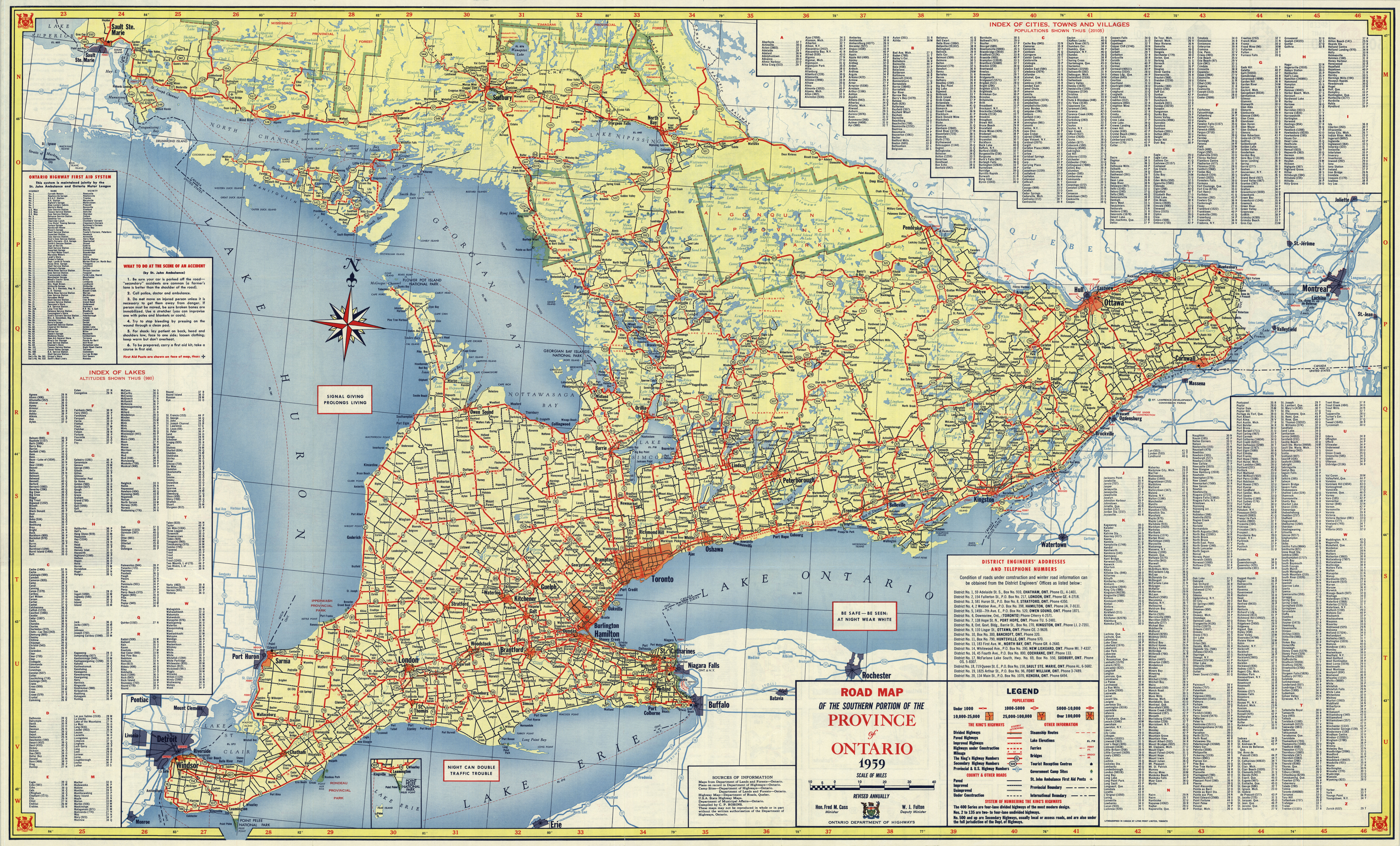
Highway 109 in Highlands East and Faraday

Highway 109 in Highlands East and Faraday ran from Highway 28 in Paudash to former Ontario Highway 500 east of Tory Hill. The highway existed from 1958 until it was decommissioned in 1964 when Highway 121 was extended to absorb its entire length.
