= Fire services in Peterborough County =

Fire services in Peterborough County, Ontario, Canada, are provided by each municipality.

== Operations ==
=== Peterborough ===
Peterborough Fire Department consists of four fire halls, three around the city and one non-staffed at Peterborough Airport, operated by 99 personnel. The fire halls feature three pumpers, one aerial, six multi-purpose small vehicles, two flat-bottomed boats, one airport crash tender, and a 1927 historical fire vehicle.

=== Asphodel-Norwood ===
Asphodel-Norwood Fire Department consists of two fire halls operated by 33 volunteer personnel. Station one at 27 Alma Street in Norwood features one pumper, one tanker and one rescue vehicle. It is also the location of the administrative and training offices of the fire services of the region. Station two is located in Westwood and features one pumper, one tanker and one rescue vehicle.

=== Douro-Dummer ===
Douro-Dummer Fire Department consists of four fire halls operated by 60 personnel. Station one, staffed by 15 personnel, features one tanker, one pumper and one medical vehicle. Station two, in Douro, is staffed by 15 personnel with two pumpers. Station four in Warsaw is staffed by 15 personnel and features one pumper, one tanker, one special rescue unit (SRU), one medical vehicle, and an amphibious vehicle. Station five, in North Dummer, is staffed by 15 personnel and features one pumper, one rescue and one medical vehicle. The stations share two rescue boats. The stations are as follows:

- Station 1 - 812 Daleview Road
- Station 2 - 435 Fourth Line
- Station 4 - 910 Water Street
- Station 5 - 2153 Sixth Line
