= Ontario Highway 504 =

Former Ontario provincial highway

Highway 504

Route information
- Maintained by the Ministry of Transportation of Ontario
- Length: 26.1 km (16.2 mi)
- Existed: 1956–January 1, 1998

Major junctions
- South end: Highway 28 – Apsley
- North end: Highway 620 – Glen Alda

Location
- Country: Canada
- Province: Ontario

Highway system
- Ontario provincial highways; Current; Former; 400-series
← Highway 503	→ Highway 505

Secondary Highway 504, commonly referred to as Highway 504, was a provincially maintained secondary highway in the Canadian province of Ontario. The highway was 26.1 kilometres (16.2 mi) long, connecting Highway 28 south of Apsley with Highway 620 in Glen Alda. The only other community served by Highway 504 was Lasswade.

Highway 504 was established, along with many other secondary highways, in 1956. Originally, the route looped around Chandos Lake back to Apsley. However, the northern portion of this loop would later become Highway 620. During the 1997-1998 mass downloading of Ontario provincial highways to local authorities, Highway 504 was downloaded to Peterborough County and has since been known as County Road 504.

== Route description ==
Although Highway 504 no longer exists today, the route it follows is currently designated as Peterborough County Road 504. Despite this designation, a short 200 metres (660 ft) section near Glen Alda lies within Hastings County. The route began at Highway 28 just south of Apsley, and entered the village along Burleigh Street before turning onto Wellington Street. From there, Highway 504 travelled east into the southern fringes of the Canadian Shield, with thick forests surrounding the majority of the route. However, in addition to the hamlet of Lasswade, located around the midpoint of the highway, the route also served cottagers along the southern and eastern shores of Chandos Lake and numerous residences line the length of road. At Lasswade, located at a junction with Peterborough County Road 46, Highway 504 turned north, and meandered towards Glen Alda. There it encountered Highway 620 and ended.

== History ==
The route of Highway 504 was first assumed by the Department of Highways in early 1956, along with several dozen other secondary highways. It was likely maintained as a development road prior to that. The route travelled in a loop around Chandos Lake, beginning and ending in Apsley. The following year, Highway 620 was designated east from Glen Alda to connect to Highway 62. Highway 620 assumed the northern route of Highway 504, west of Glen Alda, circa 1963. Between then and the 1990s, the route remained unchanged. On January 1, 1998, the entirety of Highway 504, including the section that had become Highway 620, was transferred to the responsibility of Peterborough County.

== Major intersections ==
The following table lists the major junctions along Highway 504, as noted by the Ontario Department of Highways.

Division	Location	km	mi	Destinations	Notes
Peterborough	Apsley	0.0	0.0	Highway 28 – Peterborough, Bancroft	
Peterborough	Apsley	0.5	0.31	County Road 620A (Burleigh Street)	Formerly Highway 620A; former Highway 504 turns onto Wellington Street
Peterborough	Lasswade	12.9	8.0	County Road 46 south – Havelock	Highway turns north at junction
Hastings	Glen Alda	26.1	16.2	County Road 620 west / Township Road 620 east – Coe Hill	Formerly Highway 620
1.000 mi = 1.609 km; 1.000 km = 0.621 mi
