= Ontario Highway 7B =

Former Ontario provincial highway

Highway 7B

Route information
- Auxiliary route of Highway 7
- Maintained by Ministry of Transportation of Ontario

Location
- Country: Canada
- Province: Ontario

Highway system
- Ontario provincial highways; Current; Former; 400-series
← Highway 7A	→ Highway 8

Highway 7B is the designation for seven former business routes of Highway 7 in the Canadian province of Ontario. All but one was the original route of Highway 7 (or what became Highway 7) through the town or city that it served, and was subsequently given the 7B designation when a newer bypass route was constructed to reduce traffic pressure on the urban street network.

The following entries are listed in geographic order, from west to east.

== New Hamburg ==
Highway 7B
- Location: New Hamburg–Baden
- Length: 7.2 km (4.5 mi)
- Existed: 1957–1970

Highway 7B through New Hamburg and Baden was created in 1957 when Highway 7 and Highway 8 were realigned to a new bypass, with Highway 7B assuming the former alignment; the route ran concurrently with Highway 8B for its entire length. The province transferred the route to the Waterloo County in 1970 and is now known as Waterloo Regional Road 1.

== Kitchener ==
Highway 7B
- Location: Baden–Kitchener
- Length: 19.1 km (11.9 mi)
- Existed: 1973–1975

Highway 7B between Baden and Kitchener was created in 1973 when Highway 7 and Highway 8 were realigned to a new corridor. Highway 7B assuming the former alignment between Baden and Kitchener, running concurrently with Highway 8B for its entire length. It followed Gingerich Road, Snyder's Road, Highland Road, and Queen Street (present-day Waterloo Regional Road 6) before following Courtland Avenue (present-day Waterloo Regional Road 53) and rejoining Highway 7/8. With urban sections already under the jurisdiction of the City of Kitchener, the province transferred the route to the Regional Municipality of Waterloo in 1975.

== Thornhill ==
Highway 7B
- Location: Thornhill
- Length: 2.1 km (1.3 mi)
- Existed: 1963–1985

Highway 7B through Thornhill was created in 1963 when Highway 7 realigned to a new bypass that followed sections of Bathurst Street and Langstaff Road, with Highway 7B assuming the former alignment along Centre Street to Yonge Street, where it was cosigned with Highway 11 until it rejoined Highway 7. In the mid-1970s the Highway 11 concurrency was dropped, while the remaining portion was decommissioned in 1985 and transferred to the Town of Vaughan when a Highway 7 was realigned and a greater portion of Centre Street was bypassed.

== Lindsay ==
Highway 7B
- Location: Lindsay
- Length: 6.4 km (4.0 mi)
- Existed: 1958–2015

Highway 7B through Lindsay was created in 1963 when Highway 7 and Highway 35 were realigned to a new bypass. Highway 7B assumed the former alignment along Kent Street and Lindsay Street, and was cosigned with Highway 35B for almost its entire length with the exception of an 800-metre (0.5 mi) section that was cosigned with Highway 35. In 1997, Highway 7B/35B was decommissioned with portions becoming Victoria County Road 15; however, the Highway 7B/35 concurrency remained until c. 2016 when the Highway 7B signage was removed.

=== Major intersections ===
The following table lists the major junctions along Highway 7B. The entire route was located in Victoria County (present-day Kawartha Lakes).

Location	km	mi	Destinations	Notes
	0.0	0.0	Highway 7 / Highway 35 south / TCH – Peterborough, Toronto	Western terminus; west end of Highway 35 concurrency; Highway 7B followed Kent Street West
Lindsay	0.8	0.50	Highway 35 north – Fenelon Falls	Post-1998 eastern terminus; east end of Highway 35 concurrency; west end of Highway 35B concurrency
Lindsay	2.0	1.2	Road 4 (Angeline Street)	
Lindsay	3.4	2.1	Road 15 (Lindsay Street)	Highway 7B/35B followed Lindsay Street South; formerly Highway 36B north
Lindsay	4.4	2.7	Road 19 (Mary Street)	
	6.4	4.0	Highway 7 / Highway 35 – Peterborough, Toronto	Pre-1998 eastern terminus; east end of Highway 35B concurrency
1.000 mi = 1.609 km; 1.000 km = 0.621 mi: Concurrency terminus

== Peterborough ==
Highway 7B
- Location: Peterborough
- Length: 19.50 km (12.12 mi)
- Existed: 1960–1997

Highway 7B through Peterborough was created in 1960 when Highway 7 was realigned to a new route between Peterborough and Fowlers Corners, with Lindsay Road, Chemong Road, Reid Street, McDonnel Street, Sherbrooke Street, George Street and Water Street re-designated as Highway 7B, rejoining Highway 7 at the intersection of George Street and Lansdowne Street. When the Peterborough Bypass opened in 1961, Highway 7 was relocated to the new route and Highway 7B was extended to link with the east end of Peterborough Bypass. Highway 7B was shifted through various streets in central Peterborough over the years, but in the end bypassed downtown by following Parkhill Road and Monaghan Road (a route followed from 1964–70 and 1974–97). Highway 7B was decommissioned in 1997, with rural sections in Peterborough County becoming Peterborough County Road 1 (Lindsay Road section) and Peterborough County Road 18 (Chemong Road section). The signage within the City of Peterborough has been removed and the route assumed the names of their respective city streets.

=== Major intersections ===
The following table lists the major junctions along Highway 7B.

Division	Location	km	mi	Destinations	Notes
Peterborough	Fowlers Corners	0.00	0.00	Highway 7 / TCH – Lindsay, Ottawa; County Road 26 north (Frank Hill Road)	Western terminus; Highway 7B followed present-day County Road 1 east (Lindsay Road)
Peterborough	Selwyn	3.70	2.30	County Road 12 (Fife's Bay Road)	
Peterborough	Selwyn	7.00	4.35	County Road 18 north (Chemong Road) – Bridgenorth	Highway 7B followed present-day County Road 1 south (Chemong Road)
Peterborough	Selwyn	8.90	5.53	County Road 19 east (3rd Line)	
Peterborough		11.80	7.33	Parkhill Road	Former Highway 28 north; Highway 7B followed Parkhill Road west; west end of Highway 28 concurrency
Peterborough		12.90	8.02	Monaghan Road	Highway 7B/28 followed Monaghan Road South
Peterborough		14.00	8.70	Charlotte Street / Clonsilla Avenue	Former Highway 28 south; east end of Highway 28 concurrency
Peterborough		15.60	9.69	Lansdowne Street	Highway 7B followed Lansdowne Street east
Peterborough		19.50	12.12	Highway 7 / Highway 115 south / TCH – Ottawa, Lindsay, Toronto	Eastern terminus
1.000 mi = 1.609 km; 1.000 km = 0.621 mi: Concurrency terminus

== Madoc ==
Highway 7B
- Location: Madoc
- Length: 5.0 km (3.1 mi)
- Existed: 1967–1969

Highway 7B through Madoc was created in 1967 when Highway 7 was realigned to a new bypass, with Highway 7B assuming the former alignment. The province transferred the route to the Township of Madoc in 1969 and is currently known as Hastings County Road 23.

== Carleton Place ==
Highway 7B
- Location: Carleton Place
- Length: 3.21 km (1.99 mi)
- History: Established August 11, 1948 (unnumbered); Numbered 1953 (as Highway 110); Renumbered December 1959 (as Highway 15B); Renumbered September 8, 1961 (as Highway 7B); Decommissioned 1998

Highway 7B was a 3.21-kilometre (1.99 mi) bypass along the northern edge of Carleton Place that existed between 1961 and 1998. When it was decommissioned on January 1, 1998, and transferred to Lanark County, it followed Townline Road from Highway 7 easterly to Highway 15 (now Lanark County Road 29). The route was originally assumed by the Department of Highways on August 11, 1948. Though it remained unnumbered for several years, it was numbered as Highway 110 in 1953. At that time, Highway 7 was part of Highway 15.

Construction of the Carleton Place Bypass began in the spring of 1958, with the aim of rerouting Highway 15 traffic out of the downtown area. Prior to its completion, Highway 15 entered Carleton Place along High Street, turning south onto Bridge Street, and along Moore Street and Franktown Road to the junction with Highway 29. The bypass was designated as part of Highway 15 on November 19, 1959. It opened several weeks later in early December as an unpaved road. Paving of the bypass took place the following spring. Soon after, Highway 110 was renumbered as part of Highway 15B, following Townline Road east, then Bridge Street, Murray Street and Franktown Road south to the junction of the bypass and Highway 29.

On September 8, 1961. Highway 15 was rerouted between Smiths Falls and Carleton Place to travel concurrently along Highway 29; Highway 7 was extended along the former routing of Highway 15, from Perth to Carleton Place, and signed concurrently with Highway 15 eastward to Ottawa. As a result of these changes, Highway 15B became Highway 7B.

From 1961-1994, Highway 7B followed Town Line Road and then shared a concurrency with Highway 29 (later renumbered to Highway 15 in c. 1974) along Bridge Street, Moore Street, and Franktown Road. When Highway 15 was realigned to an eastern bypass in 1994, Highway 7B was re-routed to continue east on Town Line Road to Highway 15 at McNeely Avenue. In 1998, Highway 7B was decommissioned and the route is now known as Lanark County Road 7B.

=== Major intersections ===
The following table lists the major junctions along Highway 7B. The entire route was located in Lanark County.

Location	km	mi	Destinations	Notes
Mississippi Mills	0.00	0.00	Highway 7 / TCH – Peterborough, Toronto	Present-day County Road 7B
Carleton Place	1.35	0.84		Western town limits
Carleton Place	2.09	1.30	Bridge Street	
Carleton Place	3.21	1.99	County Road 29 (McNeeley Avenue)	Formerly Highway 15
1.000 mi = 1.609 km; 1.000 km = 0.621 mi
