= Coast Guard Station Burlington =

US Coast Guard station in Burlington, Vermont

Location
- Coordinates: 44°28′50″N 73°13′27″W

Site history
- Built: 1948

Coast Guard Station Burlington, Vermont is a United States Coast Guard station established in 1948 as a four-man light attendant station on Juniper Island. Currently the Station is located on the waterfront of Burlington, Vermont, in a facility built in 1993. Some of the missions they conduct are maritime law enforcement, search and rescue, and ice rescue. They currently operate one 29’ RBSII and one 45’ RBM.

Their primary area of responsibility is Lake Champlain and are based out of Burlington.
