= Young Point =

Young Point, or Young's Point, may mean:

== Places ==
- Young Point (Antarctica)
- Young's Point, Ontario, Canada, a village
- Young's Point Provincial Park, Alberta, Canada
- Young's Point, a former name of Buzzard Point, Washington, DC, United States, a peninsula and neighborhood of Washington

== Other uses ==
- Battle of Young's Point, Louisiana, United States, an aborted Confederate attack during the American Civil War

== See also ==
- USCGC Point Young, a former United States Coast Guard cutter named after Point Young, Alaska
