= Warsaw Caves =

Coordinates: 44°27′44″N 78°07′43″W

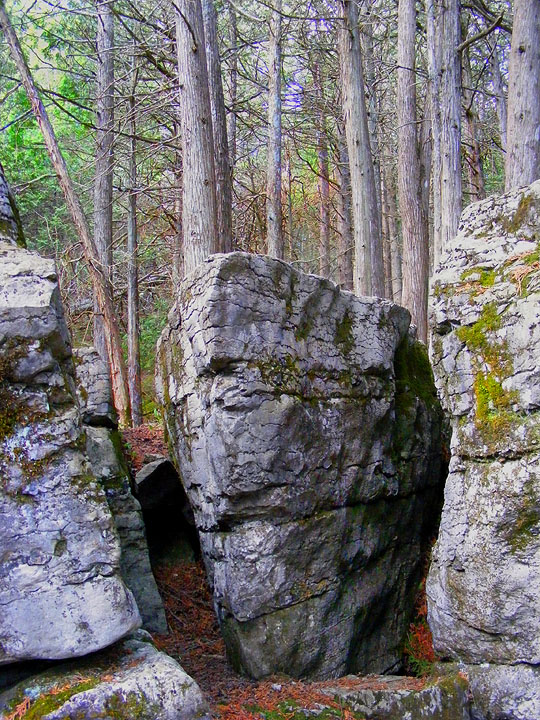
The caves.

The Warsaw Caves are a group of caverns, a geological feature located in the Warsaw Caves Conservation Area near the village of Warsaw, Ontario, Canada. The caves have long passages and mostly small open areas which are accessible to spelunkers.

The caves are cavities in the limestone rock which underlies the whole area. The Indian River, which flows through the area, disappears beneath the ground as it falls into underground channels caused by the collapsed limestone layers around the caves.

The limestone layers are a result of glacial melting at the end of the last ice age, about 12,000 years ago. Fast flowing water has worn passages and kettles in the soft limestone, but once the ice was gone the flow lessened, and the ground gradually rose when relieved of the weight of the ice. Because of this the upper caves are no longer submerged.

The area around the caves has several popular hiking trails, totaling more than 15 km in length. The caves are also a destination on cycling routes through the area.

Many of the smaller caves provide hibernation spots for bats during the winter.

== Warsaw Caves Conservation Area ==
The Warsaw Caves Conservation Area is an Area of Natural and Scientific Interest and is operated by the Otonabee Region Conservation Authority. The initial purchase of property to establish the park was made in 1962 and it was opened to the public in 1964. In addition to the caves, which are the conservation area's most popular attraction, there are 15 km of hiking trails, a 52-site campground, 3 group campsites, a beach and swimming area, and canoeing. Other geological features of interest include a limestone plain and rockmills.
