= Burleigh Falls =

Geological feature and small community in Peterborough County, Ontario, Canada

Coordinates: 44°33′23″N 78°12′11″W

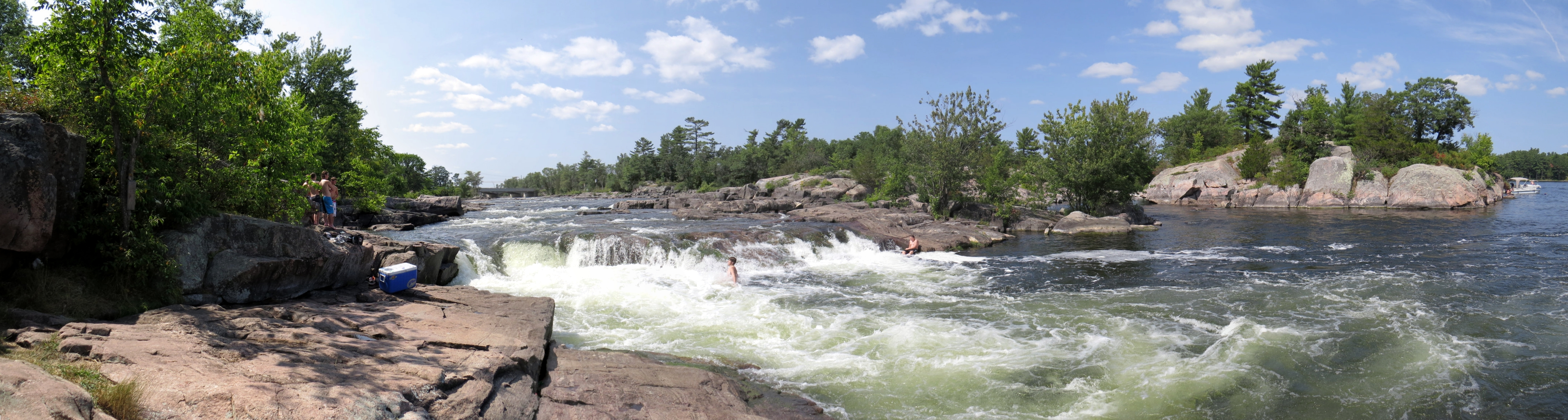
Panorama photo of Burleigh Falls with exposed rock during a time of low flow.

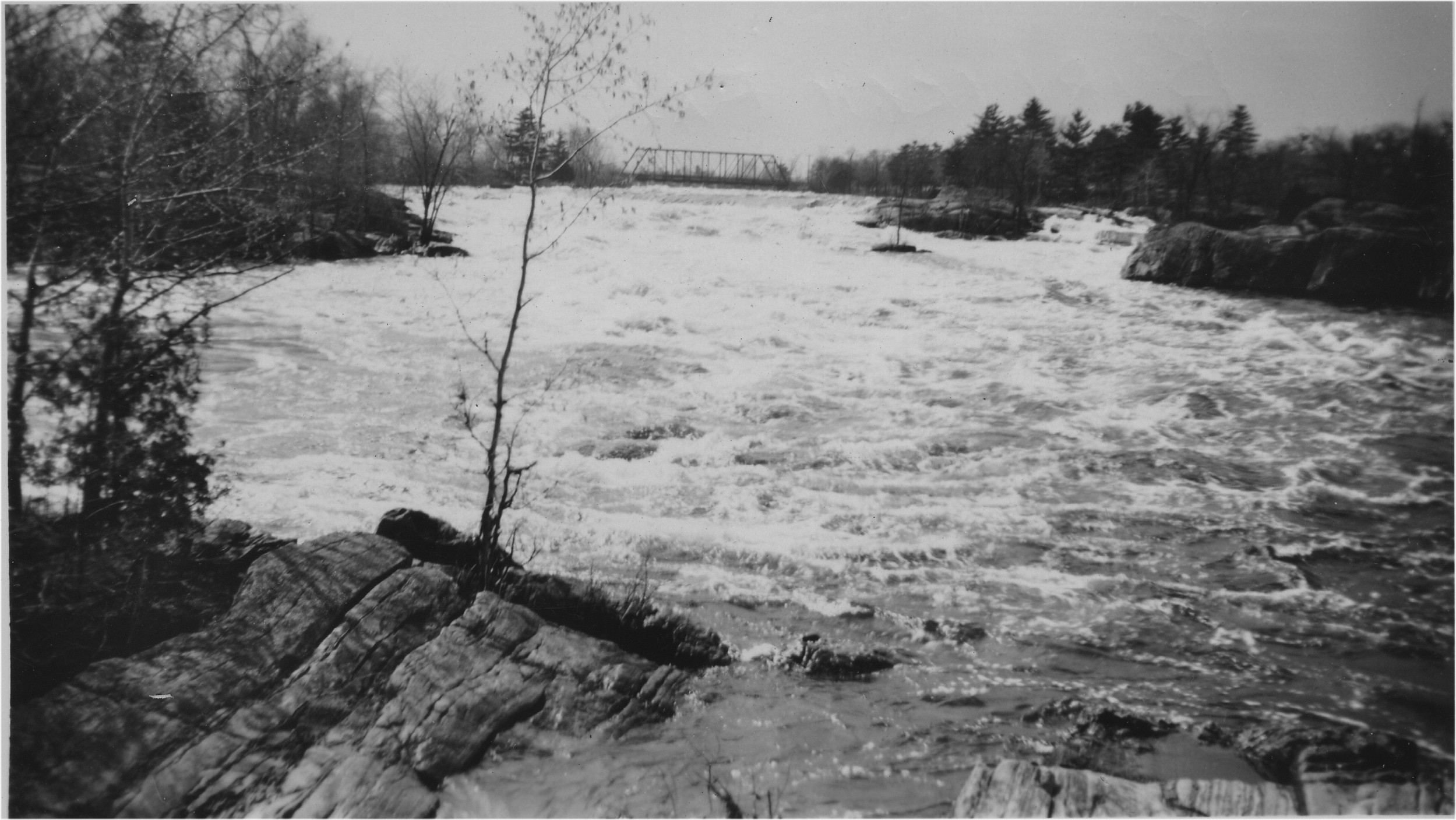
Photo of Burleigh Falls taken early to mid 1920s at a time of high water flow.

Burleigh Falls is both a geological feature and a small community in Peterborough County, Ontario, Canada. The falls form the boundary between the municipality of North Kawartha to the north and the municipality of Selwyn to the south.

The falls (more accurately described as a chute or cascade, since the drop in water level is more horizontal than vertical) are created by a narrowing in the flow of water between Lovesick Lake and Lower Buckhorn Lake on the west and Stoney Lake to the east. At one time the landform was known as the "Burleigh chute".

Around 1910-1926, five Indigenous Mississaugas families who had been evicted from their home reserves under Canada's notorious "enfranchisement" policy settled on Island 31 at Burleigh Falls. Jack Jacobs was the first to build his home and settle permanently on Island 31, where his leadership had inspired other families from the home reserve to follow. In 1912, Jack Jacobs was evicted from his home by the government of Canada to make room for the construction of the dam and Lock 28 of the Trent-Severn Waterway. They settled on the shores of Lovesick Lake and their community became known as the "Burleigh Falls Indians". Today the community is known as Kawartha Nishnawbe and numbers approximately 1,200 members. In 2002 the Ontario Court of Justice ruled that the people of Kawartha Nishnawbe are a distinct Mississauga First Nation community, based at Burleigh Falls, and that they hold constitutionally protected Treaty rights. Inexplicably, the government of Canada still refuses to recognize Kawartha Nishnawbe as an Indigenous community and refuses to provide any services to the community or to engage in consultations with them when approving projects which threaten their Treaty rights, as required by Canadian law. Despite the 2002 decision recognizing their Treaty rights, the Government of Canada today refuses to even acknowledge that the people of Kawartha Nishnawbe hold Treaty rights.

== Burleigh Falls bridge ==
The bridge over the upper part of the cascade is part of Ontario Highway 28, a major north-south transportation route. Although the south and north shores are at one point less than 100m apart, the area is so riddled with large lakes and rivers that before the bridge was built the shortest distance by land between the two points was at that time more than 70 km., much of it without roads. Before 1950s the Kings Post Truss style iron bridge was built in the 1860s, travelers managed by crossing Stony Lake, by boat in the summer, and across the ice in winter. The current T beam bridge was completed in 1953.

== Lock 28 ==
In historical times, because of the large number of lakes and the rocky uneven terrain, most travel in central Ontario took place on water. An extensive system of locks and dams, the Trent-Severn Waterway, which connects Lake Ontario to Georgian Bay, was built to facilitate this travel. At Burleigh Falls, the large, rapidly moving flow, cascading over and around rocks, was a serious barrier to transportation, so Lock 28 was built just to the north, allowing boat traffic to bypass the falls. Commonly known as the Burleigh Falls Lock, it was previously composed of two 4m flights, and the lock canal, about 190m in length blasted through solid granite. The lock was replaced with one lock with a lift of 7.3m The lock was completed in 1887. Limestone around this area was used in the construction of several nearby locks.

== Control dam ==
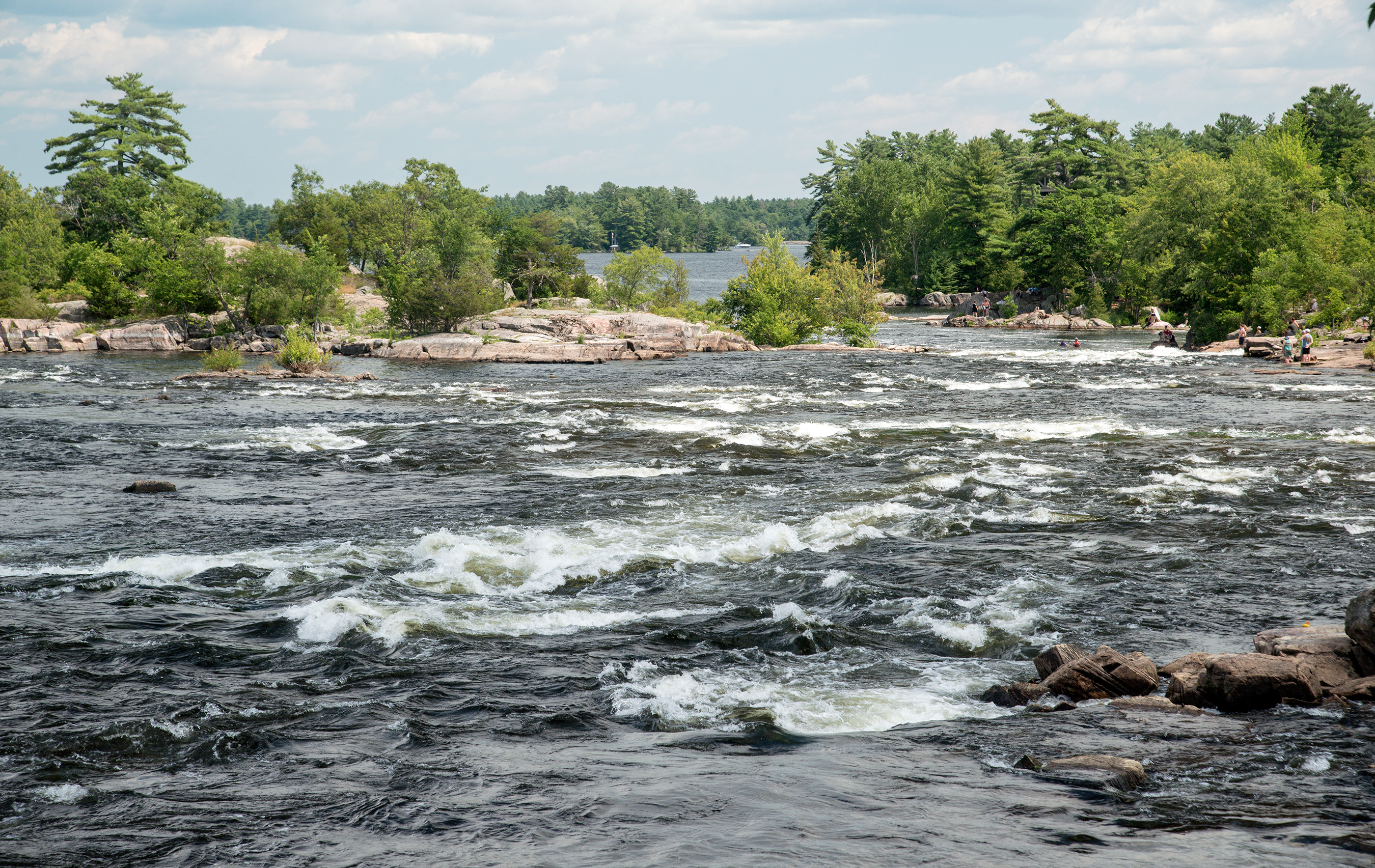
High water level in July 2017

Also as part of the Trent-Severn Waterway, a long control dam was built just above the falls. The purpose of this dam is to regulate the water level on Lovesick Lake, both keeping it navigable for larger boats and ensuring sufficient water to operate the lock.

== Village of Burleigh Falls ==
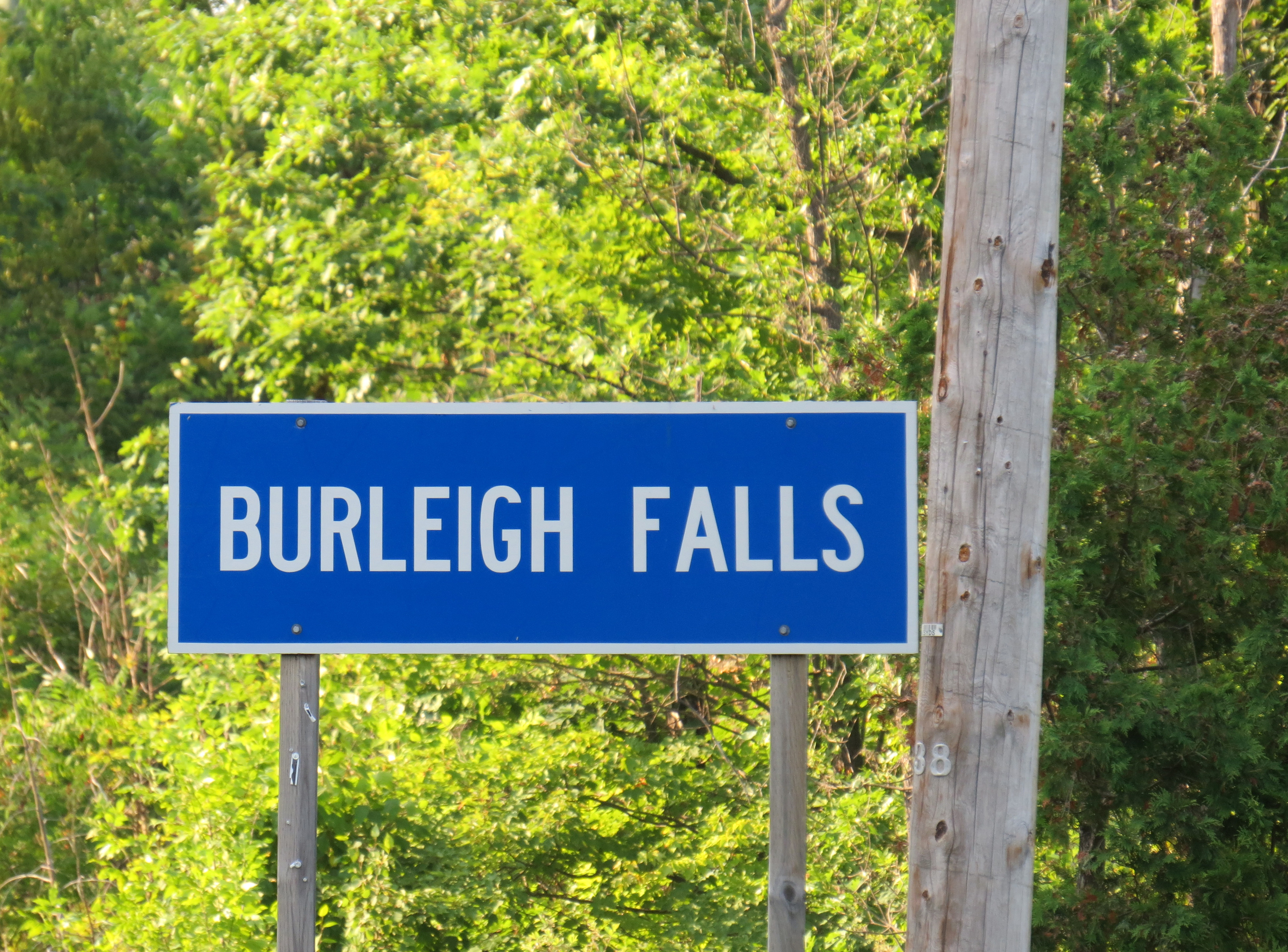

With the building of the bridge and lock, a village, also known as Burleigh Falls, developed on the nearby shores, with businesses which supply amenities to lumberman, steamship passengers, various other travelers by road and water, and in more recent years to tourists and the thousands of cottagers on the two large nearby lakes.

On the 11 acre Burleigh Island, a hotel was built by John Holmes in 1857. The first post office opened in the village in 1877.

At Burleigh Falls there is a public wharf.

== Outdoor activities ==
Recreational boating, particularly canoeing, has long been popular around Burleigh Falls. In 1974 the local Kawartha Non-Status Indian and Metis Association (a non-profit corporation owned by Kawartha Nishnawbe) started the Burleigh Falls Canoe Company, and began manufacturing cedar-strip canoes in response for the demand for these boats. The area has been popular with fishermen since the days of the pioneers. More recently, kayaking enthusiasts have arrived to enjoy the rapids.
