= Stony Lake (Ontario) =

Lake in Peterborough County in central Ontario, Canada

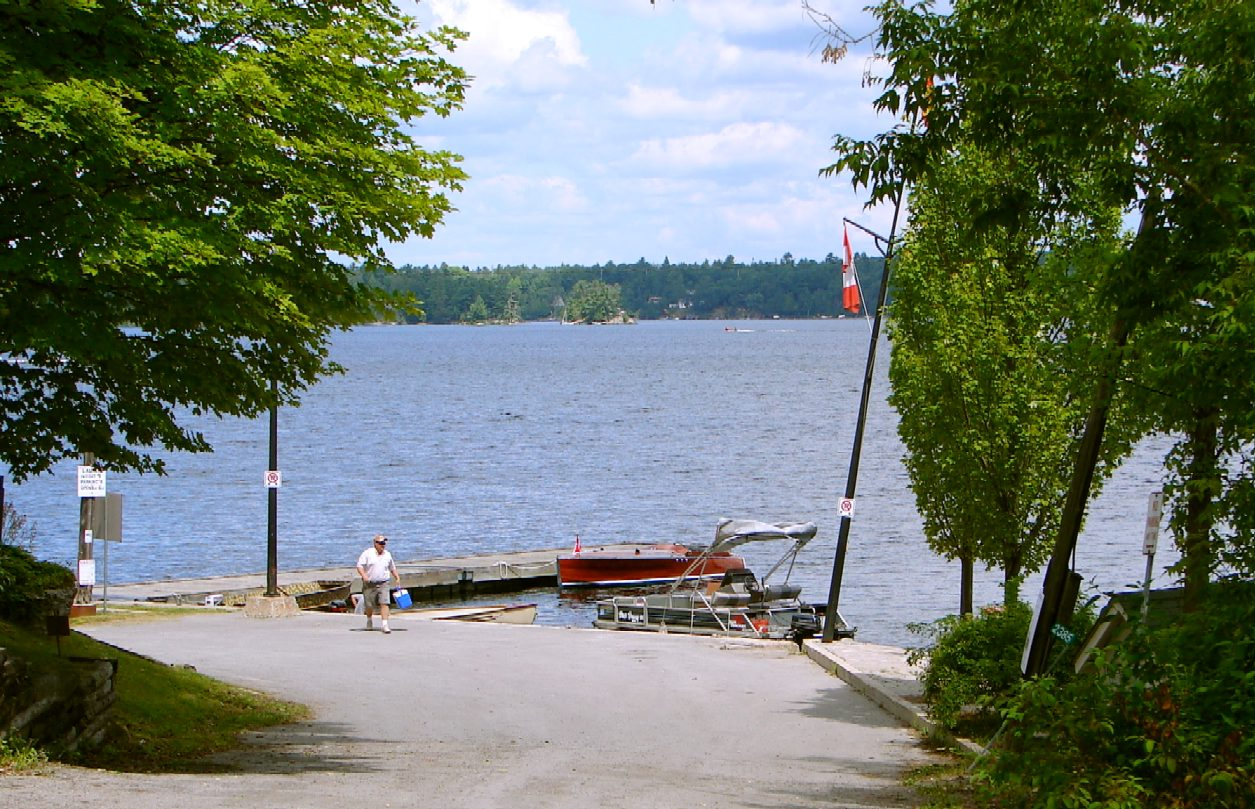
- Crowes Landing on Stony Lake

- Location within Ontario
- Location: Peterborough County, Ontario
- Group: Kawartha Lakes
- Coordinates: 44°33′23″N 78°06′49″W
- Primary inflows: Lovesick Lake
- Primary outflows: Katchewanooka Lake, White/Dummer Lake
- Basin countries: Canada
- Surface area: 28 km^{2} (11 sq mi)
- Max. depth: 105 ft (32 m)
- Residence time: Mostly summer residences
- Surface elevation: 234 m (768 ft)
- Islands: Juniper Island, Horseshoe Island, Big Island, Doe Island, Rankin's Rock
- Settlements: Burleigh Falls, Ontario; Young's Point, Ontario

Stony Lake (also called Stoney Lake) is a lake in Peterborough County in central Ontario, Canada. There are three interconnected lakes (Upper Stony Lake to the northeast, Stony Lake in the centre, and Clear Lake to the southwest) which together are known as Stony (or Stoney) Lake. Stony Lake forms the eastern end of the Kawartha Lakes region and is part of the Trent-Severn Waterway. It is primarily a summer cottage area but there are many permanent residences on the lakes.

== Geography ==
Stony Lake is located in Peterborough County nearly two hours northeast of Toronto. It lies in the townships of Douro-Dummer, North Kawartha and Selwyn. The lake, some 20 miles (32 km) long from Young's Point, Ontario to the lake's eastern shores, about 234 metres (768 ft) above sea level, with a combined surface area of approximately 28 square kilometres (11 sq mi), and encompasses over 1,000 islands. Sportfish caught in the lake include smallmouth and largemouth bass, walleye and muskellunge.

One of its islands, Fairy Lake Island, encloses another small body of water: Fairy Lake. Fairy Lake is surrounded by private property.

== Geology ==
Like most lakes in Ontario, Stony Lake was created during and after the last ice age. The lake straddles the border between the Canadian Shield and the Great Lakes–St. Lawrence Lowlands land forms. The lake is influenced both by the rugged granite of the Canadian Shield to the north, and by the more gentle, heavily forested Great Lakes–St. Lawrence Lowlands to the south.

== History ==
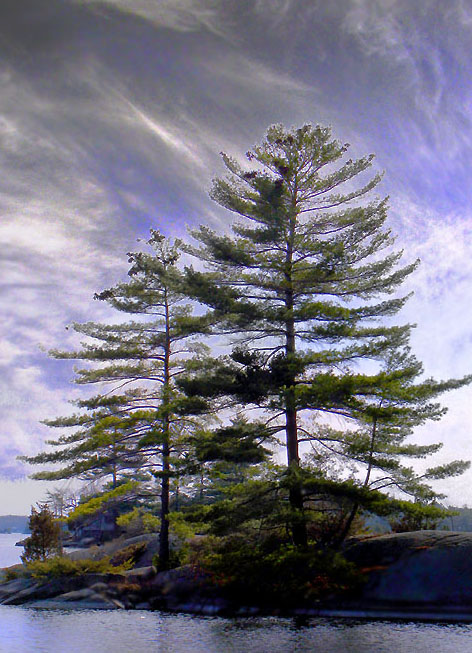
Stony Lake, Ontario

The region has been inhabited for thousands of years. Early First Nations settlement is evidenced by a remarkable collection of prehistoric rock carvings to be seen at the east end of Stony Lake in Petroglyphs Provincial Park. On-going historic research argues that Samuel de Champlain traveled through the area's lakes, rivers and overland portages in the 17th century. The First Nations were joined in the 19th century by European settlers intent on logging and farming. In the mid-19th century logging became a large industry in the Kawarthas and Stoney Lake was used as part of the highway for moving logs to the sawmills downriver. The Trent-Severn canal system was completed early in the 20th century, and became the dominant commercial waterway in the region.

The American Canoe Association met on Juniper Island in 1883, and development evolved naturally from travellers fishing or hunting from simple lodges. Lengthier camping expeditions on the many islands became common. In the late 19th century and early 20th century many people from Ontario and the bordering U.S. states bought Crown land and built cottages. These were generally simple, one-story frame structures with few amenities. As well, those early settlers, at Young's Point, Kawartha Park, McCracken's Landing, Mount Julian and others around the lake, found new sources of income by helping cottagers in many ways: ice cutting, building, guiding, boat repairs and domestic chores.

== Name ==
Stony Lake was known to early European settlers as Salmon Trout Lake. The name now is spelled either as "Stony" or "Stoney" (with or without an e). A history of the lake says, "Arguments are mounted for each possibility and proponents tenaciously defend their stand." It quotes a cottager's association report from the 1970s (noting that the Stony Lake Cottagers' Association was reformed as the Association of Stoney Lake Cottagers):

Some years ago, the Ston(e)y Lake Cottager's Association attempted to determine the official spelling of Ston(e)y Lake. Edwin C. Guillet, then the provincial archivist and author of The Valley of the Trent, argued that the spelling should be with an "e." He went on at length citing numerous historical references for support.... In the forefront of spelling Ston(e)y without an "e" was Leslie M. Frost, former Premier of Ontario. Support for this spelling comes from the Peterborough Examiner and a host of Trent Canal publications.

== In popular culture ==
Ronnie Hawkins owned an estate on the lake until he sold it in late 2017 for $3.98 million. In August, 1980, rock band Rush started work on the album Moving Pictures at the studio on his property.

Some of the 2003 film The In-Laws was shot on Stony Lake. The 2005 film Cheaper by the Dozen 2 was filmed at a cottage near Burleigh Falls.
