= Cavan Monaghan =

- Township (lower-tier)
- Township of Cavan Monaghan
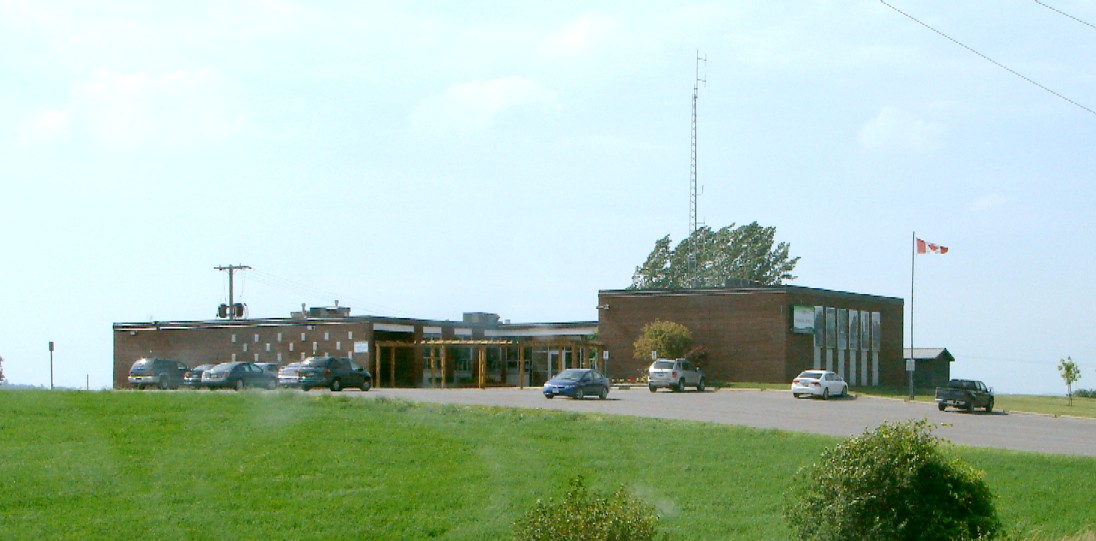
- Municipal office in Cavan

- Location within Peterborough County Location within Southern Ontario
- Coordinates: 44°12′N 78°28′W
- Country: Canada
- Province: Ontario
- County: Peterborough
- Settled: 1817
- Incorporated: January 1, 1998

Government
  - Type: Township
  - Mayor: Matthew Graham
  - Fed. riding: Haliburton—Kawartha Lakes
  - Prov. riding: Haliburton—Kawartha Lakes—Brock

Area
  - Land: 306.39 km^{2} (118.30 sq mi)

Population (2021)
  - Total: 10,016
  - Density: 32.7/km^{2} (85/sq mi)
- Time zone: UTC-5 (EST)
  - Summer (DST): UTC-4 (EDT)
- Postal code: L0A 1G0
- Area codes: 705, 249
- Website: www.cavanmonaghan.net

Cavan Monaghan (known as Cavan-Millbrook-North Monaghan until 2007) is a township in Peterborough County in central-eastern Ontario, Canada, 20 kilometres (12 mi) southwest of the city of Peterborough.

== History ==
The original townships of Cavan and Monaghan were surveyed by John Deyell in 1817, and were named after County Cavan and County Monaghan in Ireland, from which many of its settlers had emigrated. By 1819, there were 244 settlers, and by 1861 the population had risen to 4,901, many of whom were descendants of United Empire Loyalists, veterans of the War of 1812 who had been granted land there, or the original and later settlers from Ireland. After Confederation in 1867, the population began to drop as many families left for Western Canada.

The original Irish settlers were Protestants, and many of them were associated with the Orange Order. In the mid-19th century the "Cavan Blazers" were established as a fiercely Protestant vigilante group, who often burned down the farms of Catholic settlers.

The Township of Cavan and the Village of Millbrook, previously part of Durham County, became part of Peterborough County in 1974, and were amalgamated, along with North Monaghan, into one township, Cavan–Millbrook–North Monaghan, on January 1, 1998. In 2007, the township was renamed Cavan Monaghan, as many thought the older name was too long.

== Communities ==
The township of Cavan Monaghan comprises a number of villages and hamlets, including:

- Carmel
- Cavan
- Cedar Valley
- Five Mile Turn
- Fraserville
- Ida
- Millbrook
- Mount Pleasant
- South Monaghan / Centreville (partially)
- Springville
- Tapley
- Bailieboro (partially)
- Cavan Station
- Dranoel
- Fairmount
- Kendry
- Murray Hill

None are incorporated and a couple are relegated to just names on a map as cars made transportation easier and service areas concentrated in fewer nodes.

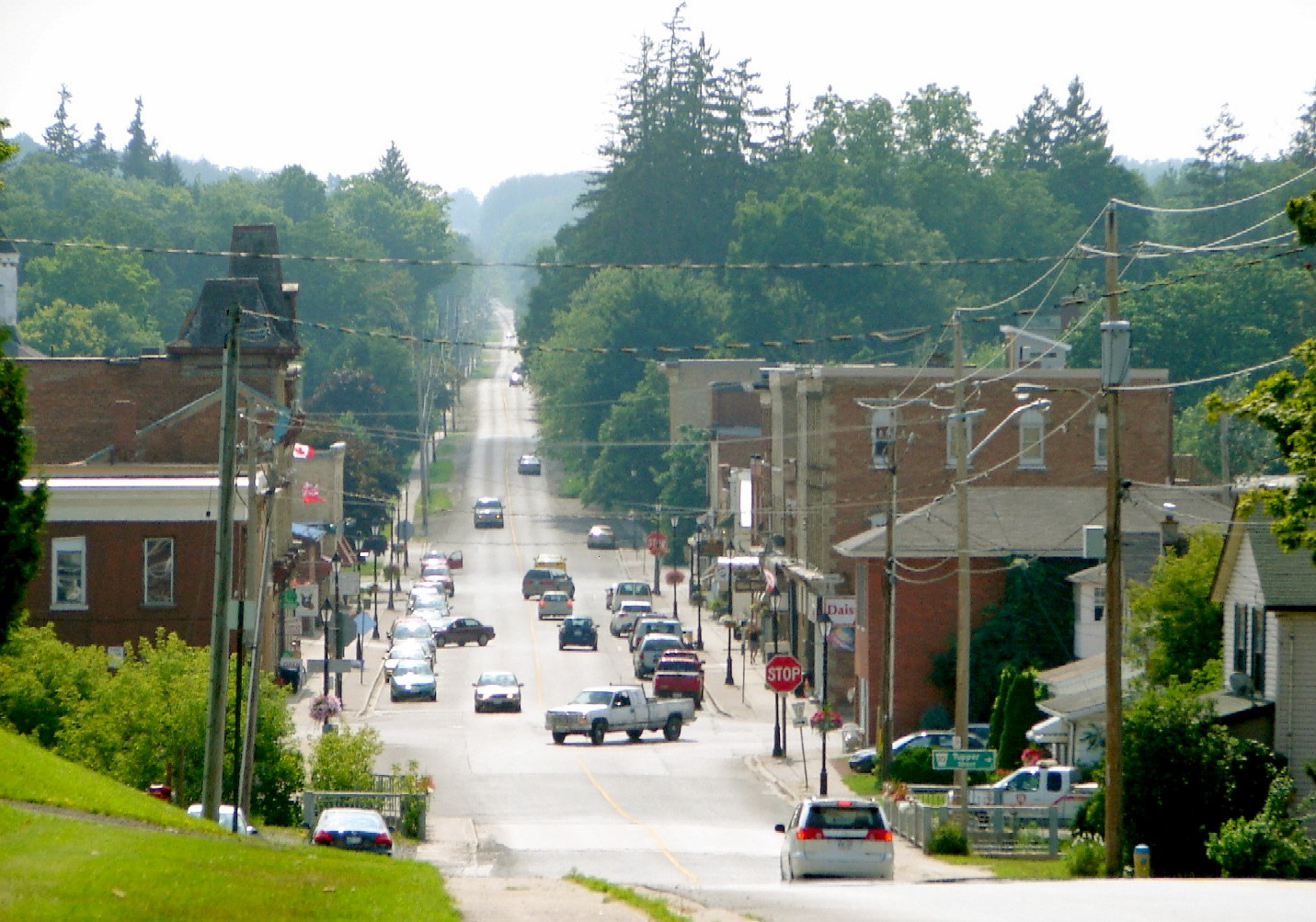
Millbrook

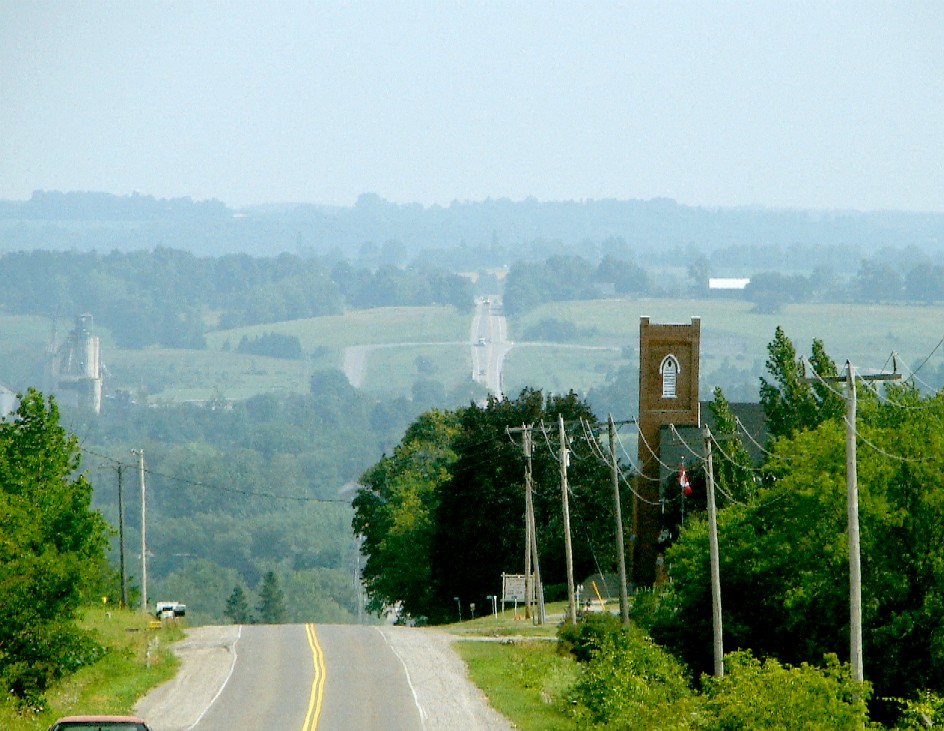
Ida

=== Millbrook ===
Millbrook is the township's population centre. The commercial businesses and services (banking, government) are found along King Street and County Road 10. County Road 10 provides Millbrook with convenient connections with Ontario Highway 115 and Ontario Highway 401.

It has been a filming location for several movie productions. Anne with an E (a 2017 CBC production), Sunshine Sketches of a Little Town (a 2011 CBC production), The Music Man, Ice Princess, Let It Snow, Feel The Beat, The Town Christmas Forgot and A History of Violence were filmed in the town. In the latter film, Millbrook was depicted as the fictional town of Millbrook, Indiana.

The political cartoonist Sam Hunter was born and raised in Millbrook, along with award-winning filmmaker Jared Raab, esteemed Aquatic Science Biologist Dustin Raab with Fisheries and Oceans Canada, and Juno Award winning singer/songwriter Serena Ryder. Country music singer-songwriter Jade Eagleson was raised in Bailieboro.

== Demographics ==
In the 2021 Census of Population conducted by Statistics Canada, Cavan Monaghan had a population of 10,016 living in 3,553 of its 3,704 total private dwellings, a change of 13.4% from its 2016 population of 8,829. With a land area of 306.39 km^{2} (118.30 sq mi), it had a population density of 32.7/km^{2} (84.7/sq mi) in 2021.

Canada census – Cavan Monaghan community profile

	2021	2016	2011
Population	10,016 (+13.4% from 2016)	8,829 (+2.7% from 2011)	8,601 (-2.6% from 2006)
Land area	306.39 km^{2} (118.30 sq mi)	306.33 km^{2} (118.27 sq mi)	306.22 km^{2} (118.23 sq mi)
Population density	32.7/km^{2} (85/sq mi)	28.8/km^{2} (75/sq mi)	28.1/km^{2} (73/sq mi)
Median age	44.8 (M: 43.6, F: 45.6)	46.1 (M: 45.6, F: 46.6)
Private dwellings	3,704 (total) 3,553 (occupied)	3,271 (total)	3,221 (total)
Median household income	$110,000	$90,957

References: 2021 2016 2011

Cavan Monaghan historical populations

Year	Pop.	±%
1976	1,997	—
1981	2,063	+3.3%
1986	2,105	+2.0%
1991	2,435	+15.7%
1996	2,522	+3.6%

Year	Pop.	±%
2001	8,453	+235.2%
2006	8,828	+4.4%
2011	8,601	−2.6%
2016	8,829	+2.7%
2021	10,016	+13.4%

Population amounts prior to 1998 are total of Cavan TP, Millbrook VL, and North Monaghan TP.
Source: Statistics Canada

== Economy and infrastructure ==
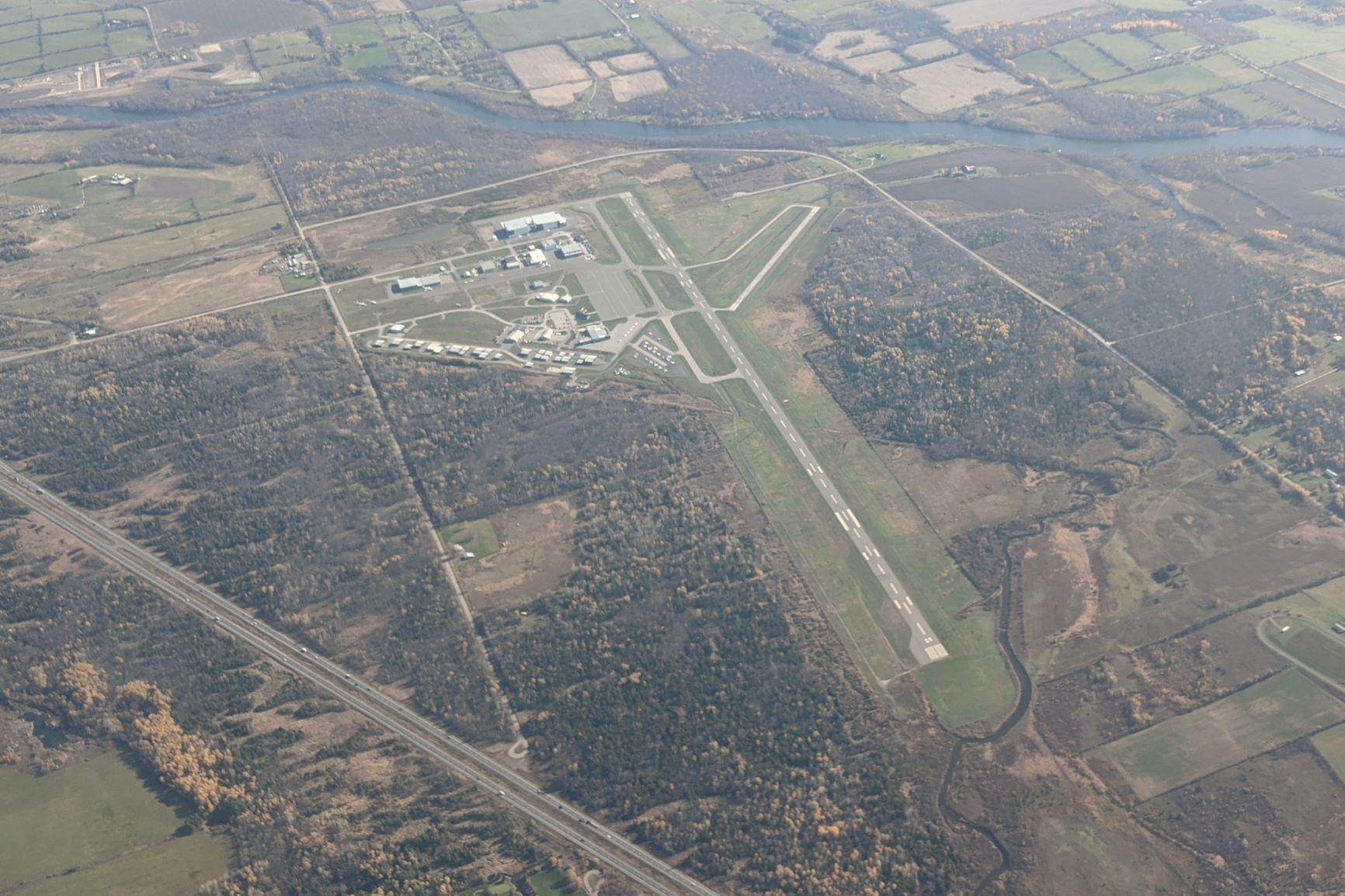
Peterborough Regional Airport in 2020

Cavan is home to Alltech's corn feed facility under the Masterfeeds brand. It was formerly owned by Maple Leaf Foods which opened a feed facility on Peterborough County Road 10 just north of Ontario Highway 115. Opened in 1975, the facility was then owned by Maple Leaf Mills, which relocated from the Maple Leaf Mills Silos in downtown Toronto.

Peterborough Regional Airport is located between Highway 115 and the Otonabee River on the east side of the township. The airport's land is within the boundaries of Cavan Monaghan, but has been owned by the city of Peterborough since 1967.

== Culture ==
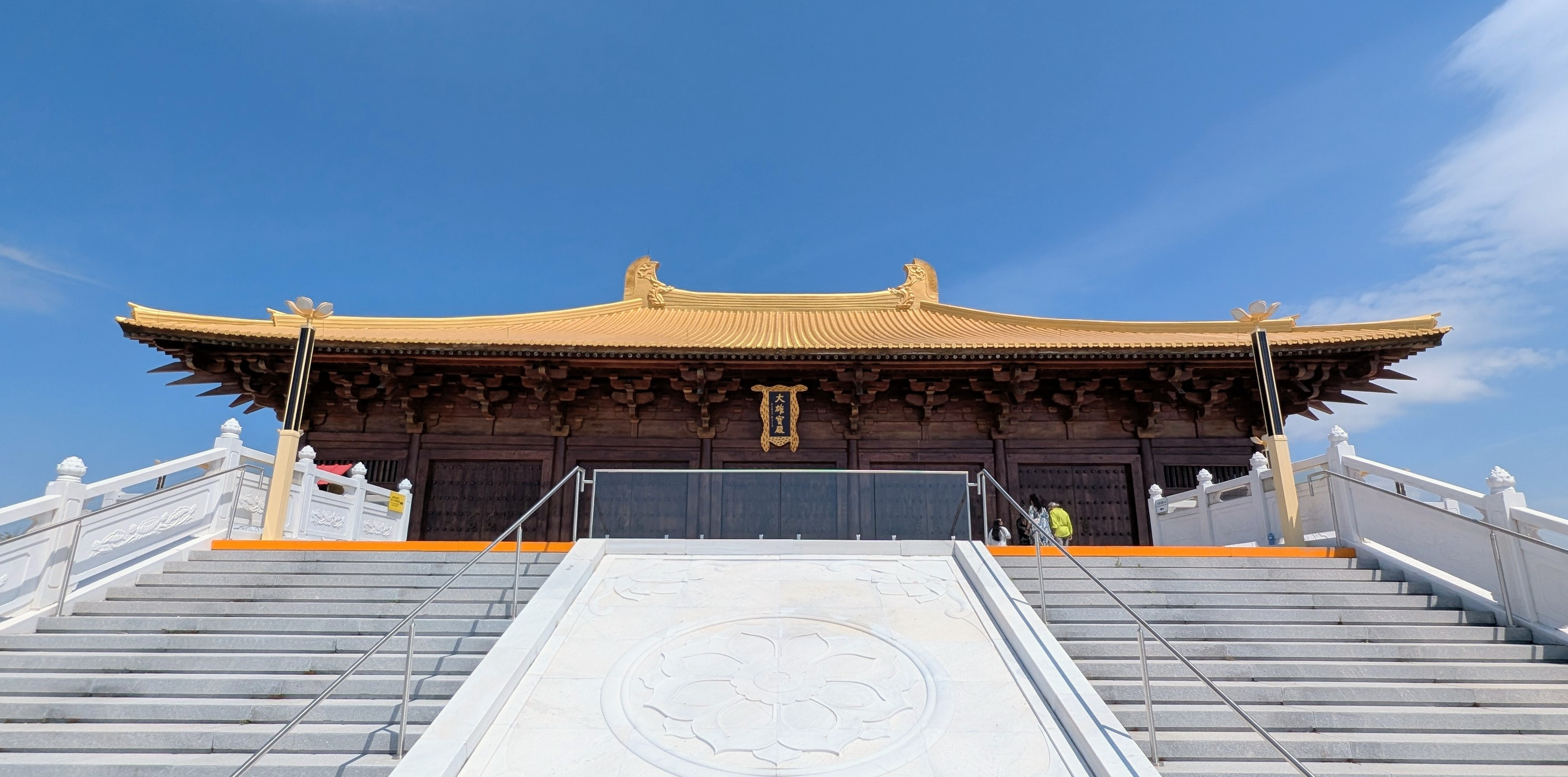
The Main Hall at Wutai Shan Buddhist Garden

4th Line Theatre is an theatre company that presents outdoor productions of Canadian plays every summer at Winslow Farm in Millbrook.

Wutai Shan Buddhist Garden is located on Ski Hill Road in the northwest corner of Cavan Monaghan. Opened in 2019, it is the largest Chinese Buddhist site in Canada, covering 535 acres (217 ha).

The local newspaper is the Millbrook Times, established in 1987.

== Recreation ==
Peterborough Speedway

Peterborough Speedway is a 1/3 mile motor racing oval which has been in operation since 1967. The speedway hosts a weekly Saturday night stock car racing program from May to October each year including the annual Autumn Colours Classic. The weekend of races takes place during the Thanksgiving holiday weekend and is considered one of the most important stock car events in Ontario.

The Ganaraska Hiking Trail follows much of Cavan Monaghan's western border with the City of Kawartha Lakes. This segment of the trail connects the Victoria Rail Trail in the north to Ganaraska Forest in the south.

== See also ==
- List of townships in Ontario
- List of correctional facilities in Ontario - Ontario Licence Plates were made at the Millbrook Correctional Centre, 1974-2003
