= List of numbered roads in Peterborough County =

List of county roads

This is a list of numbered roads in Peterborough County, Ontario, Canada.

Number	Local Name(s)	Western/Southern Terminus	Eastern/Northern Terminus	Settlements served	Additional Notes
Peterborough County Road 1	Lindsay Road	Highway 7	County Road 18	Fowlers Corners	Formerly Highway 7B
Peterborough County Road 2	Carmel Line; Bensfort Road; North Rice Lake Road; Albert Street West	County Road 28	County Road 45	Bailieboro, Bensfort, Keene, Villiers, Birdsalls Station, Hastings	
Peterborough County Road 3	Parkhill Road West	Highway 7	County Road 27	Peterborough	minor connecting route
Peterborough County Road 4	Parkhill Road East; Warsaw Road; Water Street; County Road 4	Inverlea Bridge, Peterborough	County Road 6	Peterborough, Donwood, Five Corners, Warsaw	
Peterborough County Road 5	Lansdowne Road	Highway 7	Peterborough city limits	Murray Hill, Peterborough	
Peterborough County Road 6	Stony Lake Road; 3rd Line North; County Road 6 Unimin Road	Highway 28	County Road 46	Galesburg, Hall Glen, Gilchrist Bay, Clarina, Nephton, Blue Mountain	
Peterborough County Road 8	County Road 8 Webster Road; Line Road 5 Dummer-Asphodel Road	County Road 4	County Road 40	Douro, Cottesloe, South Dummer	
Peterborough County Road 9	Mount Pleasant Road; Sherbrooke Street	County Road 10	Brealey Drive	Mount Pleasant, Peterborough	
Peterborough County Road 10	County Road 10; Queen Mary Street	Challice 1st Line	Hayes Line	Mount Pleasant, Ida, Cavan, Millbrook, Carmel	a.k.a. Tupper Street and Duke Street in Millbrook
Peterborough County Road 11	Moncrief Line; Airport Road	County Road 28	Brown Line	Peterborough Airport	
Peterborough County Road 12	Fife's Bay Road; Lily Lake Road	Fairbairn Street, Peterborough	Maryland Drive	Peterborough, Fife's Bay, Stewart Heights	
Peterborough County Road 15	Monaghan Parkway	Highway 7	Peterborough city limits	none	Formerly Highway 7
Peterborough County Road 16	Robinson Road; Ennis Road; Tara Road; Blackpool Road	County Road 14	Anchor Bay Road	Youngstown, Ennismore	
Peterborough County Road 17	Robinson Road; Listowel Line; Emerald Isle Road	County Road 16	Harrington Line	Emerald Isle, Connaught Shore	
Peterborough County Road 18	Chemong Road; Ward Street; 8th Line	Peterborough city limits	County Road 29	Chemong Park, Bridgenorth, Chemong Heights	Formerly Highway 7B (County Road 1 – Peterborough
Peterborough County Road 19	3rd Line	County Road 18	Hilliard Street, Peterborough	none	minor connecting route
Peterborough County Road 20	Selwyn Road; 12th Line; Young's Point Road	County Road 18	Highway 28	Selwyn Shores, Selwyn, Young's Point	
Peterborough County Road 21	5th Line; Wallace Point Road	Glamorgan Road	County Road 39	Millbrook, Wallace Point, Stewarts Hall, Cold Springs	
Peterborough County Road 22	Curve Lake Road	Westview Road	County Road 23	Curve Lake native reserve	
Peterborough County Road 23	Buckhorn Road	County Road 29	County Road 36	Selwyn, Buckhorn	
Peterborough County Road 24	Centre Line	Peterborough city limits	County Road 18	Terra View Heights	
Peterborough County Road 25	Young's Point Road	County Road 18	County Road 20	none	western shore route along Lake Katchewanooka
Peterborough County Road 27	Ackison Road	County Road 3	County Road 12	none	minor connecting route
Peterborough County Road 28	County Road 28	Eagleson 1st Line	Highway 7	Fraserville, South Monaghan, Bailieboro	Formerly Highway 28
Peterborough County Road 29	Lakefield Road; Bridge Street; Queen Street	Peterborough city limits	Highway 28	Lakefield	Formerly Highway 28
Peterborough County Road 30	County Road 30	the Trent River	Old Norwood Road	Trent River	
Peterborough County Road 31	Hiawatha Line	Paudash Street, Hiawatha	County Road 2	Hiawatha native reserve	
Peterborough County Road 32	River Road; Water Street	Peterborough city limits	County Road 29	Lakefield	
Peterborough County Road 33	County Road 33	County Road 32	Highway 28	Lakefield	
Peterborough County Road 34	Heritage Line; Serpent Mounds Road	Serpent Mounds Park	Highway 7	Lang, Keene, Serpent Mounds Park	
Peterborough County Road 35	Keene Road; Television Road	County Road 2	the Trent Canal	Zion, Assumption, Peterborough	
Peterborough County Road 36	County Road 36	Kawartha Lakes city (former Victoria County) limits	Highway 28	Nogies Creek, Flynns, Buckhorn, Burleighs Falls	Formerly Highway 36
Peterborough County Road 37	Lakehurst Road	Anchor Bay Road	County Road 36	Buckhorn	
Peterborough County Road 38	2nd Line Road	County Road 4	County Road 2	Birdsalls Station, Warsaw	
Peterborough County Road 39	Bensfort Road	County Road 2	Highway 7	Cold Springs	
Peterborough County Road 40	Dummer Road; County Road 40	Highway 7	County Road 6	Norwood, Centre Dummer	
Peterborough County Road 42	County Road 42	County Road 45	County Road 30	Norwood, Trent River	
Peterborough County Road 44	South Lake Road	County Road 46	County Road 6	none	bush route connecting Stony Lake and Havelock
Peterborough County Road 45	Bridge Street North; Albert Street East; County Road 45; Victoria Street	the Trent River	Highway 7	Hastings, Norwood	Formerly Highway 45
Peterborough County Road 46	Concession Street; County Road 46	Old Norwood Road	County Road 504	Havelock, Rush Point, Round Lake, Oak Lake, Lasswade	
Peterborough County Road 47	County Road 47	County Road 44	County Road 46	none	minor connecting route
Peterborough County Road 48	Mary Street; County Road 48	Highway 7	Vansickle Road	Havelock, Chase Corners, Freeman Corners, Cordova Mines	
Peterborough County Road 50	County Road 50	Trent River Road	Highway 7	Preneveau	
Peterborough County Road 52	Jack Lake Road	Fire Route #88	County Road 504	Apsley, Jack Lake	
Peterborough County Road 54	Balmer Road	County Road 620	Pleasant Point Road	Chandos Lake, Little Loon Lake	
Peterborough County Road 56	Northey's Bay Road	Highway 28	County Road 6	Woodview, Stonyridge, Petroglyphs Provincial Park	
Peterborough County Road 503	Monck Road	Reid Street, Kinmount	White Boundary Road	Furnace Falls, Kinmount	Formerly Highway 503
Peterborough County Road 504	County Road 504; Wellington Street	Highway 28	County Road 620	Apsley, Lasswade, Owenbrook	Formerly Highway 504
Peterborough County Road 507	County Road 507	County Road 36	Fox Lake Drive	Flynns, Rockcroft, Mississauga Landing, Catchacoma	Formerly Highway 507
Peterborough County Road 620	County Road 620	Highway 28	County Road 504	Clydesdale Lake, Glen Alda	Formerly Highway 620
Peterborough County Road 620A	Burleigh Street	County Road 620	County Road 504	Apsley	Formerly Highway 620A
