= Young's Point, Ontario =

Village in Ontario, Canada

Coordinates: 44°29′20″N 78°14′06″W

Young's Point is a small village in Ontario, Canada, established in 1825. It is about 25 kilometres (16 mi) north of Peterborough.

Young's Point gets its name from the founders of the village. The Young family, nine children plus widower Francis Young (1781–1859) of Newport, County Tipperary, Ireland, whose wife Elizabeth Blackall had predeceased him in Ireland, settled the area in 1825. Young was a civil engineer and built a dam and grist mill here. References are recorded in Susanna Moodie's Book "Roughing it in the Bush." Later generations ran a store and built and operated the steamboat service for both cargo and passenger service to nearby Stony (or Stoney) Lake. The Stoney Lake Navigation Company office was near the original Young family homestead where a cairn now stands at Lock 27. The Lockside Trading Company is home to one of the later generation buildings.

Young's Point is the home of Lock 27 of the Trent-Severn Waterway network. The lock has a lift of seven feet and was built in the early 1870s. To the south you can travel through Katchewanooka Lake towards Lakefield and on to Peterborough, and to the north you can travel through Clear Lake and on to Stony Lake, Buckhorn Lake, Pigeon Lake, and beyond.

In 1887 the Old Bridge Inn was built; originally run as a general store (the Kearney Store), it's now a bed and breakfast.

The old Lakefield Bridge Warren truss which carried Old Highway 28 was replaced by the current twin span Warren pony truss and beam bridges which carries Ontario Highway 28 over the top of Ontanbee River to South Beach.

In addition, Young's Point is host to several recreational facilities, including, but not limited to; a golf course, several bed & breakfast hotels, marinas and restaurants.

With a low population density and significant amounts of privately owned wooded land, Young's Point is also a favorite spot for residents of nearby Peterborough and Lakefield to hunt, fish, partake in off-road activities (both motorized and not), and play paintball.

Young's Point is also home to Mink Island and the "Legend of the Wailing Woman," a local legend about a previous resident (named Abbirah) of the island. A documented fact of the Ojibwe in the area is the story of Polly Lee, a young woman who was to marry a resident of the neighboring Algonquin clan. As the daughter of the chieftain known as "Handsome Jack," this was a marriage of prestige and the Youngs were invited as the local white heads of the clan. Unfortunately, she died from influenza and is buried on a tiny island south of the hamlet. Although long gone now, a silver cup had been placed on her grave by Jack to ensure she could get to Katchewanooka for water. Jack's Lake, north of Burleigh Falls, Ontario, was named after “Handsome Jack.” Lovesick Lake in Burleigh Falls, Ontario was named after Polly and her doomed love affair, as is Lee Island, south of the point where she is buried.

Another persistent rumour is that somewhere in Clear Lake a steamboat filled with weapons and gold sunk somewhere in the lake during a storm. To give credit to this story, some of the weapons have floated to shore over the years. Scuba divers and sailors hunt the lake.

Just northwest at the bottom of Clear Lake was the South Beach Hotel, a well known locale that existed for 100 years and was destroyed by fire twice. Indigenous and white immigrants "mostly" congregated well here and it was the home for ice race drivers and sailing. The South Beach Yacht Club (SBYC) began as a group of old salty sailors who raced their sailboats on Sundays. It was also the home of the Canadian Windsurfing Championships in 1977 and 1987.

Two kilometres north of the hamlet, The Canadian Shield begins. It is said to be the limit of where the Windigo can travel.
