= Douro-Dummer =

- Township (lower-tier)
- Township of Douro-Dummer
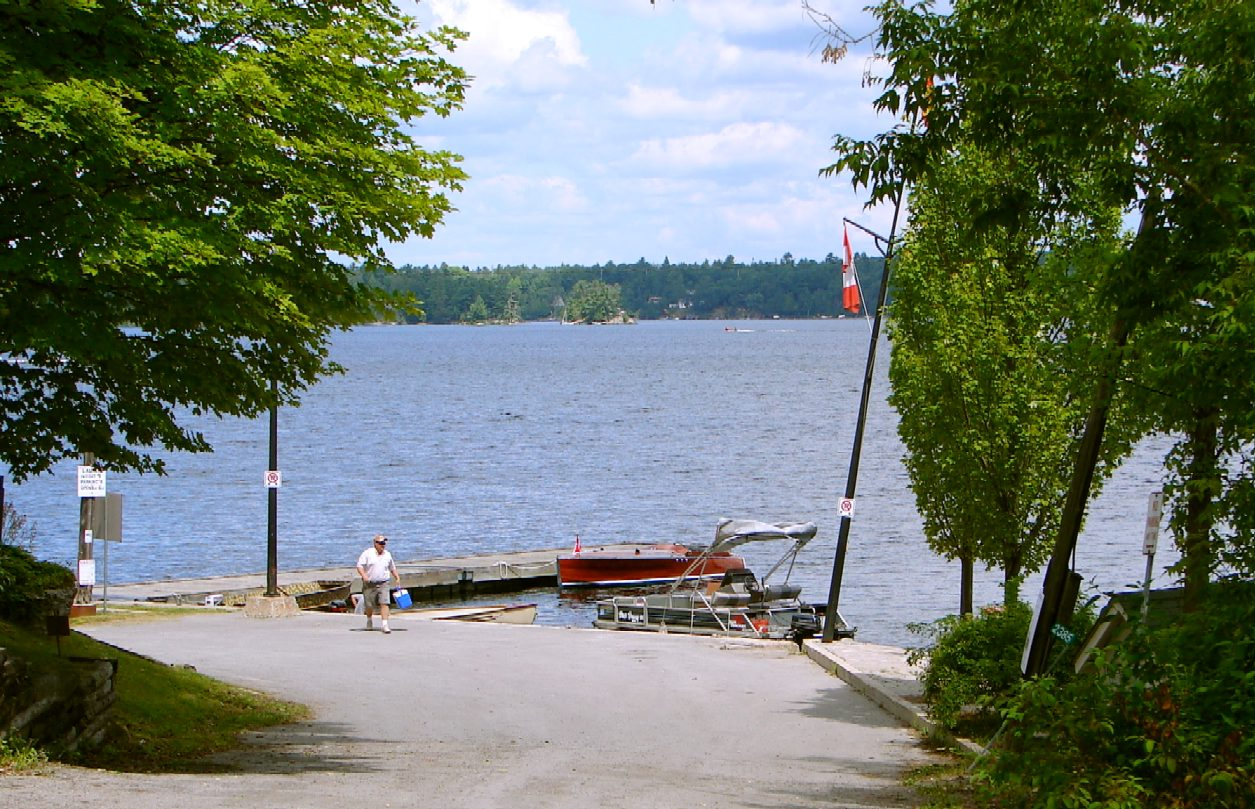
- Crowes Landing on Stoney Lake

- Location within Peterborough County Location within Southern Ontario
- Coordinates: 44°27′N 78°06′W
- Country: Canada
- Province: Ontario
- County: Peterborough
- Settled: 1830s
- Formed: January 1, 1998

Government
  - Type: Township
  - Mayor: Heather Watson
  - Fed. riding: Peterborough
  - Prov. riding: Peterborough—Kawartha

Area
  - Land: 459.46 km^{2} (177.40 sq mi)

Population (2021)
  - Total: 7,632
  - Density: 16.6/km^{2} (43/sq mi)
- Time zone: UTC-5 (EST)
  - Summer (DST): UTC-4 (EDT)
- Postal Codes: K0L 2B0, K0L 2H0 & K0L 3A0 & K9J
- Area codes: 705, 249
- Website: www.dourodummer.on.ca

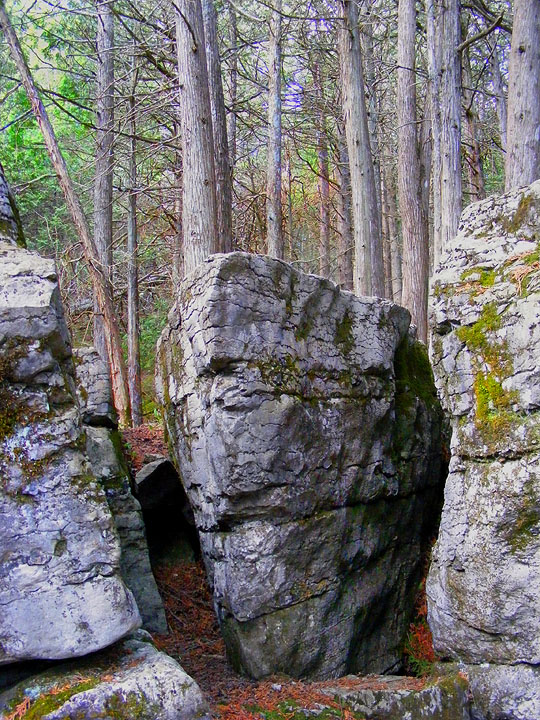
Warsaw Caves, Ontario

Douro-Dummer is a township in central-eastern Ontario, Canada, in Peterborough County along the Trent-Severn Waterway. It was formed on January 1, 1998, through the amalgamation of Douro and Dummer Townships.

The township is the site of drumlins known as the Drumlins of Douro, and home of the Warsaw Caves (near the community of Warsaw).

Douro's general store was run by the same family since 1896, Patrick George Towns after moving the store opened in his hometown Peterborough in 1892; however, it closed its doors for the last time in Sunday, September 4, 2016. It was reopened as Towns and Leahy Merchantile and Deli in 2017, but it was destroyed by a fire in 2018.

== Communities ==
The township comprises the communities of:

- Centre Dummer
- Clarina
- Cottesloe
- Crowe's Landing
- Donwood
- Douro
- Five Corners - referring to convergence of Douro Seventh Line, Nassau Road and Peterborough County Road 4
- Galesburg - south of Clear Lake
- Guerin - along Indian River
- Hall's Glen
- parts of Stony Lake, including McCracken's Landing and Juniper Island
- South Beach
- South Dummer
- Warsaw - south end of Quarry Lake and seat of municipal government
- Young's Point

== History ==
The area was historically inhabited by Mississaugas First Nations. After the Rice Lake Treaty #20 was signed in 1818, in which 1,951,000 acres (790,000 ha) of land north of Rice Lake were surrendered, both Douro and Dummer townships were opened for settlement. Douro Township was named in honour of one of the battles in the Peninsula War. In 1823, Dummer Township was surveyed, and in 1831, 2,000 Irish and English settlers arrived there to begin colonization, who were granted 100 acres (40 ha) of land per family. In 1841, the first post office in Dummer Township opened. By that time, both townships were fully settled.

== Demographics ==
In the 2021 Census of Population conducted by Statistics Canada, Douro-Dummer had a population of 7,632 living in 2,925 of its 3,601 total private dwellings, a change of 13.8% from its 2016 population of 6,709. With a land area of 459.46 km^{2} (177.40 sq mi), it had a population density of 16.6/km^{2} (43.0/sq mi) in 2021.

Canada census – Douro-Dummer community profile

| | 2021 | 2016 | 2011 |
| Population | 7,632 (+13.8% from 2016) | 6,709 (-1.4% from 2011) | 6,805 (-2.1% from 2006) |
| Land area | 459.46 km^{2} (177.40 sq mi) | 458.95 km^{2} (177.20 sq mi) | 458.98 km^{2} (177.21 sq mi) |
| Population density | 16.6/km^{2} (43/sq mi) | 14.6/km^{2} (38/sq mi) | 14.8/km^{2} (38/sq mi) |
| Median age | 48.4 (M: 48.0, F: 48.8) | 45.5 (M: 45.3, F: 45.7) |
| Private dwellings | 3,601 (total) 2,925 (occupied) | 3,434 (total) | 3,110 (total) |
| Median household income | $96,000 | $80,352 |

References: 2021 2016 2011

Historical census populations – Douro-Dummer
| Year | Pop. | ±% |
|---|---|---|
| 1996 | 6,724 | — |
| 2001 | 6,652 | −1.1% |
| 2006 | 6,954 | +4.5% |
| 2011 | 6,805 | −2.1% |
| 2016 | 6,709 | −1.4% |
| 2021 | 7,632 | +13.8% |
Source: Statistics Canada

== Local government ==
Douro-Dummer is governed by a mayor, deputy-mayor and three councillors. As of the 2022 election, the elected council members are:

- Mayor: Heather Watson
- Deputy Mayor: Harold Nelson
- Councillor at Large: Thomas G. Watt
- Councillors:
  - Ward 1: Ray Johnston
  - Ward 2: Adam Vervoort

== Notable people ==
- Ronnie Hawkins, American-born Canadian musician, Rockabilly Legend (resident 1970-2017)
- Leahy, Canadian folk rock band (family homestead)
- Susanna Moodie 1803-1885, Pioneer, English-born Canadian writer and newspaper editor (former resident 1832-1840)
- Catharine Parr Traill 1802-1899, Pioneer, English-born Canadian writer, naturalist and sister of Susanna Moodie (former resident 1832-1840)

== See also ==
- List of townships in Ontario
