= Peterborough County =

- County (upper-tier)
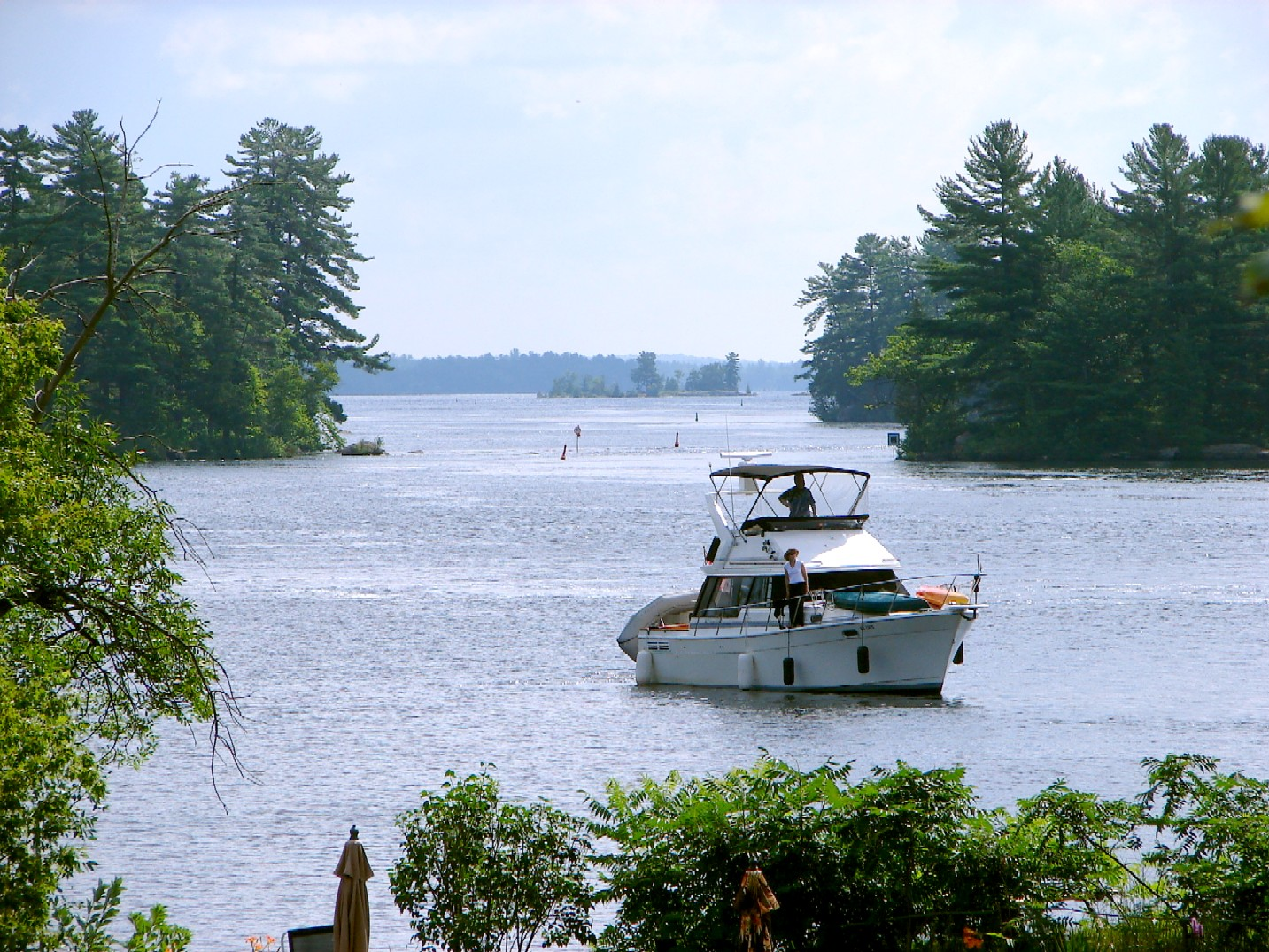
- Lower Buckhorn Lake

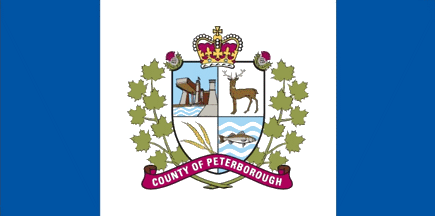
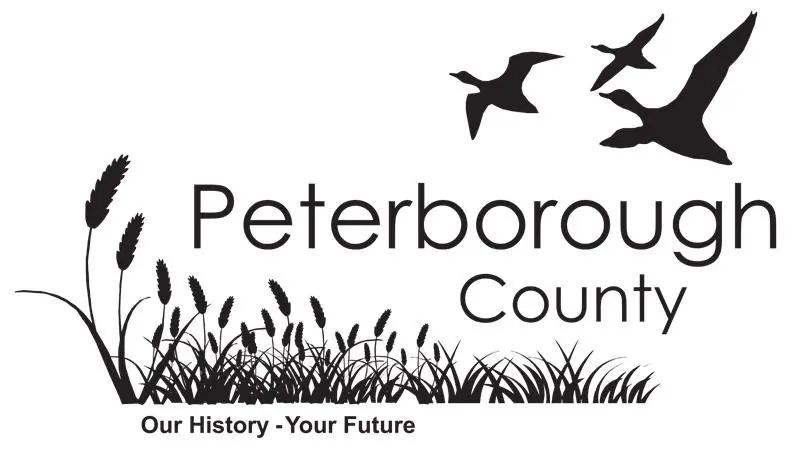
- Flag Logo

- Location of Peterborough County
- Coordinates: 44°30′N 78°10′W
- Country: Canada
- Province: Ontario
- Region: Central Ontario
- Founded: 1838 (as District of Colborne)
- County seat: Peterborough
- Municipalities: List: Asphodel-Norwood; Cavan Monaghan; Douro-Dummer; Havelock-Belmont-Methuen; North Kawartha; Otonabee-South Monaghan; Selwyn; Trent Lakes

Area
  - Land: 3,714.71 km^{2} (1,434.26 sq mi)
  - Census division: 3,779.47 km^{2} (1,459.26 sq mi)
- Land area excludes Peterborough

Population (2021)
  - Total: 64,030
  - Density: 17.2/km^{2} (45/sq mi)
  - Census division: 147,681
  - Census division density: 39.1/km^{2} (101/sq mi)
- Total excludes Peterborough
- Time zone: UTC-5 (EST)
  - Summer (DST): UTC-4 (EDT)
- Website: www.county.peterborough.on.ca

Peterborough County is a county and census division located in Southern Ontario, Canada. The county seat is the City of Peterborough, which is independent of the county.

The southern section of the county is mix of agriculture, urban and lakefront properties. The northern section of the county is mostly sparsely populated wilderness, with numerous rivers and lakes mostly within Kawartha Highlands Provincial Park.

The county contains the Kawarthas, a major tourist region.

== History ==
Map of Peterborough County, showing townships and main settlements.

=== Origins and evolution ===
In 1615, Samuel de Champlain was one of the first western explorers who traveled through the area, coming down from Lake Chemong and portaging down a trail, which is approximated by present-day Chemong Road, to the Otonabee River and stayed for a brief time near the present-day site of Bridgenorth, just north of Peterborough.

The area was initially part of Northumberland County, which was formed by proclamation of the first Lieutenant Governor of Upper Canada, John Graves Simcoe in 1792, and defined by statute in 1798. In 1802, Northumberland was included in the Newcastle District. In 1841, the northern part of the District was detached to form the Colborne District, with the northern portion of Northumberland county made into the new County of Peterborough. It consisted of the following territory:

Organization of the Colborne District (1841)
County of Peterborough

The townships of

- Belmont
- Methurn
- Burleigh
- Dummer
- Asphodel
- Otonabee
- Douro
- Smith
- Ennismore
- Harvey
- Verulam
- Emily
- Ops
- Fenelon
- Mariposa
- Eldon
- Bexley
- Somerville

and

- the seven rear concessions of Monaghan
- the unsurveyed lands in rear thereof, and the Islands lying wholly or in greater part opposite thereto...

The county was named in honor of Col. Peter Robinson, who in 1825 brought 2,000 settlers from Ireland. The route taken was by way of Port Hope, Rice Lake and the Otonabee River, the same route used by the first settlers that entered this region in 1818.

The centre of the County was originally the courthouse, which is still considered an important historical site.

In 1851, Peterborough County was divided into the counties of Peterborough and Victoria, which were united for municipal purposes as the United Counties of Peterborough and Victoria.

Townships forming the United Counties of Peterborough and Victoria (1851)
County of Peterborough	County of Victoria
Belmont; Methuen; Burleigh; Dummer; Harvey; Douro; Smith; Monaghan North; Asphodel; Ennismore; Otonabee	Mariposa; Ops; Emily; Eldon; Fenelon; Bexley; Verulam; Somerville

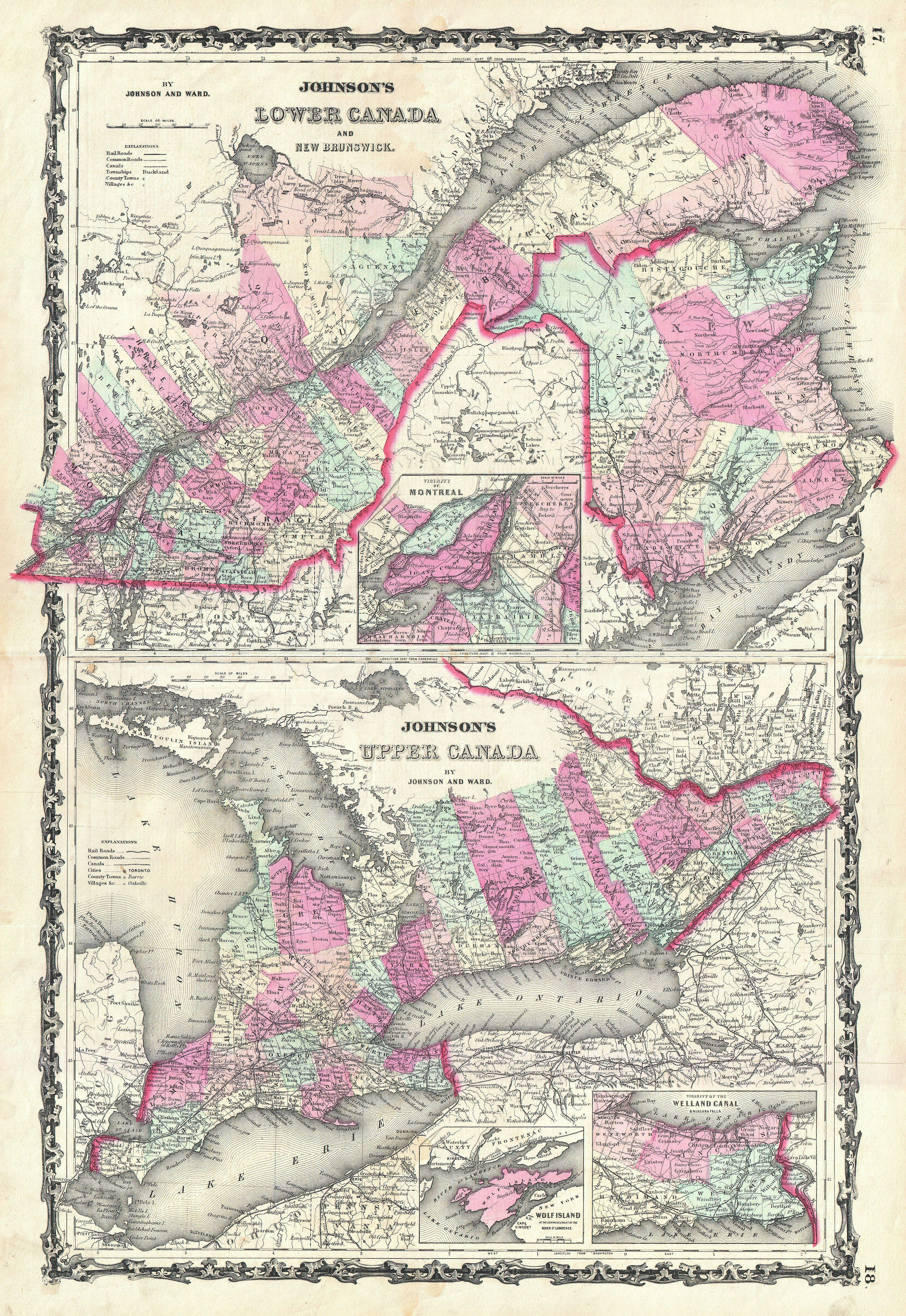
1862 Johnson Map of Ontario, showing full extent of Peterborough County at that time in pink.

A plebiscite was authorized in 1856 to facilitate the creation of a provisional county council for Victoria, but, as the united counties council delayed conducting it, a further Act was passed in 1861 to compel its being held, following which the provisional council was formed. and its formal separation took place in 1863.

Further townships were surveyed, thus extending the reach of the County northwards. In 1874, the townships of Bruton, Cardiff, Dysart, Dudley, Glamorgan, Guilford, Harburn, Harcourt, Minden, Monmouth, Snowden and Stanhope were withdrawn from the County and transferred to the new Provisional County of Haliburton.

After the transfer of the northern townships to Haliburton, the remainder of the County consisted of the following:

Townships forming the County of Peterborough (1874)
Townships	Area	Opened	Description
Asphodel	37,871 acres (59.2 sq mi; 153.3 km^{2})	1821	Named after the Greek word for lily.
Belmont and Methuen	Area 81,088 acres (127 sq mi; 328 km^{2})	1823	By 1842 it had only 33 householders; in 1866 only 185. Townships were mainly rock, lake and stream.
Burleigh and Anstruther	32,160 acres (50 sq mi; 130 km^{2})	1861	First Post Office was called Burleigh. Separated from Dummer Township in 1865.
Chandos	56,225 acres (88 sq mi; 228 km^{2})	1862	Named after the Duke of Buckingham and Chandos
Douro	34,446 acres (54 sq mi; 139 km^{2})	1821	Named after the Battle of Douro in the Peninsular War.
Dummer	68,812 acres (108 sq mi; 278 km^{2})	1821	Named in honor of William Dummer Powell, Chief Justice of Upper Canada. A Colony of immigrants came in 1831, of whom 150 were sent out by the Marquess of Bath.
Ennismore	17,245 acres (27 sq mi; 70 km^{2})	1829	Named in honor of William Hare, Viscount Ennismore, formerly M.P. for Cork City in the Parliament of Ireland, who died in 1827. Originally it was called Emily Gore.
Galway and Cavendish	57,218 acres (89 sq mi; 232 km^{2})	1857/1862	
Harvey	68,755 acres (107 sq mi; 278 km^{2})	1821	Named after Sir John Harvey, Deputy Adjutant General in Canada during the War of 1812. Was part of Smith township until 1866. First settler were retired officers who come in 1832, but did not succeed.
North Monaghan	14,096 acres (22 sq mi; 57 km^{2})	1820	
Otonabee	64,024 acres (100 sq mi; 259 km^{2})	1820	Named after the Otonabee River. The word in the Ojibwe language signifies a delta.
Smith	58,043 acres (90.7 sq mi; 234.9 km^{2})	1819	Settled by Allen Otty.

The Town of Peterborough became a City in 1905, and was subsequently withdrawn from the County for municipal purposes.

In 1974, as a result of the creation of the Regional Municipality of Durham, the township of Cavan and the village of Millbrook were withdrawn from Durham County, and the township of South Monaghan was withdrawn from Northumberland County, to be transferred to Peterborough County.

=== Current municipalities ===
As a consequence of the Common Sense Revolution in Ontario, the County was restructured into the following municipalities during the period 1997-2004:

- Township of Asphodel-Norwood
- Township of Cavan-Monaghan
- Township of Douro-Dummer
- Township of Havelock-Belmont-Methuen
- Township of North Kawartha
- Township of Otonabee-South Monaghan
- Township of Selwyn
- Municipality (Township) of Trent Lakes

Two First Nations reserves are independent of county administration:

- Curve Lake First Nation 35
- Hiawatha First Nation

== Demographics ==
Canada census – Peterborough County (census division) community profile

	2021	2016	2011
Population	147,681 (+6.8% from 2016)	138,236 (+2.5% from 2011)	134,933 (1.4% from 2006)
Land area	3,779.47 km^{2} (1,459.26 sq mi)	3,848.20 km^{2} (1,485.80 sq mi)	3,847.77 km^{2} (1,485.63 sq mi)
Population density	39.1/km^{2} (101/sq mi)	35.9/km^{2} (93/sq mi)	35.1/km^{2} (91/sq mi)
Median age	46.8 (M: 45.2, F: 48.4)	46.9 (M: 45.4, F: 48.3)	45.7 (M: 44.3, F: 46.7)
Private dwellings	73,045 (total) 61,741 (occupied)	70,551 (total) 57,743 (occupied)	68,009 (total)
Median household income	$78,500	$64,437

Notes: Includes City of Peterborough
References: 2021 2016 2011

Historical census populations – Peterborough County

Year	Pop.	±%
1921	42,261	—
1931	43,958	+4.0%
1941	47,392	+7.8%
1951	60,789	+28.3%
1956	67,981	+11.8%
1961	76,375	+12.3%

Year	Pop.	±%
1966	81,959	+7.3%
1971	87,804	+7.1%
1976	99,930	+13.8%
1981	102,452	+2.5%
1986	105,056	+2.5%
1991	119,992	+14.2%

Year	Pop.	±%
1996	123,448	+2.9%
2001	125,856	+2.0%
2006	133,080	+5.7%
2011	134,933	+1.4%
2016	138,236	+2.4%
2021	147,681	+6.8%

Includes City of Peterborough. Population counts are not adjusted for boundary changes.
Source: Statistics Canada

Panethnic groups in Peterborough County (2001−2021)
Panethnic group	2021		2016		2011		2006		2001	
Panethnic group	Pop.	%	Pop.	%	Pop.	%	Pop.	%	Pop.	%
European (Note: Statistic includes all persons that did not make up part of a visible minority or an indigenous identity.)	128,150	88.48%	123,010	91.07%	123,080	93.29%	124,165	94.41%	117,560	95.11%
Indigenous	7,095	4.9%	6,160	4.56%	4,810	3.65%	4,145	3.15%	3,085	2.5%
South Asian	3,030	2.09%	1,565	1.16%	885	0.67%	680	0.52%	965	0.78%
East Asian (Note: Statistic includes total responses of "Chinese", "Korean", and "Japanese" under visible minority section on census.)	1,630	1.13%	1,395	1.03%	955	0.72%	1,060	0.81%	815	0.66%
African	1,620	1.12%	1,005	0.74%	785	0.6%	625	0.48%	500	0.4%
Southeast Asian (Note: Statistic includes total responses of "Filipino" and "Southeast Asian" under visible minority section on census.)	1,270	0.88%	870	0.64%	590	0.45%	295	0.22%	260	0.21%
Middle Eastern (Note: Statistic includes total responses of "West Asian" and "Arab" under visible minority section on census.)	855	0.59%	435	0.32%	310	0.23%	190	0.14%	120	0.1%
Latin American	530	0.37%	245	0.18%	240	0.18%	265	0.2%	140	0.11%
Other (Note: Statistic includes total responses of "Visible minority, n.i.e." and "Multiple visible minorities" under visible minority section on census.)	660	0.46%	405	0.3%	255	0.19%	95	0.07%	160	0.13%
Total responses	144,840	98.08%	135,075	97.71%	131,930	97.78%	131,520	98.83%	123,600	98.21%
Total population	147,681	100%	138,236	100%	134,928	100%	133,080	100%	125,856	100%
Note: Totals greater than 100% due to multiple origin responses

== Major places ==
=== Cities ===
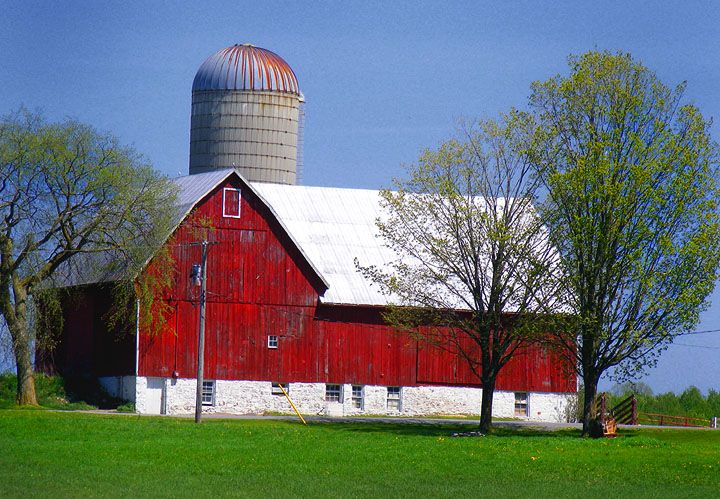
Rural scene, Peterborough County, near Lakefield, Ontario

- Peterborough, Ontario

=== Towns/Villages ===
- Buckhorn, Ontario
- Lakefield, Ontario
- Norwood, Ontario
- Havelock, Ontario
- Douro, Ontario
- Apsley, Ontario
- Millbrook, Ontario
- Bridgenorth, Ontario

== Media ==
In 1994, the Connection newspaper (previously known as Causeway Connection) established in Selwyn in central Peterborough County. The free monthly cottage country newspaper is distributed by mail, providing non-partisan news and information. The Connection is expanding both its distribution areas and internet presence.

== See also ==
- List of municipalities in Ontario
- List of townships in Ontario
- List of secondary schools in Ontario#Peterborough County
