= Gamiing Nature Centre =

- Founded: 1995; Lindsay, Ontario
- Founder: Mieke Schipper
- Type: Charitable organization
- Purpose: Environmentalism
- Location: Lindsay, Ontario
- Region served: Southern Ontario
- Method: Education, restoration, consultancy
- Key people: Volunteer Executive Director Mieke Schipper; Projects Manager John Nolan; Outdoor Education specialist Sandy Carrothers
- Volunteers: 10-15
- Website: http://gamiing.org/

Gamiing Nature Centre (pronounced gaa'-min-j) is a nature centre located on the western shore of Pigeon Lake, Ontario, Canada. Gamiing is a grassroots not-for-profit organization and is registered as a charitable organization within Canada. Gamiing was founded in 1995 by current volunteer executive director, Mieke Schipper. The word Gamiing is Ojibwa and translates into 'At the Shore' and was chosen by Gamiing to honour the land's first inhabitants and their lakeshore location. The 100 acre property is located in the City of Kawartha Lakes.

Gamiing's self-described mandate includes education and hands-on demonstrations of ecologically sound practices related to lakes and lakeshores. Gamiing works with individuals, community groups and other interested parties to further understanding of and participation in practices that balance human needs with the needs of wildlife and natural lake ecosystems. Gamiing operates in three primary areas: environmental education, lakeshore restoration, and they operate a fully stocked native plant nursery. The nursery sells plants native to Southern Ontario, within a 150 km radius of their location on Pigeon Lake.

In April 2009, the organization name was changed from 'Gamiing Centre for Sustainable Lakeshore Living' to 'Gamiing Nature Centre'.

Gamiing raises funds through various grants as well as by many successful events like their golf outing and Summer Lakeshore Music Festival. In September 2009, Gamiing hosted a 'Green Golf Tournament', one of the first of its kind in Canada. Gamiing also facilitates many career transitioning positions in the fields of parks and recreation, ecosystems management, and marketing for post-secondary youth.

The organization also dedicates itself to conserving wildlife along the shores of Pigeon Lake, and in association with the Trent Severn Waterway, Gamiing helped restore habitat for the threatened Blanding's turtle.

== Community Programs ==
Gamiing's Buckthorn Removal Project: Buckthorn is a highly invasive non-native shrub. It was introduced to Ontario in the early 1800s when farmers came from Scotland, Ireland and England to fence farms fields. Once established, it crowds out native species such as maple and oak. Gamiing worked with ten almost-graduates of the Eco System Management Technician Program of Fleming College as a work placement to help eradicate the non-native species.

== Website ==
- Gamiing Nature Centre
