= Kawartha Lakes (Ontario) =

Chain of lakes in Ontario, Canada

Coordinates: 44°29′57.84″N 78°26′27.60″W

The Kawartha Lakes (/kə'wɔrθɐ/) are a chain of lakes in south-central Ontario, Canada that form the upper watershed of the Trent River. The lakes are located on the boundary between the Paleozoic limestone regions of the Golden Horseshoe, and the Precambrian granite Canadian Shield of northern and central Ontario. The region is referred to as a cottage country due to its waterfront forested landscapes.

"Kawartha" is an anglicization of the word "Ka-wa-tha" (from "Ka-wa-tae-gum-maug" or Gaa-waategamaag), a word coined in 1895 by Anishinaabekwe Martha Whetung of the Curve Lake First Nations. It was hoped that the word, which meant "land of reflections" in the Anishinaabe language, would provide a convenient and popular advertising label for the area, much as "Muskoka" had come to describe the area and lakes north of Gravenhurst. The word was subsequently changed by tourism promoters to Kawartha, with the meaning "bright waters and happy lands."

Though the city of Kawartha Lakes is named for them, more than half of the Kawartha Lakes are in fact located in Peterborough County. The Trent-Severn Waterway makes its way through many lakes in the main chain; many cottages dot the lakes' shorelines some of which are quite large in size, and the region is most known for its recreational tourism.

== Primary chain ==
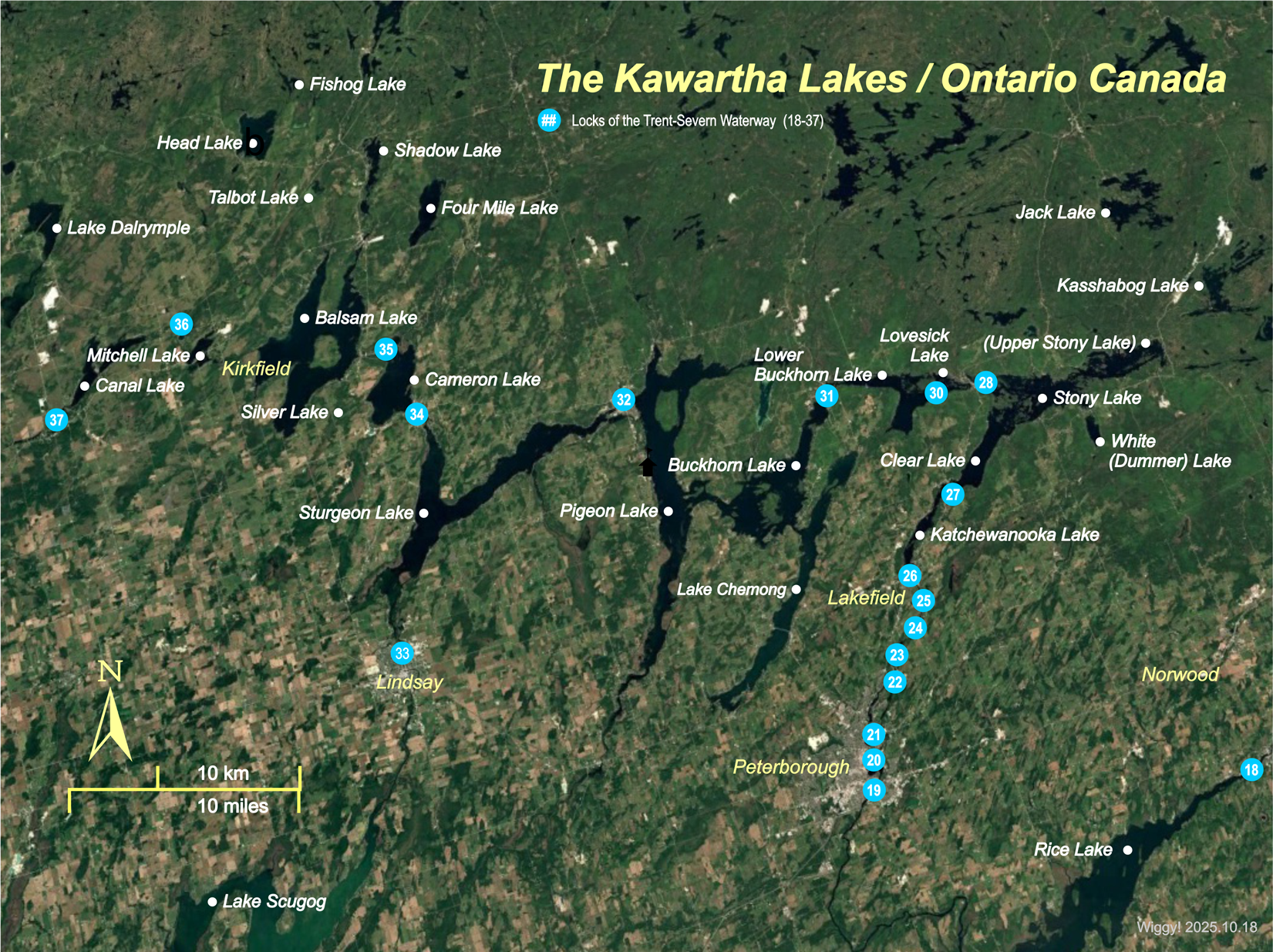
The Kawartha Lakes and the Trent Severn Waterway, Ontario, Canada

- Lakes on the Talbot River:
  - Canal Lake
  - Mitchell Lake
- Lakes on the Trent River:
  - Balsam Lake
  - Four Mile Lake
  - Cameron Lake
  - Sturgeon Lake
  - Pigeon Lake
  - Shadow Lake
  - Silver Lake
  - Talbot Lake
- Some additional lakes:
  - Buckhorn Lake
  - Lake Chemong
  - Lower Buckhorn Lake
  - Lovesick Lake
  - Stony Lake
  - Clear Lake
  - Katchewanooka Lake
  - Lake Scugog (to the southwest of the main chain of lakes)

Additional lakes:

- Lake Dalrymple
- Head Lake
- Fishog Lake
- White (Dummer) Lake
- Jack Lake
- Kasshabog Lake
- Rice Lake

== Kawartha Highlands ==
A system of interconnected lakes lies to the north of the main chain. Due to an artificial dam placed at the south end of Mississauga Lake in the mid-20th century, these lakes have equal levels and are inter-navigable. They consist of Catchacoma Lake, Beaver Lake, Mississauga Lake, Gold Lake, McGinnis Lake, Cold Lake, and Cavendish Lake.

Also nearby, but not reachable by boat without portage, are Gull Lake, Anstruther Lake, Bottle Lake, and Sucker Lake. The area is partially enclosed by Kawartha Highlands Provincial Park.

== Language demographics ==
1% of residents are francophones and 5% are fluent in French.

== See also ==
- List of lakes in Ontario
