= Mississagua Lake =

Lake in Ontario, Canada

- Location within Ontario
- Location: Ontario
- Coordinates: 44°42′20″N 78°19′15″W
- Basin countries: Canada
- Surface area: 590 ha (1,458 acres)
- Average depth: 18 m (58 ft)
- Max. depth: 40 m (130 ft)

Mississagua Lake is a lake in the Kawartha Highlands in Ontario, Canada. It borders the western section of the Kawartha Highlands Signature Site Park.

== Wildlife ==
Several species of fish are documented to be extant in the lake:

- Rock Bass
- Largemouth Bass
- Smallmouth Bass
- Lake Trout

== Human Presence ==
The area contains several privately owned cottages and over the last 5–10 years it has become a popular destination for several successful business owners/executives, as well as several professional ice hockey players in the NHL.

== See also ==
- List of lakes in Ontario
