= Anstruther Lake =

Lake in Peterborough County, Ontario, Canada

- Location of the lake in Southern Ontario
- Location: Peterborough County, Ontario
- Coordinates: 44°44′36″N 78°12′36″W
- Part of: Great Lakes Basin
- Primary inflows: Anstruther Creek, Camp Creek
- Primary outflows: Anstruther Creek
- Basin countries: Canada
- Surface elevation: 299 m (981 ft)
- Settlements: Anstruther Lake

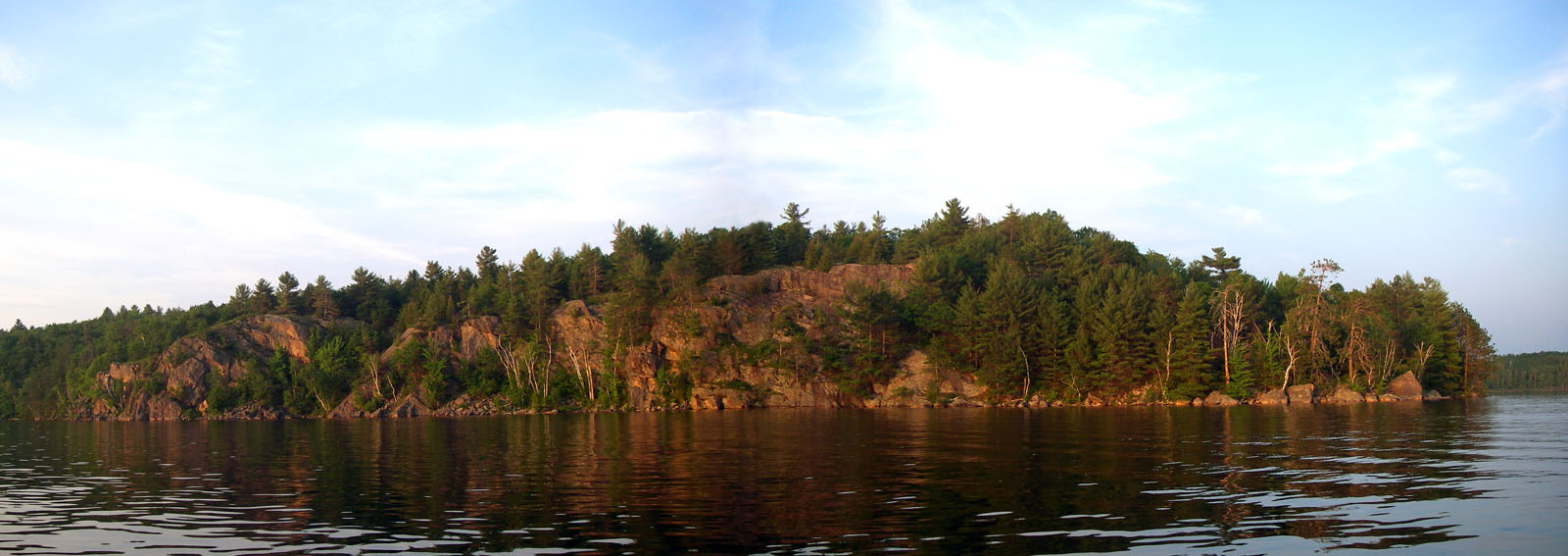

Anstruther Lake is a lake in the municipality of North Kawartha, Peterborough County in Central Ontario, Canada, between the community of Apsley on Ontario Highway 28 8.5 kilometres (5.3 mi) to the east and the community of Catchacoma on County Road 507 8.5 kilometres (5.3 mi) to the west. Kawartha Highlands Provincial Park encompasses the lake, and the community of Anstruther Lake is on the southern shore. The lake flows out via Anstruther Creek, and the Mississaugua, Otonabee and Trent rivers into Lake Ontario.

== Cottage life ==
Approximately 230 cottages have been built on the lake. 25 town houses were recently built at The Landing marina. Fishing is reportedly good, though not as good as the uninhabited lakes upstream. The Anstruther Lake Cottager's Association hosts an annual regatta (Civic Holiday) and corn roast (Labour Day). There is a marina is on the lake to provide gas, boat services and necessities.
