= Pigeon Lake (Ontario) =

Lake in southern Ontario, Canada

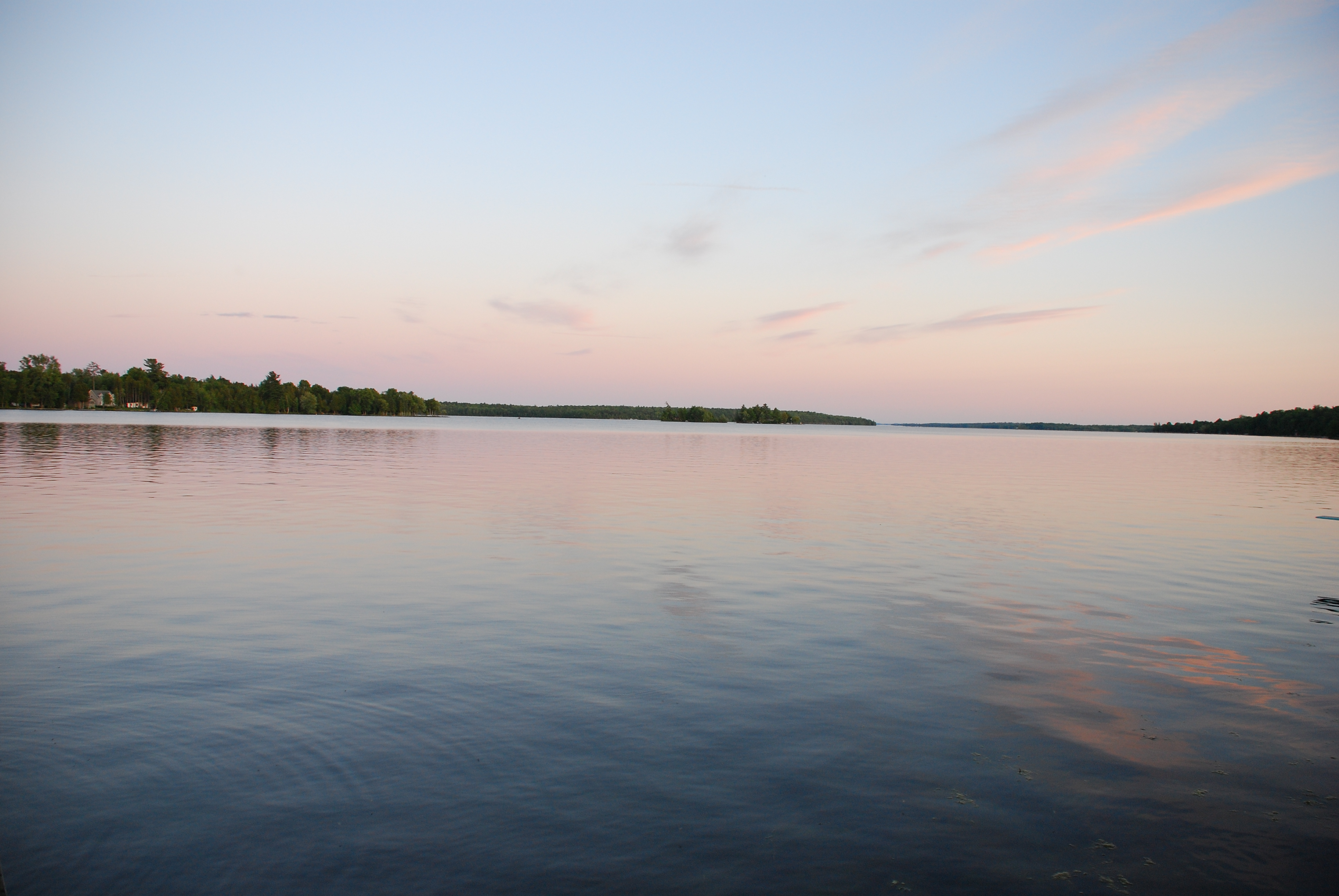
- Pigeon Lake at dusk

- Location of the lake in Southern Ontario

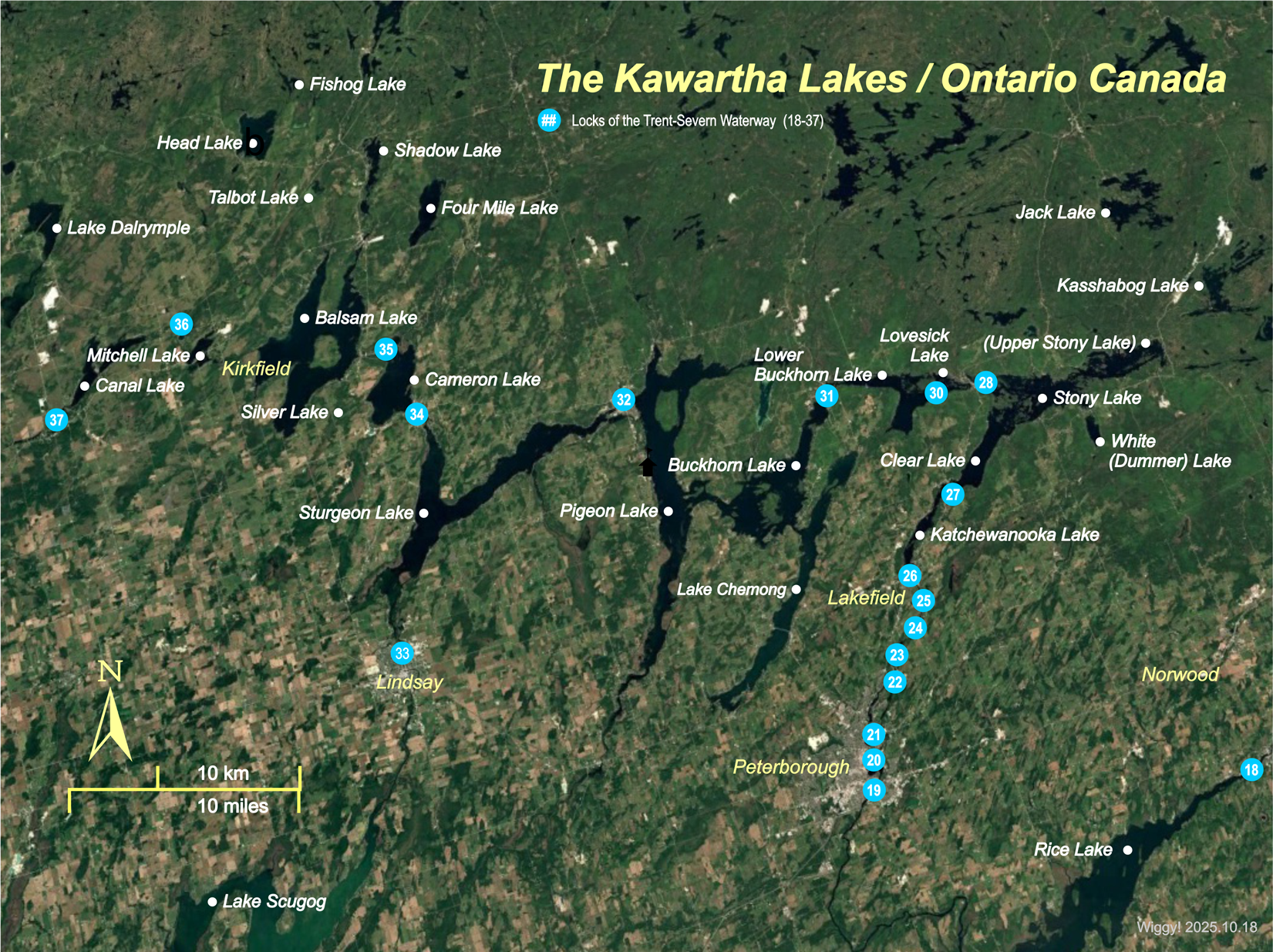
- The Kawartha Lakes and Trent-Severn Waterway; Pigeon Lake at centre
- Location: Central Ontario
- Group: Kawartha lakes
- Coordinates: 44°28′18″N 78°29′42″W
- Type: lake
- Primary inflows: Sturgeon Lake via the Big Bob Channel and Little Bob Channel at Bobcaygeon
- Primary outflows: Buckhorn Lake through the Gannon Narrows
- Max. length: 27 km (17 mi)
- Max. width: 3 km (1.9 mi)
- Surface area: 5,344 ha (13,210 acres)
- Max. depth: 17 m (56 ft)
- Surface elevation: 246 m (807 ft)
- Islands: Big Island; Jacob Island; White Island; Thorne Island; Grenadier Island; Paradise Island; Roetzel Island; Red Rock Island; Bottom Islands; Bruces Islands; Snake Island

Pigeon Lake is a lake in Central Ontario, Canada. It is one of a group of lakes called the Kawartha Lakes, which are the namesake of the city of Kawartha Lakes, and part of the Trent–Severn Waterway, thus in the Lake Ontario drainage basin. Pigeon Lake is 27 km long and up to 3 km wide.

== Geography ==
The west side and southern end of the lake is in the city of Kawartha Lakes. The northern and eastern end of the lake is in the municipality of Trent Lakes, and a small portion of the centre-east of the lake is in the municipality of Selwyn; both municipalities are part of Peterborough County.

=== Communities ===
Communities along and near the lakeshore include Bobcaygeon at the northwest, and Omemee at the south.

=== Tri-lake water system ===
Pigeon Lake is part of a tri-lake water system consisting of Pigeon Lake, Buckhorn Lake, and Chemong Lake.

== Nearby landmarks ==
The Gamiing Nature Centre operates on the west shore of Pigeon Lake from a 100-acre property with a natural shoreline, surrounded by wetlands, forests and meadows.

== Natural history ==
The most common game fish in the lake are smallmouth bass, largemouth bass, walleye, yellow perch, carp, muskellunge as well as a number of panfish. Commercial and recreational fishing has caused the introduction of zebra mussels, which change the ecosystem by filtering the water and making it clearer. Some fish, such as Walleye, dislike the clear water and have become less abundant.

== Recreation ==
The tri-lake area, of which Pigeon Lake is a part, is host to several popular fishing tournaments throughout the open fishing season.

== See also ==
- List of lakes in Ontario
