= Trent Lakes =

- Municipality (lower-tier)
- Municipality of Trent Lakes
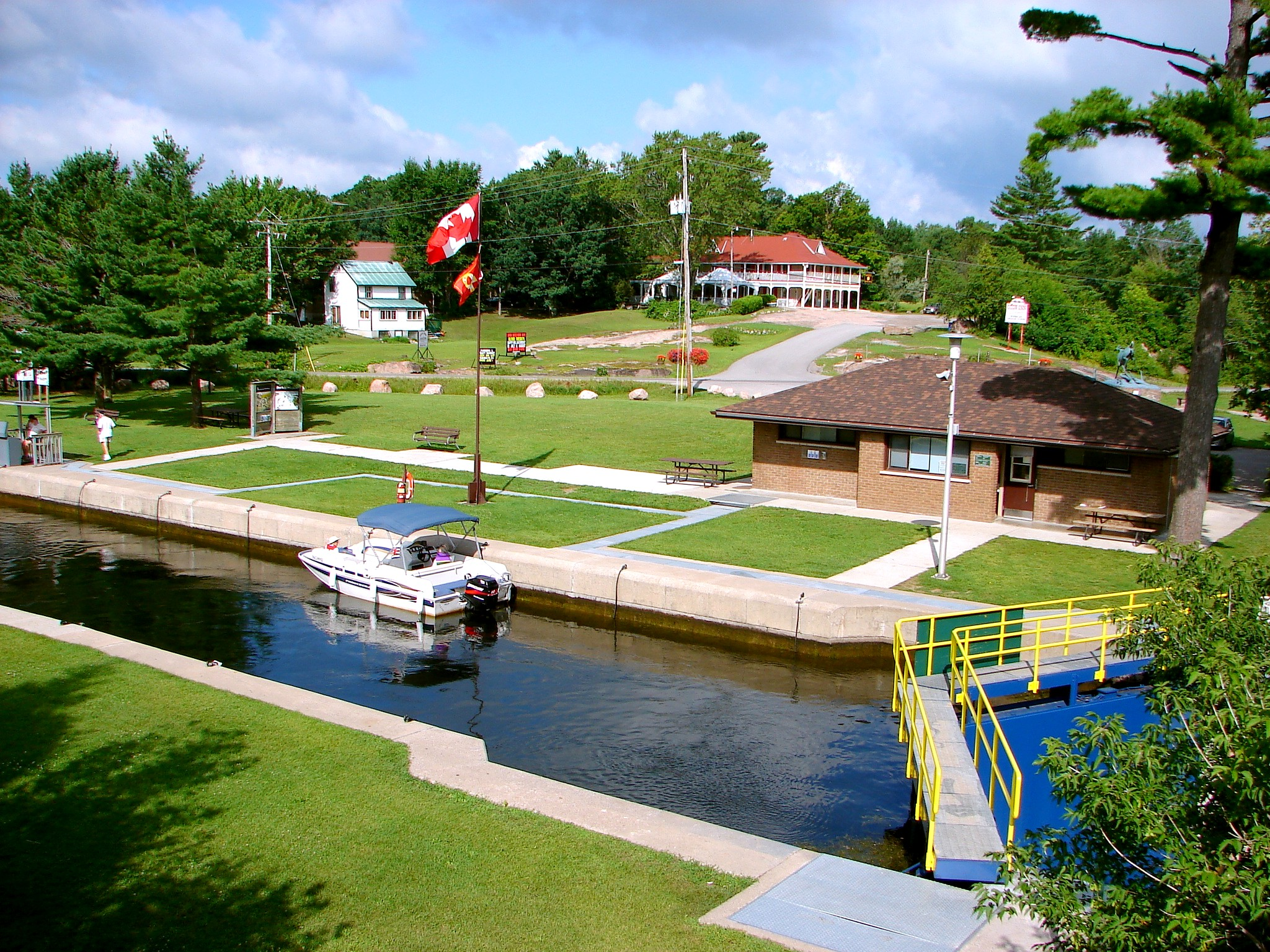
- Trent-Severn Waterway Lock 31 in Buckhorn

- Location within Peterborough County Location within Southern Ontario
- Coordinates: 44°40′N 78°26′W
- Country: Canada
- Province: Ontario
- County: Peterborough
- Incorporated: January 1, 1998

Government
  - Type: Township
  - Mayor: Terry Lambshead
  - Federal riding: Haliburton—Kawartha Lakes; Peterborough
  - Prov. riding: Peterborough—Kawartha

Area
  - Land: 833.72 km^{2} (321.90 sq mi)

Population (2021)
  - Total: 6,439
  - Density: 7.7/km^{2} (20/sq mi)
- Time zone: UTC-5 (EST)
  - Summer (DST): UTC-4 (EDT)
- Postal Code: K0L, K0M
- Area code: 705
- Website: www.trentlakes.ca

The Municipality of Trent Lakes is a lower-tier township in the rural, mostly wooded northern section of Peterborough County, Ontario, Canada. The municipality has a primarily cottage and tourist industry based economy but has grown year round residency due to its commute distance to the Greater Toronto Area.

In 1998 the Township of Galway-Cavendish and the Township of Harvey were amalgamated by Minister's Order to become Galway-Cavendish and Harvey. The Municipality of Trent Lakes adopted its new name by By-law B2013-017 on February 19, 2013. The name was in recognition of the Trent-Severn Waterway which plays a major role in the cottage history and tourism economy of the area. The Municipality is part of the Kawartha Lakes Tourism Area and contains numerous tributary lakes, rivers and creeks contributing water level support to the nationally historic Trent-Severn Waterway system. Lock 31 in Buckhorn is the only Trent-Severn Waterway boat lock located within the municipality.

== Geography ==
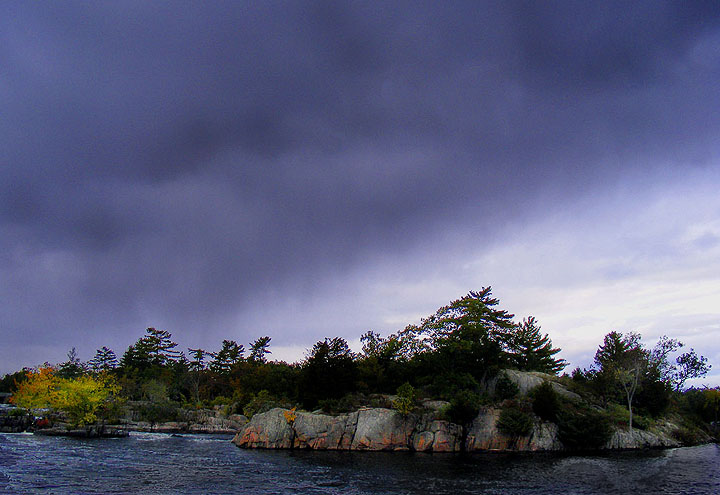
Burleigh Falls in the rain located in North Kawartha but near Trent Lakes

Trent Lakes is home to Kawartha Highlands Provincial Park, which is set around Catchacoma Lake and Mississagua Lake. A 37,587-hectare (92,880-acre) Natural Environment Park permitting "backcountry" camping and primarily a water access only interior. Three violent summer wind storms have hit this area doing damage to property and forest, one in 1927, then 1995 and in 2006. The area is also a popular cottaging and recreational area.

Trent Lakes consists mostly of Precambrian Shield, dating from 600 to 1,200 million years. The granite is normally pink but interlaced with other colours of white and black as one heads north. These areas are primarily "igneous" granite which was subject to intense heat and pressure during the movement of the Earth's crust. The changes took place as the rock mixed with other elements in the Earth's crust. The mixture is mostly with black and white marble. The region also has sections of limestone flats. When the lakes that covered most of Lake Ontario dried up some 450 million years ago the lake sediments hardened and lifted to form a top layer of limestone over the area. With the ice age small glaciers left a thin layer of soil. The area around what is known as Flynn's Turn (intersection of Peterborough County Road 36 and Country Road 507) is a prime example of a limestone flat.

On Highway 49 you can see the evidence of what is called a limestone ridge ("Ordovician strata"). This same ridge extends to Lower Buckhorn Lake and the erosion on the northern edge has created a scarp (or steep cliff) some 30 metres (98 ft) high in areas.

Sandy Lake and the beach area have soft turquoise colour. This is a white "marl" lake bottom and is spring fed. Surrounded by a limestone karst runoff enters into the lake with very little organic material and this contributes to the greenish-blue colouration. The marl bottom is soft and rich with minerals.

The community is a scenic location where Paleozoic limestone formations yield to the underlying Precambrian bedrock of pink gneiss; as a result, it attracts a large number of summer residents and visitors.

=== Communities ===
Trent Lakes identifies three wards within the municipality; Harvey Ward, Galway Ward and Cavendish Ward. The three wards are based on traditional geographic boundaries and for election purposes there is still Municipal Council representatives for Harvey and Galway-Cavendish. This was a result of the 1998 amalgamation of the townships of Galway-Cavendish and Harvey.

The municipality has many community subdivisions concentrated around the many lakes. Several of the communities were originally intended for cottage use but today many of the subdivisions contain year round residents. There are two municipally owned drinking water supply systems. One in the Buckhorn Lakes Estates subdivision and the other servicing the Pirates Glen and Alpine Village subdivisions. Other residences must rely on private wells.

The hamlet of Buckhorn is situated on the border of the Municipality of Trent Lakes and the Township of Selwyn. The main downtown core is situated on the Trent Lakes side. A span of two bridges connect the hamlet. One bridge spans Trent-Severn Waterway Lock 31 on the Trent Lakes side. The second span is over the Buckhorn dam on the Township of Selwyn side.

There is one public school in the municipality of Trent Lakes. It is the Buckhorn Public School. Being a rural municipality all other children are bused to local schools outside of the municipality, being serviced by the Kawartha Pine Ridge District (Public) School Board and the Peterborough Victoria Northumberland & Clarington Catholic School Board.

There are three municipal Community Centres in Trent Lakes; the Galway Community Centre, the Cavendish Community Centre, and Lakehurst Hall. They offer a variety of programs and services. There is also the independently operated and volunteer based Buckhorn Community Centre.

The Trent Lakes Public Library has two locations. The Buckhorn Branch is located in the main core of Buckhorn. The Helen Bowen Branch is located in the Cavendish Community Centre and often referred to simply as the Cavendish Branch.

Trent Lakes currently has two medical health centres, the Buckhorn Regional Health Centre and the Kinmount and District Health Centre.

The border of the Municipality of Trent Lakes is Gannons Narrows in the southeast, Buckhorn on the east (shared with Selwyn Township) and almost to Burleigh Falls in the northeast (includes Perry's Creek). The rapids and falls at Burleigh Falls are often thought to be in Trent Lakes but this is a mistake. The Burleigh Falls Inn and island are actually in the Township of North Kawartha and the dam, rapids and falls are in the Township of Selwyn.

Kinmount is in the far northwest tip of Trent Lakes. The village is apportioned by the three municipalities of City of Kawartha Lakes, Minden Hills and Trent Lakes. The Kinmount Fairgrounds is the site of the Kinmount Fair under the care and ownership of the Kinmount Agricultural Society. The fair is held the Labour Day weekend and heavily attended. The fair celebrated its 150th edition in 2020.

Trent Lakes is also connected to the Township of Selwyn by a causeway and span of bridge at Gannon Narrows. The bridge spans the actual narrows connecting (Upper) Buckhorn Lake with Pigeon Lake.

Current and some historic communities are Alpine Village, Buckhorn, Buckhorn Lake Estates, Catchacoma, Crystal Lake, Ewan, Flynns, Fortescue, Kawartha Hideaway, Lakehurst, Mississagua Landing, Mount Irwin, Nogies Creek, Oak Shores Estates, Pirates Glen, Point Pleasant, Rockcroft and Sugar Bush and the area has numerous cottager and ratepayer associations.

== History ==
The lumber and agricultural industries are significant to the history of the township. Due to the topography of the region, agricultural production was limited to only certain areas where soil conditions were adequate and cattle and mixed farming (orchards, cattle, horses, sheep, grains, vegetables, chickens and turkeys) were the predominant formats. Lumber production in the area led to the construction of standing timber lumber camps, with the numerous waterways allowing the transport of that lumber to production and processing mills in the area. This led to the development of settlements of forestry workers, but non-resident lumber barons took most of the gains from the industry. With the decline of the lumber industry, the settlements in the region also grew less populous. The French Canadians, Irish immigrants and other lumber labourers moved to other thriving locations, leaving smaller groups in the region. Galway, Cavendish and Harvey wards all have ghost settlements and nearly-forgotten communities including Silver Lake, Rockcroft, Scotts Mills, Fortesque. Following World War II, the area became popular as a camping and cottaging area.

The area is rich in early First Nations sites, and many First Nations members live in the community year-round or seasonally on some of the islands in Lovesick Lake.

The old Harvey fire tower was located at the southern edge of Mississagua Lake (then known as Gull Lake). It was one of the 320 towers in the province used as an early warning in the detection of forest fires. Part of the Lindsay Forest District of towers this tower had its own phone line connection back to headquarters. The phone line still runs through the forest and up the hill to the old towers footings. In 1927 the Harvey tower was made of wood, but a hurricane came through and blew it over. Parts of the tower were found miles away. A newer wood tower was built in its place, that is, until 1938 when a light steel tower had been erected. The tower system was abandoned by 1970 when aerial detection became favoured and the tower dismantled.

Initially, the municipality of Trent Lakes was made up of two townships, the township of Galway-Cavendish and the township of Harvey. In 1998, the provincial government of Ontario planned for a reduction in the number of municipal governments throughout the province. The two townships, located in the same corner of Peterborough County, had much in common economically, topographically, and historically and agreed to amalgamate. They became the Township of Galway-Cavendish and Harvey, recognising the composite parts of the new municipality. However, on February 19, 2013, the township changed its name again, this time to its current name, recognising the role of the tourist and cottage industry of the Trent Severn Waterway system.

== Demographics ==
In the 2021 Census of Population conducted by Statistics Canada, Trent Lakes had a population of 6,439 living in 2,952 of its 5,750 total private dwellings, a change of 19.3% from its 2016 population of 5,397. With a land area of 833.72 km^{2} (321.90 sq mi), it had a population density of 7.7/km^{2} (20.0/sq mi) in 2021.

Canada census – Trent Lakes community profile

	2021	2016	2011
Population	6,439 (+19.3% from 2016)	5,397 (+5.8% from 2011)	5,105 (-3.4% from 2006)
Land area	833.72 km^{2} (321.90 sq mi)	861.32 km^{2} (332.56 sq mi)	860.26 km^{2} (332.15 sq mi)
Population density	7.7/km^{2} (20/sq mi)	6.3/km^{2} (16/sq mi)	5.9/km^{2} (15/sq mi)
Median age	58.0 (M: 58.0, F: 57.6)	56.9 (M: 56.9, F: 57.0)
Private dwellings	5,750 (total) 2,952 (occupied)	5,643 (total) 2,449 (occupied)	5,287 (total)
Median household income	$85,000	$68,498

References: 2021 2016 2011

Historical census populations – Trent Lakes

Year	Pop.	±%
1996	4,400	—
2001	4,372	−0.6%
2006	5,284	+20.9%

Year	Pop.	±%
2011	5,105	−3.4%
2016	5,397	+5.7%
2021	6,439	+19.3%

Population counts are not adjusted for boundary changes.
Source: Statistics Canada

Mother tongue (2021):

- English as first language: 92.8%
- French as first language: 0.9%
- English and French as first language: 0.2%
- Other as first language: 5.4%

== Government ==
Trent Lakes is led by a mayor, deputy mayor and three councillors. The current council was elected in 2022 and will serve a four-year term to 2026. They are:

- Mayor: Terry Lambshead
- Deputy Mayor: Carol Armstrong
- Councillors: Joe Cadigan (Galway-Cavendish Ward), John Braybrook (Harvey Ward), Peter Franzen (Councillor at Large)

The Mayor and Deputy Mayor represent Trent Lakes at meetings of Peterborough County Council.

== Recreation ==
Boaters use the Trent–Severn Waterway Lock 31, located in the hamlet of Buckhorn. The lock is situated between Lower Buckhorn Lake and Upper Buckhorn and is one of the busiest locks on the Waterway system.

Wolf Island Provincial Park is a 222-hectare (550-acre) water access only park established in 1985. The largest portion of the park is Wolf Island, an island located between Lower Buckhorn and Lovesick lakes. This is a 'non-operating' park with no facilities. You must carry-in and carry-out all items.

The area is also known for the 37,587-hectare (92,880-acre) Kawartha Highlands Provincial Park established in 1989. The park has a number of canoe routes, backcountry camping and trails. The park is the second largest in southern Ontario. The park has limited facilities, including limited parking.

John Earle Chase Memorial Park is a 160-hectare (400-acre) park located in the vicinity of Gannons Narrows on the shore of Pigeon Lake and offers day use only trails. There are no facilities at this free park and you must carry-in and carry-out all items. The land for the park was donated in 1995 to Trent-Severn Waterway, Parks Canada, in 1995 by the Chase family, which had farmed the area for several generations.

== See also ==
- List of townships in Ontario
