= Lower Buckhorn Lake =

Lake in Ontario, Canada

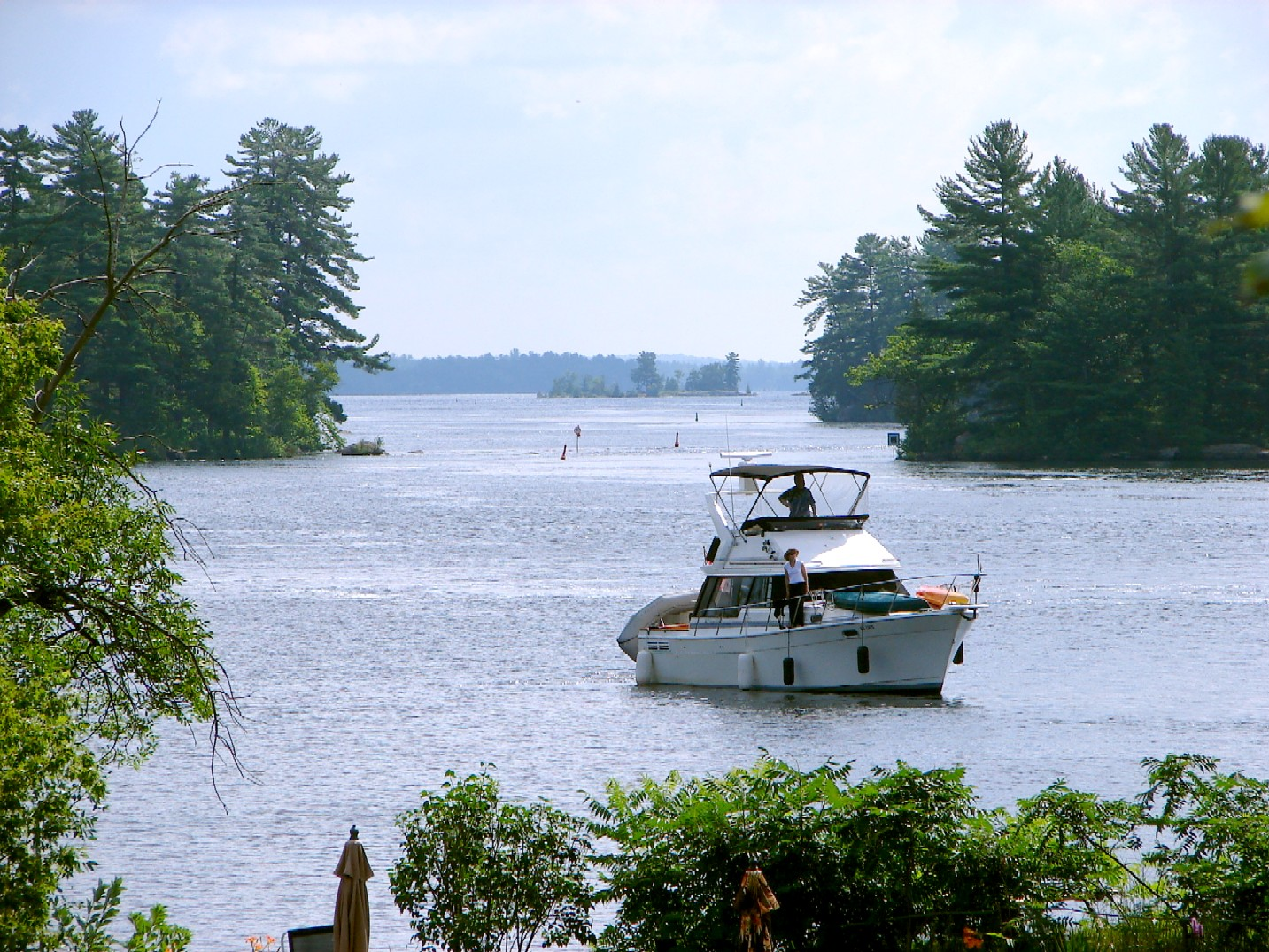
- A small inlet on Lower Buckhorn Lake.

- Location within Ontario

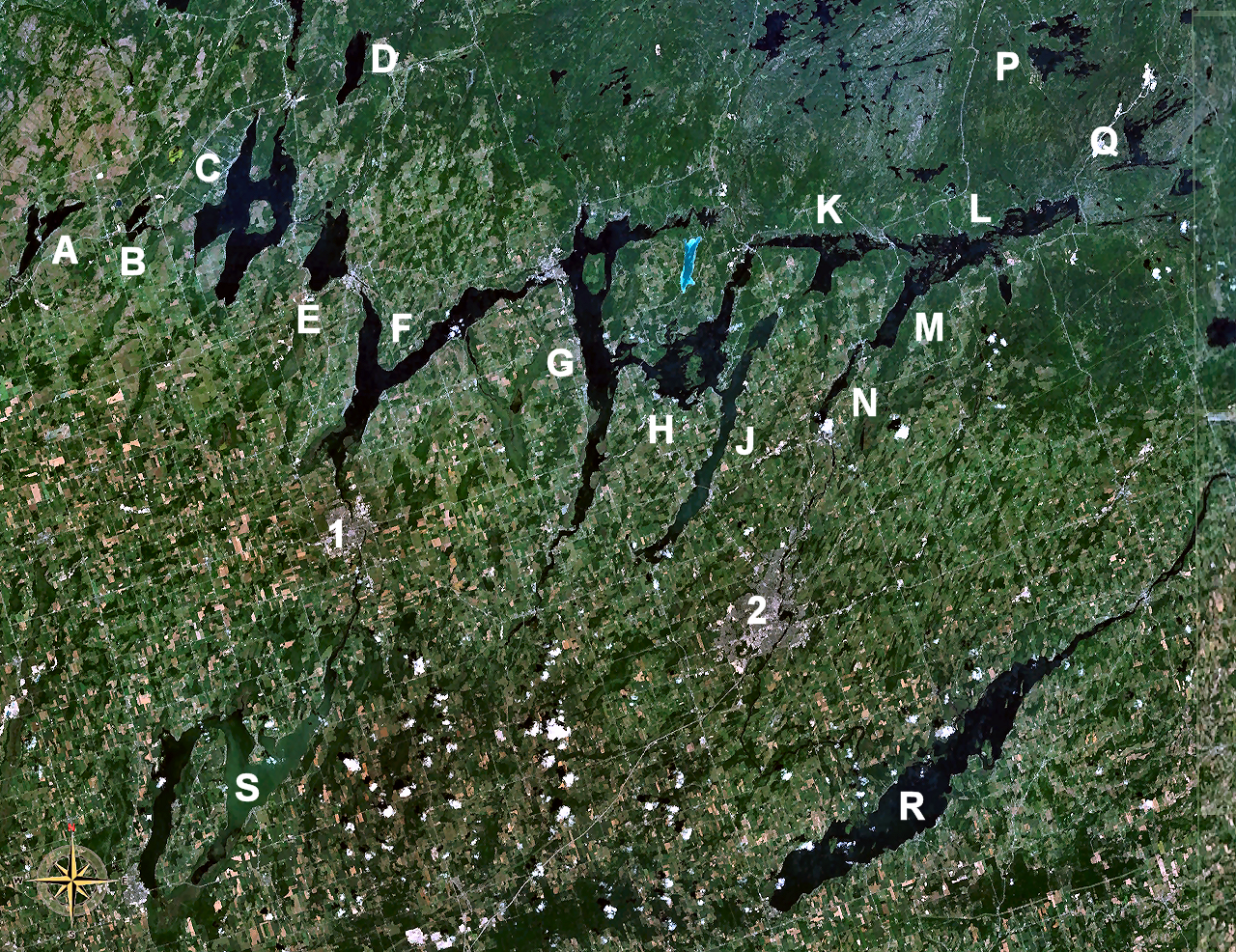
- Lower Buckhorn Lake (K) and the other Kawartha Lakes.
- Location: Ontario
- Group: Kawartha Lakes
- Coordinates: 44°33′00″N 78°15′30″W
- Primary inflows: Buckhorn Lake
- Primary outflows: Stony Lake
- Basin countries: Canada
- Settlements: Selwyn, Trent Lakes

Lower Buckhorn Lake is a lake located within the townships of Selwyn and Trent Lakes in Peterborough County, Ontario, Canada and is one of the Kawartha Lakes. Numerous small islands are located within the lake while the southern area is dominated by a large bay known as Deer Bay. Lock 31 (Buckhorn) of the Trent Severn Waterway links Lower Buckhorn Lake to Buckhorn Lake.

Lovesick Lake is the eastern end of Lower Buckhorn and is separated from it by Grey Duck Island, Wolf Island and Millage Island. Lock 30 (Lovesick) of the Trent Severn Waterway transits between Wolf and Millage Islands. Wolf Island Provincial Park includes Grey Duck and Wolf Islands and a portion of the mainland north of the lake.

== See also ==
- List of lakes in Ontario
