= Buckhorn Lake (Ontario) =

Lake in Peterborough County, Ontario, Canada

- Location in Southern Ontario
- Location: Peterborough County, Ontario
- Coordinates: 44°29′08″N 78°23′28″W
- Part of: Great Lakes Basin
- Primary inflows: Gannon's Narrows, Harrington Narrows
- Primary outflows: Lower Buckhorn Lake
- Basin countries: Canada
- Max. length: 14 kilometres (8.7 mi)
- Max. width: 7 kilometres (4.3 mi)
- Surface elevation: 245 metres (804 ft)

Buckhorn Lake is a lake in the townships of Trent Lakes and Selwyn in Peterborough County, Ontario, Canada, and is one of the Kawartha lakes.

The primary inflow is from Pigeon Lake through the Gannon Narrows at the west. Secondary inflows are from Chemong Lake through the Harrington Narrows to Harrington Bay at the south, and from Sandy Lake via Sandy Creek to Sandy Creek Bay at the south. A dam and lock 31 of the Trent–Severn Waterway at the community of Buckhorn control the outflow of the lake to Lower Buckhorn Lake at the northeast.

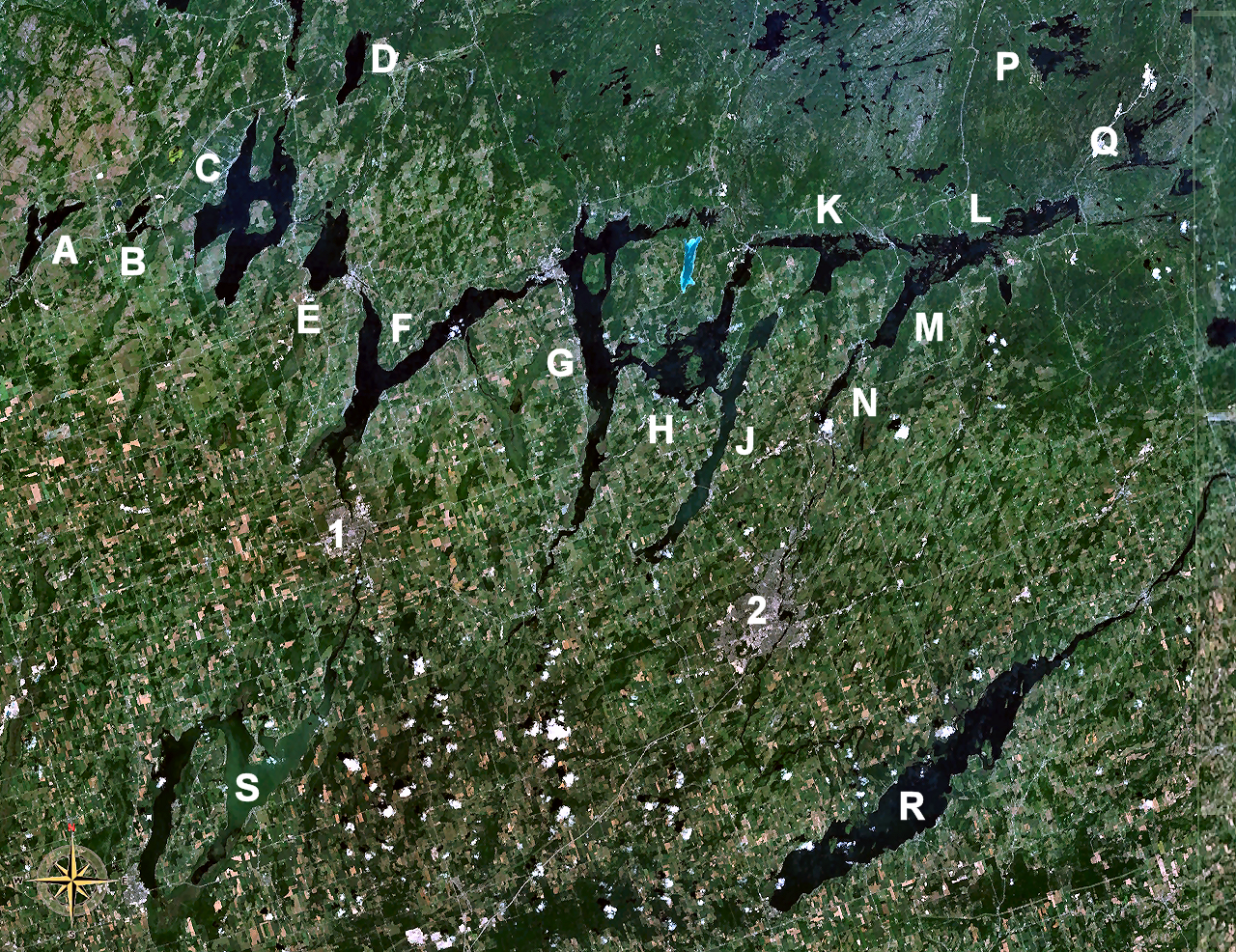
The Kawartha lakes; Buckhorn is H. Click on image for full legend.

It appears that the lake acquired its name as a consequence of its shape, appearing similar in shape to a buck's head with antlers or horns projecting either side, being Pigeon and Chemong Lakes. Buckhorn is also a small town surrounded by the lake. There are a few restaurants in the Buckhorn region and many summer cottages.

Settlements on the lake include Buckhorn, the Curve Lake First Nation, Gannon Village, Gannon Beach, Kawartha Hideaway, Kimberley Park, Oak Orchard and Young's Cove.
