= Kirkfield Lift Lock =

Boat lift in Ontario, Canada

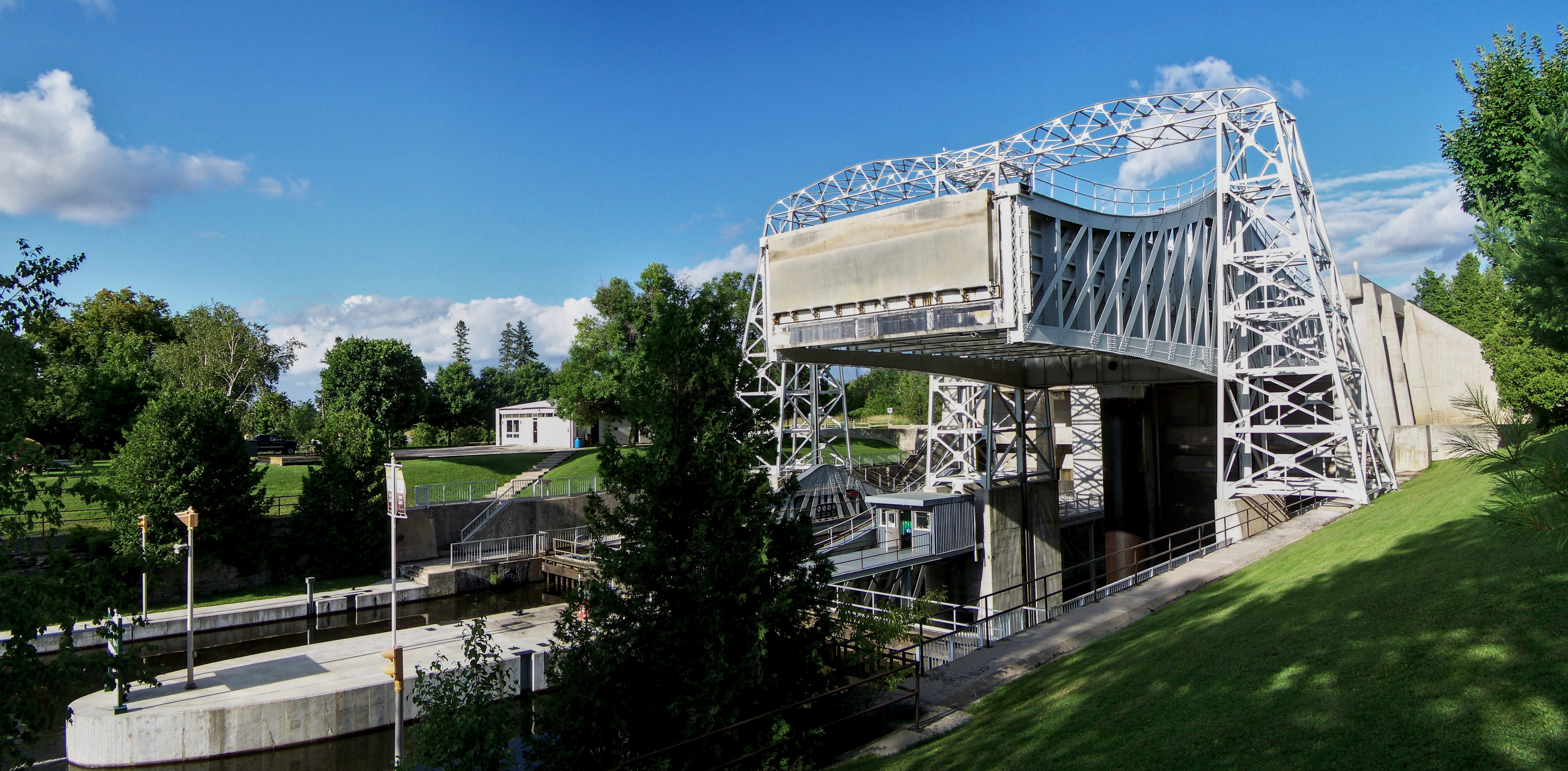
- Interactive map of Kirkfield Lift Lock
- 44.58973°N 78.98981°W
- Waterway: Trent-Severn Waterway
- Country: Canada
- Maintained by: Parks Canada
- Operation: Hydraulic
- First built: 1907
- Latest built: 1969
- Length: 42.4 m
- Width: 10.1 m
- Fall: 14.9 m
- Above sea level: 256.2 m

The Kirkfield Lift Lock is a boat lift located in the city of Kawartha Lakes, Ontario, Canada, near the village of Kirkfield. It is designated "Lock 36" of the Trent–Severn Waterway, situated at the highest section of the canal (256.2 m). It is Canada's second lift lock, the other one is the Peterborough Lift Lock, located on the same canal system.

== Construction history ==
=== The early years ===
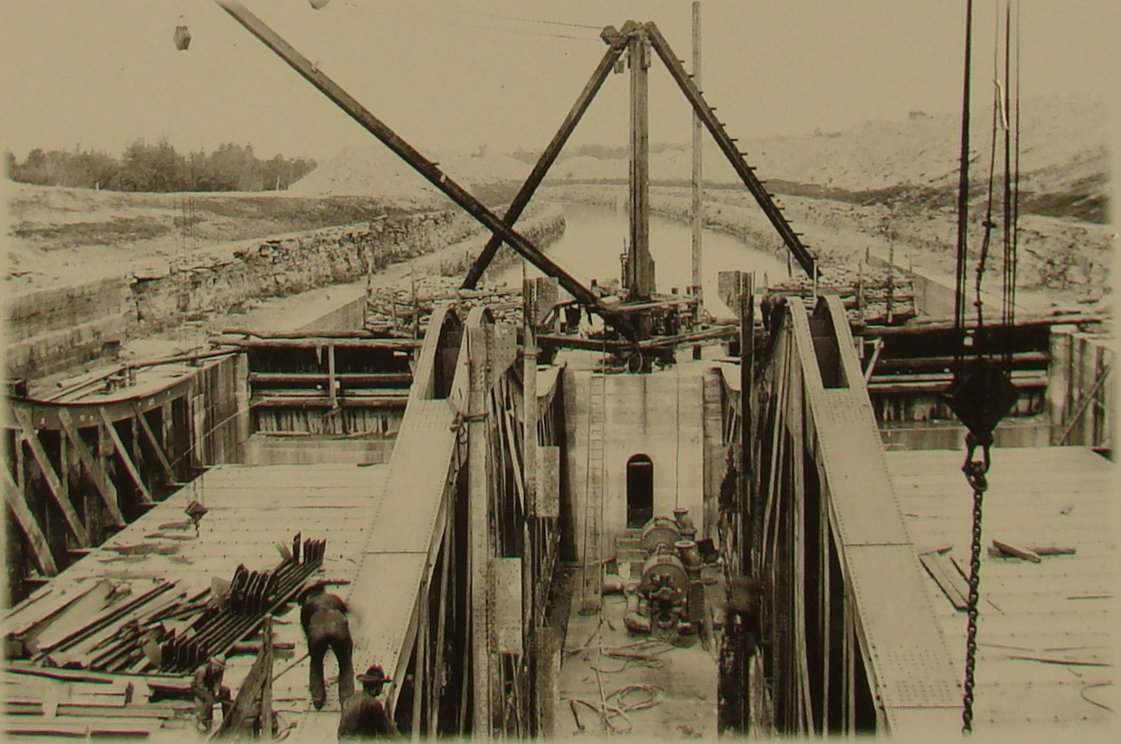
Construction of the Kirkfield Lift Lock during the 1900s

Construction of the lock took place between 1900 and 1907. It was contrived by Richard Birdsall Rogers, a Canadian engineer, who adopted the design of the Lifts on the old Canal du Centre in Belgium. The concept of the hydraulic lift lock had never been implemented in the harsher Canadian climate prior to the construction of the Peterborough Lift Lock, also designed by Rogers. The successful completion of the locks was therefore considered a significant technological breakthrough.

=== Modernization ===
During the late 1960s, the Kirkfield Lift Lock underwent a series of renovations. The original manual controls were electrified and automated, enabling all lock operations to be activated from a single console in the new control tower. The water-driven gate engines and pumps were removed, as well as the retaining walls, concrete piers, and the steel aqueduct. The shops and lockmaster's houses built along the canal were also demolished. The lock was reinforced with a massive concrete structure; a new two-lane underpass was constructed underneath.

View of Kawartha Lakes Road 6 (formerly Highway 503 travelling beneath the locks)

Currently, the lock is used exclusively by pleasure boats, like the rest of the canal, becoming obsolete for commercial traffic after the present version of the Welland Canal was completed in 1932.

=== Accident and Repair ===
On September 2nd, 2022, water suddenly began pouring out from the lock's northern caisson. Passengers aboard the Kawartha Voyageur, which was being raised up at the time, evacuated as the damaged lock was lowered back down. Unbeknownst to the passengers and witnesses to the event, the lock had suffered a mechanical failure. The lock was shut down and the site closed to the public as authorities investigated the incident.

On January 20th, 2023, Parks Canada announced that a contract was awarded in order to make repairs. By the start of navigation season on May 19th that same year, the lock was re-opened with "equipment and procedures for short-term, expedited single-tub operations" as repair work continued through the summer.
