= Catchacoma Lake =

Lake in Ontario, Canada

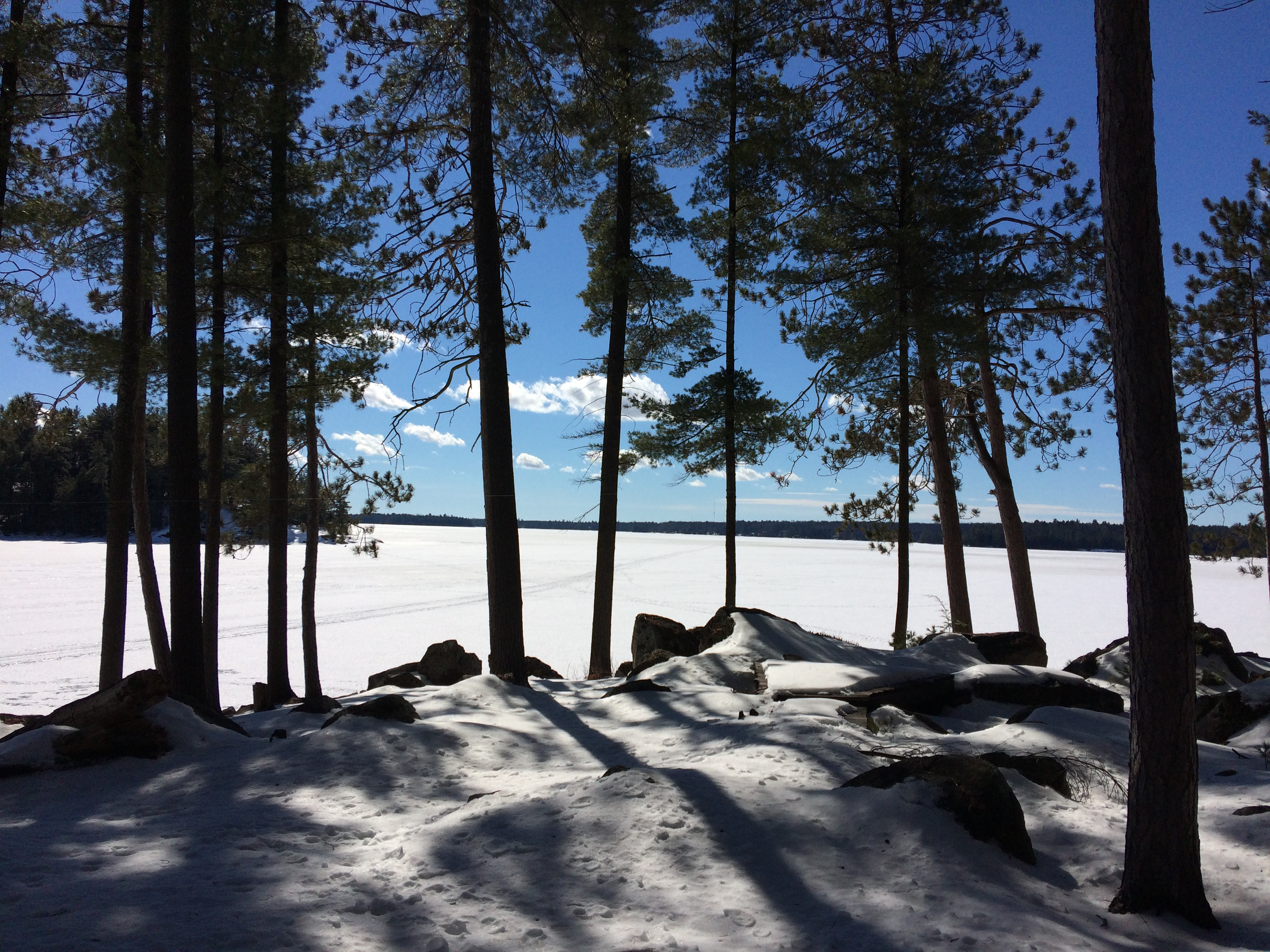

- Location within Ontario
- Location: Peterborough County, Ontario
- Coordinates: 44.75°N 78.327°W
- Basin countries: Canada
- Surface area: 1,699 acres (688 ha)
- Average depth: 66 ft (20 m)
- Max. depth: 144 ft (44 m)

Catchacoma Lake is a lake located in the Kawartha Highlands of Ontario, Canada.

== See also ==
- List of lakes in Ontario
