= Kawartha Highlands Provincial Park =

Provincial park in Ontario, Canada

- IUCN category II (national park)
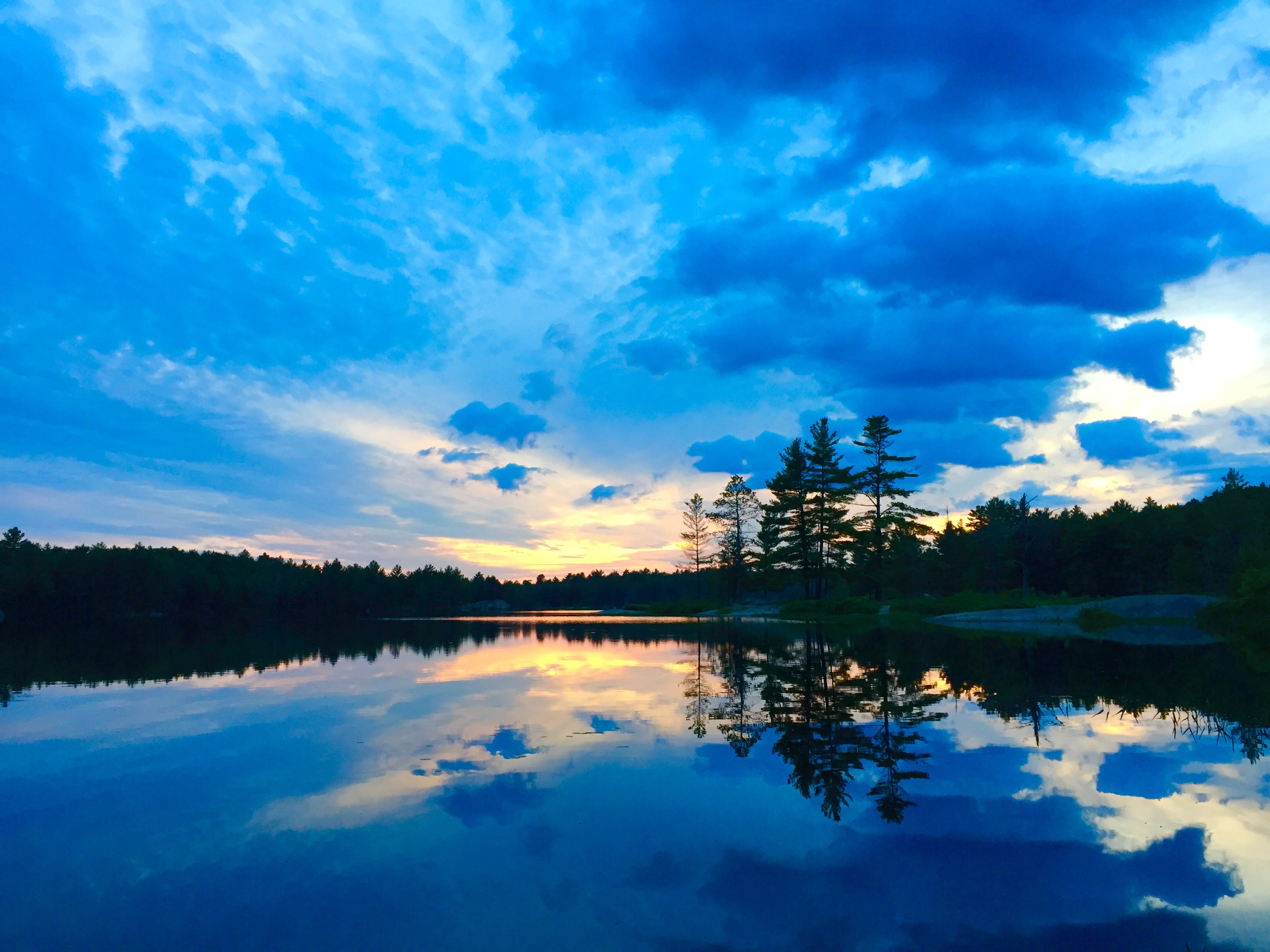
- Copper Lake in Kawartha Highlands Provincial Park

- Location within Southern Ontario Location within Ontario
- Interactive map of Kawartha Highlands Provincial Park
- Location: Ontario, Canada
- Nearest city: Peterborough, Ontario
- Coordinates: 44°45′N 78°15′W
- Area: 375.87 km^{2} (145.12 sq mi)
- Established: 1989, expanded in 2003
- Visitors: 26,127 (in 2022)
- Governing body: Ontario Parks
- Website: www.ontarioparks.ca/park/kawarthahighlands

Kawartha Highlands Provincial Park (officially Kawartha Highlands Signature Site) is a 375-square-kilometre (145 sq mi) area of preserved wilderness and recreational areas in south-central Ontario, Canada. It is located to the north and east of the main belt of the Kawartha Lakes, primarily in the township of North Kawartha. It is the largest single area of preserved land in the southern part of the province (excluding Algonquin Park, parts of which are in northern and southern Ontario).

== Geography ==
The park was expanded from its original size of 18.6 square kilometres (7.2 sq mi) to its current size in June 2003. It was previously a mostly wilderness tract enclosing Bottle Lake and Sucker Lake, and accessible primarily by canoe, many by portage routes only. It now encloses many more small lakes as well as all of Anstruther Lake, and has many cottages and access roads.

Municipally, the park is completely within Peterborough County: about two-thirds of its area is in the township of North Kawartha, and the remaining western portion is in the township of Trent Lakes. The park office is located offsite in Bancroft, Ontario, and co-located with the Ontario Ministry of Natural Resources.

== Recreation ==
The park officially became operational in May 2011 and ministry permits for camping and parking are now required. Campsites are designated and provided with picnic tables, fire rings and thunder boxes. Official Ontario Parks maps indicate the park boundaries and exclude small tracts of land which contain pre-existing cottages. Additionally, some cottages on Serpentine and Copper Lakes remain without owning land and continue to use motor boats.
