= North Kawartha =

Township in Ontario, Canada

- Township (lower-tier)
- Township of North Kawartha
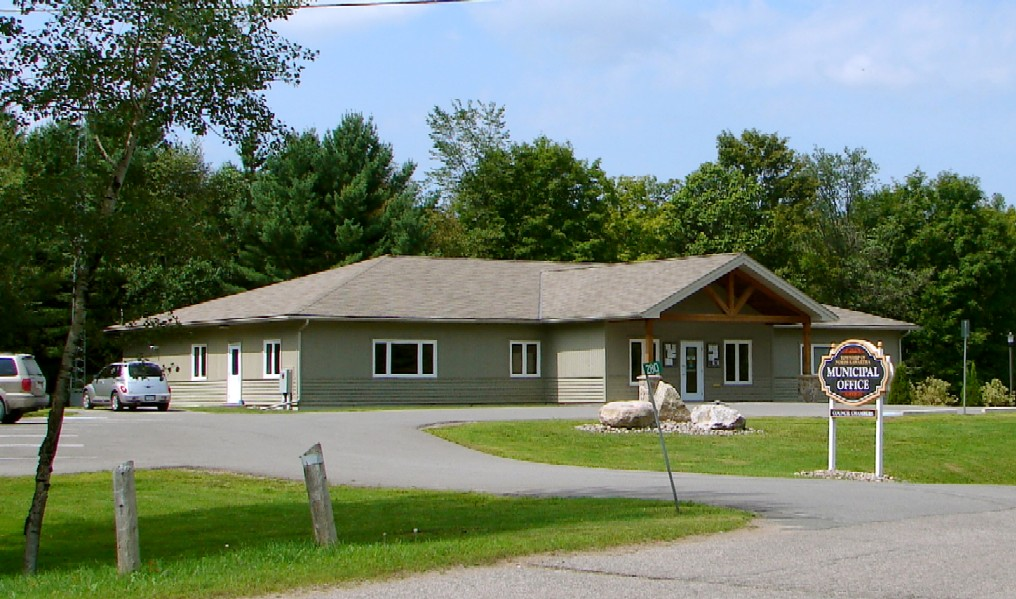
- Municipal office in Apsley

- Location within Peterborough County Location within Southern Ontario
- Coordinates: 44°45′N 78°06′W
- Country: Canada
- Province: Ontario
- County: Peterborough
- Incorporated: January 1, 1998

Government
  - Type: Township
  - Mayor: Carolyn Amyotte
  - Fed. riding: Haliburton—Kawartha Lakes
  - Prov. riding: Peterborough—Kawartha

Area
  - Land: 746.35 km^{2} (288.17 sq mi)

Population (2021)
  - Total: 2,877
  - Density: 3.9/km^{2} (10/sq mi)
- Time zone: UTC-5 (EST)
  - Summer (DST): UTC-4 (EDT)
- Postal Code: K0L 1A0
- Area code(s): 705 & 249 & 683
- Website: www.northkawartha.ca

North Kawartha is a township in northern Peterborough County, Ontario, Canada.

North Kawartha was formed on January 1, 1998, through an amalgamation of the Townships of Burleigh and Anstruther and the Township of Chandos. Until December 1999, it was known as Burleigh-Anstruther-Chandos.

== Communities ==
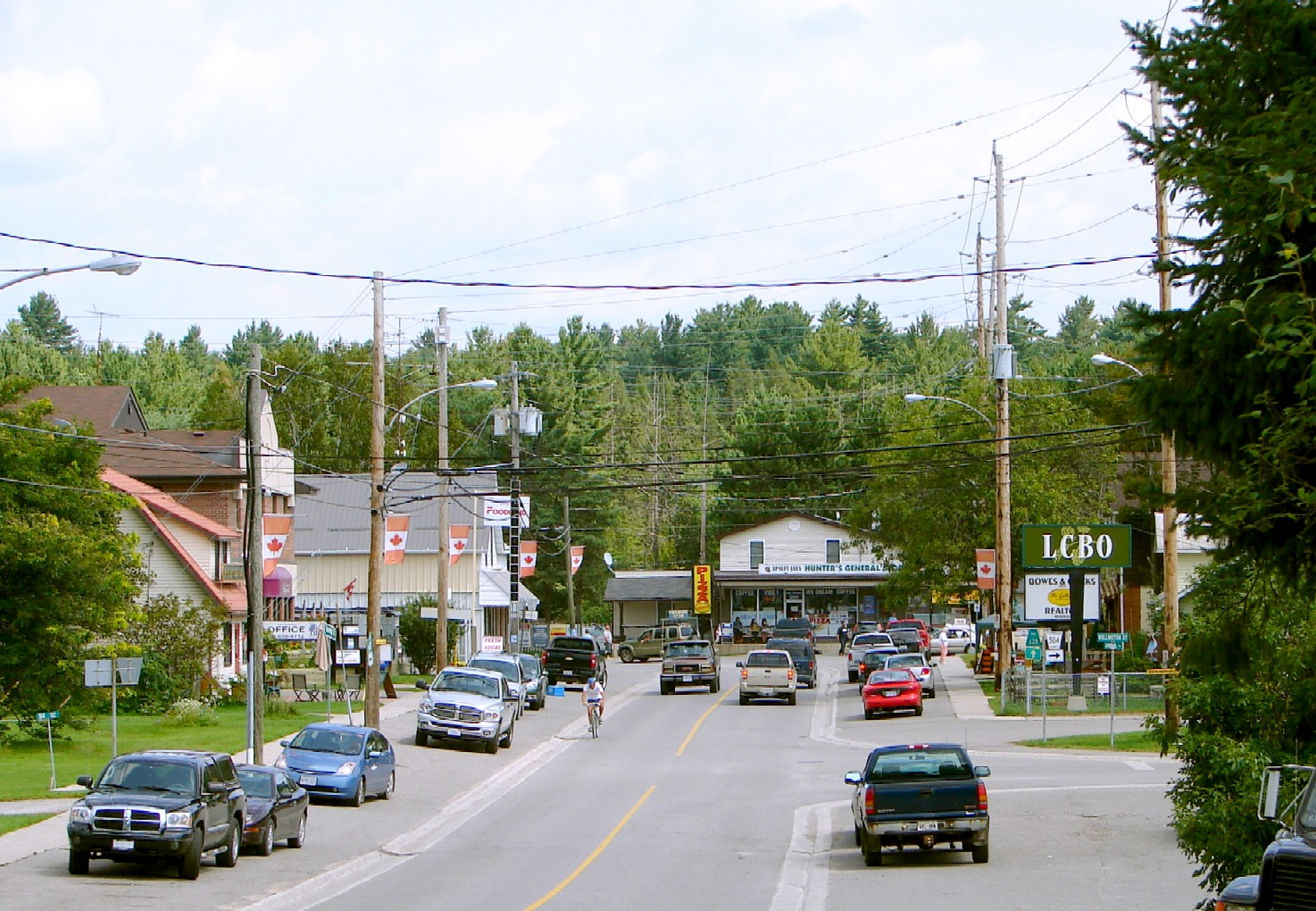
Apsley

Within the township are smaller urbanized areas such as the village of Apsley, and the hamlets of Big Cedar, Burleigh Falls, Glen Alda, Mount Julian, Stoneyridge and Woodview. These communities are surrounded by freshwater lakes including Chandos, Jack, Anstruther, Eels, and many more.

== Etymology ==
- Anstruther was likely named for Sir Windham Carmichael-Anstruther, 8th Baronet.
- Apsley was probably named for Apsley House, London residence of the Dukes of Wellington.
- Burleigh was likely named for Burleigh Hall in Leicestershire.
- Chandos was named in 1862 for Richard Temple-Nugent-Brydges-Chandos-Grenville, 3rd Duke of Buckingham and Chandos
- Kawartha comes from an aboriginal word Ka-wa-tha, meaning "land of reflections". For more on this etymology, see Kawartha Lakes.

== Demographics ==
In the 2021 Census of Population conducted by Statistics Canada, North Kawartha had a population of 2,877 living in 1,364 of its 3,693 total private dwellings, a change of 16.1% from its 2016 population of 2,479. With a land area of 746.35 km^{2} (288.17 sq mi), it had a population density of 3.9/km^{2} (10.0/sq mi) in 2021.

Canada census – North Kawartha community profile

	2021	2016	2011
Population	2,877 (+16.1% from 2016)	2 479 (8.3% from 2011)	2 289 (-2.3% from 2006)
Land area	746.35 km^{2} (288.17 sq mi)	776.01 km^{2} (299.62 sq mi)	776.04 km^{2} (299.63 sq mi)
Population density	3.9/km^{2} (10/sq mi)	3.2/km^{2} (8.3/sq mi)	2.9/km^{2} (7.5/sq mi)
Median age	59.2 (M: 59.2, F: 58.8)	55.4 (M: 55.2, F: 55.7)
Private dwellings	3,693 (total) 1,364 (occupied)	3 552 (total)	3 489 (total)
Median household income	$73,000	$57,792

References: 2021 2016 2011

Historical census populations – North Kawartha
Year	Pop.	±%
1996	2,104	—
2001	2,144	+1.9%
2006	2,342	+9.2%
2011	2,289	−2.3%
2016	2,479	+8.3%
2021	2,877	+16.1%
Source: Statistics Canada

== Government ==
The local government is the Corporation of the Township of North Kawartha. The current mayor is Carolyn Amyotte.

== Recreation ==
North Kawartha is home to the North Kawartha Knights, a junior hockey team playing in the Jr. C Central League of the Ontario Hockey Association. They started play in 2014. The home arena for the Knights is the North Kawartha Community Centre located in Apsley.

North Kawartha also has several golf courses, including Marvel Rapids golf course and Owenbrook golf course.

== Education ==
Apsley Central Public School, is the only school located in Apsley and provides education from kindergarten to grade 8. The school is under the jurisdiction of the Kawartha Pine Ridge District School Board. Secondary education requires travel outside to Peterborough.

== See also ==
- List of townships in Ontario
- Kawartha Lakes (Ontario), a chain of lakes
- Kawartha Lakes, a city
