= Trent–Severn Waterway =

Navigable route in Ontario, Canada

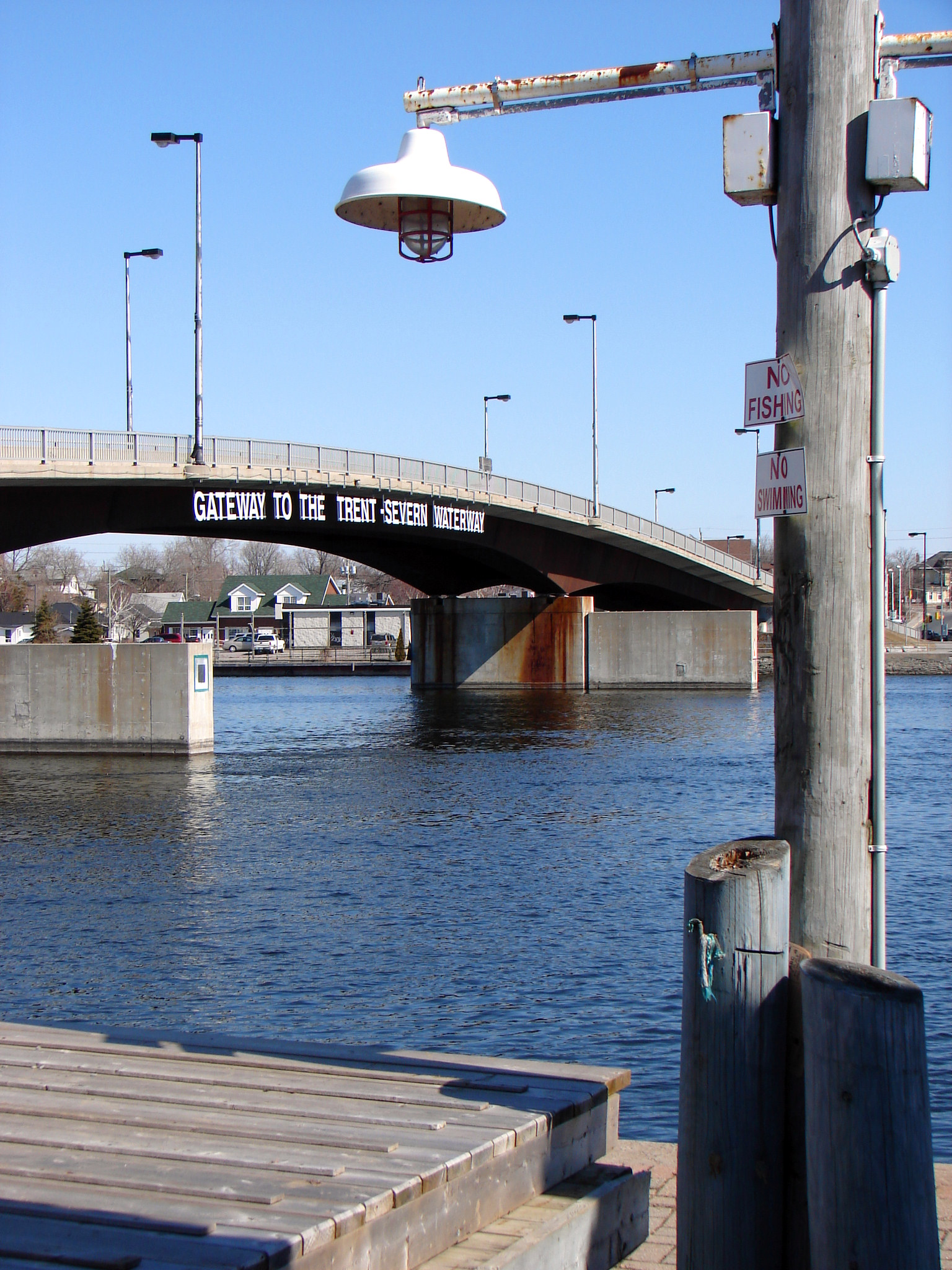
- The Veteran's Skyway Bridge in Trenton, labelled as the Gateway to the Trent–Severn Waterway
- Location: Ontario, Canada

Site notes
- Governing body: Parks Canada
- Website: www.pc.gc.ca/en/lhn-nhs/on/trentsevern

National Historic Site of Canada

Trent–Severn Waterway
- Interactive map of Trent–Severn Waterway

Specifications
- Length: 386 km (240 miles)
- Maximum boat length: 84 ft 0 in (25.60 m)
- Maximum boat beam: 23 ft 0 in (7.01 m)
- Maximum boat draft: 2.4 m (8') Locks 1 – 19; 1.8 m (6') Locks 20 – 45
- Locks: 44
- Status: Open

History
- Construction began: 1833; 193 years ago
- Date completed: 1920; 106 years ago

Geography
- Start point: Bay of Quinte
- End point: Severn Sound, Georgian Bay

The Trent–Severn Waterway is a 386-kilometre-long (240 mi) canal route connecting Lake Ontario at Trenton to Georgian Bay, Lake Huron, at Port Severn. Its major natural waterways include the Trent River, Otonabee River, Kawartha Lakes, Lake Simcoe, Lake Couchiching and Severn River. Its scenic, meandering route has been called "one of the finest interconnected systems of navigation in the world".

The canal was surveyed as a military route, but the first lock was built in 1833 as a commercial venture. This connected a number of lakes and rivers near the centre of the waterway, opening a large area to navigation by steamship. The government had begun construction of three additional locks when the Upper Canada Rebellion of 1837 broke out. This led the government to re-examine the project, concluding that the route would have too many locks to allow rapid movement for military purposes. They decided that the locks under construction would be completed, but the rest could be turned into timber slides. This left the completed inland section with no outlet, which business interests addressed by connecting to the route with a number of new toll roads, plank roads, and later, railways.

John A. Macdonald's government restarted construction in the 1880s, adding a number of new locks and pushing the route westward before construction once again halted. For many years after this, the canal was used as a political tool to garner votes from areas along the route, with little construction being carried out. It was not until just before the turn of the century that a number of political changes built up incredible pressure on Wilfrid Laurier's Liberals and serious work started once again. The canal reached Peterborough and Lake Simcoe in 1904. The final sections were greatly delayed by World War I, with the link to Trenton opening in 1918, followed by the link to Georgian Bay in early 1920. The first complete transit of the waterway was made in July of that year.

By the time the route was completed, its usefulness as a commercial waterway was over; ships plying the Great Lakes had grown much larger than the canal could handle, and the railways that had connected to the canal now took most of its freight. But the introduction of motor boats found the Trent–Severn perfectly positioned as a pleasure boating route, and today it is one of Ontario's major tourist attractions. Its passage through cottage country, both Muskoka in the west and the Kawarthas in the east, draws thousands of visitors every year. It also forms a major portion of the Great Loop. Today it is officially organized as a National Historic Site of Canada linear park operated by Parks Canada It is open for navigation from May until October, while its shore lands and bridges are open year-round.

== Geography ==
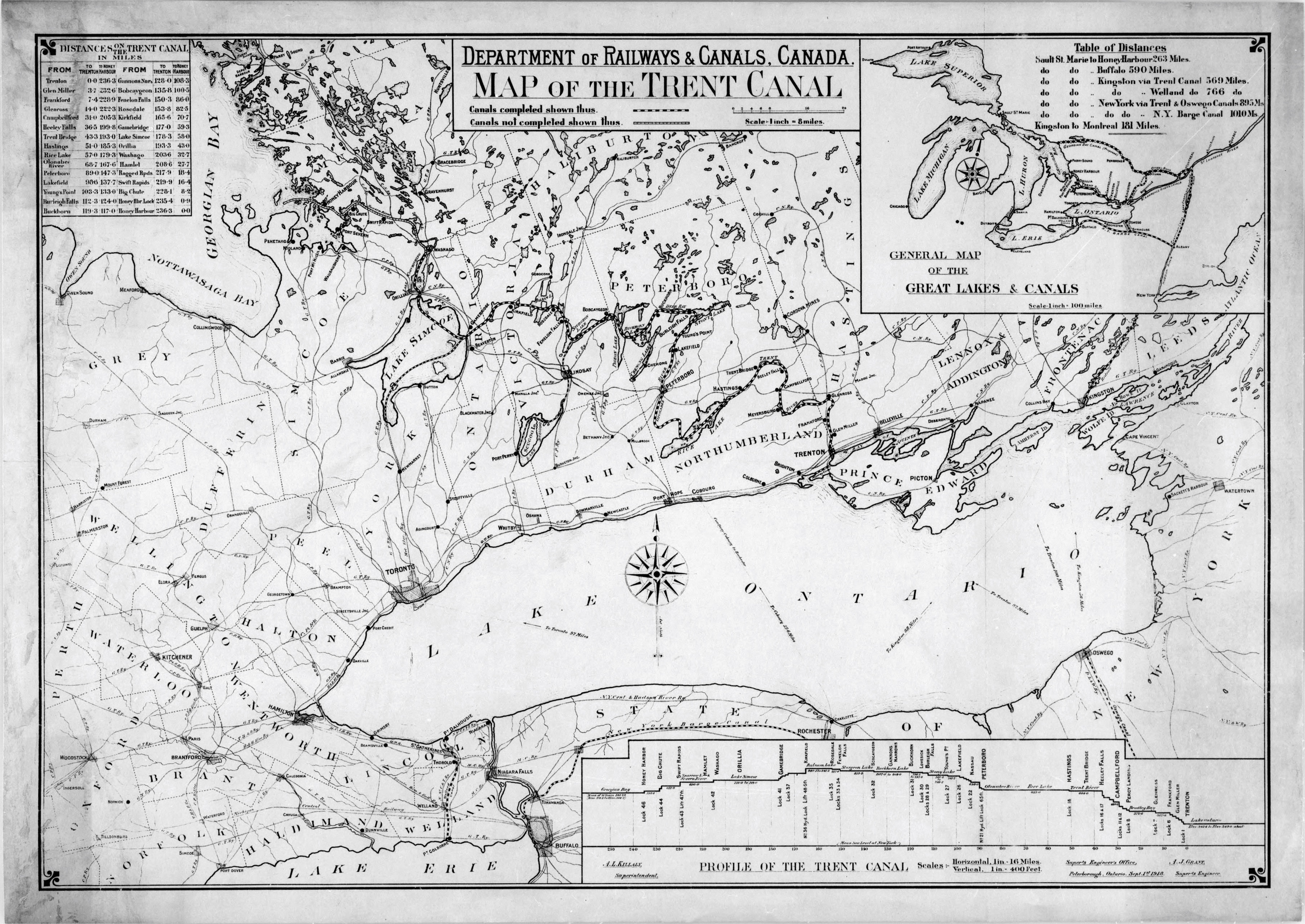
A map of the Trent–Severn Waterway as it appeared in 1918, just prior to its completion. The planned route still runs through Honey Harbour when this was prepared. The abandoned Newmarket Canal can be seen at the southern tip of Lake Simcoe.

The total length of the waterway is 386 kilometres (240 mi), beginning at Trenton, Ontario, with roughly 32 kilometres (20 mi) of man-made channels. There are 44 locks, including 37 conventional locks, two sets of flight locks, hydraulic lift locks at Peterborough and Kirkfield, and a marine railway at Big Chute which transports boats between the upper and lower sections of the Severn. The system also includes 39 swing bridges and 160 dams and control structures that manage the water levels for flood control and navigation on lakes and rivers that drain approximately 18,600 square kilometres (7,182 sq mi) of central Ontario's cottage country region, across four counties and three single-tier cities, an area that is home to more than a million Canadians.

It reaches its highest point of 256.3 metres (841 ft) at Balsam Lake, the highest point to which a vessel can be navigated from sea level in the Great Lakes–Saint Lawrence River drainage basin. The navigable summit of the Monongahela River (part of the Mississippi River drainage basin) at Fairmont, West Virginia is, at 263 metres (863 ft), the highest point in North America (the summit of the Rhine–Main–Danube Canal at its highest point of 406 metres (1,332 ft) is higher still).

The Trent–Severn Waterway is managed by Parks Canada under the statutory authority of the Historic Canals Regulations (which outline and delegate the responsibilities for navigation, resource protection, dredge and fill operations, the operation of boater campgrounds, etc.). The navigation corridor includes over 4,500 kilometres (2,796 mi) of shoreline and over 500 square kilometres (193 sq mi) of water. More than 125000 private and commercial properties abut the navigation corridor of the Trent–Severn Waterway. The Trent–Severn Waterway also has regulatory responsibility and authority under the Dominion Water Power Act for the 18 hydroelectric generating facilities located along its route.

== History ==
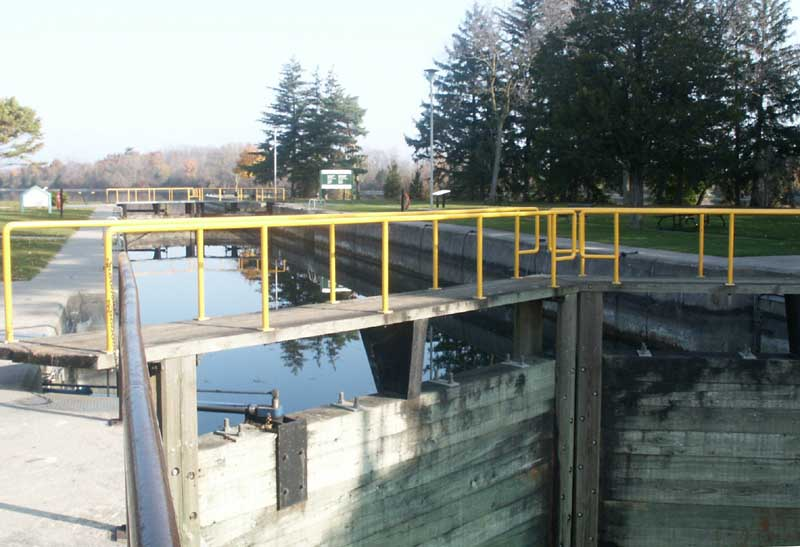
Lock One on the Trent–Severn Waterway

Samuel de Champlain was the first European to travel the network of inland waters from Georgian Bay to the Bay of Quinte with the Hurons in 1615. It was this same route that would later be canalized and become the Trent–Severn Waterway.

=== Military origins ===
The desire for a communications route from Lake Ontario to Lake Huron had been a topic of discussion as early as 1785, and gained new importance with the opening of the War of the First Coalition in 1793. Had the newly formed United States entered the conflict on the side of their French allies, they could have cut access to the upper great lakes at Detroit or Lake St. Clair. This would have denied waterborne access to the important British trading post at Michilimackinac.

To solve this problem, John Graves Simcoe, Lieutenant-Governor of Upper Canada, began construction of Yonge Street and the Penetanguishene Road to provide an overland portage route to Georgian Bay via Lake Simcoe that would bypass these choke points. Construction of Yonge began in 1794, reaching today's Holland Landing in 1796. However, the road was not passable for much of its length until 1816, and the entire route to Georgian Bay some time after that. The route was used for its original military purpose sparingly during the War of 1812, primarily to ship supplies to a naval depot built at Holland Landing. Its rough location is marked today by a large anchor that was being shipped from Chatham, England to Wasaga Beach (then known as Schooner Town), but was abandoned in Holland Landing when the war ended.

The lack of convenient access to the upper lakes demonstrated by the war led to new calls for inland waterways for military use, and led to the construction of a number of canals to provide rapid access to the Upper Canada area. These included canals at Grenville, Chute-à-Blondeau and Carillon Canals, all along the Ottawa River, as well as the most ambitious of them all, the 202 kilometres (126 mi)-long Rideau Canal from today's Ottawa to Kingston. Together, they connected Montreal, Ottawa and Lake Ontario, bypassing significant hazards along the Saint Lawrence River and long stretches of open water on Lake Ontario.

The need for a similar route bypassing Yonge Street and providing access to the upper lakes remained an issue, and several surveys in the area were carried out between 1815 and 1827. Prominent among these was a survey made by Catty in 1819, which concluded that no reasonable alternative to the Trent River was obvious on the eastern end of the route. Unfortunately, its circuitous route ran 67 miles (108 km) to Rice Lake before ending up only 12 miles (19 km) from the shores of Lake Ontario. Further, the Imperial government's interest was tempered by the cost of the Rideau, originally budgeted at $2,370,000 but eventually costing more than $4 million by the time it opened in 1832. Several attempts to raise the funds for the Trent system using local sources, including a proposed lottery, all failed and the plans remained dormant.

=== Bethune's lock ===
James Gray Bethune was a businessman in the port town of Cobourg with a steamship company working Lake Ontario. He was skeptical that the Trent connection would ever be built, but he felt that the inland sections north of Peterborough still offered considerable commercial prospects. The problem of connecting to Lake Ontario could be solved by other means. Bethune, a major player in local politics, led efforts to build a railway from Coburg, which would either have to route around Rice Lake through other counties, or build directly over it. Port Hope, a short distance to the west and a major competitor for Coburg's shipping traffic, proposed both a road and a canal. Port Hope's location at the western end of Rice Lake placed them slightly closer to the lake than Coburg, and offered a direct land route to Peterborough around the western tip of the lake while remaining within their Northumberland County.

By 1832, Bethune had completed his first plan for a combined canal and rail network. This would start in Coburg and run via railway to Sully (today known as Harwood), where it would connect to steamers on Rice Lake. These would cross the lake to the Otonabee River, providing access to southern Peterborough. Here they could transship via stagecoach to Bridgenorth on Lake Chemong. Locks at Purdy's Mill (today's Lindsay) and Bobcaygeon would provide access to an extended area including Pigeon Lake, Stony Lake, Sturgeon Lake and Lake Scugog, known collectively as the Back Lakes (today known as "the Kawarthas").

Bethune launched the Pemedash on Rice Lake in 1832, providing daily service between Peterborough and Coburg. The boat was a flat-bottomed design able to travel in shallow waters, more a powered barge than passenger steamer. It had side-wheels and was powered by what one passenger called a "feeble eighteen-horsepower engine". Catharine Parr Traill called it "a poor excuse for a steamboat" when her family used it in late summer 1832. A second steamer of the same design was built in Peterborough, sawn in half, carried overload to Bridgenorth and launched as the Sturgeon on 5 September 1833. Both steamers proved popular; in the less than three months the lakes were open to traffic in its first year of operation, the Sturgeon made 61 trips, delivering 60 barrels of pork and 55 tons of other cargo.

A group organized by Bethune met on 1 June 1833 to review tenders for the construction of a series of locks on the Back Lakes. However, they received only two tenders, both for the lock at Bobcaygeon. After several additional meetings and a visit to the site, the contract was awarded to Pierce, Dumble and Hoar for a price of $8,000. The company's crew arrived on 2 August and began construction immediately. The rest of the season was taken up with basic construction, blasting out the lock from the limestone with blackpowder. When the weather turned cold on 14 November the lock was nowhere near complete, and the contract was extended.

By the time the land thawed in the spring, Bethune was insolvent due to bookkeeping irregularities at his branch of the Bank of Upper Canada in Coburg, likely due to his use of some of these funds for the transport scheme. His steamers were sold off to new owners. In spite of there being no money from Bethune, and that the contract was clearly underbid, Pierce, Dumble, and Hoar decided to continue construction using their own funds. This proved disastrous; the lock was set too high in the rock and could not be filled at low water in the summer, and even when water was available it leaked out faster than it filled. It remained useless for four years.

=== Baird's survey ===
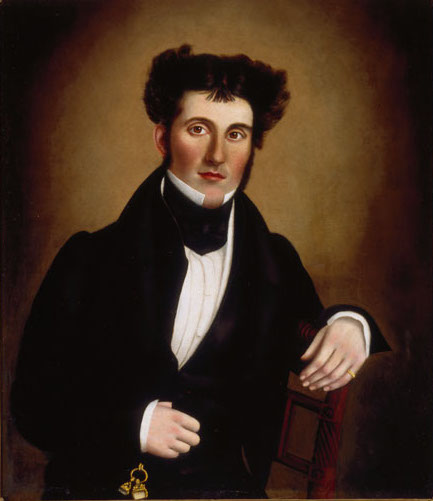
Baird would conduct most of the important surveys on the Trent–Severn Waterway.

Bethune's early efforts inspired others in the area to form plans of their own to build the complete network. Further progress ran afoul of local politics, in particular the fact that the route ran through two counties, Durham and Northumberland. These were represented by a total of three members of the Legislative Assembly of Upper Canada, each with their own ideas of where the southern end of canal should be built. John Brown was the director of the Port Hope Canal Company, while George Strange Boulton of Cobourg was busy forming the Cobourg and Rice Lake Railway with Bethune. Each favoured their own route in Durham, over the complaints of those living in Northumberland who wanted the route to follow the Trent through their county.

Boulton hatched a plan to kill the Trent route by ordering a complete survey of the river, hoping the cost of canalizing it would be far greater than building his railway. After several debates in the Legislature, on 13 February 1833 money was set aside for a survey, contracting Nicol Hugh Baird of Montreal to carry it out. Baird had worked on several canals and other engineering projects around the world, including the Rideau, and was at that time supervising a new bridge over the foot of the Trent that would replace a ferry service. Although the money had been set aside, nothing further occurred for months. This prompted a meeting in Peterborough on 27 August that demanded the work begin, leading to Baird's arrival on 7 September. As soon as word was out that he had arrived, citizen's groups in the two towns began tit-for-tat exchanges in local newspapers denouncing each other's efforts.

Baird's report was submitted on 28 November 1833. It placed the cost of making the Trent navigable to Rice Lake at $1,167,236 using 34 locks 134 feet (41 m) long and 34 feet (10 m) wide, along with 17 dams used to raise water levels in various portions of the route. He predicted it would take four years to complete. The report went on in great length to justify the expense, saying it would pay for itself in tolls, estimated to be $30,000 a year from timber shipments alone. On 6 March 1834, Robert Maigny submitted his estimates for the Port Hope Canal, using 34 locks 70 feet (21 m) by 14 feet (4.3 m) at a total cost of $507,130.

=== Huron link, expansion ===
At this point further work ended while the new Lieutenant Governor, Sir John Colborne, arranged a trip to visit the area. His six-day tour covered most of the lakes and rivers in the system, including the Talbot River that connected the Back Lakes to Lake Simcoe. On his return, taking Bethune's route using the Pemedash and then stage to York, he reported that he was delighted by his trip. Interpreted as support for further work on the system, this led to a petition calling for a route to connect Lake Simcoe with Rice Lake "by canal or otherwise". Baird was once again hired to survey this western section of the waterway.

Baird's new report was filed in September 1835, calling for another 32 locks and 13 dams, at a price of $1,310,340. Including the work on the Trent, this brought the price of the system as a whole to $2,477,575. Knowing that the legislature would be uninterested in such a proposal, he also outlined an alternative using a mix of water and rail transit, using specially designed barges that could carry a train of cars that would then be switched onto short sections of railway to bypass the trickier sections of the route. The idea was not unlike modern containerized shipping. Using this method, Baird believed that the price would be cut by about $1.5 million, and be completed in only three years. Perhaps believing this suggestion might be accepted, Baird also purchased stock in the Cobourg railway.

At this point the route began to experience pushback from the supporters of the Welland Canal, connecting Lake Ontario to Lake Erie. The Welland was losing money due to competition from the Erie Canal, and the prospect of another competitor to the north was a worrying development. The Ontario Legislature, then in the grip of the Family Compact, had powerful supporters of the Welland block further progress. William Hamilton Merritt, founder of the Welland Canal Company, was willing to support inland locks and even a private canal of the limited size proposed by Port Hope, but staunchly opposed any western extension. This opposition would frustrate further development for many years. With any hope of government backing clearly out of the question, the Port Hope and Rice Lake Canal Company closed down.

Strong support for the inland routes remained among the populace, and to appease these interests the government formed the Inland Water Commission to study the system. As an interim measure, on 3 March 1836 they submitted a new proposal for four locks at a total cost of $80,000. One of these would replace the nonfunctional lock at Bobcaygeon, one in Purdy's Mills (Lindsay) would allow transit to Lake Scugog, one at Whitla's Rapids (Scott's Mills) would allow passage further up the Otonabee in Peterborough, and one at Hastings, east of Rice Lake, would allow partial transit down the Trent. Together they would open 170 square miles (440 km^{2}) of waterway to continual navigation. Most importantly, the report noted that this would allow the iron ore at Marmora to travel west to Rice Lake where it could travel by train to Lake Ontario. This was approved by the legislature on 28 November 1836, while further proposals to improve various other locations were all ignored.

=== Hiatus ===
In the midst of construction, in 1837 the Upper Canada Rebellion broke out. Although quickly suppressed, the Rebellions of 1837 served to worry the Imperial government enough to appoint John Lambton, 1st Earl of Durham to fix the problems. In spite of holding the position of Governor General for only a brief period before resigning, his Report on the Affairs of British North America was implemented in large part and caused sweeping changes to the government. The newly merged Province of Canada had a single parliament with special rules intended to balance the power of the French and English speaking colonies.

As part of the formation of the new Province, the former Inland Water Commission was moved to the new government's Board of Works. The new government broke the power of the Family Compact, and reduced the influence of its French counterpart, the Château Clique. But it also resulted in a body whose decisions often separated along regional lines. By this time a new force had entered the process, central Ontario lumber barons. They used the many rivers of the province to float logs to mills, notably John Rudolphus Booth's mill in Ottawa, at that time the largest sawmill in the world. Locks presented a barrier to their rafts, as would any traffic on the rivers, so they were opposed to any further work on the system.

Examining the project, the Board of Works concluded that a route with as many locks as Baird had proposed would take so long to transit that it would not be useful militarily, and thus of little interest to the new federalist government. They agreed to continue construction of the four locks contracted in 1836, largely as a way to employ the many immigrants arriving in the area. They showed little interest in the rest of the route, and agreed to allow the rest of the surveyed lock locations to be turned into timber slides.

=== Road and railway connections ===
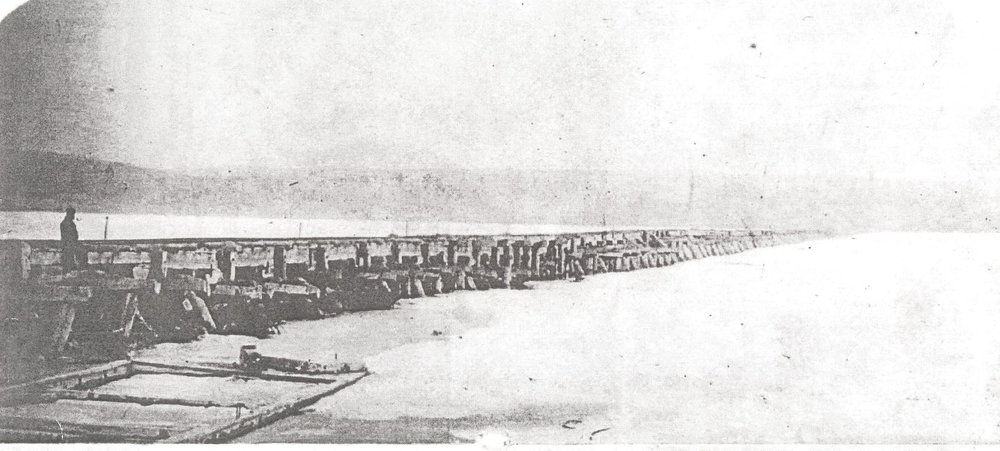
This dilapidated causeway ran the Cobourg and Peterborough over Rice Lake, providing an eastern outlet for cargo on the Back Lakes.

With the completion of the four locks, the Back Lakes were now open to navigation for most of the year. Newly arriving settlers in the area expanded the types of products available. By the 1850s, Peterborough had gristmills, sawmills, carding and fulling mills and a tannery. Meanwhile, logging companies and farmers were setting up all across central Ontario, using the lakes to ship their products. This left the problem of getting these products to market, which in turn led to a small railway rush with the express intent of connecting to the Back Lake navigation. Through the 1850s and '60s, numerous railways were built to connect at various points.

The first to make the attempt was the long-planned Cobourg and Rice Lake Railway. Having originally been planned in 1831 and chartered in 1834, the Panic of 1837 and Rebellion later that year upset their plans to the point where the company's charter lapsed in 1840. Next was the Peterborough and Port Hope Railway (P&PH), the competing plan from Port Hope, which had the advantage of being able to loop around the western edge of Rice Lake to produce an all-land route directly to Peterborough. This so worried Cobourg interests that they hired Baird to plan a road route, and opened the Cobourg Plank Road in 1846. This stymied the P&PH, who decided to reroute their line westward to Beaverton on Lake Simcoe.

The numerous delays meant that there was still no rail connection to the waterway in 1850. The original Cobourg group reorganized as the Cobourg and Peterborough Railway in 1852, this time planning to bridge over Rice Lake and provide direct access to Peterborough. The line opened on 29 December 1854, but suffered from continual damage due to ice that closed the Rice Lake bridge for much of its history. In spite of these problems, the railway provided the long-needed route south, and was one of the most financially successful routes in the area. The good times came to an end when the Port Hope interests, now known as the Port Hope, Lindsay and Beaverton Railway (but soon to be renamed as the Midland Railway of Canada), opened the Millbrook Branch that reached Peterborough on 12 May 1858.

Among the other routes available were another plank road further west from Whitby to Lake Scugog, which offered access to the waterway via the lock at Lindsay. This was the closest point on the network to Toronto, and the town of Prince Albert at its midpoint became the largest grain trading site in Upper Canada. This route, today known as Brock Street in Whitby, was rendered superfluous by the Whitby, Port Perry and Lindsay Railway (WPP&L), which ran beside it and offered far faster service to Toronto. Other routes connected to points further north, including the Victoria Railway that met the waterway at Fenelon Falls, the Lindsay, Bobcaygeon and Pontypool Railway that met it at Lindsay and Bobcaygeon, the Toronto and Nipissing Railway that met it at the northern tip of Balsam Lake. These had the advantage of running directly into Toronto, avoiding a switch onto the Grand Trunk Railway needed on the WPP&L.

=== Confederation and the Trent Valley Canal Association ===
Work on the canal system remained stagnant until Confederation in 1867. This turned the Province of Canada's government into a federal body, and gave the new province of Ontario's government control over construction. Lacking the power of the federal coffers, they could only afford small projects. Between confederation and 1879 they rebuilt the lock at Lindsay, which had been converted to a timber slide, and built new locks at Young's Point and Rosedale. These enlarged the continuous area served by the waterway, but still lacked any outlet to the major bodies of water.

Having watched work on the system stagnate for years, in September 1879 a group of Conservative politicians formed the Trent Valley Canal Association to agitate for further work. They were soon joined by Liberals and neutral parties, eventually coming to represent almost every riding from Trenton to Midland. The Toronto Tribune noted that "Their activity shows an amount of energy that betokens a body determined to deserve success." For the next forty years, the Association maintained its pressure on successive governments and never allowed any of them to renege on their agreements to continue work on the system. Their basic concept, agreed to at their first meeting, was to arrange periodic meetings of all the municipal leaders along the route, and collect petitions from their constituents, as well as ask them to write letters directly to their members of Parliament. This quickly produced an almost continual stream of letters.

The concept proved successful, and the government of John A. Macdonald was convinced to provide funding to add new locks at Burleigh Falls, Lovesick Lake, Buckhorn and Fenelon Falls. This greatly expanded the navigable route, from Balsam Lake in the west to Lakefield in the east. In 1881, oversight of the expansion was given to Tom Rubidge of Peterborough. Rubidge had already concluded that the Trent system was essentially useless in comparison to the Sydenham-Killaly proposals to expand navigation on the St. Lawrence, which would be able to carry ships. He felt any work on the Trent at this point was a waste of money and was unhappy to be put in charge of the project. His distaste was further increased when his infant daughter Mary died in 1883 while he was surveying the route. He is noted for his "cussedness" and lack of public relations capability, qualities that dogged his time on the Trent.

Among the most difficult of the sections completed during this period was the locks at Burleigh Falls; Baird had described the "dreaded iron-bound nature of the rock" which required new tools and techniques to beat. The work was finally undertaken by George Goodwin starting in late 1884, using steam powered drills and shovels. It was during this time that one of the most infamous events in the system's history took place; at 9:45 a.m. on 4 September 1885 James Simmons and George Morton were hauling a load of dynamite from Tweed to Burleigh Falls when it exploded, leaving behind a 100 foot (30 m) wide crater and nothing but bits of horse and man. The site became a brief tourist attraction.

Construction was beset by arguments between Rubidge and the construction team led by Goodwin. From late 1886, Rubidge was under extreme pressure from the press and the politicians along the line, and he became increasingly paranoid, suspicious of everyone involved in the project for their real or imagined attempts to have him removed. He took his anger out on the project as a whole, and especially Goodwin, who began to complain to Rubidge's superiors in Ottawa. Rubidge responded by appointing two of his helpers to watch over the construction, harassing Goodwin and his workers continually with a range of problems, even locking up the canoes of the government engineers so they could not get around the sites. Goodwin's complaints grew in frequency and anger, and finally he demanded that John Page, the engineer in the Department of Canals and Railways overseeing all canal work, visit the site. This request eventually led to Rubidge's removal from the oversight position and his replacement by David Stark, at that time the superintendent of Ottawa River canal projects. Construction was finally completed in 1887, and the first boat passed through the entire section on 26 October.

=== Another hiatus, another report ===
The federal elections in early 1887 led to Macdonald winning a solid majority in spite of promising nothing to the canal. This cost the Conservatives several seats in the area, but his support of the protectionist National Policy won him many others in the area among businesses that were worried about being flooded by cheap US products. The press was filled with comments to the effect that Macdonald had only been interested in the canal as a vote-getting measure; the Peterborough Examiner led the charges, complaining that "Whatever expenditure there had been on the scheme is properly chargeable to the capital (political) account and this is the explanation of all the delay and trifling with this important work." With every delay the canal became more important to the locals, prompting one long-time Macdonald supporter, Reverend J. Logan, to be quoted saying "Henceforth I have only one politic and that is the Trent Valley Canal."

Rubidge was still involved in the Trent at this time, having been tasked with producing a survey of the complete route and cost estimates for its completion. After the election, John Page sent Rubidge back to Peterborough to complete this work. Rubidge took the opportunity to return to the worksite and claim he was always in command and had left only for personal reasons. Stark had not yet arrived, and with the work essentially completed by this time, no one seems to have been willing to invest the effort to find out what was going on. When Stark did begin to assert some control, he started by asking one of the other government engineers working with Rubidge, Aylmer, to set up a new office in Peterborough. As he left, Aylmer took the opportunity to break into Rubidge's desk and take the now long-overdue survey with him, prompting a break-and-enter charge which Aylmer countered with a libel charge. Another of the government engineers, Fuller, ended up in a fist fight with Rubidge over a property dispute, leading to Fuller's conviction on assault and his dismissal from the department.

Looking for any reason to cancel further work, or at least delay it, Macdonald inquired about the status of Rubidge's survey. Rubidge promised it would be ready for 20 August, but it never appeared. Stark telegraphed Rubidge on 1 September about it, and Rubidge stated that his fight with Fuller had put it off. It was finally delivered in 15 November. The report closely followed Baird's plans completed decades earlier, changing only its ultimate outlet on the west, following the North River to Waubaushene. He placed the cost at $8,684,650, including another 71 locks in addition to the 12 already built or nearing completion, as well as 58.7 miles (94.5 km) of dug canal. Page added another $1.1 million in ancillary charges like land claims and completion of the work already underway, bringing the total for the entire waterway to $9,984,500. This compares with Baird's original estimate of $2.5 million, a number that Stark had personally backed in 1880. This prompted Stark to send in his own estimate, returning to the original Severn route in the west, and calculated the new total to be only $3 million.

This latest controversy was just what Macdonald was waiting for. Pointing out the huge differences in the two estimates, on 8 October 1887 he formed the Trent Valley Canal Commission to study the issue. This was immediately denounced as a measure "to give them an opportunity to get out of the work." This is precisely what happened; the first meeting of the Commission was not scheduled until 1 April 1888, and the final report was not expected until after the next election. A series of interviews were carried out and questionnaires sent which garnered little response, which the Commission took as evidence that there was little interest in the topic. In 1890 an interim report caused Macdonald to suggest that "Some further enquiry is necessary". One of the few positive results was a measure of the water supply by the new chief engineer of the Trent, Richard Rogers, that suggested there was a million times more water available than would be needed for the entire route to lock 100 times a day for the 200-day navigation period.

The Commission handed in its final report on 17 December 1890. They accepted Rogers' calculation of the amount of water available and generally agreed that the routes were possible and even desirable. They also suggested that some of the more complex areas could be greatly simplified by replacing a series of locks with a single hydraulic boat lift, and recommended further study into this option. They also left considerable room for interpretation as to the desirability of completing the works at either end, allowing politicians to pick and chose what sections, if any, they agreed to fund.

=== Decision to complete ===
By the time the Commission filed their report, parliament was out for the 1891 elections, just what Macdonald had hoped would happen by forming the Commission. As the election continued, it appeared it would be a very close fought result, and Macdonald decided to use the Trent to shore up any seats he could. On 3 March he was personally handed a letter by D.R. Murphy, a Conservative organizer in the Trent area, asking for any help he might provide. Macdonald, ill and bedridden, replied with a telegram stating "Trent Valley Canal Commission have reported favourably on the completion of the scheme. Parliament will be asked next session for a grant for the purpose." Nine of the thirteen seats in the area were won by Conservatives, reversing their losses from the previous election. Macdonald lived only a short time after the election and suffered a series of strokes that led to his death on 6 June 1891.

In the aftermath of Macdonald's death, the Conservatives went through a series of leaders as they lurched from one political disaster to the next. In spite of repeated promises to carry out Macdonald's last wishes regarding the canal, nothing had been completed by the time another election began to approach. Then there was a flurry of highly visible surveys carried out, and Rogers was asked to complete detailed plans for further construction. On 22 April 1895 a $475,000 contract was signed for a canal between Balsam Lake and Kirkfield. A second followed on 27 August for the first section from Lakefield to Peterborough. The Peterborough Examiner was not amused, asking, "Why have five years, singularly coincident with the general election, been allowed to elapse between the spurts of activity that mark the survey and construction of portions of the canal? Why ... has it been degraded into a vote-catching machine?"

Although the Conservatives attempted to use the Trent to the advantage once again, the attempt failed in Wilfrid Laurier's strong win in the 1896 election. Having watched the canal hand the Conservatives votes for decades, the new Liberal government immediately cancelled the work. But it was not long before the same political forces that led the Conservatives to support the plan soon found their effect on the Liberals as well, and yet another meeting with the Trent Association and a subsequent visit by George Albert Blair, the newly appointed Minister of Canals and Railways. The Association's trump card was the argument that the canal could be a significant shipping route for grain from western Canada, which at that time was having trouble moving eastward due to insufficient capacity in the railway and waterway systems.

But this argument backfired; Blair agreed a canal was needed, but argued instead for a new system along the St. Lawrence. Laurier himself strongly supported railways, especially the Grand Trunk Pacific Railway project. Once again the Association swung into action, bringing over 270 delegates to a meeting on the issue in Ottawa. The Grand Trunk, whose line along the St. Lawrence stood to lose considerable traffic if an alternate shipping route was completed, nevertheless provided train tickets to everyone involved at a reduced fare. The result was a huge crowd of businessmen who descended on Ottawa on 6 April 1897, and began a series of speeches calling for the completion of the Trent. After some time, Laurier himself rose to speak and stated "The government has adopted the completion of the Trent Valley route as part of their policy." This was met by thunderous applause.

=== Opposition from Toronto ===
By this time the era of the barge canal as a commercial system was over. The formerly hugely profitable Erie Canal watched traffic dwindle as freight moved to railways, so its operators made it free to use in hopes of maintaining traffic levels and their positive economic effects on the surrounding towns. But this change had little effect, and traffic continued to decline. The chief engineer of New York, who had control over the canal, stated that "canals as a successful and necessary means of transportation have outlived their usefulness." When a multi-national panel was formed to consider several possible routes to link the upper Great Lakes to the Atlantic, the Trent was not even mentioned.

In the case of the Trent, the railways originally intended to service the waterway now provided an even better transport option. The operators of these railways would compete with any commercial traffic on the canal, and this was especially disconcerting for the grain trade the Trent Association had pitched. The Canadian Pacific Railway (CPR), then stopping at Fort William, were in the midst of completing a link to the Montreal area, as well as building out a network of shorter links in the southern Ontario area that serviced the lake trade. Another railway rush ensued as the Grand Trunk and Canadian Northern Railway (CNoR) bought up similar lines, all with the hopes of gaining some part of the rapidly growing grain trade. At the time, almost all of these routes ran through Toronto.

When Laurier made his announcement, the possibility that the Trent would provide any sort of reasonable shipping route in lieu of railways or a canal able to carry oceangoing ships was immediately attacked by business interests in Toronto. When the first $600,000 contract was announced on 31 May 1898, Edmund Osler, member for Toronto West and a director of the Canadian Pacific Railway (CPR), was the first to oppose it in parliament, stating that the government must have "money to burn." To the great amusement of the Liberals, other Conservatives from the Trent area then began arguing with Osler. Nevertheless, the government agreed to use the funds released in that budget solely for the completion of existing work, as opposed to expansions. It soon became clear that Laurier's government was delaying any further work.

=== Laurier completes the system ===
Matters changed with the rise of the Liberal's new leadership under the direction of Wilfrid Laurier. Prior to the 1896 election the party had strongly supported free trade with the US, known as "reciprocity", but put this aside for this election and accepted the high-tariff, protectionist National Policy. To support industry, they proposed a wide variety of public works, especially those that took place in Conservative ridings that were subject to swaying. This was the case for all of the Ontario counties involved in the Trent system, and it became a centrepiece of the Ontario strategy. With their election win, in spite of losing the popular vote, the party began the final completion of the Trent system.

At this time, business interests in Port Hope once again argued for completing the route by making a new canal from the western end of Rice Lake south to their town. This would place the exit closer to Toronto and make the route shorter overall. A January 1900 report noted it would add 59 miles (95 km) to the route to Montreal, still the ultimate endpoint for overseas shipping, but much more importantly ships would have to travel in the open across Lake Ontario, whereas the Trenton exit was protected. A follow-up report suggested the Trenton route would be cheaper and contracts were sent out for this section, and while several tenders were received, once again the government declined to begin construction.

=== Mulock's madness ===
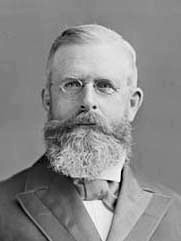
Always a supporter of the Trent, William Mulock's attempts to extend the project ultimately helped topple the Liberal government.

While this work was ongoing, a side-project began that ultimately brought down the Liberals. William Mulock of Newmarket, a growing industrial and market town north of Toronto, was Laurier's right-hand-man in the province. In 1904 the Northern Railway of Canada raised its rates and made several changes that would greatly increase the costs of the industries in the town, so much they claimed it would put them out of business. Mulock hatched a plan to extend the Trent south to the town, an extension officially known as the Holland Subdivision, but universally referred to as the Newmarket Canal.

Critics attacked the concept immediately, pointing out that the economic potential of such a link was nonexistent. But the possibility of bringing federal money to his riding in York North was too good to give up, and Mulock campaigned for it continually, presenting petitions on the part of local residents in favour. However, a survey put the price well over $300,000, a significant amount for such a short link, and was then greatly increased due to changes that appear to have been politically motivated on the part of the Department of Railways and Canals. By the time the plans were complete, the price was approaching $1 million.

In spite of this price, and that Mulock had left the seat in 1905, the party continued to support the project in order to keep the riding in their hands. It became the subject of continual attacks by the Conservatives in the House, and when calculations showed there was too little water to keep it running in the summer, it was heaped with scorn in the press. The party continued to support it throughout, even as it became clear the project was doomed.

The 1911 election brought a swift end to what was by then known as "Mulock's madness". Within days of taking office, Robert Borden ordered a review of the project, and cancelled it shortly thereafter. The remains of the construction, estimated to be 85% complete by that time, were abandoned in place and dot the local landscape to this day. The locals now refer to it as the "ghost canal".

=== Canal today ===
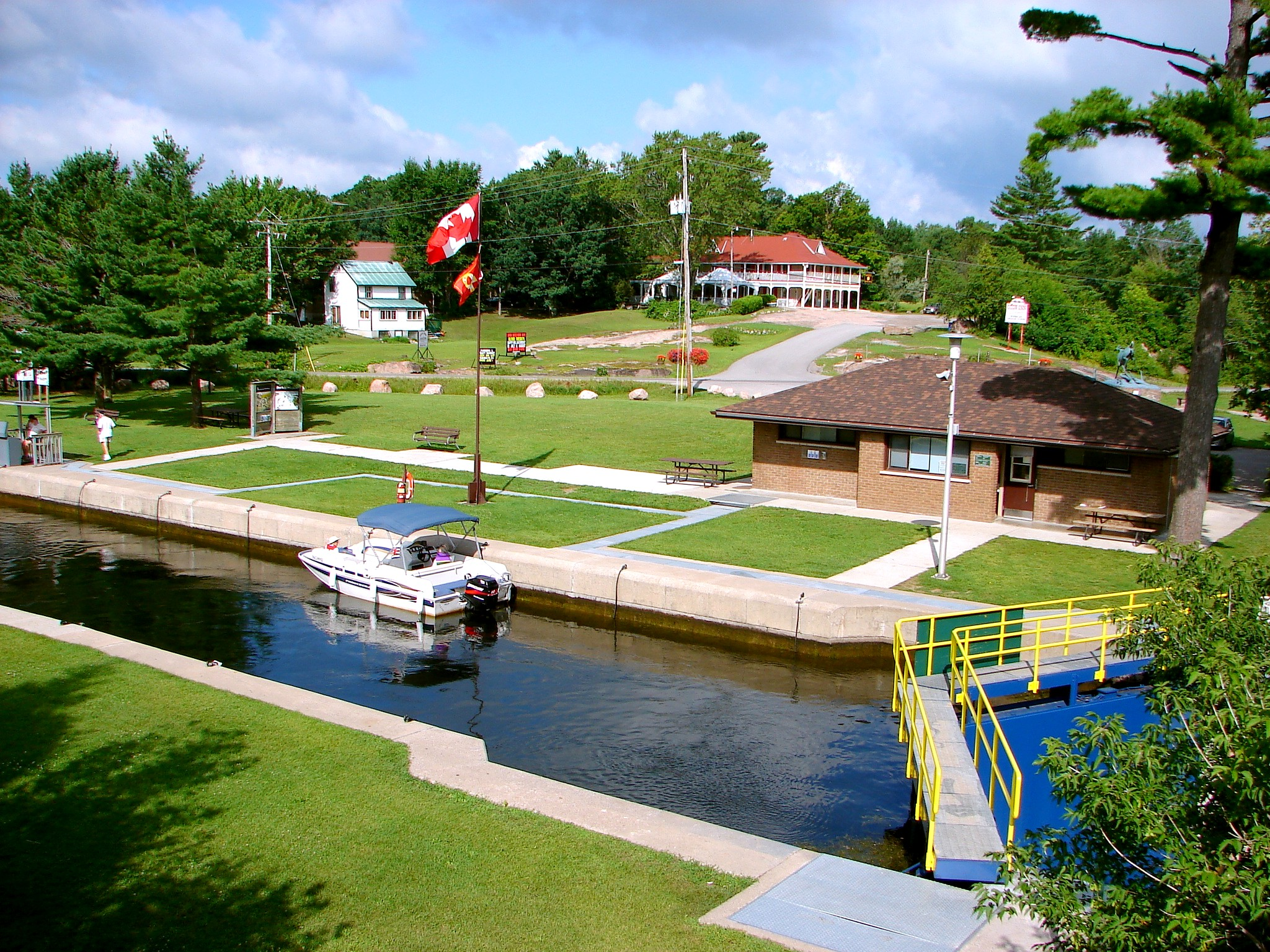
The lock at Buckhorn is typical of the Waterway today, with service buildings for the lock staff and users of the locks.

Travel was blocked beyond Balsam Lake until the opening of the Kirkfield Lift Lock in 1907.

The lock system aided the development of central Ontario, allowing a quick and efficient flow of goods to and from the major trading centres along Lake Ontario. The rugged, rough terrain of this area of the province made travel by land extremely difficult and time-consuming.

When the canal was finally completed in 1920, it failed to have a major impact on the economy of the regions it was built to serve. By the time it was completed its design had been made obsolete by larger boats: it had been designed for boats too small to be commercially viable. In the years that it was under construction, railways had further developed their networks and improved service, which influenced settlement patterns.

In 1910–11, the Township of Smith and the Chemong Yacht Club filed a claim for land damages caused by the Trent Canal.

The waterway became obsolete for commercial purposes when the present day Welland Canal was completed in 1932. The Welland Canal could handle ships large enough to sail across the ocean, though cargo was generally transferred to or from larger ocean-going vessels at Montreal.

The Trent–Severn system is still in service. It is maintained and operated by the national park service, Parks Canada, and now is used for tourism and by recreational boaters. There is a cruise line that operates the ship Kawartha Voyageur, as well as houseboat rental firms. In June 2013, Barry Devolin, Member of Parliament for the riding of Haliburton—Kawartha Lakes—Brock, reintroduced Bill C-530, the "Trent–Severn Water Authority Act", in order to re-capitalize the century-old infrastructure of the waterway.

Technical and navigational details (such as speed limit, maximum draft, maximum water depth and bridge clearances) can be found at Parks Canada's website.

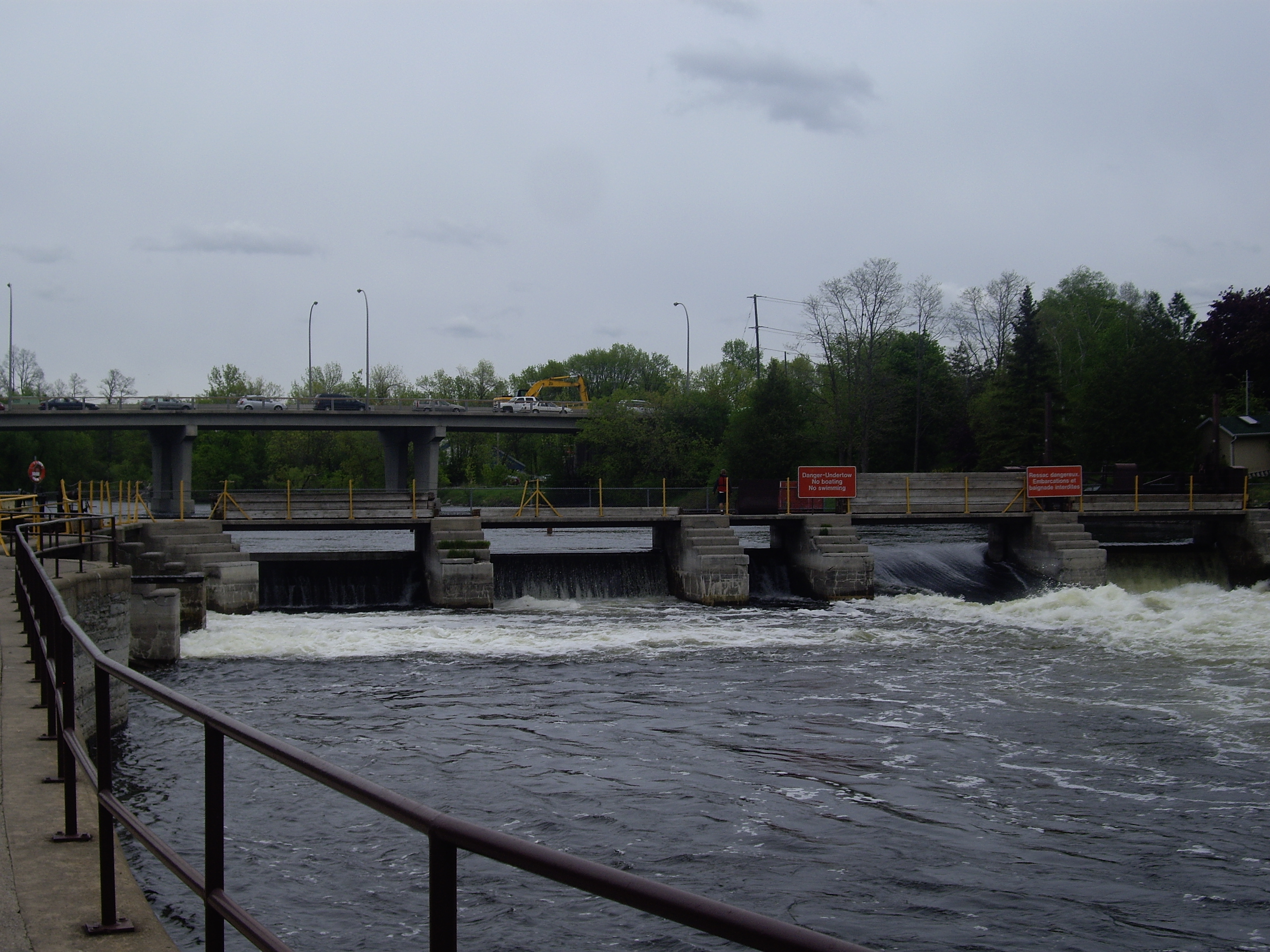
Trent–Severn Waterway entering Peterborough at Scotts Mills

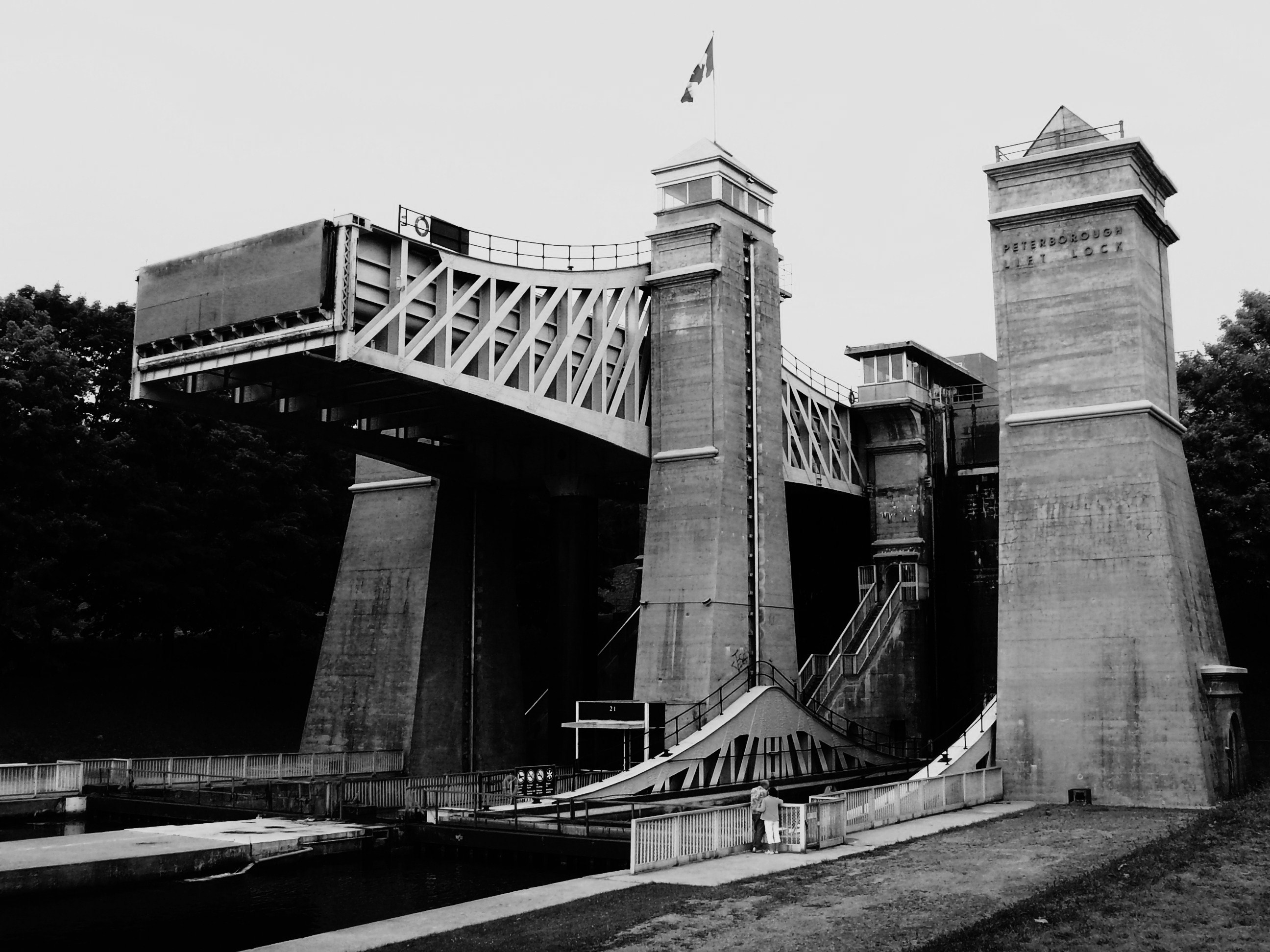
Peterborough Lift Lock

Kirkfield Lift Lock

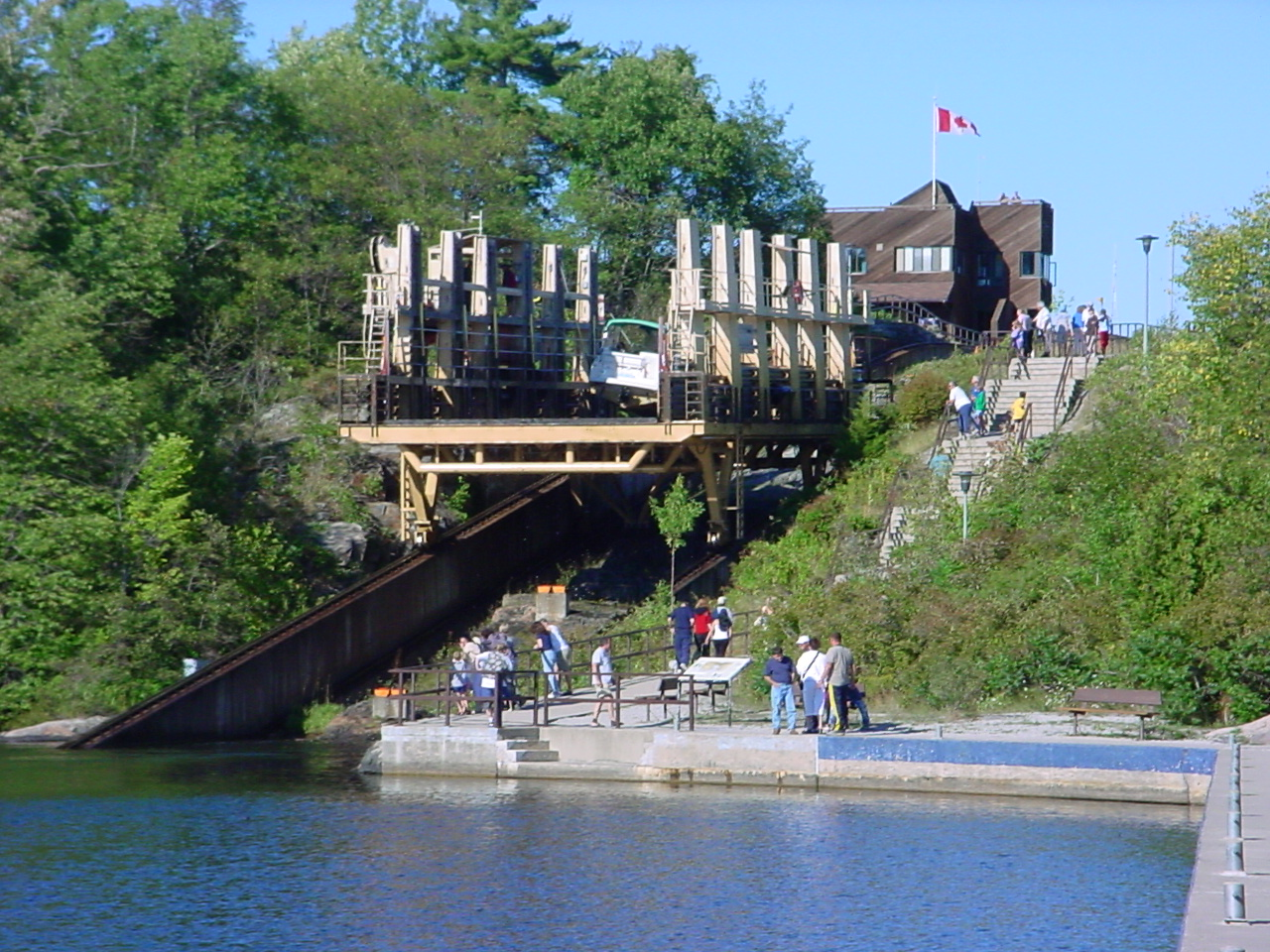
Big Chute Marine Railway

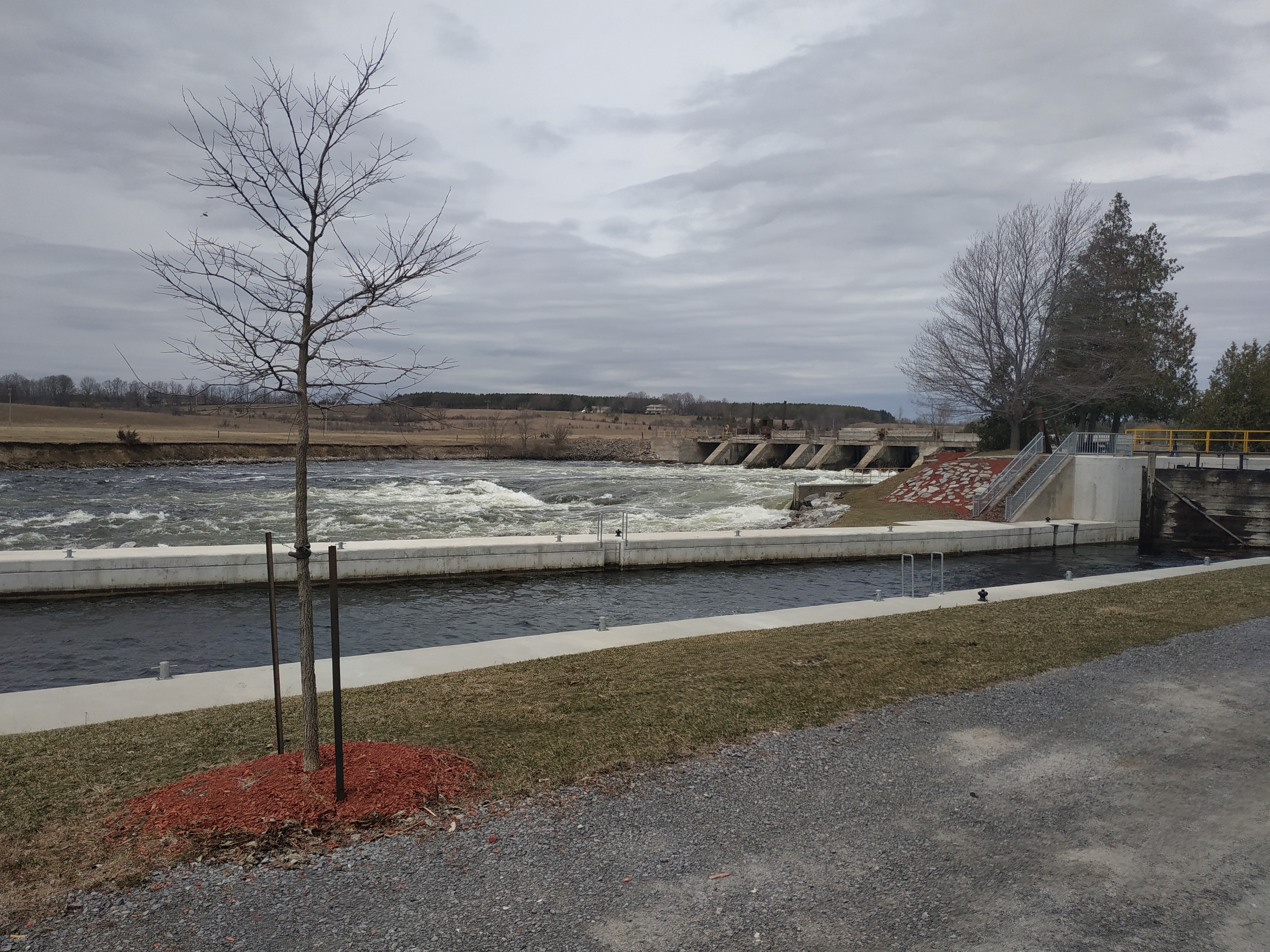
Lock 25 - Sawer Creek

== See also ==
- Ottawa River Waterway – Northeastern Ontario waterway
- Rideau Canal – Eastern Ontario waterway
- Welland Canal – Southern Ontario waterway
