= Ontario Highway 500 =

Secondary Highway 500, commonly referred to as Highway 500, was a secondary highway in the Canadian province of Ontario which was first designated in 1956. Its route was renumbered in 1964, becoming:

- Highway 649 between Bobcaygeon and the junction with Highway 121 south of Kinmount.
- Highway 503 between Kinmount and Tory Hill.
- Highway 648 in its entirety from east of Tory Hill to west of Cardiff.
- Highway 118 between Highway 503 and the western junction of Highway 648, and between the eastern junction Highway 648 and Highway 28 in Paudash.
- Highway 28 between Paudash and Highway 41 in Denbigh, via Bancroft.
