= Ontario Highway 503 =

Former Ontario provincial highway

Highway 503

Route information
- Maintained by the Ministry of Transportation of Ontario
- Length: 116.8 km (72.6 mi)
- Existed: May 9, 1956–January 1, 1998

Major junctions
- South end: Highway 48 in Kirkfield
- Highway 35 in Norland; Highway 121 in Kinmount
- East end: Highway 118 – Tory Hill

Location
- Country: Canada
- Province: Ontario
- Divisions: Victoria County, Peterborough County, Haliburton County
- Villages: Kirkfield, Sebright, Norland, Kinmount, Gooderham, Tory Hill

Highway system
- Ontario provincial highways; Current; Former; 400-series
← Highway 502	→ Highway 504

Secondary Highway 503, commonly referred to as Highway 503, was a provincially maintained secondary highway in the Canadian province of Ontario. The 116.8 km (72.6 mi) route existed between 1956 and 1998. Between 1956 and 1963, the highway stretched from Kirkfield to Sebright, and then along the Monck Road from Sebright to Kinmount, entirely within Victoria County. In 1964, the route was extended to Highway 121 in Tory Hill along the route of Highway 500 through the counties of Peterborough and Haliburton. In 1998, the route was transferred to the various counties in which it resided. Today it is known as Kawartha Lakes City Road 6 and 45, Peterborough County Road 503 and Haliburton County Road 503.

The route of former Highway 503 passes through several unincorporated villages along its length, including Sebright, Uphill, Norland, Dongola, Kinmount and Gooderham, in addition to the villages at either terminus. Outside of those communities the route is generally forested, but provides access to recreational cottages surrounding the many lakes that dot the region.

== Route description ==
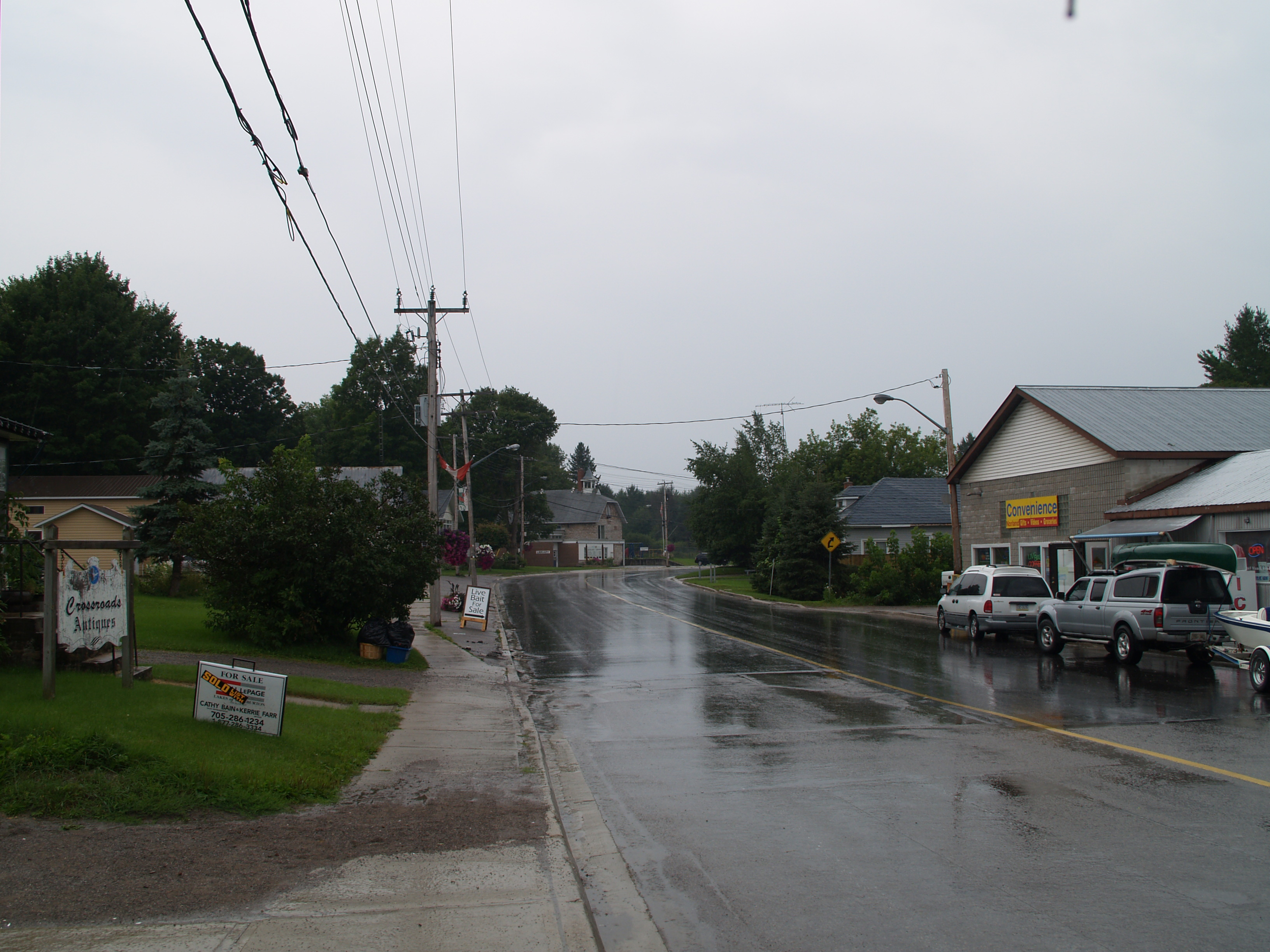
Highway 503 in Norland

Highway 503 was a 116.8 km (72.6 mi) route that travelled through the counties of Victoria (now Kawartha Lakes), Peterborough and Haliburton. An addition to providing access to recreational cottages surrounding the many lakes surrounding the former highway, it connected the unincorporated communities of Kirkfield, Sebright, Uphill, Norland, Dongola, Kinmount, Gooderham and Tory Hill. The former highway is a paved two lane road throughout its length.

Beginning in Kirkfield, the former highway travels north as a continuation of Kawartha Lakes City Road 6, which it is designated as to Sebright. It passes beneath the Kirkfield Lift Lock, which carries the Trent–Severn Waterway between Balsam Lake and Canal Lake. Surrounded by the grasslands that thrive in the thin soils of the Carden Alvar Provincial Park, it zig-zags northwest to Dalrymple before turning north along the Kawartha Lakes – Simcoe County boundary. It continues along the west side of Lake Dalrymple to Sebright, where it intersects the Monck Road.

The former highway turned east onto the Monck Road, which is now numbered as Road 45 in both Simcoe County and Kawartha Lakes. For the first several kilometres east of Sebright, the road travels through scattered farmland. It then descends from the Ordovician limestone into the Precambrian Canadian Shield and parallels the Head River. Meandering through thick Boreal forest, it reaches Uphill, where it intersects the northern terminus of former Highway 505. Continuing eastward, it curves south to travel around the south side of Head Lake, passing through the village of the same name and turning east towards Norland.

In Norland, the former route of Highway 503 intersects Highway 35 and crosses the Gull River. It then travels along the north side of Shadow Lake before reaching the ghost town of Dongola. The route follows a straight line the majority of the distance between Dongola and Kinmount, where it encounters a former portion of Highway 121. Highway 503 and Highway 121 were concurrent for a short distance across the Burnt River. East of Kinmount the former route parallels the Irondale River to Gooderham. It briefly enters Peterborough County before travelling along the Peterborough–Haliburton county line to Furnace Falls, prior to which it turns north into Haliburton County.

Within Haliburton County, the former highway travels around the north side of Irondale, curving east. It continues to meander alongside the Irondale River into Gooderham, intersecting the northern end of former Highway 507. Gradually curving northeast, the former route diverges from the Irondale River towards Tory Hill. There the route ended at an intersection with what was then Highway 118, but has since become Highway 121. Highway 121 west is the branching road at this intersection; eastbound traffic on former Highway 503 defaults onto Highway 121.

== History ==
In 1956, thousands of kilometres of roads were assumed by the Department of Highways (DHO), predecessor to the modern Ministry of Transportation (MTO), as Secondary Highways. These routes were designated because they formed important links with more significant King's Highways. On May 9, 1956, the DHO designated 75.7 km (47.0 mi) of roads between Highway 46 in Kirkfield and Highway 121 in Kinmount, via Sebright and Norland, as Highway 503. Highway 500 was designated the same day between Bobcaygeon and east of Bancroft via Kinmount; 40.1 km (24.9 mi) of it between Kinmount and Tory Hill would eventually become Highway 503.^{[map1][map2]}

Between Sebright and Tory Hill, the highway followed the historic Monck Colonization Road. It was paved through Norland as well as between west of Kinmount and Irondale, but was otherwise a gravel road in 1956. By 1958 it had been paved north of Kirkfield to modern Kawartha Lakes City Road 33 (Centennial Park Road) as well as 11 km (7 mi) east from Sebright. The following year, Highway 500 was paved between Irondale and Tory Hill. In 1961, a bypass to the north of Irondale opened, and Highway 503 was paved from east of Sebright to Uphill.

On March 1, 1964, several highways in the Haliburton and Bancroft area were renumbered in an effort to simplify the road network. Among the changes was renumbering Highway 500 between Kinmount and Tory Hill as part of Highway 503. This brought it to its peak length of 116.8 km (72.6 mi) and established the route it would follow until it was decommissioned in the late 1990s. The remaining unpaved sections were 16 km (10 mi) south of Sebright, approximately 14 km (9 mi) east of Uphill, and approximately 14 km between Norland and Kinmount. The latter two were paved between 1965 and 1969, while the former was paved south of Dalrymple in 1972 and between Dalrymple and Sebright by 1977.

As part of a series of budget cuts initiated by premier Mike Harris under his Common Sense Revolution platform in 1995, numerous highways deemed to no longer be of significance to the provincial network were decommissioned and responsibility for the routes transferred to a lower level of government, a process referred to as downloading. The entire length of Highway 503 was downloaded in 1997 and 1998, making it the longest highway decommissioned entirely during the process. On April 1, 1997, the eastern 32.9 km (20.4 mi) of the route, between White Boundary Road at the Peterborough–Haliburton county boundary and Tory Hill, was transferred to Haliburton County. The remainder of the route was transferred to Victoria County and Peterborough County on January 1, 1998. Within Peterborough and Haliburton counties, the former highway is designated as County Road 503. Victoria County was restructured as the city of Kawartha Lakes on January 1, 2001; the portion of the former highway within it is designated as City Road 6 between Kirkfield and Sebright, and as City Road 45 between Sebright and Kinmount.

== Major intersections ==
A map of Kawartha Lakes, with City Road 45 highlighted in orange. City Road 45 formed part of Highway 503.

The following table lists the major junctions along Highway 503, as noted by the Ministry of Transportation of Ontario. Distances and junctions are listed according to the 1989 MTO Provincial Highway Distance Tables.

Division	Location	km	mi	Destinations	Notes
Victoria County	Kirkfield	0.0	0.0	Highway 48 – Beaverton, Coboconk	
Victoria County	Dalrymple	16.6	10.3	Lake Dalrymple Road	
Victoria County		20.1	12.5	County Road 46	
Victoria County	Sebright	25.9	16.1	County Road 45 (Monck Road)	Highway 503 switches from South–North to West–East
Victoria County	Uphill	41.3	25.7	Highway 505 (Victoria Road)	Victoria Road historic colonization trail
Victoria County		51.6	32.1		
Victoria County	Norland	60.6	37.7	Highway 35 – Minden, Lindsay	
Victoria County	Dongola	65.7	40.8		
Victoria County	Kinmount	76.0	47.2	Road 121	Beginning of concurrency with Highway 121
Victoria County	Kinmount	76.2	47.3	Road 121 (Lindsay Street)	End of concurrency with Highway 121
Victoria County	Kinmount	76.3	47.4	Bobcaygeon Road	Bobcaygeon historic colonization trail
Haliburton	Furnace Falls	85.4	53.1	Furnace Falls Bridge over the Irondale River	
Haliburton	Gooderham	102.9	63.9	County Road 3 (Glamorgan Road) – Haliburton Village	
Haliburton	Gooderham	104.6	65.0	Highway 507 – Catchacoma	
Haliburton	Tory Hill	116.8	72.6	Highway 121 – Cardiff, Haliburton Village	
1.000 mi = 1.609 km; 1.000 km = 0.621 mi
