= Ontario Highway 121 =

Former Ontario provincial highway

Highway 121

Route information
- Maintained by the Ministry of Transportation of Ontario
- Length: 133.7 km (83.1 mi)
- Existed: May 25, 1955–May 2003

Major junctions
- South end: Highway 35 at Powles Corners
- Highway 35A in Fenelon Falls; Highway 503 in Kinmount; Highway 35 in Minden; Highway 118 west in Haliburton Village; Highway 503 west in Tory Hill
- East end: Highway 28 in Paudash

Location
- Country: Canada
- Province: Ontario
- Towns: Fenelon Falls, Minden, Haliburton Village
- Villages: Burnt River, Kinmount, Essonville, Tory Hill, Cheddar, Cardiff, Paudash

Highway system
- Ontario provincial highways; Current; Former; 400-series
← Highway 118	→ Highway 124
Former provincial highways
← Highway 120	Highway 122 →

King's Highway 121, commonly referred to as Highway 121, was a provincially maintained highway in the Canadian province of Ontario that connected several communities in the cottage country region of Central Ontario on the southern edge of the Canadian Shield. Between Fenelon Falls and Minden, Highway 121 served as an alternative route to Highway 35, which was severely congested during summer weekends. From Minden, the highway branched east to Haliburton Village and thereafter followed the present route of Highway 118 to Highway 28 in Paudash.

Highway 121 was established in 1955, connecting to Highway 35 near Fenelon Falls and Minden. It was extended to Tory Hill via Haliburton Village the following year. 1956 also saw the discovery of significant uranium deposits in the Bancroft area, prompting the Department of Highways to construct a new east–west route, Highway 109. It was built to connect Highway 503 (then 500) at Tory Hill with Highway 28 near Paudash; however, in 1964 it would be absorbed into the routing of Highway 121, bringing the highway to its maximum length of 133.7 kilometres (83.1 mi).

The route remained unchanged until the mid-1990s, when government cutbacks led to a mass transferring—or downloading—of a significant portion of the provincial highway network. In 1997, Highway 121 was downloaded between its southern terminus and the community of Fell, north of Fenelon Falls, as well as from north of Kinmount to Highway 35 in Minden. The section between Fell and Kinmount as well as between Highway 35 and the eastern terminus of Highway 118 was downloaded in 1998, resulting in a common terminus with the latter. This was rectified in 2003 by renumbering the remaining length of Highway 121 as an eastern extension of Highway 118.

== Route description ==
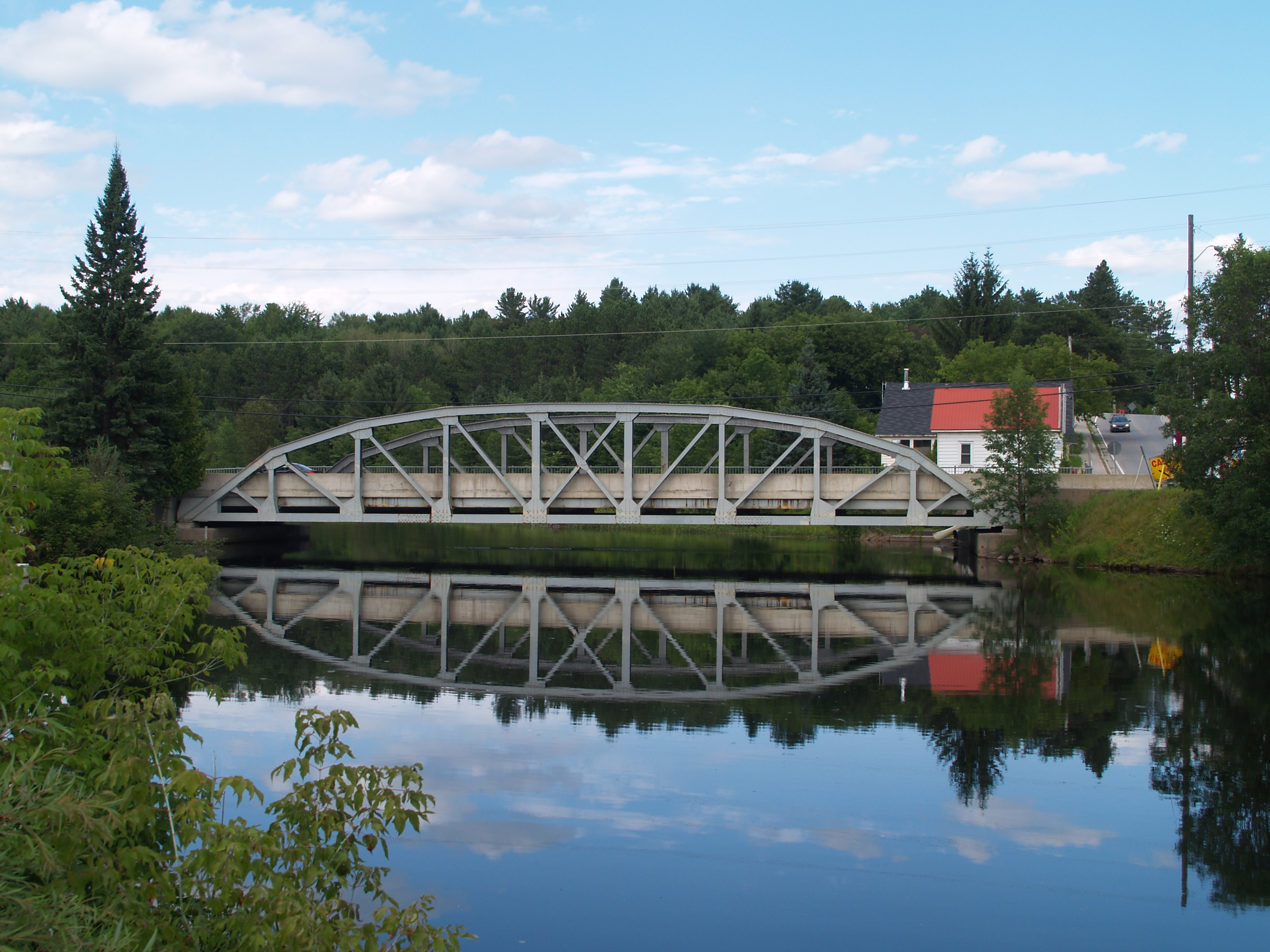
Crossing the Burnt River in Kinmount. The steel arch bridge has been rebuilt many times, but retains its historic charm.

Highway 121 was a 133.7 km (83.1 mi) route that connected several communities through southcentral Ontario. As it exists today, the former routing begins in the City of Kawartha Lakes at a junction with Highway 35 north of the village of Cameron. It angles northeast as Kawartha Lakes Road 121, travelling through farmland for 5.6 km (3.5 mi) before entering Fenelon Falls, a town centred on a lock on the Trent–Severn Waterway. Within Fenelon Falls, Kawartha Lakes Road 8 and Road 121 travel concurrently for 1.9 km (1.2 mi), crossing the waterway and passing through the downtown area before curving east and exiting the town.

At Northline Road, Kawartha Lakes Road 8 branches to the south, while former Highway 121 curves northeast, then north between Concession I and II of Verulam Township to Fell, at the northern boundary of the township. From here it veers east, then north between lots 18 and 19 of concession I in Somerville Township. The road winds north-east alongside the former Victoria Railway and the Burnt River to the village of the same name, which it bypasses to the southeast. At Somerville Sixth Concession (Hillside Drive, now Kawartha Lakes Road 44), the route again assumes and eastward direction. It turns north and follows the Bobcaygeon Road along the eastern boundary of Kawartha Lakes, north through Kinmount and into Haliburton County.

From the Haliburton–Kawartha Lakes boundary, the route continues north along the Bobcaygeon Road into the undulating Canadian Shield as Haliburton County Road 121 to meet with Highway 35 immediately south of the town of Minden. The two highways travel concurrently along a bypass on the eastern edge of the town. Immediately south of the Gull River crossing, the route diverges east from Highway 35 as Haliburton County Road 21. Throughout the 23 km (14 mi) distance between Minden and Haliburton Village, the highway serves cottages along the northern shore of Kashagawigamog Lake.

In Haliburton, the route encounters Highway 118, which continues east along what was formerly Highway 121 until early 2003. The route passes through a lake-dotted region to Tory Hill, where it encounters the Monck Road (formerly Highway 503), which provides a shorter route between there and Kinmount. Nearly 4 km (2.5 mi) to the east, drivers must turn to remain on the route, as the mainline continues north into Wilberforce as former Highway 648. The highway continues east, now following the Monck Road, through the communities of Cheddar and Cardiff. At the latter, the Monck Road departs to the northeast, while the highway continues east to Paudash, where it ends at Highway 28.

== History ==
Highway 121 was first established in 1955, connecting to Highway 35 at both ends. In the south, the new route began at Powles Corners, and in the north it ended south of Minden, a distance of 56.2 km (34.9 mi). This segment of the route was assumed by the Department of Highways (DHO) on May 25, 1955, the same day that Highway 35 was rerouted along the Fenelon Falls Bypass; the former route of Highway 35 into Fenelon Falls became Highway 121 and Highway 35A. The following spring, the route was extended east to a junction with the newly designated Highway 500 in Tory Hill. A short concurrency with Highway 35 was established around the east side of Minden. The DHO assumed this segment on March 7, 1956, extending Highway 121 to a length of 107.2 km (66.6 mi).

During the mid-1950s, large Uranium deposits were discovered in the hills west of Bancroft. The area experienced a boom between 1956 and 1964, prompting the DHO to construct two new highways east from Highway 28. One of these was Highway 109, which was designated (reusing the short-lived 109 numbering formerly on Eglinton Avenue in Scarborough) then constructed over the next couple years. Highway 109 was designated on March 20, 1958, from Paudash to the Monck Road west of Cardiff. It was extended further west on June 26 and September 25 by 16.5 km (10.3 mi) to meet with Highway 500, which later became Highway 648, south of Wilberforce. On March 1, 1964, Highway 121 was extended east to Highway 28 at Paudash, absorbing the length of Highway 500 from Tory Hill to the Highway 109 junction, as well as the entire length of Highway 109. This brought Highway 121 to its maximum length of 133.7 kilometres (83.1 mi); it remained this way until the late 1990s.

As part of a series of budget cuts initiated by premier Mike Harris under his Common Sense Revolution platform in 1995, numerous highways deemed to no longer be of significance to the provincial network were decommissioned and responsibility for the routes transferred to a lower level of government, a process referred to as downloading. On April 1, 1997, sections of Highway 121 between Cameron and Fell (near Fenelon Falls) and between Kinmount and Minden were transferred to the jurisdiction of Victoria County (now the City of Kawartha Lakes) and Haliburton County. Further downloads were performed on January 1, 1998, transferring the sections between Fell and Kinmount as well as between Minden and Haliburton Village. This resulted in Highway 118 and Highway 121 sharing a common terminus. The remainder of the route from Haliburton to Cardiff was renumbered as part of Highway 118 on May 1, 2003

Today, the former route of Highway 121 is known by various designations: Kawartha Lakes Road 121 in Kawartha Lakes, Haliburton Highlands Road 121 in Haliburton County south of Minden, Haliburton Highlands Road 21 between Minden and Haliburton Village, and Highway 118 between Haliburton village and Cardiff.

== Major intersections ==
A map of Kawartha Lakes, with route 121 highlighted in orange. (Click to enlarge)

The following table lists the major junctions along Highway 121, as noted by the Ministry of Transportation of Ontario.

Division	Location	km	mi	Destinations	Notes
Kawartha Lakes	Powles Corners	0.0	0.0	Highway 35	Southern terminus of Kawartha Lakes Road 121
Kawartha Lakes	Fenelon Falls	5.6	3.5	West Street South	Kawartha Lakes Road 121 is known as Lindsay Street north-east of this junction
Kawartha Lakes	Fenelon Falls	6.3	3.9	Road 8 (formerly Highway 35A)	Kawartha Lakes Roads 8 and 121 travel concurrently for the next 1.9 kilometres. The roads are known as Helen Street north-east of this junction.
Kawartha Lakes	Fenelon Falls	6.6	4.1	Road 22 (Francis Street)	
Kawartha Lakes	Fenelon Falls	7.4	4.6	Princess Street	
Kawartha Lakes		8.0	5.0	Road 8 (Northline Road)	End of designation of Short Street; end of Kawartha Lakes Road 8 concurrency
Kawartha Lakes	Fell	15.1	9.4	Road 37 (Burys Green Road)	Formerly Victoria Road 36
Kawartha Lakes	Burnt River	22.5	14.0	Road 44 (Burnt River Road)	
Kawartha Lakes	Burnt River	25.1	15.6	Road 44 (Hillside Drive)	
Kawartha Lakes		30.7	19.1	Road 49 (Bobcaygeon Road)	Former Secondary Highway 649. Kawartha Lakes Road 121 follows the Bobcaygeon Road north of this junction.
Kawartha Lakes	Kinmount	40.4	25.1	Road 45 (Monck Road)	Kawartha Lakes Roads 45 and 121 run concurrent for the next 200 metres.
Kawartha Lakes	Kinmount	40.6	25.2	Road 45 (Monck Road)	End of concurrency with Kawartha Lakes Road 45
Kawartha Lakes	Kinmount	41.9	26.0	Boundary Road	Northern terminus of Kawartha Lakes Road 121. Road continues north as Haliburton County Road 121
Haliburton	Minden Hills	48.1	29.9	County Road 1 north (Gelert Road)	
Haliburton	Minden Hills	56.2	34.9	Highway 35 south – Coboconk, Lindsay	Beginning of Highway 35 concurrency
Haliburton	Minden Hills	58.6	36.4	County Road 16 (South Lake Road)	
Haliburton	Minden Hills	60.7	37.7	Highway 35 north – Carnarvon, Dorset	End of Highway 35 concurrency
Haliburton	Minden Hills	68.1	42.3	County Road 18 (Ingoldsby Road) – Ingoldsby	
Haliburton	Minden Hills	73.4	45.6	Allsaw Bridge	
Haliburton	Haliburton Village	82.8	51.4	County Road 1 south (Gelert Road)	
Haliburton	Haliburton Village	83.8	52.1	Highway 118 west	Eastern terminus of Highway 118 until May 2003; Western terminus of Highway 121 between January 1, 1998 and May 2003
Haliburton		88.3	54.9	County Road 3 south (Glamorgan Road) – Gooderham	
Haliburton		91.6	56.9	Kennaway Road – Kennaway	
Haliburton	Essonville	102.1	63.4	County Road 4 east (Essonville Line)	
Haliburton	Tory Hill	107.2	66.6	Highway 503 – Gooderham, Kinmount	
Haliburton	Highlands East	111.0	69.0	Highway 648 (Wilberforce Road)	
Haliburton	Highlands East	120.7	75.0	Highway 648 (Dyno Mines Road)	
Haliburton	Highlands East	122.5	76.1	Highway 648 (Highland Grove Road)	
Haliburton	Highlands East	128.9	80.1	County Road 9	
Hastings	Paudash	133.7	83.1	Highway 28	
1.000 mi = 1.609 km; 1.000 km = 0.621 mi
