= Ontario Highway 649 =

Former Ontario provincial highway

Highway 649

Route information
- Maintained by city of Kawartha Lakes
- Length: 18.0 km (11.2 mi)
- Existed: 1956 (as Highway 500)–January 1, 1998

Major junctions
- North end: Highway 36 (Main Street) in Bobcaygeon
- Road 37
- South end: Highway 121 – Kinmount

Location
- Country: Canada
- Province: Ontario
- Counties: Kawartha Lakes, Peterborough (road lies on boundary between counties)
- Villages: Bobcaygeon

Highway system
- Ontario provincial highways; Current; Former; 400-series
← Highway 647	→ Highway 650

Secondary Highway 649, commonly referred to as Highway 649, was a provincially maintained secondary highway in the Canadian province of Ontario. Now known as Kawartha Lakes Road 49, and locally as East Street North in Bobcaygeon, it is a municipally-maintained class-3 roadway (with the exception of a 0.4-kilometre (0.2 mi) class-4 section at the southern end) located mostly along the boundary between the city of Kawartha Lakes and Peterborough County. The 18-kilometre-long (11 mi) route begins in Bobcaygeon at a junction with former Highway 36, and proceeds north along the boundary between Kawartha Lakes and Peterborough County to a junction with former Highway 121 just south of Kinmount.

The route was designated as Highway 500 in 1956. A major renumbering resulted in it becoming Highway 649 in 1964. The route remained generally unchanged until it was decommissioned and transferred to Victoria County at the beginning of 1998; it then became Victoria County Road 49. In 2001, Victoria County was restructured as the City of Kawartha Lakes, but the road retained the same number.

== Route description ==
Former Highway 649, now known as Kawartha Lakes Road 49, runs in a predominantly north–south direction and covers a distance of 18.0 km (11.2 mi). The road crosses primarily rural geography between its southern terminus, City Road 36 (Main Street), former Highway 36, and northern terminus, City Road 121, former Highway 121. The village of Bobcaygeon at its southern terminus is an exception, and the village of Kinmount lies a short distance north of the route. The road crosses the boundary between the Ordovician limestone to the south and the granite Canadian Shield to the north, resulting in a hilly landscape with many large rock outcroppings.

== History ==
The road that is now Kawartha Lakes Road 49 started in 1853, when an act of parliament set forth the building of colonization roads into what was then the frontier of Upper Canada. One of the first of these roads was named the Bobcaygeon Road, after the village at its southern end. In 1956, the southern portion of the Bobcaygeon Road through Minden was assumed by the Department of Highways (DHO), predecessor to the modern Ministry of Transportation, and numbered as Highway 500. Highway 121 was also opened along the Bobcaygeon Road that year, from south of Kinmount to Minden.

On March 1, 1964, a major renumbering took place in the Kawartha – Haliburton – Peterborough area, which resulted in Highway 500 being renumbered as Highway 649. The road held this designation until January 1, 1998, when the entirety of Highway 649 was decommissioned and transferred to Victoria County, which designated it as Victoria County 49. In 2001, Victoria County was restructured as the city of Kawartha Lakes, and the road was renamed Kawartha Lakes Road 49, which it remains known as today.

== Major intersections ==
A map of Kawartha Lakes, with route 49 highlighted in orange (right-click map to enlarge).

The following table lists the major junctions along Highway 649. The entire route is located in Kawartha Lakes.

Location	km	mi	Destinations	Notes
Bobcaygeon	0.0	0.0	Road 36 (Main Street)	Southern terminus of highway; the road continues south as Road 36
	9.7	6.0	Road 37 (Burys Green Road)	
	18.0	11.2	Road 121	Northern terminus of highway
1.000 mi = 1.609 km; 1.000 km = 0.621 mi

== See also ==
List of numbered roads in Kawartha Lakes, Ontario
