= Kirkfield =

Village in Ontario, Canada

Coordinates: 44°33′45″N 78°58′45″W

Kirkfield is a village located in the city of Kawartha Lakes, in the Canadian province of Ontario. The unincorporated village was named in 1864 after the initial name, Novar, was rejected by the government. A list of 8 possible choices was then offered. The village, being predominantly Scottish at the time, chose Kirkfield, after Kirk' o' Field in Edinburgh. It is home to Lock 36 of the Trent-Severn Waterway, a hydraulic lift lock which connects Canal Lake and the artificially flooded Mitchell Lake. Travellers and commuters pass through Kirkfield regularly while travelling on Highway 48 (Now Portage Road) west towards Highway 12 and east towards Highway 35.

The village of Kirkfield is located north-northwest of Lindsay at the junction of Kawartha Lakes Road 48 and Kawartha Lakes Road 6 (Formerly highways 48 and 503, respectively).

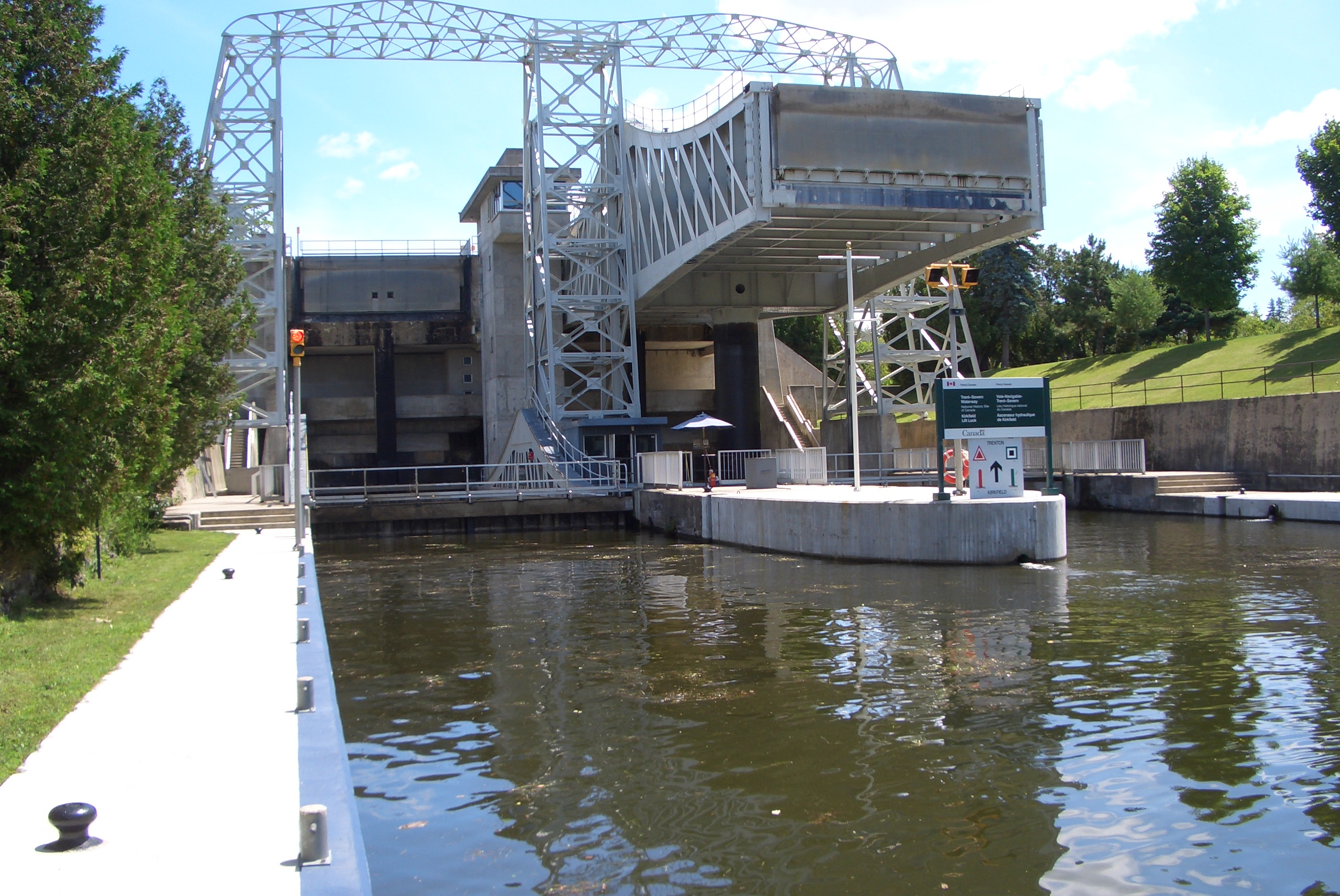
Kirkfield Lift Lock

Kirkfield is the birthplace of Canadian railway, transit, and electrical entrepreneur William Mackenzie. His railway, the Canadian Northern Railway, was Canada's second transcontinental, begun in 1895 and opened in 1915. It went bankrupt during World War I, but when combined with other bankrupt companies such as the Grand Trunk Railway it became the basis for Canadian National Railways in 1923. Mackenzie learned how to become a railway contractor when the Toronto and Nipissing Railway came through Kirkfield, opening in 1871. He was also a contractor for the Canadian Pacific Railway in the Rocky Mountains. He brought with him a group of Kirkfield labourers who were called the Eldon Reserve, and they were so faithful to him, they did not strike with other contractors when the CPR ran out of money several times. He also became head of the Toronto Railway Company in 1891, and brought the first electric streetcar service to Toronto in 1893. When later combined with other streetcar companies such as the Toronto Civic Railways, the Toronto and York Radial Railway and the Toronto Suburban Railway, the TRC became the basis for the Toronto Transit Commission in 1921. He also pioneered power generation at Niagara Falls, and headed EDCO, the Electrical Development Company of Ontario. Adam Beck was a continual critic of Mackenzie and his companies, and eventually forced EDCO to become part of giant Ontario Hydro.

The Sir William Mackenzie Inn, built in 1888 and rumoured to be haunted, is located in Kirkfield. Several other homes in Kirkfield were built by Mackenzie for family members.

Kirkfield's Lock 36 is a 15-metre-high hydraulic liftlock constructed between 1896 and 1907. Additional construction of an updated electrical and hydraulic system was completed between 1965 and 1966. It is the second highest lift lock in Canada.

Kirkfield was the childhood home of businessman Pat Burns, who went started the Calgary Stampede and built one of largest meat packing and ranching empires in the world.

Education in the village is through Lady Mackenzie Public School, which serves an average of about 450 students, with 25 staff and faculty.
