= List of numbered roads in Kawartha Lakes =

Roads in area of Ontario, Canada

A map of Kawartha Lakes. King's Highways are labelled, while city roads are represented by black lines.

The numbered roads in Kawartha Lakes account for 650 kilometres (403.9 mi) of roads in the Canadian province of Ontario. (Note: The total length only counts concurrent sections of roadways once.) These roads (Note: In Ontario, all roads are legally known as highways. However, road is the more prevalent term for common use. The Ontario Municipal Act defines a highway as any road, street or bridge that is not a Provincial Highway.) include King's Highways that are signed and maintained by the province, as well as the county roads under the jurisdiction of the County of Bruce. The third type of existing roadway in the single-tier municipality of Kawartha Lakes is locally maintained roads also called concession roads and sidelines, which are beyond the scope of this article. A fourth category of roads, secondary highways, have not existed within the region since 1998.

The 49 numbered routes provide year-round access to the mostly rural municipality. The longest of these roads is Highway 35, which stretches 88.9 kilometres (55.2 mi) across the Bruce Peninsula from Hepworth, Ontario to Tobermory. The shortest numbered road is Kawartha Lakes Road 3, Hartley Road, a causeway just less than a kilometre long crossing Mitchell Lake.

Before 1998, several additional King's Highways and secondary highways were located in what was then known as Victoria County. These were transferred to the county in 1998. All county roads, including the former provincial highways, were renamed when Victoria County was abolished in 2001 and replaced with the City of Kawartha Lakes.

== Types of roads ==
A marker for Highway 35 and Highway 7 / The Trans-Canada Highway, which run concurrently near Lindsay

=== King's Highways ===
There are 168.0 kilometres (104.4 mi) of provincially maintained highways, (Note: There are 2.2 km (1.4 mi) of concurrent King's Highway, comprising Highway 35 and Highway 7A for 1.5 km (0.93 mi) and Highway 35 and Highway 7B for 0.7 km (0.43 mi). This means that the total of all the King's Highways is 170.2 kilometres (105.8 mi).) termed "provincial highways" or "King's Highways" (a term adopted in 1930).

As in the rest of Ontario, the provincially maintained highways in Kawartha Lakes are designated with a shield-shaped sign topped with a crown. The highway number is in the centre, with the word ONTARIO below. These signs are known as shields, but may be referred to as reassurance markers. Highway 7, which is part of the Trans-Canada Highway, is also marked with a green maple leaf shield. Highways 7 and 35 together measure 140.0 km (87.0 mi) and account for 82.3% of the length of highways. The remaining 30.2 km (18.8 mi) comprises Highway 115, a controlled-access freeway in the southern corner of the city; Highway 7A, an alternate route to Highway 7 around the Lindsay area; and Highway 7B, a business route through Lindsay.

Provincially maintained highways generally have greater construction standards than municipally or locally maintained roads. Although they are usually one lane in either direction, several short sections with two lanes in one direction as a passing lane exist along the highways. The municipality's lone freeway, Highway 115, is two lanes in either direction for its entire length. There are two off ramps with Highway 115 in the region: One with Road 20 (Boundary Road) at the southern boundary with Durham Region; and the other one with Road 32 (Porter Road) at Road 12 (Pontypool Road) at the eastern boundary with Peterborough County.

=== City roads ===
There are 44 numbered city roads in Kawartha Lakes. Kawartha Lakes city roads are signed with a flowerpot-shaped sign, as are most regional and county roads in Ontario. The road number appears in the centre of the sign, with the word KAWARTHA above and the word LAKES below. Like King's Highways, these signs are known as shields. The total length of city roads is 739.3 kilometres (459.4 mi). (Note: There are 4.0 km (2.5 mi) of concurrent roadway. Routes 6 and 9 share 0.5 km (0.31 mi), 8 and 121 share 1.9 km (1.2 mi), 9 and 46 share 0.3 km (0.19 mi), 10 and 14 share 1.1 km (0.68 mi), and 45 and 121 share 0.2 km (0.12 mi). This means that the total of all the route lengths is 743.3 kilometres (461.9 mi).)

== History ==
Hartley Road (Kawartha Lakes Road 3) crossing Mitchell Lake

The City of Kawartha Lakes was formed on January 1, 2001, and was known as Victoria County before that. Alongside this change, all Victoria County Roads received Kawartha Lakes Road designations, with unchanged numbers, and many new routes were established.

Prior to 1998, Victoria County contained twelve King's Highways. As part of a province-wide transfer of highways to municipal governments, known as downloading, seven were given new Victoria County designations following the prior provincial designations. The exceptions are Highway 35A which was renumbered to fill a gap in the route of Victoria County Road 8, and Highway 36B which was given the new designation of Victoria County Road 17.

The downloaded highways comprises Highway 35A, which was designated Victoria County Road 8; Highway 35B, incorporated into Highway 7B and Victoria County Road 15; Highway 36, designated as Victoria County Road 36; Highway 36B, designated as Victoria County Road 17; Highway 46, designated as Victoria County Road 46; Highway 48, designated as Victoria County Road 48; and Highway 121, designated as Victoria County Road 121.

Highway 7B was also shortened by several kilometres, and now only consists of the portion along Kent Street in Lindsay.

=== Secondary Highways ===
Three secondary highways, which existed in Victoria County prior to 1998, were also downloaded from the province to the county, and given new designations in addition to the downloading of King's Highways:

- Highway 503, which ran from Kirkfield to Kinmount, was renumbered as an extension of Victoria County Road 6 (Kirkfield to Sebright) and Victoria County Road 45 (Sebright to Kinmount).
- Highway 505, which ran from Highway 48 near Victoria Road to Highway 503 in Uphill, was renumbered as an extension of Victoria County Road 35.
- Highway 649, which ran from Bobcaygeon north to Highway 121, was renumbered as Victoria County Road 49.

== King's Highways ==
The following is a list of provincially maintained highways in Kawartha Lakes. Communities are ordered by where the route encounters them (either from south to north or from west to east).

| Route | Length | | Western/Southern Terminus | Eastern/Northern Terminus | Communities | Comments |
| Route | km | mi | Western/Southern Terminus | Eastern/Northern Terminus | Communities | Comments |
|---|---|---|---|---|---|---|
| Highway 7 | 53.3 | 33.1 | Kawartha Lakes Road 2 | Hayes Line | Manilla, Oakwood, Lindsay, Reaboro, Omemee | Part of the Trans-Canada Highway |
| Highway 7A | 18.4 | 11.4 | Kawartha Lakes–Durham Region Boundary | Dranoel Road | Bethany | |
| Highway 7B | 3.4 | 2.1 | Highway 7 | Kawartha Lakes Road 15 | Lindsay | Highway 7B and Highway 35B followed the same course, prior to the former being shortened to its current length, and the latter downloaded, in 1998; also known as Kent Street West |
| Highway 35 | 86.7 | 53.9 | Boundary Road | Laxton–Lutterworth Boundary Road | Lindsay, Cameron, Rosedale, Coboconk, Norland | |
| Highway 115 | 8.4 | 5.2 | Boundary Road | Glamorgan Road | | Only freeway in the region |
Note: All King's Highways, with the exception of 7B, continue in both directions into neighbouring counties and regions.

== City roads ==
The following is a list of the numbered city roads maintained by the City of Kawartha Lakes. Communities are ordered by where the route encounters them (either from south to north or from west to east).

| Route | Name(s) | Length | | Western/Southern Terminus | Eastern/Northern Terminus | Communities | Comments |
| Route | Name(s) | km | mi | Western/Southern Terminus | Eastern/Northern Terminus | Communities | Comments |
|---|---|---|---|---|---|---|---|
| Kawartha Lakes Road 2 | Simcoe Street | 20.7 | 12.9 | High Park Road | Road 9 (Woodville Road) | Seagrave, Sonya, Manilla | Signed and maintained by both the City of Kawartha Lakes and the Regional Municipality of Durham north of Seagrave |
| Kawartha Lakes Road 3 | Hartley Road | 0.9 | 0.56 | Road 48 (Portage Road) | Robinson Avenue | Victoria Road | Shortest city road in Kawartha Lakes |
| Kawartha Lakes Road 4 | Little Britain Road, Angeline Street, Thunder Bridge Road | 32.1 | 19.9 | Road 2 (Simcoe Street) | Road 18 (Elm Tree Road) | Little Britain, Lindsay | |
| Kawartha Lakes Road 5 | Janetville Road | 7.3 | 4.5 | Highway 7A | Road 57 (Golf Course Road) | Janetville | |
| Kawartha Lakes Road 6 | Eldon Road, Kirkfield Road, Sadowa Road, Chisholm Trail, Black River Road | 78.8 | 49.0 | Road 28 (Ramsey Road) | County Road 52 (Coopers Falls Road) | Little Britain, Oakwood, Kirkfield, Sebright, Sadowa | Prior to 1998, a segment was designated as Highway 503; concurrent with City Road 9 for 0.5 km (0.31 mi) |
| Kawartha Lakes Road 7 | Sturgeon Road, Thurstonia Road | 22.4 | 13.9 | Highway 7 (King Street) | Hazel Street (Sturgeon Lake) | Omemee, Downeyville, Dunsford | Ends at Sturgeon Lake, turning west and becoming Hazel Street |
| Kawartha Lakes Road 8 | Glenarm Road, Victoria Road, Helen Street, Colborne Street, North Street, Duke Street | 46.0 | 28.6 | Road 2 (Simcoe Street) | Road 36 (East Street North) | Argyle, Glenarm, Fenelon Falls, Bobcaygeon | Previously numbered as Highway 35A between Highway 35 and former Highway 121, prior to 1998; continues westward as Regional Road 15; concurrent with Highway 35 for 1.9 km (1.2 mi) |
| Kawartha Lakes Road 9 | Woodville Road, King Street, Cambray Road | 22.1 | 13.7 | Road 2 (Simcoe Street) | Highway 35 | Woodville, Cambray | Concurrent with City Road 6 for 0.5 km (0.31 mi); concurrent with City Road 46 for 0.3 km (0.19 mi) |
| Kawartha Lakes Road 10 | Emily Park Road, Centreline Road | 15.5 | 9.6 | Hayes Line | Road 17 (Pigeon Lake Road) | Emily | Continues southward as County Road 10; concurrent with City Road 17 for 1.1 km (0.68 mi) |
| Kawartha Lakes Road 11 | Pleasant Point Road | 2.8 | 1.7 | Road 36 | Sturgeon Lake | Pleasant Point | Ends at a dead end at the shores of Sturgeon Lake |
| Kawartha Lakes Road 12 | Pontypool Road | 9.3 | 5.8 | Highway 35 | Glamorgan Road | Pontypool | Continues eastward as County Road 21 |
| Kawartha Lakes Road 14 | Peace Road, Yankee Line | 11.3 | 7.0 | Road 7 (Sturgeon Road) | Boundary Road | Emily | Continues eastward as County Road 14 |
| Kawartha Lakes Road 15 | Lindsay Street | 3.3 | 2.1 | Highway 7 / Highway 35 | Road 17 (Wellington Street, Queen Street) | Lindsay | Lindsay Street is the east–west divider for Lindsay, so many streets (including its terminus) are named differently on either side |
| Kawartha Lakes Road 16 | Ogemah Road, Cottage Road | 4.3 | 2.7 | Washburn Island Road | Road 28 (Ramsey Road) | | |
| Kawartha Lakes Road 17 | Colborne Street, William Street, Wellington Street, Lindsay Street, Verulam Street, Pigeon Lake Road | 36.1 | 22.4 | Highway 35 | Road 36 | Lindsay | Concurrent with City Road 10 for 1.1 km (0.68 mi); formerly Highway 36B within Lindsay |
| Kawartha Lakes Road 18 | Elm Tree Road | 20.9 | 13.0 | Road 28 (Valentia Road) | Road 9 (Cambray Road) | Valentia, Cambray | Shares its southern/western terminus with the southern/eastern terminus of City Road 28 |
| Kawartha Lakes Road 19 | Mary Street | 1.4 | 0.87 | Road 4 (Angeline Street South) | Road 15 (Lindsay Street South) | Lindsay | |
| Kawartha Lakes Road 20 | Boundary Road | 7.6 | 4.7 | Darlington–Manvers Townline Road | Highway 115 | | Follows the southern boundary of Kawartha Lakes; continues westward as Regional Road 20 |
| Kawartha Lakes Road 21 | Killarney Bay Road | 11.0 | 6.8 | Highway 35 | Road 8 (Glenarm Road) | | |
| Kawartha Lakes Road 22 | Francis Street East | 2.3 | 1.4 | River Drive | Road 8 Road 121 (Colborne Street) | Fenelon Falls | |
| Kawartha Lakes Road 24 | Park Street, King Street | 13.0 | 8.1 | Road 36 | Road 36 (East Street South) | Dunsford, Bobcaygeon | |
| Kawartha Lakes Road 25 | Sturgeon Point Road | 7.8 | 4.8 | Irene Avenue | Road 8 | Sturgeon Point | |
| Kawartha Lakes Road 26 | Frank Hill Road | 6.3 | 3.9 | Highway 7 | Road 14 (Yankee Line) | Fowlers Corners | |
| Kawartha Lakes Road 28 | Ramsey Road, Valentia Road | 13.6 | 8.5 | Road 2 (Simcoe Street) | Road 18 (Elm Tree Road) | Valentia | City Road 28 shares its southern/eastern terminus with the southern/western terminus of City Road 18 |
| Kawartha Lakes Road 30 | Blythe Shore Road | 6.0 | 3.7 | Road 25 (Sturgeon Point Road) | Road 8 | | |
| Kawartha Lakes Road 31 | Mount Horeb Road | 11.4 | 7.1 | Highway 35 | Highway 7 | Omemee | |
| Kawartha Lakes Road 32 | Porter Road | 7.7 | 4.8 | Highway 115 | Highway 7A | Manvers | |
| Kawartha Lakes Road 33 | Centennial Park Road | 6.7 | 4.2 | Road 48 (Portage Road) | Road 6 (Kirkfield Road) | Rohallion | |
| Kawartha Lakes Road 34 | Long Beach Road, Cameron Road | 12.3 | 7.6 | Manor Road (Sturgeon Lake) | Road 8 (Glenarm Road) | Long Beach, Cameron | |
| Kawartha Lakes Road 35 | Fennel Road, Victoria Road | 30.5 | 19.0 | Road 8 (Glenarm Road) | Road 45 (Monck Road) | Glenarm, Victoria Road, Uphill | The northern 19.1 km (11.9 mi) were designated as Highway 505, prior to 1997 |
| Kawartha Lakes Road 36 | Verulam Road, East Street | 36.2 | 22.5 | Highway 7 | Road 49 (Main Street) | Lindsay, Dunsford, Bobcaygeon | Formerly Highway 36, prior to 1997; continues eastward as County Road 36 |
| Kawartha Lakes Road 37 | Bury's Green Road | 11.2 | 7.0 | Road 121 | Road 49 | Fell Station, Bury's Green | Formerly Victoria County Road 36, prior to 1998; renumbered Victoria County Road 37 by 1999 |
| Kawartha Lakes Road 38 | Ski Hill Road | 13.6 | 8.5 | Highway 7A | Highway 7 (King Street West) | Bethany, Franklin, Omemee | |
| Kawartha Lakes Road 41 | Bexley–Laxton Township Line | 12.1 | 7.5 | Road 48 (Portage Road) | Road 45 (Monck Road) | Corsons, Bexley | |
| Kawartha Lakes Road 42 | Base Line Road | 11.4 | 7.1 | Highway 35 (Main Street) | Road 45 (Monck Road) | Coboconk, Dongola | |
| Kawartha Lakes Road 43 | 6th Concession Road, Northline Road, 7th Concession Road | 9.6 | 6.0 | Highway 35 | Road 44 (Burnt River Road) | Coboconk, Burnt River | |
| Kawartha Lakes Road 44 | Burnt River Road, Hillside Drive | 3.9 | 2.4 | Road 121 | Road 121 | Burnt River | A short bypass of City Road 121 through the village of Burnt River |
| Kawartha Lakes Road 45 | Monck Road | 50.0 | 31.1 | Road 6 (Kirkfield Road) | Bobcaygeon Road | Sebright, Ragged Rapids, Uphill, Norland, Dongola, Kinmount | Formerly Highway 503, prior to 1997; continues westward as County Road 45, eastward as County Road 503 |
| Kawartha Lakes Road 46 | Agnes Street, King Street, Nappadale Street | 25.7 | 16.0 | Highway 7 | Road 48 (Portage Road) | Woodville, Argyle, Bolsover | Formerly Highway 46, prior to 1997; concurrent with City Road 9 for 0.3 km (0.19 mi) |
| Kawartha Lakes Road 47 | Mara–Carden Boundary Road, Brechin Road | 8.2 | 5.1 | Concession Road | Road 6 (Kirkfield Road) | | Continues westward as County Road 47 |
| Kawartha Lakes Road 48 | Portage Road | 29.2 | 18.1 | Eldon–Thorah Townline Road | Highway 35 (Main Street) | Bolsover, Kirkfield, Victoria Road, Corsons, Coboconk | Formerly Highway 48, prior to 1997; continues westward as Regional Road 48 |
| Kawartha Lakes Road 49 | East Street North | 18.0 | 11.2 | Road 36 (Main Street) | Road 121 | Bobcaygeon | Formerly Highway 649, prior to 1997 |
| Kawartha Lakes Road 57 | Golf Course Road | 10.2 | 6.3 | Durham–Kawartha Lakes boundary | Highway 35 | Janetville | Continues westward as Regional Road 57 |
| Kawartha Lakes Road 121 | Lindsay Street, Colborne Street, Short Street, Snowdon Road | 42.0 | 26.1 | Highway 35 | Boundary Road | Fenelon Falls, Burnt River, Kinmount | Formerly Highway 121, prior to 1998; continues northward as County Road 121; concurrent with City Road 8 for 1.9 km (1.2 mi) |
