= Ontario Highway 118 =

Ontario provincial highway

Highway 118
- Highway 118 highlighted in red

Route information
- Maintained by the Ministry of Transportation
- Length: 127.8 km (79.4 mi)
- Existed: November 16, 1955–present

Major junctions
- West end: Highway 11 near Bracebridge
- Highway 35 in Carnarvon
- East end: Highway 28 near Bancroft

Location
- Country: Canada
- Province: Ontario
- Divisions: Muskoka District, Haliburton County, Hastings County
- Towns: Bracebridge, Uffington, Vankoughnet, Carnarvon, Haliburton Village, Tory Hill, Cardiff, Paudash

Highway system
- Ontario provincial highways; Current; Former; 400-series
← Highway 115	→ Highway 124
Former provincial highways
← Highway 117	Highway 119 →

King's Highway 118, commonly referred to as Highway 118, is a provincially maintained highway in the Canadian province of Ontario. The route travels across South-Central Ontario between Highway 11 near Bracebridge and Highway 28 near Bancroft. Several communities are served by the route, including Uffington, Vankoughnet, Carnarvon, West Guilford, Haliburton Village, Tory Hill, Cardiff and Paudash.

The Department of Highways (DHO), predecessor to the modern Ministry of Transportation (MTO), first assumed Highway 118 in 1955 between Highway 69 at Glen Orchard and Highway 35 in Dorset, via Bracebridge and Highway 11. In 1974, the section from Bracebridge to Dorset was renumbered as Highway 117 in preparation to extend Highway 118 along Muskoka District Road 4 (Peterson Road) towards Haliburton, which took place in 1981. In 1998, the segment west of Bracebridge was transferred, or "downloaded" to the District Municipality of Muskoka. However, in 2001, Highway 118 was extended east along the route of Highway 121 from Haliburton Village to Paudash.

== Route description ==
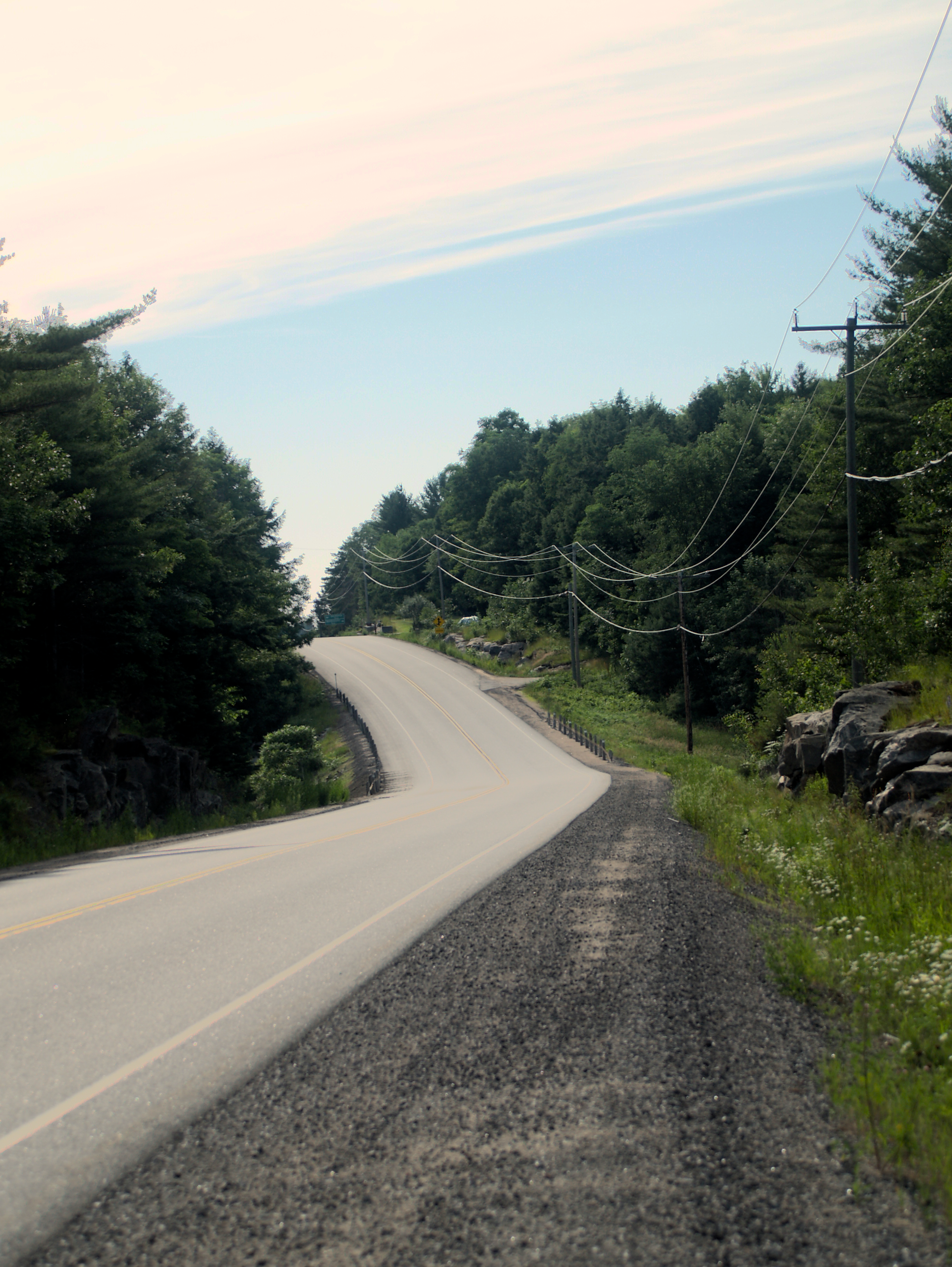
Highway 118 east of Muskoka Falls

Highway 118 travels from Highway 11 near Muskoka Falls, southeast of Bracebridge, to Highway 28 in Paudash. The highway generally follows near the 45th parallel north. Several communities are served by the route, including Uffington, Vankoughnet, Carnarvon, West Guilford, Haliburton Village, Tory Hill and Cardiff. The total length of Highway 118 is 127.8 kilometres (79.4 mi). It is situated in Muskoka District and Haliburton County with a small section in Hastings County at its eastern terminus. The majority of Highway 118 travels through the heavily forested Canadian Shield, with numerous lakes and large rock outcroppings throughout its length.

Highway 118 begins at an interchange with Highway 11 (Exit 182), from which it proceeds east. The route previously continued west into Bracebridge and beyond, but this section is no longer a provincial highway and is known as Muskoka District Road 118W or as the Frank Miller Memorial Scenic Route. Travelling eastward roughly following the historic Peterson Colonization Road, the highway parallels the southern side of the Muskoka River to Muskoka District Road 20 (Uffington Road) north of Uffington. It meanders eastward to north of Vankoughnet before curving northeast alongside the Black River. After crossing the river, the highway geometry markedly improves and the route zig-zags east towards Highway 35 at Carnarvon.

East of Carnarvon, Highway 118 jogs northeast before turning south at West Guilford. It travels through Haliburton Village, the primary town in the Haliburton cottaging and resort region, where it encounters former Highway 121 before turning southeast towards Tory Hill. There it encounters the former Highway 503, and through traffic must turn east. A short distance later traffic must turn southeast at an intersection with former Highway 648 near Wilberforce. Highway 118 continues east in a roughly straight line, encountering Highway 648 a second time before turning south to Cardiff. The highway ends a short distance later at Highway 28 in Paudash.

== History ==
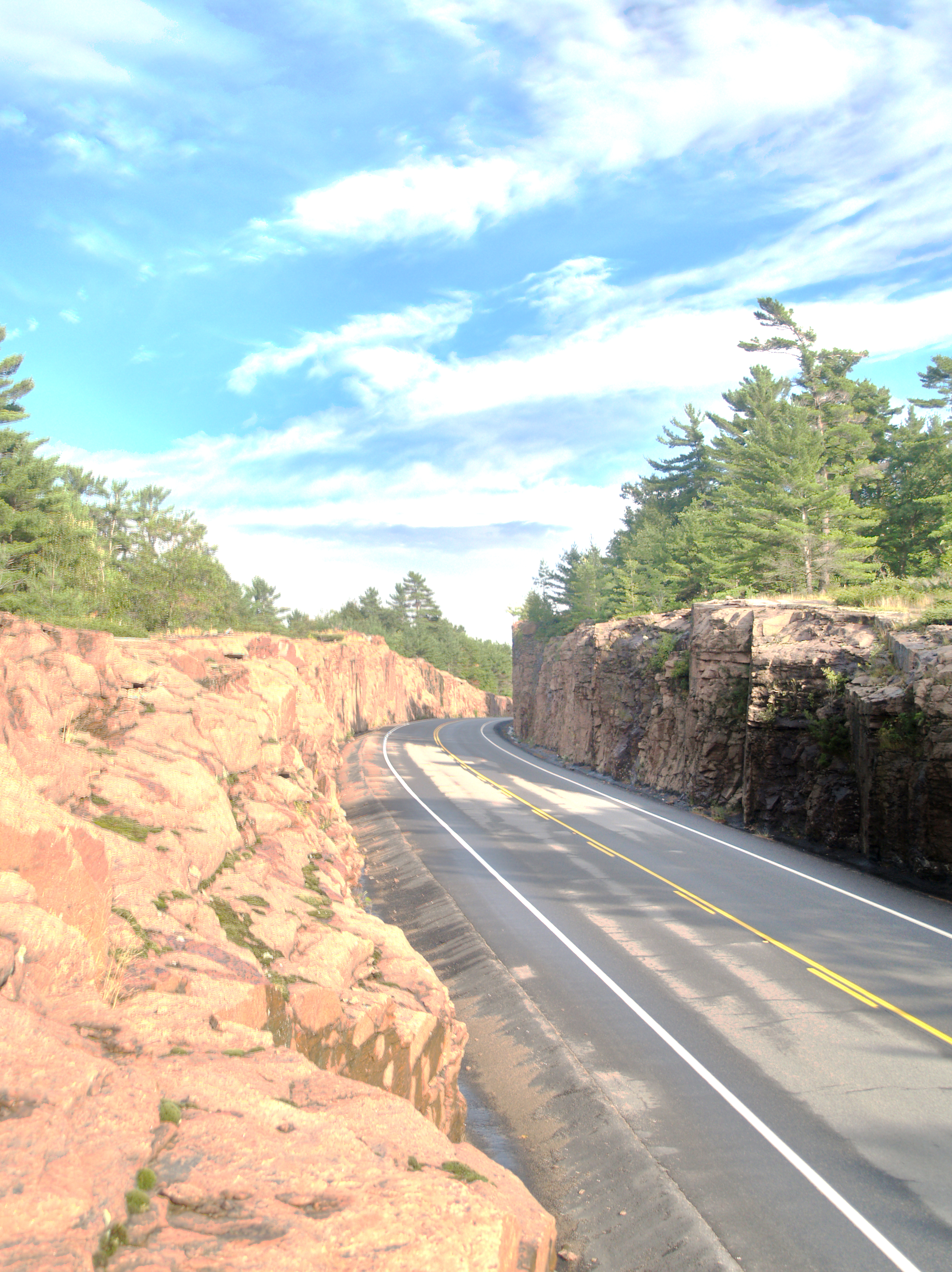
Highway 118 passes through a half-kilometre rock cut between Milford Bay and Port Carling, one of the longest in the province

=== Colonization roads ===
The route of Highway 118, including portions that are no longer part of the highway, takes its roots from the early colonization roads that were built by the government of Upper Canada and later Ontario throughout the mid-1800s. The highway traces the route of the Lake Joseph Road, the Peterson Road, the North West Road, and the Monck Road. The Lake Joseph Road was completed between the Musquosh Road at Glen Orchard and the Muskoka Road at Bracebridge in 1874. The Peterson Road, meanwhile, was built east of Bracebridge through Carnarvon and beyond between 1858 and 1863. Although much of it fell into disuse within a decade, Highway 118 roughly traces its route between Bracebridge and West Guilford. The North West Road was built during the same period, connecting Haliburton Village with the Peterson Road at West Guilford. The Monck Road was built soon after the other roads, with the route being surveyed between Orillia and Bancroft in 1864–65 and construction taking place between 1866 and 1873. Highway 118 follows or roughly traces the eastern portion of the Monck Road, between Tory Hill and Paudash.

=== Provincial highway ===
The present route of Highway 118 was pieced together over several decades, and includes none of the original highway designated in 1955. The original routing of Highway 118 began at Highway 69 in Glen Orchard and travelled 86.0 km (53.4 mi) to Highway 35 at Dorset, with a 4.0 km (2.5 mi) concurrency along Highway 11 north of Bracebridge. The Department of Highways, predecessor to the modern Ministry of Transportation, assumed the road between Bracebridge and Dorset on November 16, 1955, while the road between Glen Orchard and Bracebridge was assumed one week later on November 23. This routing of Highway 118 remained in place until 1974, when the portion between Highway 11 and Dorset was redesignated as Highway 117, reducing the length of Highway 118 to 34.8 km (21.6 mi). By 1978 a short 4.5 km (2.8 mi) extension south of Bracebridge to Highway 11 along Ecclestone Drive was added to the highway, bringing its length to 39.3 km (24.4 mi). ^{map}

Prior to the early 1970s, there were no roads linking Highway 11 with Highway 35 between Orillia–Norland and Bracebridge–Dorset. The newly formed District Municipality of Muskoka decided to extend the Peterson Road, which fell into disuse east of Vankoughnet in the 1870s, to Carnarvon, despite nearly half of the route lying in neighbouring Haliburton County. Muskoka District Road 4, as it was then-known, was opened between Highway 11 near Muskoka Airport and Highway 35 at Carnarvon in the fall of 1972.

The road east of Carnarvon to Haliburton incorporates portions of the Peterson Road to West Guilford, and the North West Road thereafter. These two colonization roads were assumed by the DHO in 1956 as Highway 530 and a portion of Highway 519. That year also saw the creation of Highway 121 between Fenelon Falls and Tory Hill via Minden and Haliburton. To the east, the discovery of uranium deposits near Cardiff in 1952 resulted in a large mining boom for the Bancroft area. As a result, the DHO began constructing a new highway in 1956 which would connect the mines with Highway 28. This new road would open as Highway 109 in 1958, connecting Highway 500 northeast of Tory Hill with Highway 28 at Paudash; the road was paved in 1961. On March 1, 1964, several highways were renumbered in the Bancroft area. Highway 121 was extended from Tory Hill to Paudash via Highway 500 and Highway 109 as a result of this renumbering.

The renamed MTO assumed control of Muskoka Road 4 between Highway 11 and Highway 35 on November 27, 1981, and designated it as an extension of Highway 118. On the same day, the entirety of Highway 530 and the southernmost section of Highway 519 were renumbered as part of Highway 118, bringing the highway to a length of 116 km (72 mi) with the eastern terminus at a junction with Highway 121 (Highland Street) in Haliburton Village. ^{map}

=== Highway transfers ===
Between 1981 and 1998, Highway 118 remained unchanged. However, budget constraints brought on by a recession in the 1990s resulted in the Mike Harris provincial government forming the Who Does What? committee to determine cost-cutting measures in order to balance the budget after a deficit incurred by former premier Bob Rae. It was determined that many Ontario highways no longer served long-distance traffic movement and should therefore be maintained by local or regional levels of government. The MTO consequently transferred many highways to lower levels of government in 1997 and 1998, which resulted in the removal of a significant percentage of the provincial highway network. As the portion of Highway 118 west of Gravenhurst generally only served local traffic heading towards cottage country, and not province-wide movement, the route was transferred to the District Municipality of Muskoka. On January 1, 1998, 26.6 kilometres (16.5 mi) of Highway 118, between Highway 169 and Highway 11 was redesignated as Muskoka Regional Road 118 West. A majority of that route was co-signed as the Frank Miller Memorial Scenic Route effective May 14, 2001. Between 1998 and 2003, Highway 118's eastern terminus was in Haliburton at Highland Street, the western terminus of Highway 121, which continued east to Paudash. On May 1, 2003, Highway 121 was renumbered east of Haliburton as Highway 118, establishing the current route of the highway.

== Major intersections ==
The following table lists the major junctions along Highway 118, as noted by the Ministry of Transportation of Ontario.

Division	Location	km	mi	Destinations	Notes
Muskoka	Muskoka Lakes	−38.3	−23.8	District Road 169 – Gravenhurst, Parry Sound District Road 118 begins	Glen Orchard; formerly Highway 169; former Highway 118 western terminus; Muskoka District Road 118 western terminus
Muskoka	Bracebridge	−6.4	−4.0	District Road 4 north (Monck Road)	
Muskoka	Gravenhurst – Bracebridge boundary	0.0	0.0	Highway 11 – Toronto, North Bay Highway 118 begins District Road 118 ends	Highway 118 western terminus; Muskoka District Road 118 eastern terminus; Highway 11 exit 182
Muskoka	Gravenhurst – Bracebridge boundary	0.8	0.50	District Road 1 south (Gravenhurst Parkway)	Muskoka Falls; to Muskoka Airport
Muskoka	Bracebridge	10.3	6.4	District Road 20 south (Uffington Road)	
Haliburton	Algonquin Highlands – Minden Hills boundary	50.2	31.2	County Road 11 north (Kushog Lake Road)	
Haliburton	Minden Hills	54.0	33.6	Highway 35 – Dorset, Minden	Carnarvon
Haliburton	Dysart et al	66.6	41.4	County Road 6 east (Eagle Lake Road); County Road 7 north (Kennisis Lake Road)	West Guilford
Haliburton	Dysart et al	72.5	45.0	County Road 14 north (Haliburton Lake Road)	
Haliburton	Dysart et al	75.8	47.1	County Road 19 east (Harburn Road)	
Haliburton	Dysart et al	77.9	48.4	County Road 21 (Highland Street) – Minden	Haliburton; formerly Highway 121; former Highway 118 eastern terminus
Haliburton	Dysart et al	83.1	51.6	County Road 3 south (Glamorgan Road)	
Haliburton	Highlands East	96.6	60.0	County Road 4 east (Essonville Line) – Wilberforce	
Haliburton	Highlands East	101.1	62.8	County Road 503 east – Gooderham, Kinmount	Tory Hill; formerly Highway 503 east
Haliburton	Highlands East	104.9	65.2	County Road 648 east (Loop Road) – Wilberforce	Formerly Highway 648 east
Haliburton	Highlands East	114.6	71.2	County Road 48 south (Dyno Road)	Formerly Highway 648 south
Haliburton	Highlands East	116.3	72.3	County Road 648 west (Loop Road) – Highland Grove	Formerly Highway 648 north
Haliburton	Highlands East	123.7	76.9	County Road 9 south (Inlet Bay Road)	Cardiff
Hastings	Faraday	127.7	79.3	Highway 28 – Bancroft, Peterborough	Paudash; Highway 118 eastern terminus; former Highway 121 eastern terminus
1.000 mi = 1.609 km; 1.000 km = 0.621 mi: Closed/former; Route transition
