= Ontario Highway 35 =

Ontario provincial highway

Highway 35
- Highway 35 highlighted in red

Route information
- Maintained by Ministry of Transportation of Ontario
- Length: 195.6 km (121.5 mi)
- Existed: 1931–present

Major junctions
- South end: Highway 401 – Newcastle
- Highway 407 in Clarington; Highway 115 – Peterborough; Highway 7A – Port Perry, Bethany; Highway 7 in Lindsay; Highway 118 at Carnarvon
- North end: Highway 60 near Algonquin Provincial Park

Location
- Country: Canada
- Province: Ontario
- Counties: Durham; Kawartha Lakes; Haliburton; Muskoka
- Towns: Newcastle, Orono, Lindsay, Coboconk, Norland, Minden Hills, Carnarvon, Dorset, Dwight

Highway system
- Ontario provincial highways; Current; Former; 400-series
← Highway 34	→ Highway 37
Former provincial highways
Highway 36 →

King's Highway 35, commonly referred to as Highway 35, is a provincially maintained highway in the Canadian province of Ontario, linking Highway 401 with the Kawartha Lakes, Haliburton County, and Algonquin Provincial Park. The highway travels from west of Newcastle, through Lindsay, near Fenelon Falls, Coboconk, Minden Hills, and into Haliburton before terminating at Highway 60 to the west of Algonquin Park. Within those areas, it services the communities of Orono, Cameron, Rosedale, Norland, Moore Falls, Miners Bay, Lutterworth, Carnarvon, Buttermilk Falls, Halls Lake, Pine Springs, and Dorset. The winding course of the road, combined with the picturesque views offered along its length, have led some to declare it the most scenic highway in Ontario.

Most of the route, including a portion of Highway 60, was assumed by the Department of Highways (DHO), predecessor to the Ministry of Transportation (MTO) by 1940. In the mid-1950s, several bypasses were constructed to divert Highway 35 away from town centres including Lindsay, Fenelon Falls and Minden. Highway 115 was built east from Enterprise Hill to Peterborough in 1953, and signed concurrently with Highway 35 south for 19 kilometres (12 mi) in 1961. This portion was widened to a divided expressway in the late 1980s. Studies are considering whether to widen the route between Enterprise Hill and Lindsay to four lanes, including reconstructing the trumpet interchange at the former. Expansion of part of the Lindsay bypass to four lanes was scheduled to begin in 2023.

Highway 35 is patrolled along its entirety by the Ontario Provincial Police. The speed limit for most of the length of the highway is 80 kilometres per hour (50 mph), slowing to 50 km/h (31 mph) within built-up areas, and increasing to 90 km/h (56 mph) when it connects with Highway 115.

== Route description ==
Highway 35 immediately south of the split with Highway 115

=== Newcastle–Coboconk ===
Highway 35 begins at a trumpet interchange with Highway 401 west of Newcastle, where it is concurrent with Highway 115 for 18.9 kilometres (11.7 mi) to Enterprise Hill. For the length of this concurrency, which is located entirely within the municipality of Clarington in the Regional Municipality of Durham, it is a divided four lane route with no left turns, known as right-in/right-out (RIRO). It begins in a northeasterly direction, with an interchange at former Highway 2 (now Durham Regional Highway 2) prior to curving north. Several businesses, including gas stations and fast food franchises, line the next portion of the highway interspersed among farmland. After swerving to the east of Orono, Highway 35/115 meets the eastern terminus of Highway 407. It enters the Oak Ridges Moraine and passes through the eastern edge of the Ganaraska Forest at Enterprise Hill. Highway 35 exits the divided highway, which continues as Highway 115 east to Peterborough, at a trumpet interchange known as the 35/115 split, and proceeds north as a two lane road.

Highway 35 crosses into the city of Kawartha Lakes, a mostly rural single-tier municipality, at Boundary Road (Durham/Kawartha Lakes Road 20), which provides access to the nearby Canadian Tire Motorsport Park. The highway travels north in a straight line, passing to the east of Pontypool before exiting the Oak Ridges Moraine near Ballyduff Road. It intersects the eastern leg of Highway 7A, then curves northeast briefly before encountering the western leg. The headwaters of the Pigeon River lie nearby, the river itself being crossed just south of Janetville Road (Kawartha Lakes Road 57). The terrain flattens approaching Lindsay, where the route intersects Highway 7 (Trans-Canada Highway), onto which it turns west and becomes concurrent. Highway 7/35 bypass Lindsay to the southwest, after which Highway 35 branches east onto Kent Street, then north, while Highway 7 continues west.

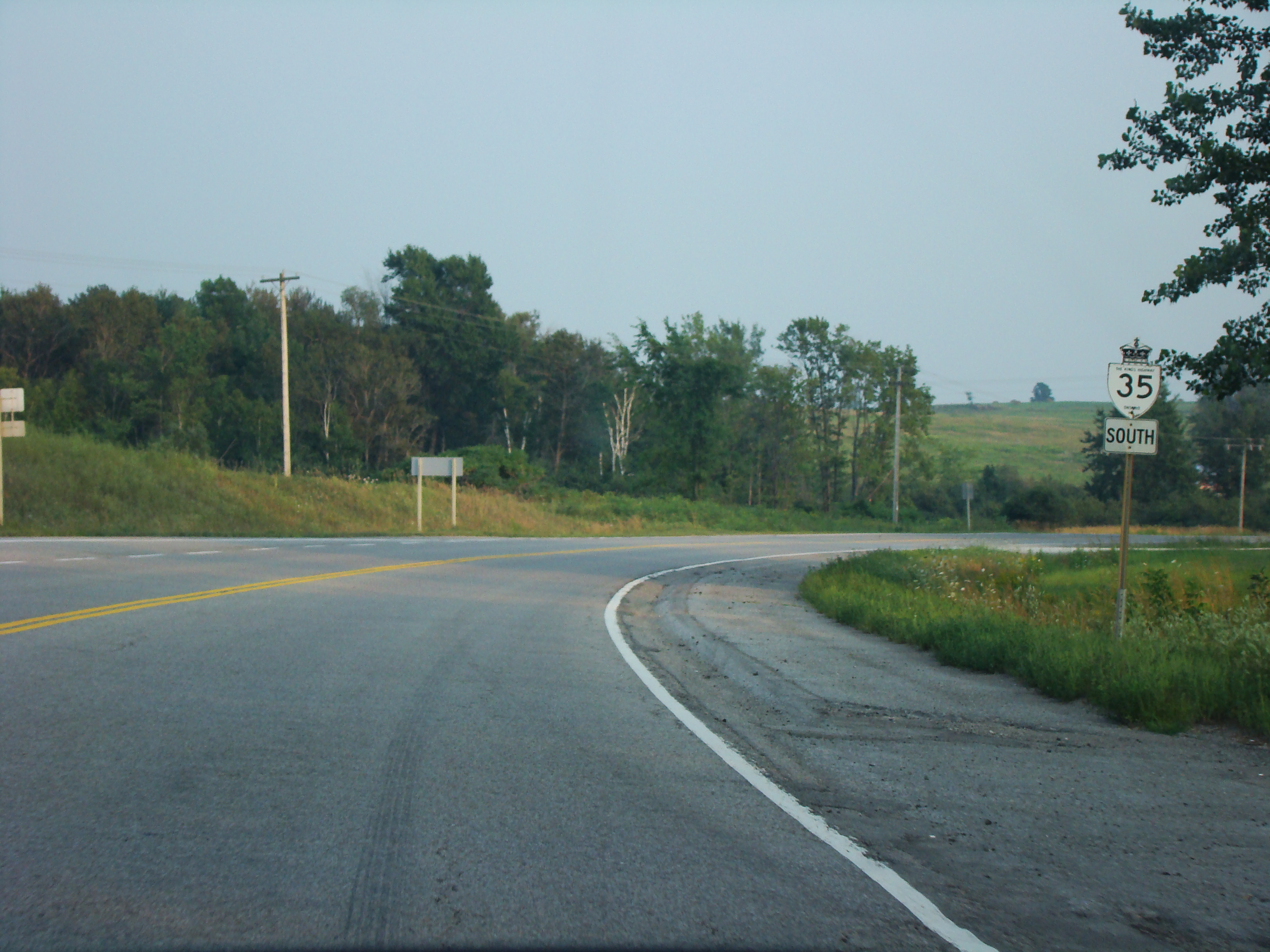
Highway 35 near Fenelon Falls

North of Lindsay, Highway 35 travels near the Trent–Severn Waterway, tracing its route alongside Sturgeon Lake, Cameron Lake and Balsam Lake. It passes over the first of several limestone cuestas near the Ken Reid Conservation Area as it approaches the boundary between the Ordovician limestone and the Precambrian Canadian Shield. The route curves northeast and travels through farmland as well as the community of Cameron, before turning back northward at Powles Corners, where it intersects the southern end of former Highway 121 (now Kawartha Lakes Road 121). It continues north a short distance to intersect Kawartha Lakes Road 8, the eastern leg formerly being Highway 35A into Fenelon Falls. The highway curves around the southern end of Cameron Lake near Isaacs Glen, travels north for a brief period then zig-zags northeast through Rosedale, where it crosses the Trent–Severn on the Constable Randall F. Skidmore Bridge, named after a local police officer who was involved in a fatal crash nearby on February 14, 1986. The farmland alongside the highway thins out north of Rosedale, as the route makes its approach to Coboconk.

=== Coboconk–Dwight ===
Highway 35 passes through several imposing rock cuts beginning north of Norland

Approaching the village of Coboconk, Highway 35 descends a second cuesta to the Gull River valley. It crosses the river and intersects the former northeastern terminus of Highway 48. North of the village, the route makes its final descent from the flat limestone plateau into the rocky Canadian Shield. The topography quickly shifts from grassland and deciduous forest to granite outcroppings and Boreal forest as the highway winds along the west side of Silver and Shadow lakes. In Norland, the route intersects former Highway 503 (now Kawartha Lakes Road 45). It begins to follow alongside the Gull River—which it continues to cross and parallel for the remainder of its length—as it curves northeast into Haliburton County. Highway 35 travels along the eastern edge of the Queen Elizabeth II Wildlands Provincial Park as it curves around Moore and Gull Lake, passing through the communities of Moore Falls and Miners Bay. Several passing lanes and a short stretch of four lane highway exist in this segment. It reaches the town of Minden where it meets former Highway 121 again and provides access to the Minden Wild Water Preserve.

Highway 35 generally follows the former Bobcaygeon Colonization Road north of Minden, though several realignments over the years have led to its current winding route. At Carnarvon, it meets with Highway 118. The route then follows the east side of Boshkung Lake, passes through Buttermilk Falls, travels long the west side of Halls Lake, then arches northwest to cross the midpoint of Kushog Lake. Heading northward into increasingly mountainous terrain, the highway crosses into Muskoka near Dorset, and shortly thereafter reaches its northern terminus at Highway 60 west of Algonquin Park.

=== Traffic ===
Traffic volumes on Highway 35 vary considerably over the length of the highway, as well as over the course of the year due to its use for recreational purposes, including snowmobiling, camping, and vacations in cottage country. Along the Highway 35/115 concurrency, the average daily vehicle count is above 20,000. This drops as Highway 35 splits off at Enterprise Hill to under 10,000 vehicles per day. That volume is fairly consistent as far north as Minden, at which point the vehicle count drops below 5,000 and tapers off as low as 2,000 at Highway 60.

Highway 35 is patrolled along its entirety by the Ontario Provincial Police. The speed limit for most of the length of the highway is 80 kilometres per hour (50 mph), slowing to 50 km/h (31 mph) within built-up areas, and increasing to 90 km/h (56 mph) when it connects with Highway 115.

== History ==
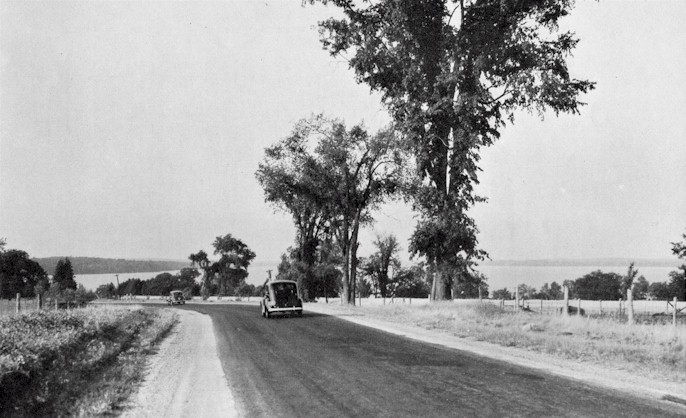
Highway 35 overlooking Cameron Lake in 1941

Highway 35, like many highways that begin at Lake Ontario and eventually cross into the Canadian Shield, began as several trails connecting settlements. Most of the southern portion of the highway follows various sidelines and concessions. Between Lindsay and Fenelon Falls, Highway 35 follows the former Fenelon Road, while north of there it follows The Cameron Road, a trail carved in the 1850s between Fenelon and Minden. North of Minden, the highway roughly follows The Bobcaygeon Road, a colonization road built as far north as Dwight in the 1850s.

=== Predecessors and construction ===
Several portions of Highway 35 were built along or nearby the Bobcaygeon Road, a colonization road built in the 1850s to open settlement into the frontier of Central Ontario. The first half of the 19th century saw settlement occur along "the front", the townships established along the shores of Lake Ontario. Seeking to open the interior lands of Upper Canada to prospective settlers and farming, the government began the construction of the colonization roads through the wilderness of the southern edge of the Canadian Shield. In 1854, Michael Deane surveyed a line between present-day Bobcaygeon and Carnarvon. Actual construction of a passable road along the survey line began on October 16, 1856. It was named by Peterborough County sheriff William Conger, whom had promoted the building of the road for several years.

five miles (8.0 km) of the Bobcaygeon Road were opened by the end of 1856. By the end of 1858, it was opened to north of the Burnt River in Kinmount, and by 1860 to the Gull River, where the townsite of Minden was established. The road was opened farther north to the Peterson Road at Carnarvon in the summer of 1861, and to Dorset by the end of 1862. Maintenance of the road was accomplished through statute labour, which was unable to keep up with the degradation caused by the elements. Despite its poor condition, the Bobcaygeon Road stayed in use until the future route of Highway 35 was built in the 1930s.

Construction at Halls Lake in 1934

At the height of the Great Depression, work began in late 1931 between Coboconk and Dorset to build a new road. The relief project employed upwards of 2,300 men, who resided in at least 13 temporary work camps. Work was done by hand in many places, with only dynamite and horses to aid construction along the rocky shorelines of lakes. Construction wrapped up by the end of 1936, the final year before the jurisdiction of the DHO was extended north of the Trent–Severn Waterway.

=== Designation and paving ===
The Highway 35 designation was first applied in 1931 to the road between Lindsay and Fenelon Falls. The DHO assumed the Cameron Road through the townships of Ops and Fenelon on July 1 of that year. It was extended north along the road between Fenelon Falls and Rosedale on April 15, 1934, bringing the length of the highway up to 38.9 kilometres (24.2 mi). On April 1, 1937, the Department of Northern Development merged into the DHO,. As a result, an additional 138.4 kilometres (86.0 mi) of road were added to the length of Highway 35. The portion south of Coboconk within Victoria County was assumed by the department on August 11 of that year, while the remainder within the county from Coboconk to north of Norland was assumed several weeks later on September 1. The portion lying within Haliburton County, from north of Norland to Dwight and Huntsville, was assumed a month later on October 6. Finally, a 53.2-kilometre (33.1 mi) section between Lindsay and Newcastle was assumed by the DHO on April 13, 1938, bringing the highway to its peak length of 232.6 kilometres (144.5 mi).

At this point, much of the assumed route was a gravel road. Only the section south of Orono and from Lindsay to Cameron was paved. Construction quickly began to pave the gravel sections of the route. Approximately 11 kilometres (6.8 mi) of paving between Cameron and Fenelon Falls was completed in 1938. By 1939, the concurrency of Highway 35/60 between Huntsville and Dwight was also paved. In 1940, paving of a gravel mulch surface was completed from Dwight south for approximately 2.5 kilometres (1.6 mi) to Birkendale, as well as approximately 15 kilometres (9.3 mi) from the Victoria–Haliburton county boundary north of Norland to Minden. Approximately 24 kilometres (15 mi) of paving north of Carnarvon to Wren Lake was completed in 1942. The remaining 27 kilometres (17 mi) of gravel road between Wren Lake and Birkendale was paved in 1945. A permanent pavement was laid from north of Norland to Dwight, as well as between Fenelon Falls and Rosedale in 1947. Paving was completed between Rosedale and Coboconk in 1950, and on the remaining gap between Coboconk and the Victoria–Haliburton county boundary in 1953. It would take until 1958 for paving to commence south of Lindsay.

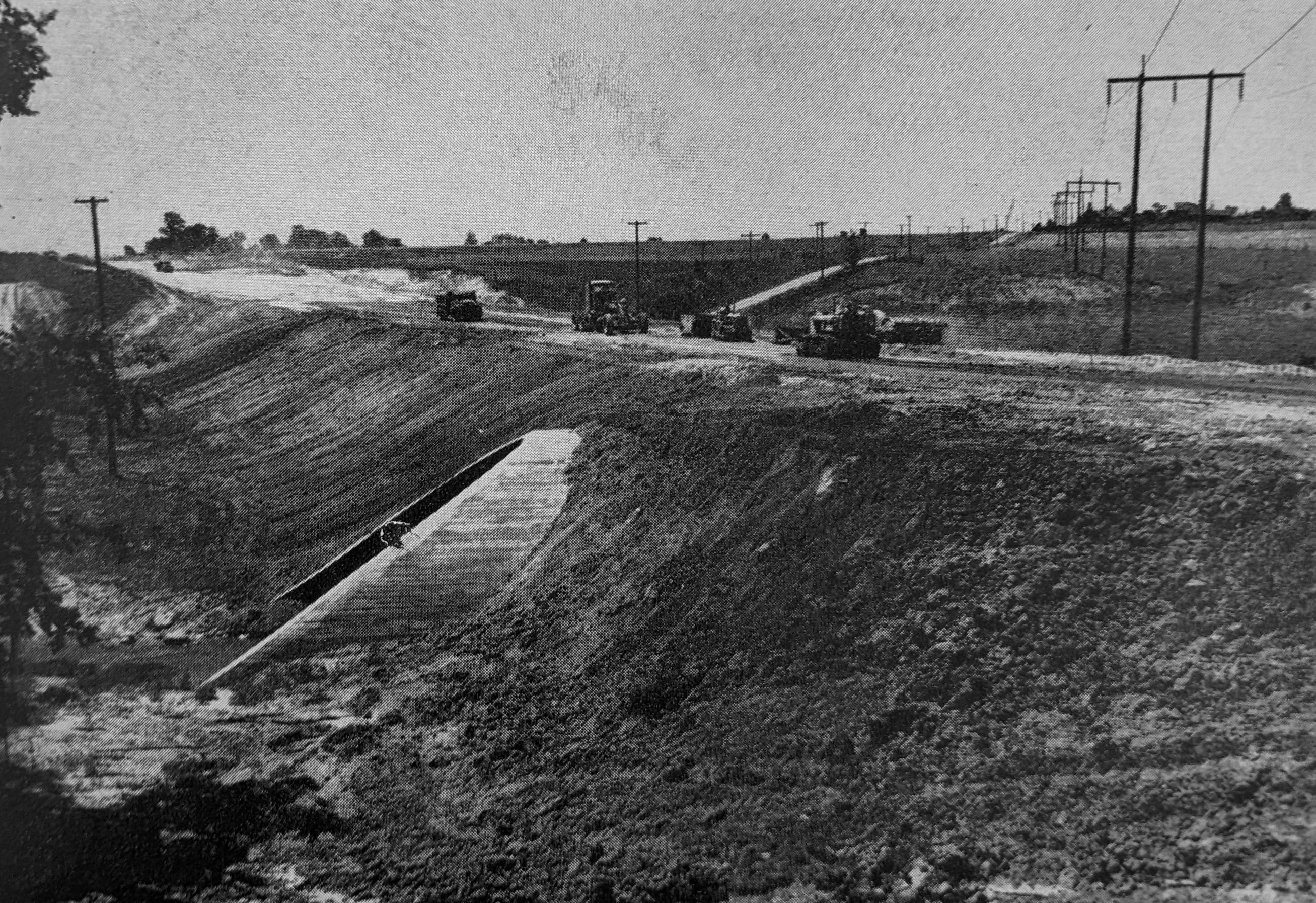
Construction to link Highway 35 with the recently completed Highway 401 extension east of Oshawa in 1955

In 1953, Highway 115 was built as a two lane road eastward from Highway 35 near Pontypool. It was completed to Peterborough by 1954, and co-designated with Highway 35 southwards in 1961. Construction began to widen both to four lanes beginning in 1984, which was completed in the late 1980s and early 1990s. The concurrency with Highway 60 was removed from Highway 35 after 1961, but before 1969.

Beginning in 1954, several bypasses were constructed around the towns and villages along the route. The first of these was in Minden, bypassing the old route along the Bobcaygeon Road and South Water Street. This was followed by the bypassing of Fenelon Falls in 1955. Highway 35 followed present day Kawartha Lakes Road 121 and Kawartha Lakes Road 8 into and out of the village until the Seventh Concession Line was paved and the highway rerouted onto it. In 1956, Newcastle and Orono were bypassed and Highway 35 connected directly to the then eastern terminus of Highway 401 west of the village. The former route is now Durham Regional Road 19. Work also began that year to rebuild the highway north to Lindsay, as well as on the Lindsay Bypass. Prior to the opening of the bypass, Highway 35 followed Lindsay Street to Kent Street and jogged northwest along William Street and Colborne Street. It then followed today's Kawartha Lakes Road 4 north and west to the current intersection with Highway 35. This routing became Highway 35B when the bypass opened on October 10, 1958. In the 1960s, the route through Pontypool (now known as John Street) was bypassed.

Highway 35 north of Coboconk, showcasing the fall display. Shadow and Silver lakes are visible.

Prior to 2007, the highway was extensively rehabilitated between Kawartha Lakes Road 121, near Fenelon Falls and Highway 118 in Carnarvon. This included widening the highway for a third passing lane, as well as the resurfacing of several sections.

On the day before Remembrance Day, 2009, the section of Highway 35 between Lindsay and Norland was renamed the Midland Regiment Commemorative Highway, in honour of veterans of World War II. Signs are placed along the highway at regular intervals to acknowledge the designation. On April 25, 2012, four bridges along the highway were renamed in memory of police officers killed in the line of duty: The Constable Randall F. Skidmore Bridge over the Trent–Severn Waterway in Rosedale; the Constable Eric Nystedt Bridge over the Gull River in Moore Falls; and the Corporal James Smith Bridge and Detective Sergeant Lorne J. Chapitis Bridge between Miners Bay and Minden.

== Future ==
The MTO is currently performing an environmental assessment on Highway 35 between the Highway 115 split and Lindsay, in preparation for a four-lane expansion. In 2009, the provincial government of Dalton McGuinty promised to widen Highway 7/35 near Lindsay. Work began later that year to widen the bridge over the Scugog River to accommodate a four-lane cross section. A detailed design report was submitted in late 2021 to move forward with the widening, which was scheduled to begin in 2023.

== Major intersections ==
The following table lists the major junctions along Highway 35, as noted by the Ministry of Transportation of Ontario.

Division	Location	km	mi	Destinations	Notes
Durham	Clarington	0.0	0.0	Highway 401 – Toronto, Kingston Highway 115 begins	Highway 35 / Highway 115 southern terminus; southern end of Highway 115 concurrency; Highway 401 exit 436
Durham	Clarington	0.7	0.43	Lovekin Road	
Durham	Clarington	1.3	0.81	Regional Highway 2 – Newcastle, Bowmanville	Formerly Highway 2
Durham	Clarington	4.2	2.6	Regional Road 17 (Main Street) – Newcastle; Clarke 3rd Concession	
Durham	Clarington	6.2	3.9	Clarke 4th Concession	
Durham	Clarington (Orono)	8.1	5.0	Regional Road 17 (Main Street)	No northbound entrance; northbound exit via Clarke 5th Concession
Durham	Clarington (Orono)	8.6	5.3	Station Street	No access across Highway 115 (right-in/right out)
Durham	Clarington (Orono)	10.2	6.3	Mill Street / Tamblyn Road	Southbound exit and entrance to Mill Street; northbound exit and entrance to Tamblyn Road
Durham	Clarington (Orono)	10.9	6.8	Regional Road 4 (Taunton Road); Clarke 6th Concession	
Durham	Clarington	13.4	8.3	Regional Road 9 (Clarke 7th Concession) – Bewdley	
Durham	Clarington	14.3	8.9	Highway 407 west – Toronto	Highway 407 exit 14; opened on December 9, 2019.
Durham	Clarington	15.4	9.6	Clarke 8th Concession	
Durham	Clarington	17.6	10.9	Skelding Road	Southbound exit and entrance
Durham	Clarington	18.7	11.6	Old Highway 35	Southbound entrance
Durham	Clarington	18.7	11.6	Wilcox Road	Northbound exit and entrance
Durham	Clarington	18.9	11.7	Highway 115 north – Peterborough	Highway 115 exit 19; northern end of Highway 115 concurrency
Durham–Kawartha Lakes boundary	Clarington–Kawartha Lakes boundary	20.4	12.7	Durham Regional Road 20 / Kawartha Lakes Road 20 (Boundary Road)	
Kawartha Lakes	Pontypool	22.9	14.2	Road 12 east (Pontypool Road)	
Kawartha Lakes		30.5	19.0	Highway 7A east – Peterborough, Bethany	Southern end of Highway 7A concurrency
Kawartha Lakes		32.0	19.9	Highway 7A west – Port Perry	Northern end of Highway 7A concurrency
Kawartha Lakes		39.1	24.3	Road 57 west (Golf Course Road) – Janetville	
Kawartha Lakes		40.6	25.2	Road 31 east (Mount Horeb Road) – Omemee	
Kawartha Lakes	Lindsay	50.0	31.1	Highway 7 east / TCH – Peterborough Road 15 north (Lindsay Street) – Lindsay	Southern end of Highway 7 concurrency and Lindsay Bypass; formerly Highway 7B west / Highway 35B north
Kawartha Lakes	Lindsay	51.4	31.9	Road 4 (Angeline Street South / Little Britain Road)	
Kawartha Lakes	Lindsay	55.5	34.5	Highway 7 west / TCH – Toronto	North end of Highway 7 concurrency and Lindsay Bypass
Kawartha Lakes	Lindsay	56.3	35.0	Kent Street West / Uniroyal Road	Kent Street West formerly Highway 7B east / Highway 35B south
Kawartha Lakes		59.5	37.0	Road 4 (Thunder Bridge Road)	
Kawartha Lakes		62.9	39.1	Road 21 north (Killarney Bay Road)	
Kawartha Lakes				Road 9 west (Cambray Road)	
Kawartha Lakes	Cameron	67.2	41.8	Road 34 (Cameron Road / Long Beach Road)	
Kawartha Lakes	Powles Corners	72.4	45.0	Road 121 north (Victoria Road) – Fenelon Falls	Formerly Highway 121 north
Kawartha Lakes		76.6	47.6	Road 8 east (Victoria Road) – Fenelon Falls	Formerly Highway 35A east
Kawartha Lakes		77.4	48.1	Road 8 west (Glenarm Road)	
Kawartha Lakes	Coboconk	92.5	57.5	Road 43 east (Somerville 7th Concession) – Burnt River, Four Mile Lake	
Kawartha Lakes	Coboconk	92.9	57.7	Road 42 east (Baseline Road)	
Kawartha Lakes	Coboconk	93.7	58.2	Road 48 west (Portage Road) – Beaverton	Formerly Highway 48 west
Kawartha Lakes	Norland	101.4	63.0	Road 45 (Monck Road) – Uphill, Kinmount	Formerly Highway 503
Haliburton	Minden Hills	111.8	69.5	County Road 2 north (Deep Bay Road)	Moore Falls
Haliburton	Minden Hills	126.0	78.3	County Road 121 south – Kinmount	Formerly Highway 121 south; former southern end of Highway 121 concurrency
Haliburton	Minden Hills	128.7	80.0	County Road 16 east (South Lake Road) – Gelert, Lochlin; County Road 2 south (Newcastle Street)	Minden
Haliburton	Minden Hills	130.5	81.1	County Road 21 east – Haliburton Village	Formerly Highway 121 east; former northern end of Highway 121 concurrency
Haliburton	Minden Hills	143.6	89.2	Highway 118 – Bracebridge, Haliburton Village	Carnarvon
Haliburton	Algonquin Highlands	154.2	95.8	County Road 13 east (Little Hawk Lake Road)	
Haliburton	Algonquin Highlands	160.4	99.7	County Road 11 south (Kushog Lake Road)	
Muskoka	Lake of Bays	177.9	110.5	District Road 117 west – Bracebridge	Formerly Highway 117 west
Haliburton	Algonquin Highlands	179.4	111.5	County Road 39 south (Main Street)	Dorset
Haliburton	Algonquin Highlands	179.8	111.7	County Road 8 east (Kawagama Lake Road)	
Muskoka	Lake of Bays	193.7	120.4	District Road 21 west (Fox Point Road)	
Muskoka	Lake of Bays	195.6	121.5	Highway 60 – Huntsville, Whitney, Algonquin Park	Dwight
1.000 mi = 1.609 km; 1.000 km = 0.621 mi: Concurrency terminus; Incomplete access

== Suffixed routes ==
=== Highway 35A ===
Highway 35A
- Location: Highway 35–Fenelon Falls
- Length: 3.7 km (2.3 mi)
- Existed: May 25, 1955–April 1, 1997

Highway 35A was created when a new bypass of Fenelon Falls was assumed by the DHO as part of Highway 35 on May 25, 1955. The old route, between Powles Corners and Fenelon Falls, became part of the new Highway 121 at that time, while the remainder travelling east out of Fenelon Falls was renumbered as Highway 35A. The short 2.7-kilometre (1.7 mi) route remained in the provincial highway system until April 1, 1997, when it was transferred to Victoria County.

=== Highway 35B (Lindsay) ===
Highway 35B
- Location: Kent Street, Lindsay Street
- Length: 5.8 km (3.6 mi)
- Existed: October 10, 1958–April 1, 1997

Highway 35B, which was concurrent for its entire length with Highway 7B, travelled through Lindsay, following Kent Street West and Lindsay Street South, connecting with Highway 35 at both ends. It was created when the Lindsay Bypass was opened on October 10, 1958, redirecting the combined Highway 7/35 southwest of the town. Initially, Highway 35B followed Lindsay Street to Kent Street, then jogged northwest along Kent Street, William Street and Colborne Street. It then followed today's Kawartha Lakes Road 4 north and west to the current intersection with Highway 35, a distance of 8.8 kilometres (5.5 mi). However, on September 21, 1968, the 2.2-kilometre (1.4 mi) portion north of Kent Street was transferred to Victoria County; Highway 35B was consequently rerouted along Kent Street. The remaining 5.8-kilometre (3.6 mi) of the route was decommissioned on April 1, 1997, and transferred to Victoria County.

=== Highway 35B (Dorset) ===
Highway 35B
- Location: Main Street in Dorset
- Existed: 1958–1974
