= Dongola, Ontario =

Coordinates: 44°44′38″N 78°44′20″W

Dongola is an unincorporated community in the Canadian province of Ontario, located within the single-tier municipality of Kawartha Lakes at the intersection of Kawartha Lakes Road 45 (Monck Road) and Road 42 (Base Line Road). The former post-office village contains several households and no businesses. Today, Dongola is all but a ghost town. The site resembles any nearby rural area, surrounded by farmland and forests, with no signs of a centralized built-up area.

The Dongola post office was opened on 1 June 1900, occupying three postmasters. It remained in place until 2 November 1936, when the nearby Coboconk post office established a rural route through the village.

== See also ==
- List of communities in Ontario
