= List of numbered roads in Haliburton County =

List of county roads

This is a list of numbered county roads in Haliburton County, Ontario.

County Road #	Local name(s)	Western/Southern Terminus	Eastern/Northern Terminus	Settlements served	Additional Notes
1	Gelert Road	County Road 121	County Road 21	Haliburton, Gelert	
2	Deep Bay Road	King's Highway 35	Bobcaygeon Road	Minden, Deep Bay, Moore Falls	
3	Glamorgan Road	County Road 503	King's Highway 118	Glamor Lake, Minnicock Lake	
4	Essonville Road	King's Highway 118	County Road 648	Essonville, Wilberforce	
5	South Baptiste Lake Road	County Road 648	Hastings County limits	Highland Grove	road continues in Hastings County to Highway 62 at Birds Creek
6	Eagle Lake Road	King's Highway 118	County Road 14	West Guilford, Eagle Lake	
7	Kennisis Lake Road	King's Highway 118	Wilkinson Road	West Guilford, Kennisis Lake	
8	Kawagama Lake Road	County Road 12	Ladybug Trail	Russell Landing, Kawagama Lake, Slipper Lake	
9	McGillvray Road	King's Highway 28	King's Highway 118	Cardiff, Paudash Lake	
10	Elephant Lake Road	County Road 648	Hastings County limits	Elephant Lake, Algonquin Park	
11	Kushog Lake Road	King's Highway 118	King's Highway 35	Ox Narrows, Patterson Corner	
12	Livingstone Lake Road	King's Highway 35	Troutspawn Lake Road	Fletcher Lake, Livingstone Lake, Kawagama Lake	
13	Little Hawk Lake Road	King's Highway 35	Little Hawk Lake marina	Halls lake, Little Hawk Lake	
14	Haliburton Lake Road	King's Highway 118	County Road 19	Eagle Lake, Fort Irwin	
15	Burleigh Lake Road	County Road 648	Allen River	Allen Lake	
16	South Lake Road	King's Highway 35	County Road 1	Minden	
17	Ingoldsby Road	County Road 1	County Road 18	Ingoldsby	
18	Kashagawigamog Lake Road	County Road 21	County Road 1	Ingoldsby	
19	Harburn Road	King's Highway 118	County Road 14	Harburn, Fort Irwin	
20	Horseshoe Lake Road	King's Highway 35	King's Highway 35	Horseshoe Lake, Soyers Lake	
21	County Road 21; Highland Street	King's Highway 35	King's Highway 118	Haliburton, Soyers Lake	
48	Dyno Road	King's Highway 28	King's Highway 118	Dyno Estates	
121	Snowdon Road	Boundary Road (Kawartha Lakes city limits)	King's Highway 35	Howland Junction	continues as Kawartha Lakes Road 121 to King's Highway 35 at Powles Corners
503	Furnace Falls Road	White Boundary Road (Peterborough County limits)	King's Highway 118	Gooderham, Tory Hill, Irondale	continues as Monck Road (Peterborough County Road 503) to Kinmount
507	Buckhorn Road	Fox Lake Drive (Peterborough County limits)	County Road 503	Gooderham	continues as Peterborough County Road 507 to County Road 36 at Flynns
648	Loop Road	King's Highway 118	King's Highway 118	Wiberforce, Ironsides, Harcourt, Deer Lake	
