= Highlands East, Ontario =

Highlands East
- Township Municipality (lower-tier)
- Municipality of Highlands East
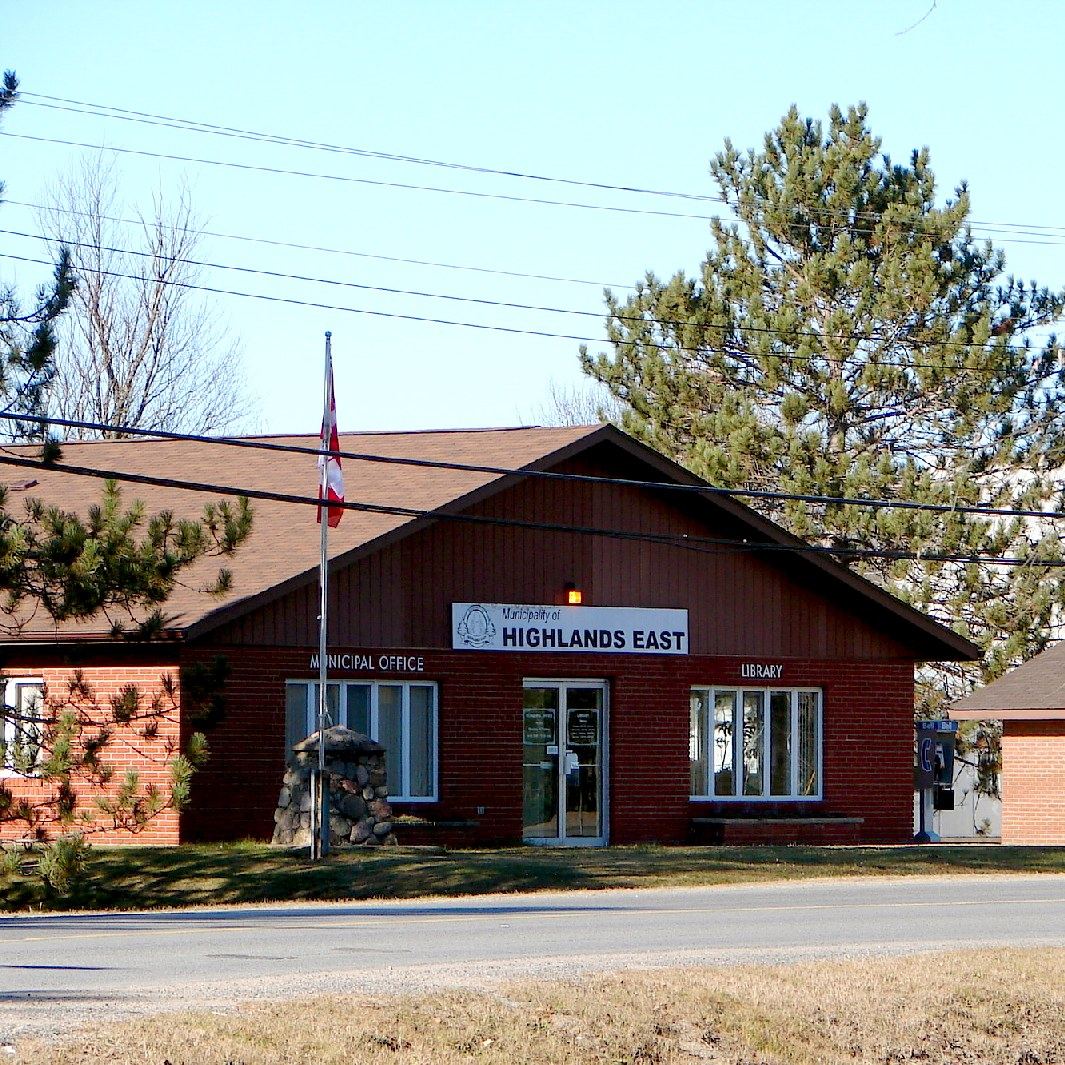
- Town Hall in Cardiff

- Logo

- Location in Southern Ontario Highlands East (Southern Ontario)
- Coordinates: 44°58′N 78°15′W
- Country: Canada
- Province: Ontario
- County: Haliburton
- Established: January 1, 2001

Government
  - Type: Township
  - Mayor: Dave Burton
  - Governing Body: Council of the Municipality of Highlands East
  - MP: Jamie Schmale (CPC)
  - MPP: Laurie Scott

Area
  - Land: 688.18 km^{2} (265.71 sq mi)

Population (2021)
  - Total: 3,830
  - Density: 5.6/km^{2} (15/sq mi)
- Time zone: UTC-5 (EST)
  - Summer (DST): UTC-4 (EDT)
- Postal code: K0L 3C0
- Area code: 705
- Website: www.highlandseast.ca

Highlands East is a township municipality located in Haliburton County, Ontario, Canada.

== History ==
The township was formed on January 1, 2001, through the amalgamation of the former townships of Bicroft, Cardiff, Glamorgan, and Monmouth.

== Communities ==
=== Cardiff ===
Cardiff is a former mining community; Bicroft and Dyno Mines opened in 1956 and closed several years later. The chief mineral being mined in Cardiff was uranium. Cardiff is located on Highway 118 between the towns of Bancroft and Haliburton. The Cardiff Elementary School is a small school. The community also has a Royal Canadian Legion hall, a Catholic and United church, an outdoor pool, which is popular during the summer, a post office, a municipal office, a library, and a skating rink that doubles as an outdoor basketball and floor hockey court. The entrance to the townsite, off of Highway 118, is marked by a large metal sculpture of a dragonfly.

=== Gooderham ===
Gooderham is bordered on the south end of the municipality in proximity to the Irondale River and Pine Lake to the north. It is located on a now defunct railway line, the Irondale, Bancroft and Ottawa (IB&O) Railway, part of which has been since converted into a trail network. The village of Gooderham is at the intersection of the Monck Road from the East and the Buckhorn Road from the South. The origin of the name Gooderham is not known for sure although it is likely that it was named after a member of the distillery-owning Gooderham family donated money for a local church. In any case, it was called Gooderham by the time the first post office was established in 1873. The first mills were built by 1875 using the waterfall between Gooderham Lake and the Irondale River. Logging and farming were the original attractions of the Gooderham area and Gooderham still has an active lumber mill.

=== Wilberforce ===
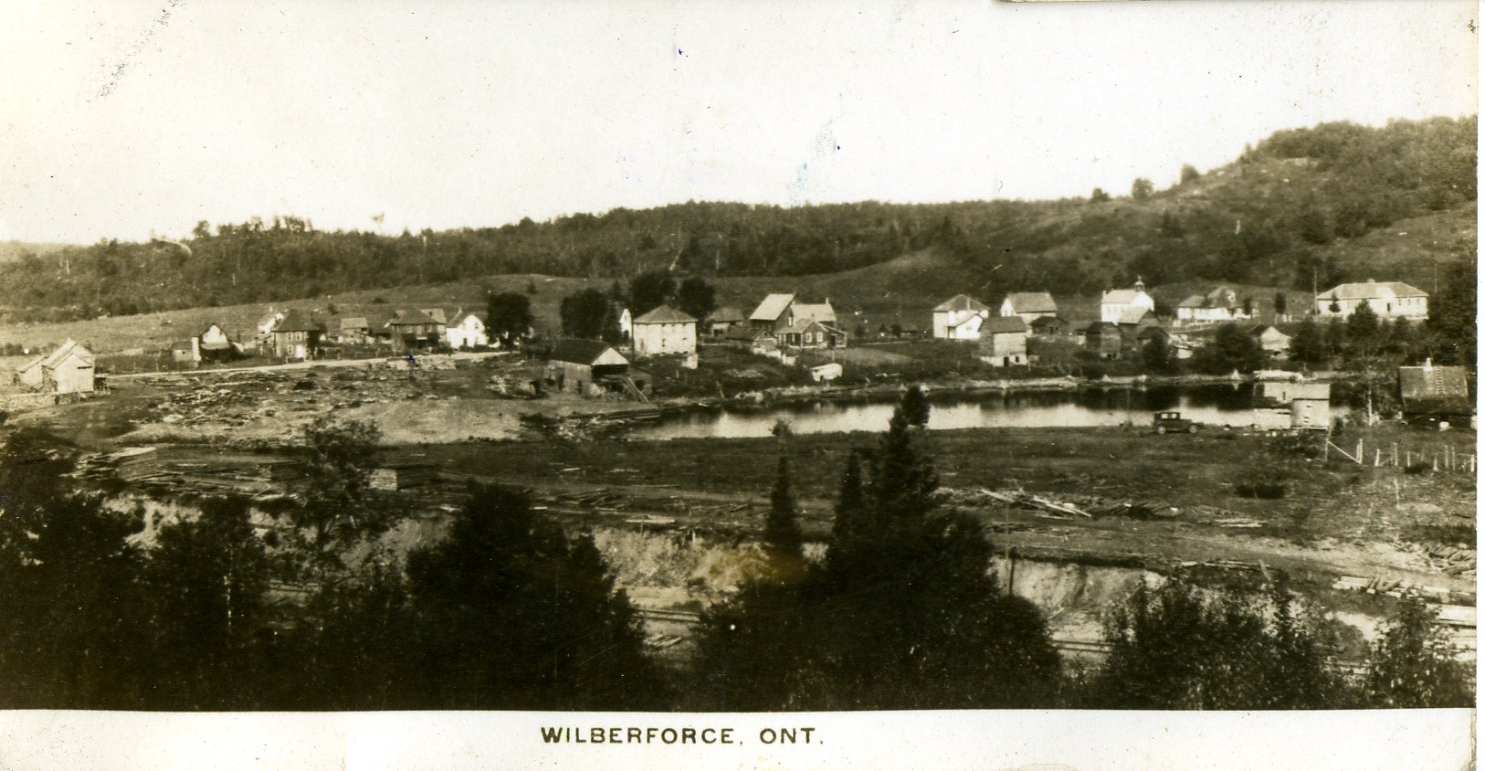
Wilberforce circa 1917

Wilberforce was established as "Pusey", a station on the IB&O Railway, and named for railway president Charles J. Pusey. This little railway had initially been built to carry iron ore from open pit mines at Irondale. Although the mines had closed, the railway had high hopes of extending to Bancroft, and even higher hopes of reaching Ottawa. At Wilberforce, where the railway skirted the southern shore of Pusey Lake (now Dark Lake), the Wilberforce Lumber Company put up a sawmill. In 1909 the Wilberforce mill was leased to James Lauder and Joseph Spears, of Toronto. The IB&O Railway was taken over by the Canadian Northern Railway in 1912. Messrs. Lauder and Spears along with Lucien B. Howland, (the former general manager of the IB&O), looking for new business opportunities, acquired a sawmill on the new CNR line north of Parry Sound, Ontario. The three men eventually established the community of Lost Channel in the Parry Sound District and went bankrupt in the process. Wilberforce is known among geocachers as the "Geocaching Capital of Canada." The first cache in the town was "Wilberforce be With You" placed by Geofellas.

=== Other communities ===
The township also contains the smaller communities of Cheddar (ghost town), Cope Falls, Deer Lake, Dyno Estates, Essonville, Harcourt, Highland Grove, Hotspur, Ironsides, Maxwells, Pusey, South Wilberforce, Tory Hill, Upper Paudash, Ursa and Ward. Highland Grove was home to "Camp Diamond", the site of a fabled, but unfounded diamond mine. The site was used as a hockey camp for a short period of time and later became an all girls summer recreational camp.

Highlands East has 5 fire halls located throughout the municipality, with stations located in Cardiff, Highland Grove, Gooderham, Wilberforce and Paudash. The Highlands East Fire Department only has one full-time employee, its fire chief, with all of the firefighters being volunteers.

== Demographics ==
In the 2021 Census of Population conducted by Statistics Canada, Highlands East had a population of 3,830 living in 1,875 of its 4,430 total private dwellings, a change of 14.6% from its 2016 population of 3,343. With a land area of 688.18 km^{2} (265.71 sq mi), it had a population density of 5.6/km^{2} (14.4/sq mi) in 2021.

Canada census – Highlands East community profile

	2021	2016	2011
Population	3,830 (+14.6% from 2016)	3,343 (+2.9% from 2011)	3,249 (+5.2% from 2006)
Land area	688.18 km^{2} (265.71 sq mi)	704.63 km^{2} (272.06 sq mi)	705.42 km^{2} (272.36 sq mi)
Population density	5.6/km^{2} (15/sq mi)	4.7/km^{2} (12/sq mi)	4.6/km^{2} (12/sq mi)
Median age	58.8 (M: 59.2, F: 58.8)	57.8 (M: 57.8, F: 57.9)
Private dwellings	4,430 (total) 1,875 (occupied)	4,485 (total)	4,374 (total)
Median household income	$63,600	$49,451

References: 2021 2016 2011

Historical census populations – Highlands East, Ontario
Year	Pop.	±%
2001	3,022	—
2006	3,089	+2.2%
2011	3,249	+5.2%
2016	3,343	+2.9%
2021	3,830	+14.6%
Population counts are not adjusted for boundary changes. Source: Statistics Canada

== Lakes ==
- Salerno Lake
- Paudash Lake
- Gooderham Lake previously Pine Lake
- Billings Lake previously Wolf Lake
- Lake Wilbermere (also known as South Wilberforce Lake)
- Glamour Lake previously Bear Lake or Big Bear Lake
- Stormy Lake
- Eels Lake

== See also ==
- Uranium mining in the Bancroft area
- List of townships in Ontario
