= Minden Hills =

- Township (lower-tier)
- Township of Minden Hills
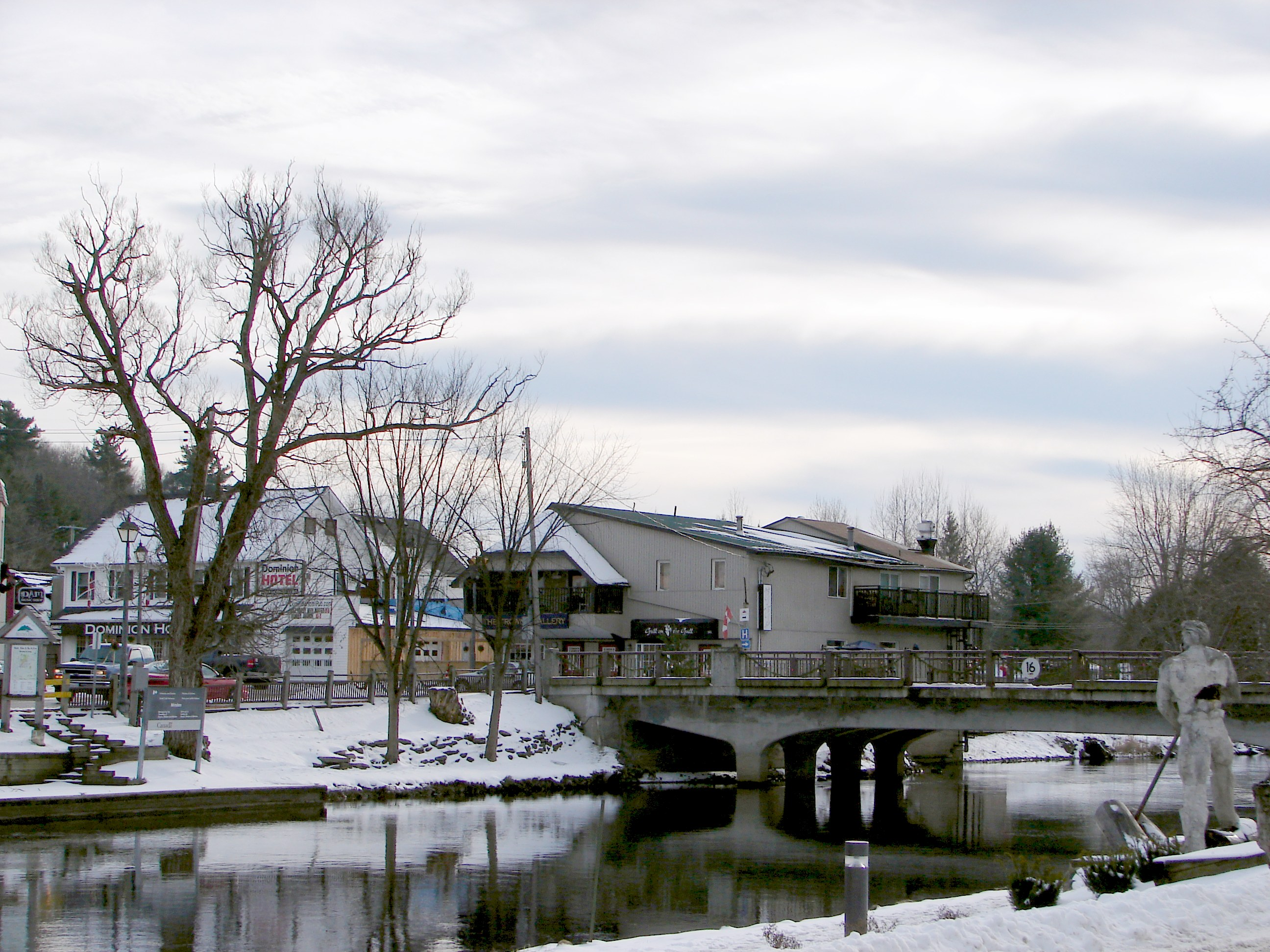
- Minden

- Logo

- Location within Haliburton County Location within Southern Ontario
- Coordinates: 44°56′N 78°44′W
- Country: Canada
- Province: Ontario
- County: Haliburton
- Settled: 1850s
- Formed: January 1, 2001

Government
  - Type: Township
  - Mayor: Bob Carter
  - Deputy Mayor: Lisa Schell
  - Fed. riding: Haliburton—Kawartha Lakes
  - Prov. riding: Haliburton—Kawartha Lakes—Brock

Area
  - Land: 847.37 km^{2} (327.17 sq mi)

Population (2021)
  - Total: 6,971
- Time zone: UTC-5 (EST)
  - Summer (DST): UTC-4 (EDT)
- Postal Code: K0M
- Area codes: 705, 249
- Website: www.mindenhills.ca

Minden Hills is a township in and the county seat of Haliburton County, Ontario, Canada. It is an amalgam of the townships of Snowdon, Lutterworth, Anson, Hindon and Minden. It is usually referred to as Minden, after its largest community.

The township was formed on January 1, 2001, through the merger of the Township of Anson, Hindon and Minden, the Township of Lutterworth, and the Township of Snowdon.

== Communities ==
The primary residential and commercial centre of the township is Minden, located just off Highway 35 (44°55′34″N 78°43′33″W).

The township also includes the smaller communities of:

- Blairhampton
- Brady Lake
- Buller
- Carnarvon
- Deep Bay
- Dutch Line
- Gelert
- Hindon Hill (abandoned community)
- Howland
- Ingoldsby
- Irondale
- Kilcoo Harbour
- Lochlin
- Lutterworth
- Miners Bay
- Moore Falls

=== Minden ===
Minden, named after a town in the North Rhine–Westphalia federal state in Germany, was first surveyed in 1858. Before that, the settlement was called Gull River. Settlers were first drawn to the region (via the Bobcaygeon Road, an original colonization road), because of its timber resources. The town lies on the banks of the Gull River and during the 19th and 20th centuries, loggers used the river to move timber to sawmills downstream.

Since the 1940s the town has become an increasingly popular summer destination given its close proximity to larger cities in southern Ontario. The population grows dramatically during the summer months as a result of tourism. The Minden Times and The Highlander are the local newspapers, and the local post office on Water St. serves residents with lock boxes and three rural routes.

The Minden Hills Cultural Centre is home to the Agnes Jamieson Gallery, named after Dr. Agnes Jamieson, the first female coroner in Ontario. The Gallery houses the largest known collection of André Lapine's work. Both Lapine and Jamieson lived in Minden during part of their lives. The Cultural Centre is also home to the Minden Hills Museum, which includes seven heritage buildings, including a school, a blacksmith shop and a church. R.D. Lawrence Place, an interactive learning centre celebrating Canadian author Ron Lawrence, is also located here.

== History ==
=== 2013 flood ===
The Gull River flooded in April 2013, leading to a state of emergency declaration on April 20. By May 3, officials were predicting another two weeks of abnormally high water levels in the Trent-Severn Waterway system. The excess water that was held back in the reservoir lakes north of Minden was being slowly released and moved through the village so as not to cause increased damage. The use of the reservoir lakes north of Minden to collect water was necessary to avert a threat to the essential utilities of water, hydro and sewage treatment. However, it extended the flood damage area north throughout the entire Gull River Watershed. Many of the properties on those lakes were damaged.

Residents of the area were evacuated from their homes on short notice and remained out until mid-May. Claims by residents to the Ontario Disaster Relief Assistance Program totaled 1.8 million dollars by November 2013, in addition to an estimated 2.2 million dollars in insured claims. The township spent $370,000 on flood related costs.

=== 2017 flood ===
Residents of Minden Hills were again affected by flooding only four years after the massive flood of 2013. Watershed flooding was at its maximum capacity in the reservoir lakes of the Trent Severn Waterway only to be hit with 129 millimeters of rain in late April, increasing flood levels. A state of emergency was put into place on May 6, 2017, for the town of Minden Hills. The Gull River through Minden recorded 5 centimeters lower than the record 2013 flood. A new automated sandbag machine was purchased earlier in March, helping with handling sandbags at a much faster rate for flood relief, with close to 40,000 sandbags being filled by the end of the weekend. Provincial aid was provided after Reeve Brent Devolin had been in contact with Premier Kathleen Wynne. The Ontario Disaster Relief Assistance Program offered reimbursement for homeowners affected.

=== 2015 Pan Am Games ===
Minden Wild Water Preserve was a venue of the 2015 Pan Am Games, hosting canoe events.

== Demographics ==
In the 2021 Census of Population conducted by Statistics Canada, Minden Hills had a population of 6,971 living in 3,229 of its 6,019 total private dwellings, a change of 14.5% from its 2016 population of 6,088. With a land area of 847.37 km^{2} (327.17 sq mi), it had a population density of 8.2/km^{2} (21.3/sq mi) in 2021.

Canada census – Minden Hills community profile

	2021	2016	2011
Population	6,971 (+14.5% from 2016)	6,088 (+7.7% from 2011)	5,655 (+1.8% from 2006)
Land area	847.37 km^{2} (327.17 sq mi)	878.27 km^{2} (339.10 sq mi)	878.17 km^{2} (339.06 sq mi)
Population density	8.2/km^{2} (21/sq mi)	6.9/km^{2} (18/sq mi)	6.4/km^{2} (17/sq mi)
Median age	58.8 (M: 58.4, F: 59.2)	56.9 (M: 56.6, F: 57.3)
Private dwellings	6,019 (total) 3,229 (occupied)	6,092 (total)	6,020 (total)
Median household income	$74,500	$58.935

References: 2021 2016 2011

Historical census populations – Minden Hills

Year	Pop.	±%
1996	5,336	—
2001	5,312	−0.4%
2006	5,556	+4.6%

Year	Pop.	±%
2011	5,655	+1.8%
2016	6,088	+7.7%
2021	6,971	+14.5%

Source: Statistics Canada

== Local government ==
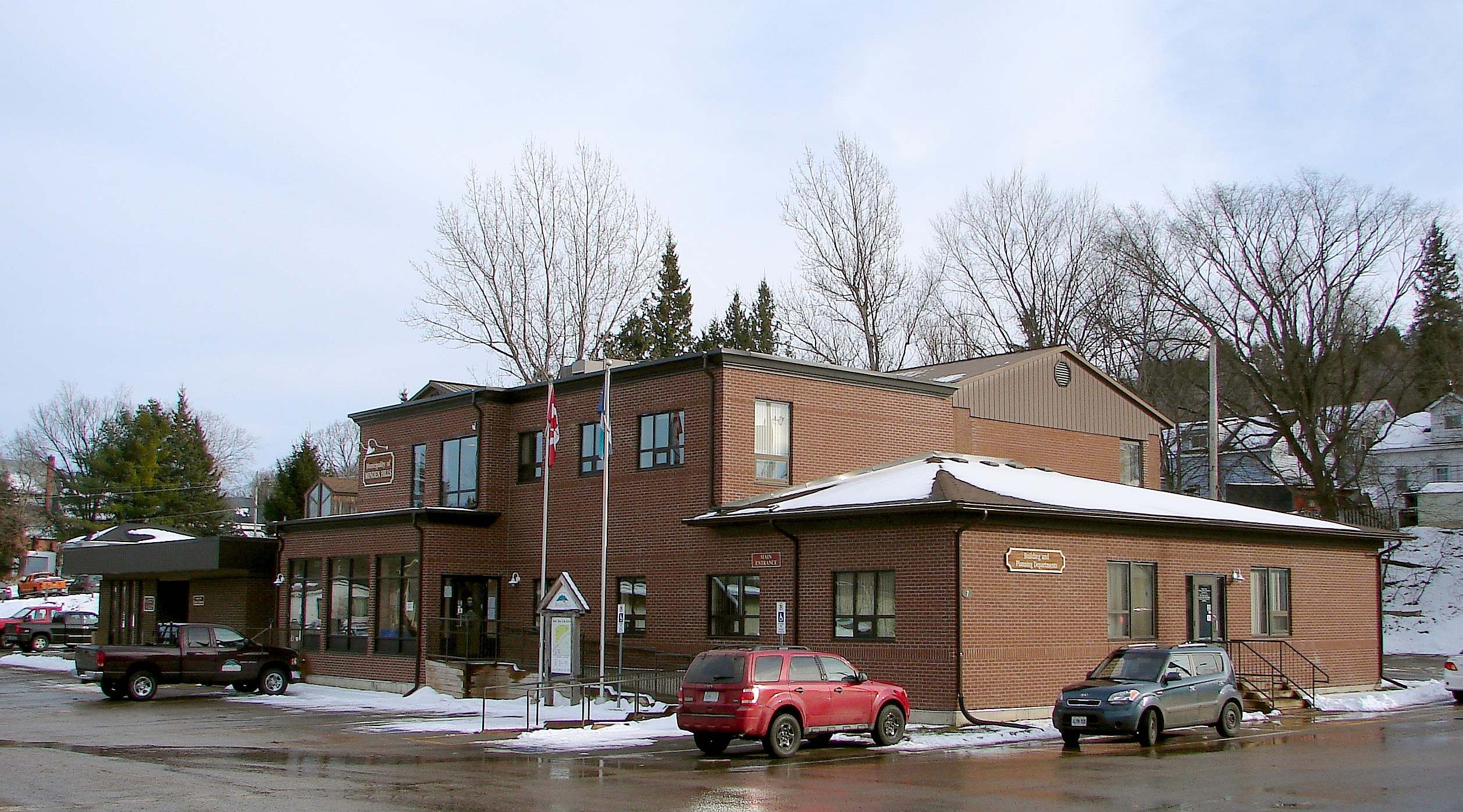
Municipal office in Minden

The town's council includes a mayor, deputy mayor, councillor at large and four councillors elected on the basis of two for Ward 1 and one each for Wards 2 & 3, who are elected to join the mayor at meetings of Minden Hills Council. The members of council elected in 2022 are:

- Mayor: Bob Carter
- Deputy Mayor: Lisa Schell
- Councillors:
  - At Large: Tammy McKelvey
  - Ward 1: Ivan Ingram
  - Ward 1: Shirley Johanessen
  - Ward 2: Pam Sayne
  - Ward 3: Bob Sisson

Minden Hills federal election results
Year	Liberal		Conservative		New Democratic		Green	
2021	25%	892	51%	1,861	14%	497	3%	120
2019	28%	966	47%	1,615	13%	433	11%	379

Minden Hills provincial election results
Year	PC		New Democratic		Liberal		Green	
2022	50%	1,184	14%	318	14%	326	11%	257
2018	56%	1,594	29%	823	9%	250	4%	120

== Transportation ==
Ontario Highway 35 is the major thoroughfare passing to the east and connects Minden to neighbouring areas and beyond.

A Heliport servicing Minden Hospital is the only airport in Minden. The closest airport is south in Peterborough, Ontario.

== Services ==
Minden Hospital provides local health needs, with more advance care to the south in Peterborough or to the north-west in Bracebridge, Ontario.

Ontario Provincial Police Haliburton Detachment is located in Minden.

Fire services is provided by Minden Hills Fire Department and ambulance by Haliburton County Em's, both located along highway 35.

== See also ==
- List of townships in Ontario
