= Kinmount =

Coordinates: 44°47′N 78°39′W

- Unincorporated community
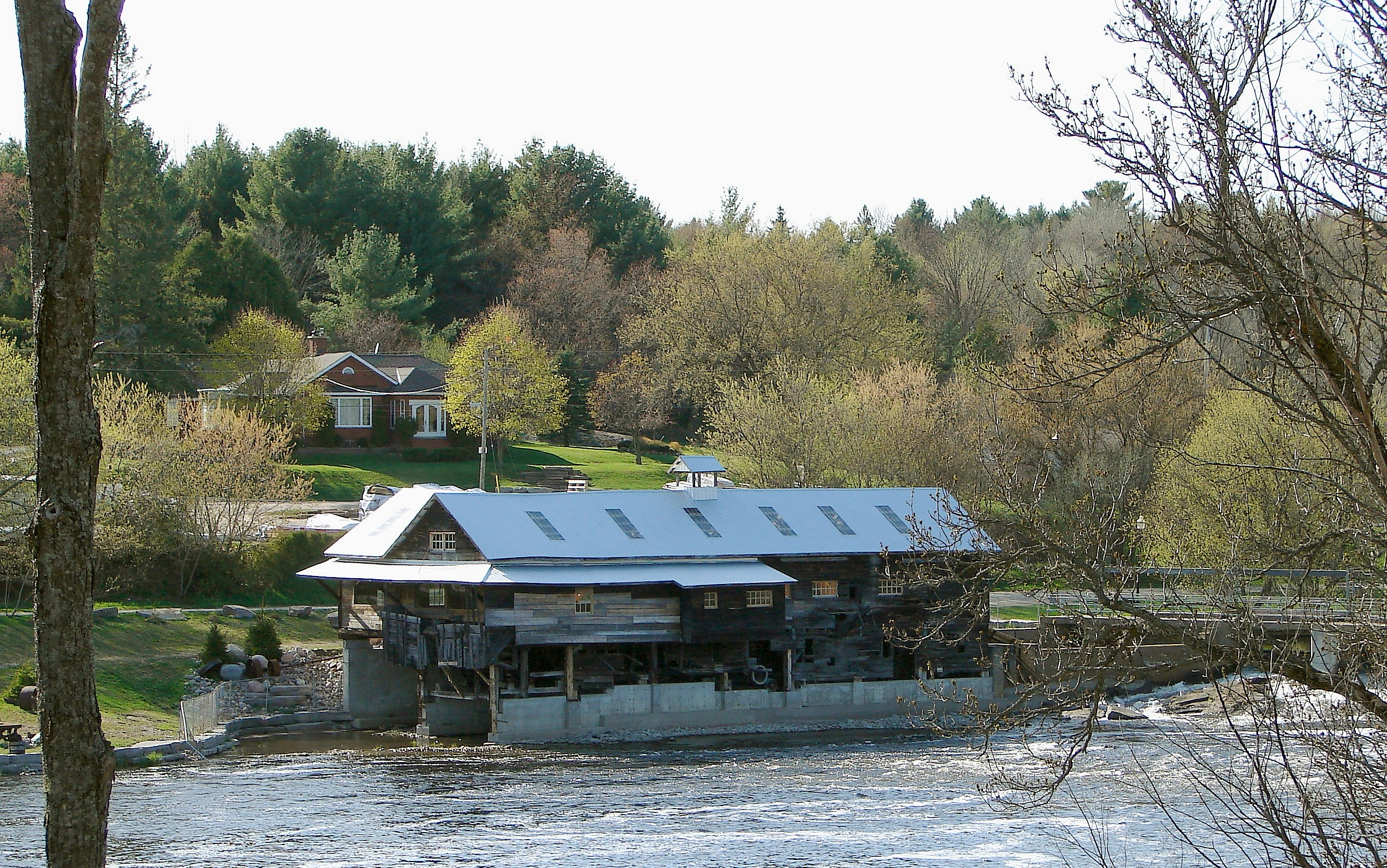
- The old mill on the Burnt River
- Interactive map of Kinmount
- Country: Canada
- Province: Ontario
- Time zone: UTC−5 (EST)
  - Summer (DST): UTC−4 (EDT)
- Forward sortation area: K0M 2A0

Kinmount is a village with a population of approximately 500, located on the Burnt River in Ontario, Canada. The village is apportioned by three municipalities, they are, City of Kawartha Lakes, Minden Hills and Trent Lakes. The village's hinterland covers large sections of both Haliburton and Peterborough counties for which it is a shopping and cultural centre. Prior to the formation of the City of Kawartha Lakes, Kinmount was the seat of Somerville Township.

== Economy ==
The economy of Kinmount once relied on forestry but is now primarily based on tourism. The village is an important source of supplies for summer cottagers in the area and, consequently, becomes nearly dormant in winter.

One of Kinmount's primary businesses and tourist draws is the Highland Cinemas — a first-run movie theatre with five screening rooms, and a museum of movie posters, projection equipment, and memorabilia. The theater and owner Keith Stata are featured in the 2024 documentary film The Movie Man.

The local post office, at 4078 County Rd 121, offers lock boxes and services one rural delivery route.

== History ==
Kinmount was originally named Burnt River Crossing (a name now used by a nearby village), after the river which flows through the village. In 1859, it was renamed Kinmount by Mrs. Malcolm Bell, after Kinmount, Scotland.

Kinmount is notable for being one of the first sites of Icelandic settlement in Canada. Although the group moved to Manitoba after a year, their story is told and their presence commemorated by an Ontario Historical Plaque. A memorial paying tribute to these early settlers was erected there in September 2000. Over 500 people gathered for the dedication including the Foreign Minister of Iceland and the Deputy Prime Minister of Canada.

The Victoria Railway connected Kinmount with Lindsay and Haliburton. The line was absorbed by Canadian National Railways as the Haliburton subdivision. Passenger service ceased in 1960, freight service ended in 1978 and the line was abandoned in 1981.

Kinmount most recently gained national attention in the summer of 2004, when it became the first Ontario village to actively canvass a family physician to move to the community. The grass-roots campaign included leaflets, posters, and newspaper ads throughout the province.

== Attractions ==
The Kinmount Fair is held annually on the Labour Day weekend. Another place to visit is Kinmount Station Model Railway and Heritage Museum. Highlands Cinemas is a venerable, much loved gathering place — it is the subject, along with its owner Keith Stata, of the documentary “The Movie Man.”

== See also ==
- List of communities in Ontario
