= Mitchell =

Mitchell may refer to:

== People and fictional characters ==
- Mitchell (surname), including lists of both people and fictional characters
- Mitchell (given name), lists of people and fictional characters

== Places ==
=== Australia ===
- Mitchell, Australian Capital Territory, a light-industrial estate
- Mitchell, New South Wales, a suburb of Bathurst
- Mitchell, Northern Territory, a suburb of Palmerston
- Mitchell, Queensland, a town
- Mitchell, South Australia, on lower Eyre Peninsula
- Mitchell County, New South Wales
- Division of Mitchell, a federal electoral division in north-west Sydney, New South Wales
- Electoral district of Mitchell (Queensland), a former electoral district
- Electoral district of Mitchell (South Australia), a state electoral district
- Electoral district of Mitchell (Western Australia) a state electoral district
- Shire of Mitchell, a local government area in Victoria
- Lake Mitchell (Queensland), Australia

=== Canada ===
- Mitchell, Ontario
- Mitchell, Manitoba, an unincorporated community
- Mitchell Island, British Columbia
- Mitchell Island (Nunavut)
- Mitchell Lake (Ontario), Canada, an artificial lake
- Mitchell Lake (Apica River), Quebec, Canada

=== United Kingdom ===
- Mitchell, Cornwall, a village
- Mitchell (UK Parliament constituency)

=== United States ===
- Mitchell, Colorado, an unincorporated community
- Mitchell, Georgia, a town
- Mitchell, Illinois, an unincorporated census-designated place
- Mitchell, Indiana, a city
- Mitchell, Iowa, a city
- Mitchell, Kansas, an unincorporated community
- Mitchell, Missouri, an unincorporated community
- Mitchell, Nebraska, a city
- Mitchell, Oregon, a city
- Mitchell, South Dakota, a city
- Mitchell, South Dakota micropolitan area, anchored by the city
- Mitchell, West Virginia, an unincorporated community
- Mitchell, Wisconsin, a town
- Mitchell Township (disambiguation)
- Mitchell Mesa, in Monument Valley, Arizona
- Mitchel Range, a mountain range in California
- Mitchell County (disambiguation)
- Mitchell Lake (disambiguation)
- Lake Mitchell (disambiguation)

=== In multiple countries ===
- Mitchell Park (disambiguation)
- Mitchell River (disambiguation)
- Mount Mitchell (disambiguation)

=== Elsewhere ===
- Mitchells Plain, South Africa
- Mitchell (crater), on the Moon

== Companies ==
- Mitchell Camera Corporation, which manufactured the cameras which shot the majority of Hollywood movies and early television shows from the 1930s-1990s
- Mitchell Construction, a UK-based contractor
- Mitchell Corporation, a Japanese video game company
- Mitchell Electronics, an American manufacturer of electronic devices
- Mitchell International, a software and information service provider, located in San Diego, California
- Mitchell (automobile), manufactured in Racine, Wisconsin, from 1903 to 1923
- Mitchell (fishing), fishing reel brand owned by Pure Fishing (a division of Sycamore Partners)

== Military ==
- North American B-25 Mitchell, an American World War II bomber
- Mitchel Air Force Base, a former Air Force Base on the Hempstead Plains of Long Island, New York
- USS Mitchell, several ships
- HMS Hoste (K566), a Royal Navy frigate originally named Mitchell
- Fort Mitchell, Nebraska, an Army fort in service from 1864 to 1867, near present-day Scottsbluff, Nebraska
- Fort Mitchell (South Carolina), an American Civil War fortification and historic site
- Fort Mitchel (disambiguation)
- Castlebar Military Barracks, sometimes called Mitchel Barracks, a former military installation in Castlebar, County Mayo, Ireland

== Schools ==
- Mitchell College, a private college in New London, Connecticut
- Mitchell Community College, Statesville, North Carolina
- Mitchell High School (disambiguation)
- Mitchell School, Mitchell, Oregon

== Sports ==
- Castlebar Mitchels GAA, a Gaelic Athletic Association club based in the Castlebar area in County Mayo, Ireland
- Mitchell Bowl, one of the two semifinal bowls of Canadian Interuniversity Sport men's football
- Mitchel Athletic Complex, Uniondale, New York, United States, on the site of the decommissioned Mitchel Air Force Base
- Mitchell Center, a multi-purpose arena on the campus of the University of South Alabama in Mobile

== Transportation ==
- Mitchell Freeway, Western Australia
- Mitchell Highway, Australia
- Milwaukee Mitchell International Airport, near Milwaukee, Wisconsin, United States
- Mitchell Municipal Airport, near Mitchell, South Dakota, United States

== Other uses ==
- USC&GS Mitchell, a United States Coast and Geodetic Survey launch in commission from 1919 to 1944
- Mitchell (film), a 1975 action film
- Mitchell movement, a type of duplicate bridge table movement
- Mitchell Scholarship, given annually by the US-Ireland Alliance
- The Mitchell Trio, or The Chad Mitchell Trio, North American vocal group who became known during the 1960s
- List of storms named Mitchell, names a tropical cyclones of the Australian region

== See also ==
- Mitchellville (disambiguation)
