= West Haven-Sylvan, Oregon =

- Census-designated place
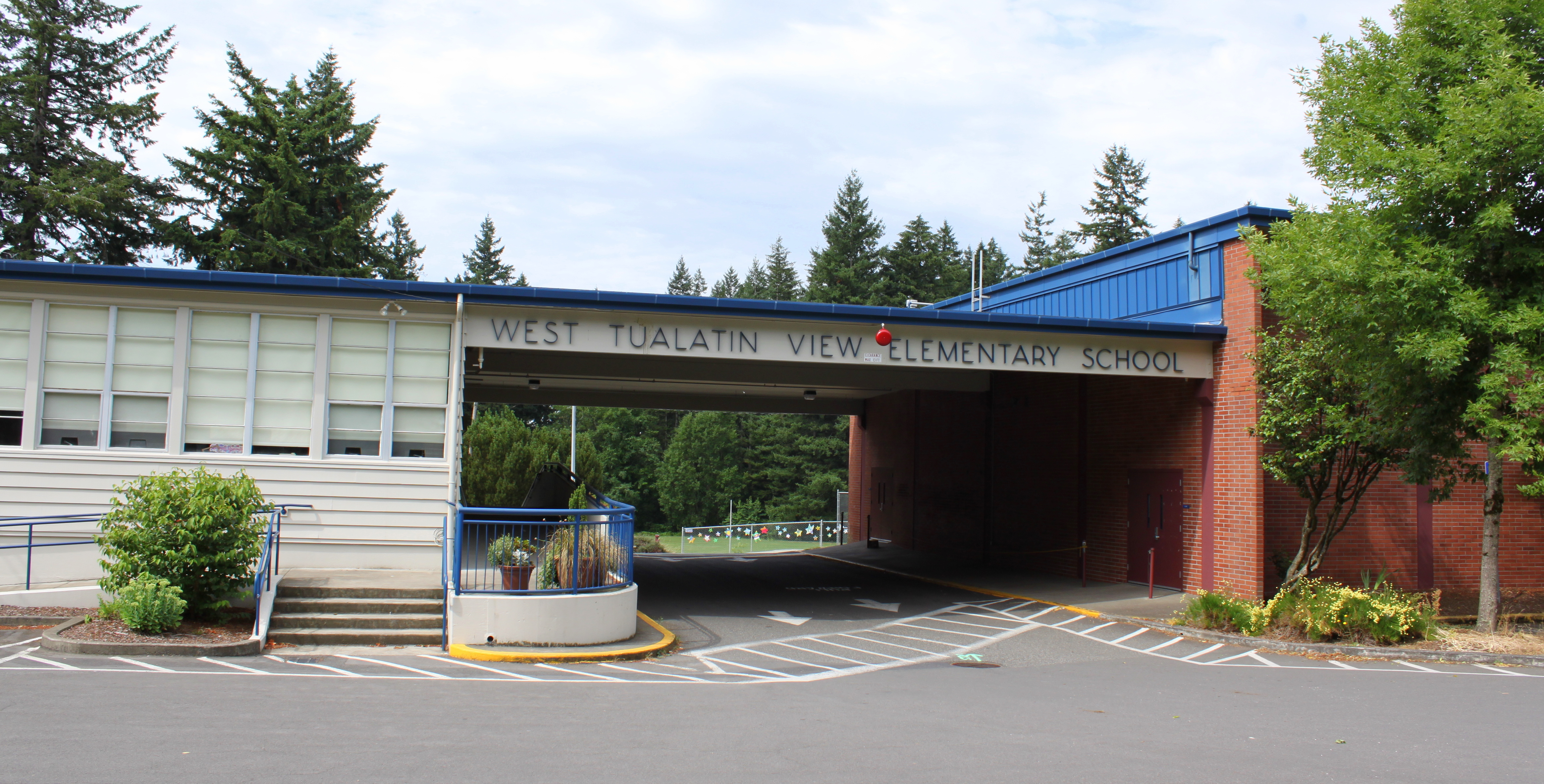
- West Tualatin View Elementary School

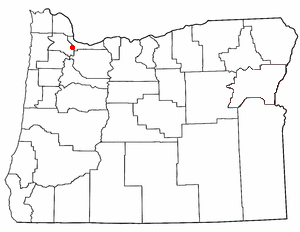
- Location in Oregon
- Coordinates: 45°30′56″N 122°45′50″W
- Country: United States
- State: Oregon
- Counties: Washington; Multnomah

Area
  - Total: 2.24 sq mi (5.8 km^{2})
  - Land: 2.24 sq mi (5.8 km^{2})
  - Water: 0.00 sq mi (0 km^{2})
- Elevation: 591 ft (180 m)

Population (2020)
  - Total: 9,299
  - Density: 4,109.0/sq mi (1,586.51/km^{2})
- Time zone: UTC-8 (Pacific (PST))
  - Summer (DST): UTC-7 (PDT)
- ZIP Codes: 97225, 97229 (Portland)
- FIPS code: 41-80025
- GNIS feature ID: 2409550

West Haven-Sylvan is an unincorporated area and census-designated place (CDP) in Washington and Multnomah counties, Oregon, United States, north of U.S. Route 26. As of the 2020 census, the CDP population was 9,299, up from 8,001 in 2010.

== History ==
In 1850, Nathan B. Jones, a pioneer of 1847, settled at the head of Tanner Creek and platted lots for a community he called "Zion Town". It is unknown if he named the place for Mount Zion, a summit located about a mile to the southeast. Because the name "Zion" for a local post office would have caused confusion, as there had already been two post offices so-named in Oregon, a resident suggested the name "Sylvan", from Silvanus, the Roman deity of the woods. The office was established in 1890 and closed in 1906. Jones, who was considered an eccentric hermit, had wanted Zion Town to become the new capital of Oregon. He was murdered during the course of a robbery in 1894. The Sylvan post office was located at what today is the interchange of Sunset Highway, Scholls Ferry Road and Skyline Boulevard within the Portland city limits in Multnomah County.

== Geography ==
West Haven-Sylvan is located along the eastern edge of Washington County, with a small portion extending east into Multnomah County. It is partially bordered to the east by the city of Portland, and the Beaverton city limits form the southern and western borders of the community. Unincorporated Cedar Mill borders West Haven-Sylvan to the northwest.

U.S. Route 26 (Sunset Highway) passes just south of the CDP, within the Beaverton city limits; the highway leads east 5 miles (8 km) to downtown Portland and northwest 73 miles (117 km) to Seaside. According to the U.S. Census Bureau, the West Haven-Sylvan CDP has a total area of 2.24 square miles (5.80 km^{2}), all land. Nearly all of the community drains west into tributaries of Beaverton Creek, part of the Tualatin River watershed leading south and east to the Willamette River at West Linn. The easternmost corner of the community drains south toward Fanno Creek, a south-flowing tributary of the Tualatin.

== Demographics ==
Historical population
Census	Pop.	Note	%±
1990	6,009		—
2000	7,147		18.9%
2010	8,001		11.9%
2020	9,299		16.2%
U.S. Decennial Census

As of the census of 2000, there were 7,147 people, 3,395 households, and 1,738 families residing in the CDP. The population density was 2,673.9 inhabitants per square mile (1,032.4/km^{2}). There were 3,572 housing units at an average density of 1,336.4 units per square mile (516.0 units/km^{2}). The racial makeup of the CDP was 89.45% White, 1.18% African American, 0.50% Native American, 5.40% Asian, 0.11% Pacific Islander, 1.06% from other races, and 2.29% from two or more races. Hispanic or Latino of any race were 2.84% of the population.

There were 3,395 households, out of which 20.5% had children under the age of 18 living with them, 44.3% were married couples living together, 4.8% had a female householder with no husband present, and 48.8% were non-families. 36.6% of all households were made up of individuals, and 7.2% had someone living alone who was 65 years of age or older. The average household size was 2.09 and the average family size was 2.81.

The CDP's age distribution is 17.6% under the age of 18, 9.8% from 18 to 24, 33.3% from 25 to 44, 28.0% from 45 to 64, and 11.3% who were 65 years of age or older. The median age was 38 years. For every 100 females, there were 97.5 males. For every 100 females age 18 and over, there were 96.3 males.

The median income for a household in the CDP was $56,286, and the median income for a family was $82,928. Males had a median income of $53,641 versus $41,169 for females. The per capita income for the CDP was $39,055. About 2.0% of families and 4.7% of the population were below the poverty line, including 2.0% of those under age 18 and 7.5% of those age 65 or over.

== Parks and recreation ==
Parks in this area include:

- Merritt Woods Natural Area
- Mitchell Park
- Roger Tilbury Memorial Park
- Sunset Hills Memorial Park
- Tualatin Hills Park

== Infrastructure ==
Fire protection and EMS services are provided through Tualatin Valley Fire and Rescue. Providence St. Vincent Medical Center is within the area.

== Education ==
Within Washington County, the school district covering most of the CDP is Beaverton School District 48J, while Portland School District 1J covers a small portion to the southeast. All parts of the CDP in Multnomah County are in Portland School District 1J. Zoned schools for portions in the Beaverton School District are West Tualatin View Elementary School (in the CDP), Cedar Park Middle School, and Beaverton High School. Areas in the Portland school district are zoned to Bridlemile Elementary School, West Sylvan Middle School, and Lincoln High School.

Catlin Gabel School is within the CDP.
