= Canal Lake =

Lake in southern Ontario, Canada

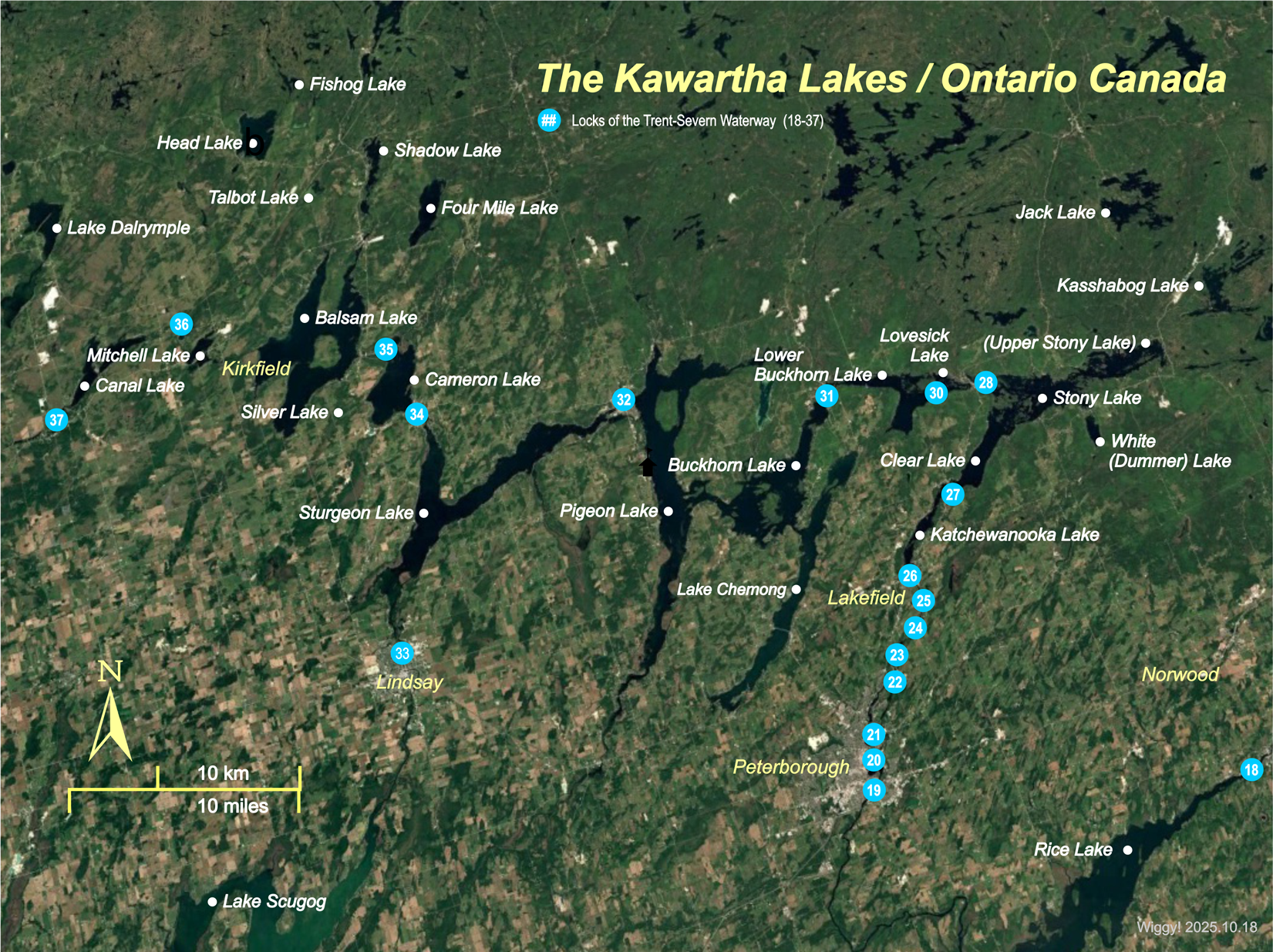
- The Kawartha Lakes and the Trent Severn Waterway; Canal Lake in the upper left quadrant

- Location within Ontario
- Location: Kawartha Lakes, Ontario, Canada
- Coordinates: 44°34′03″N 79°02′37″W
- Primary inflows: Talbot River
- Primary outflows: Talbot River
- Max. length: 8.4 km (5.2 mi)
- Max. width: 2.6 km (1.6 mi)
- Surface area: 8.64 km^{2} (2,136 acres)
- Average depth: 1.35 to 4.57 m (4.44 to 15 ft)
- Max. depth: 4.6 m (15 ft)

Canal Lake is a lake of Ontario, Canada, situated in the City of Kawartha Lakes. The lake is triangular, roughly 8.4 kilometres (5.2 mi) long and 2.6 kilometres (1.6 mi) at its widest point, with an area of 2,136 acres (864 ha). The depth ranges from 4.44 feet (1.35 m) to a max depth of 15 feet (4.6 m). Canal Lake is a medium size lake that had a large diversity of fishing spots. It has been over-fished, making it very difficult to fish.

Canal Lake is the most north-western of the Kawartha Lakes, located between Kirkfield on the east and Bolsover to the west. It is the first lake east of Lake Simcoe, connected by the Talbot River which also connects the lake to Mitchell and Balsam Lakes to the east. It is located between Lock #37 Bolsover and Lock #36 Kirkfield Lift Lock of the Trent–Severn Waterway.

Water levels are controlled. In the winter, Canal Lake has levels reduced by 3 feet (0.91 m) for shoreline maintenance. The levels are raised up again in the Spring.

Nearby towns include Beaverton, Fenelon Falls, Lindsay, and Bobcaygeon.

== Historic sites and monuments ==
The "Hole in the Wall" bridge was built in 1905 and is also known as the Canal Lake Concrete Arch Bridge. It was designed by the federal Department of Railways and Canals. It is located on Centennial Park Road on the southwest side of the Trent Severn Waterway bridge, northeast of Bolsover. The bridge was designated a National Historic Site of Canada in 1988.

== Fishing ==
There was a variety of fish available including largemouth bass, pike and muskellunge (muskie) and an abundance of panfish.Over fishing has led to Canal Lake’s demise as a quality lake.

== See also ==
- List of lakes in Ontario
