= Gray Whiskers =

Butte in Navajo County, Arizona, United States

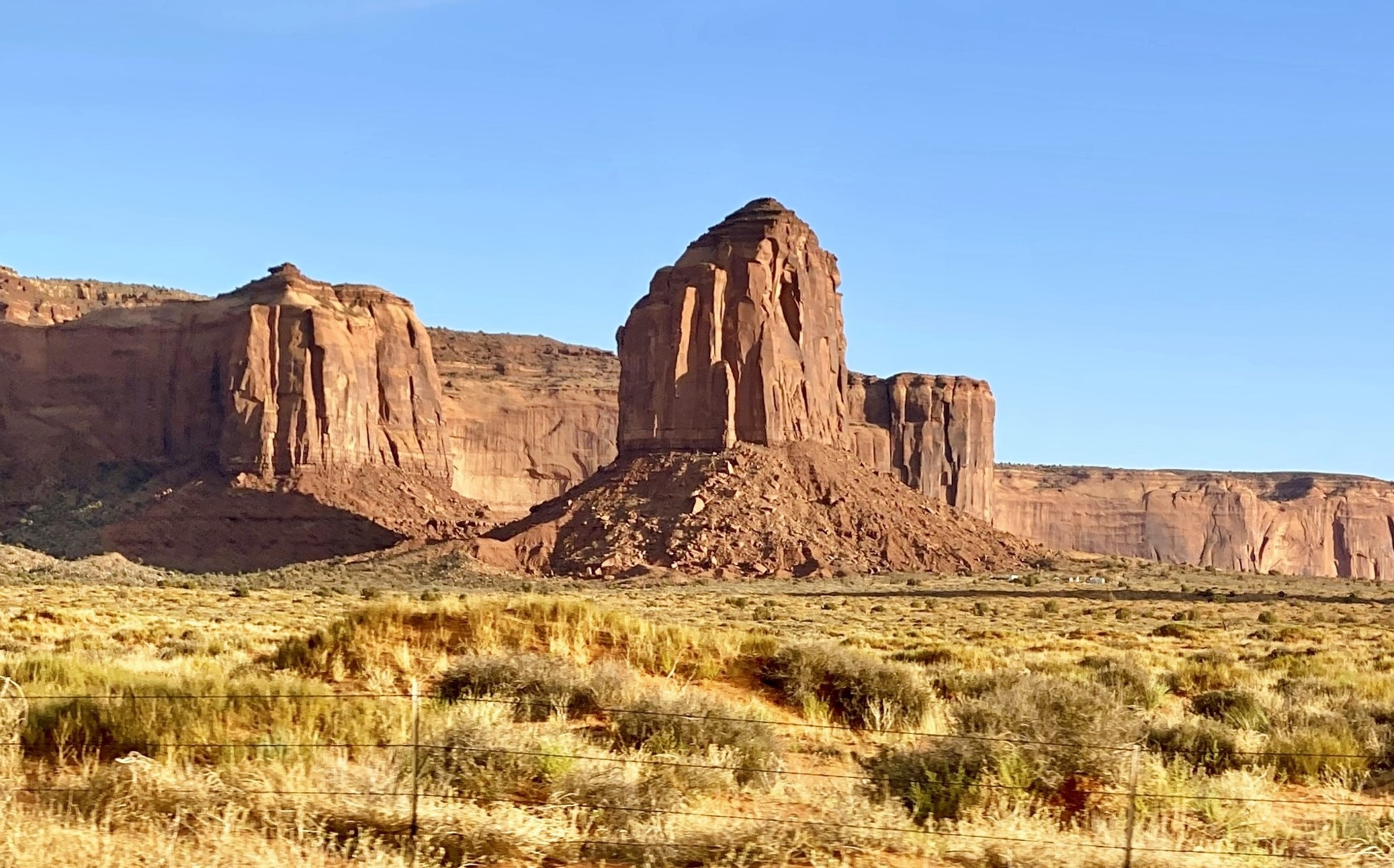
- North aspect, centered

Highest point
- Elevation: 6,385 ft (1,946 m)
- Prominence: 715 ft (218 m)
- Parent peak: Mitchell Mesa (6,586 ft)
- Isolation: 1.53 mi (2.46 km)
- Coordinates: 36°58′07″N 110°08′13″W

Geography
- Location within Arizona Location within the United States
- Location: Navajo Reservation; Navajo County, Arizona, U.S.
- Parent range: Colorado Plateau
- Topo map: USGS Mystery Valley

Geology
- Mountain type: Butte
- Rock type: Sandstone

Climbing
- First ascent: July 7, 1984, by Banditos

Gray Whiskers is a 6,385-foot-elevation (1,946-meter) summit in Navajo County, Arizona, United States.

== Description ==
Gray Whiskers is situated 1.6 miles (2.6 km) southwest of the Monument Valley visitor center on Navajo Nation land and can be seen from Highway 163. Precipitation runoff from this butte's slopes drains to Mitchell Butte Wash and Oljeto Wash which are part of the San Juan River drainage basin. Topographic relief is significant as the summit rises over 800 feet (244 meters) above the surrounding terrain in 0.15 mile (0.24 km). The nearest higher neighbor is Mitchell Mesa, 1.5 miles (2.4 km) to the east. The landform's toponym has been officially adopted by the U.S. Board on Geographic Names. The toponym is a translation of Navajo "dághaa' libáí" which means gray whiskers. The butte is named after a Navajo Hataałii (medicine man) who was instrumental in creating the Monument Valley Tribal Park in 1958.

== Geology ==
Gray Whiskers is composed of three principal strata. The bottom layer is slope-forming Organ Rock Shale, the next stratum is cliff-forming De Chelly Sandstone, and the upper layer is Moenkopi Formation. The rock ranges in age from Permian at the bottom to Triassic at the top. The buttes and mesas of Monument Valley are the result of the Organ Rock Shale being more easily eroded than the overlaying sandstone.

== Climate ==
Spring and fall are the most favorable seasons to visit Gray Whiskers. According to the Köppen climate classification system, it is located in a semi-arid climate zone with cold winters and hot summers. Summers average 54 days above 90 °F (32 °C) annually, and highs rarely exceed 100 °F (38 °C). Summer nights are comfortably cool, and temperatures drop quickly after sunset. Winters are cold, but daytime highs are usually above freezing. Winter temperatures below 0 °F (−18 °C) are uncommon, though possible. This desert climate receives less than 10 inches (250 millimeters) of annual rainfall, and snowfall is generally light during the winter.

== Gallery ==
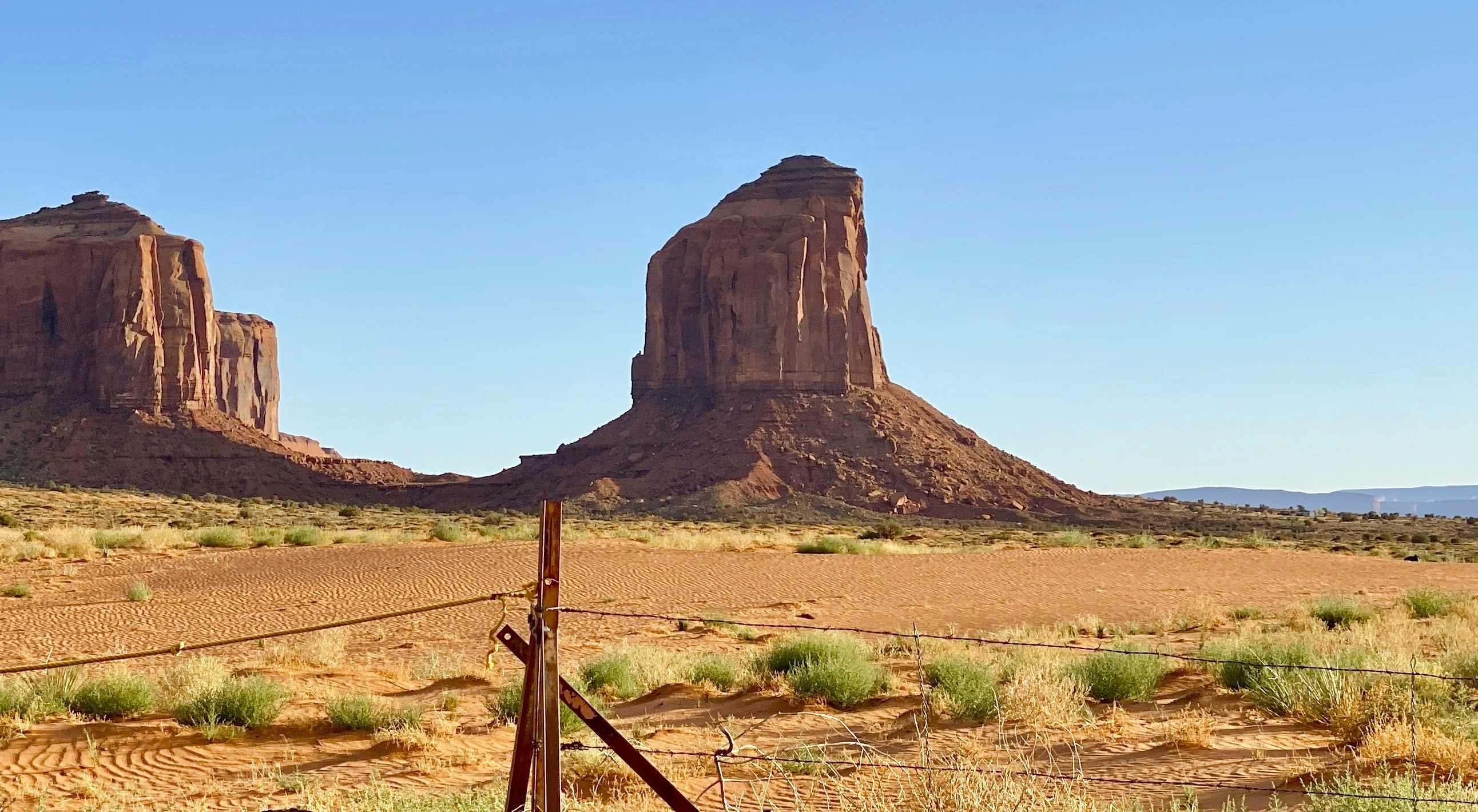
Northeast aspect

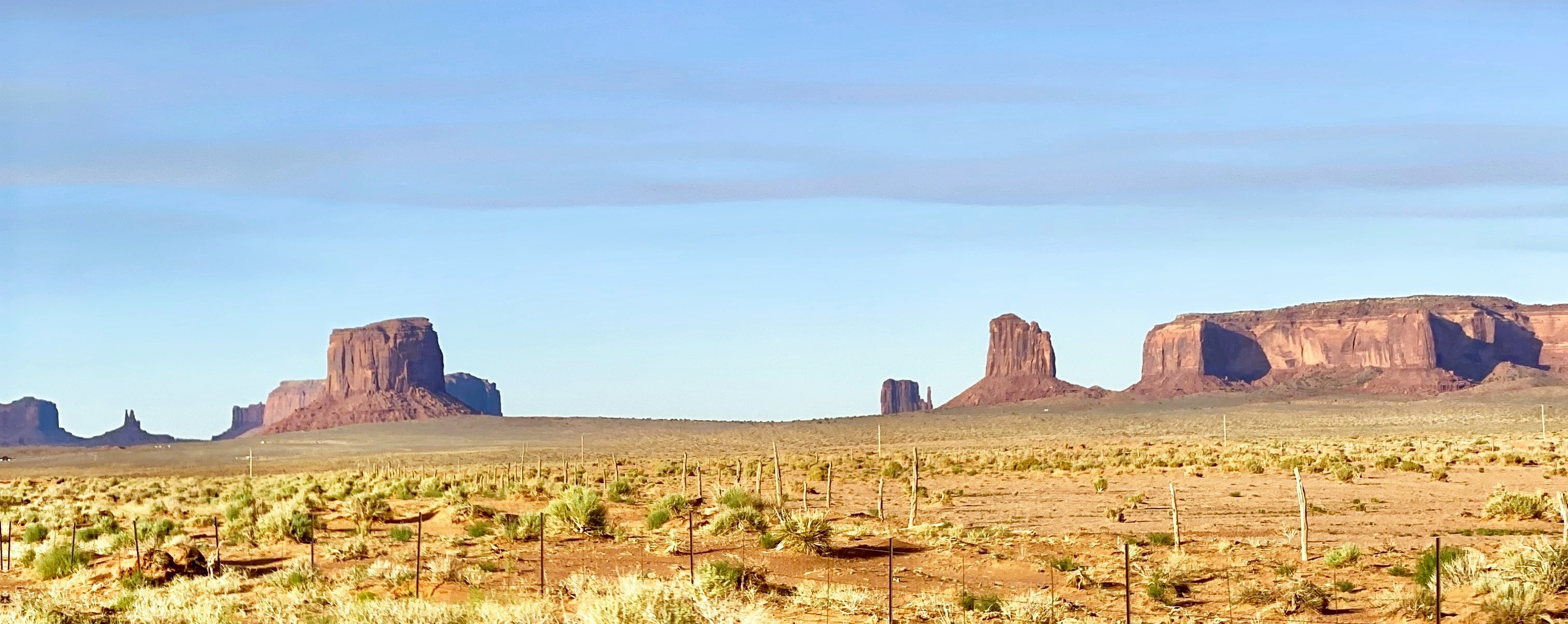
Gray Whiskers to right, next to the broader Mitchell Mesa at far right.
View is from WSW along Highway 163.

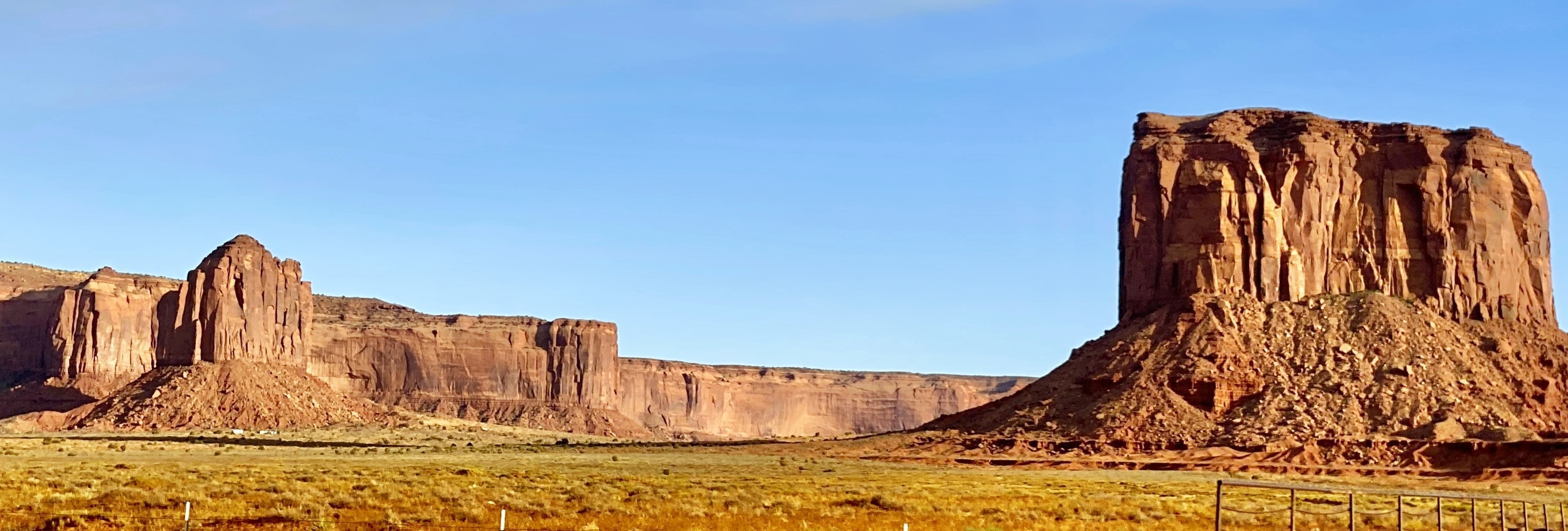
Gray Whiskers to left with Mitchell Mesa behind, and Mitchell Butte to the right.

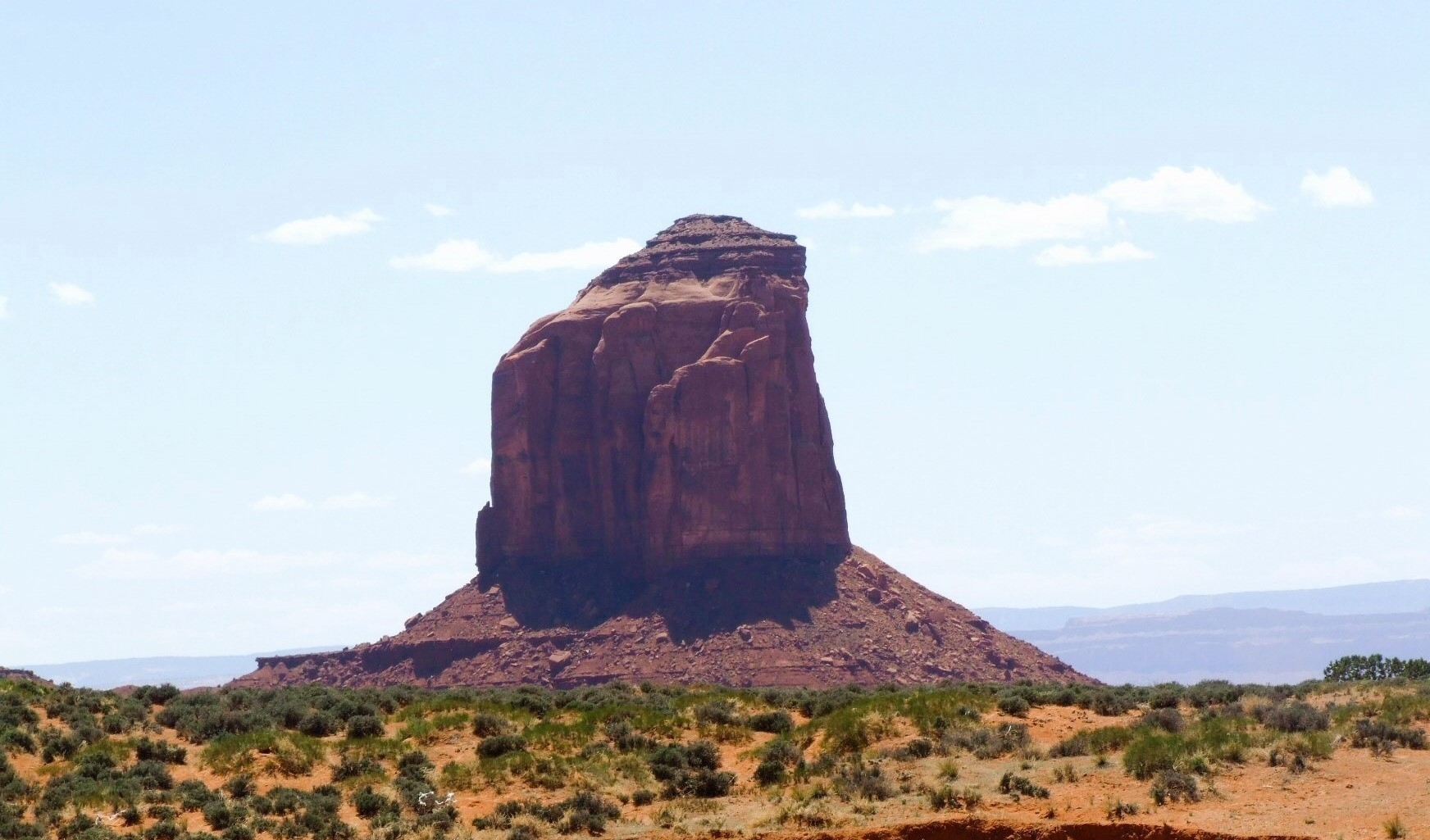
Gray Whiskers from the visitor center

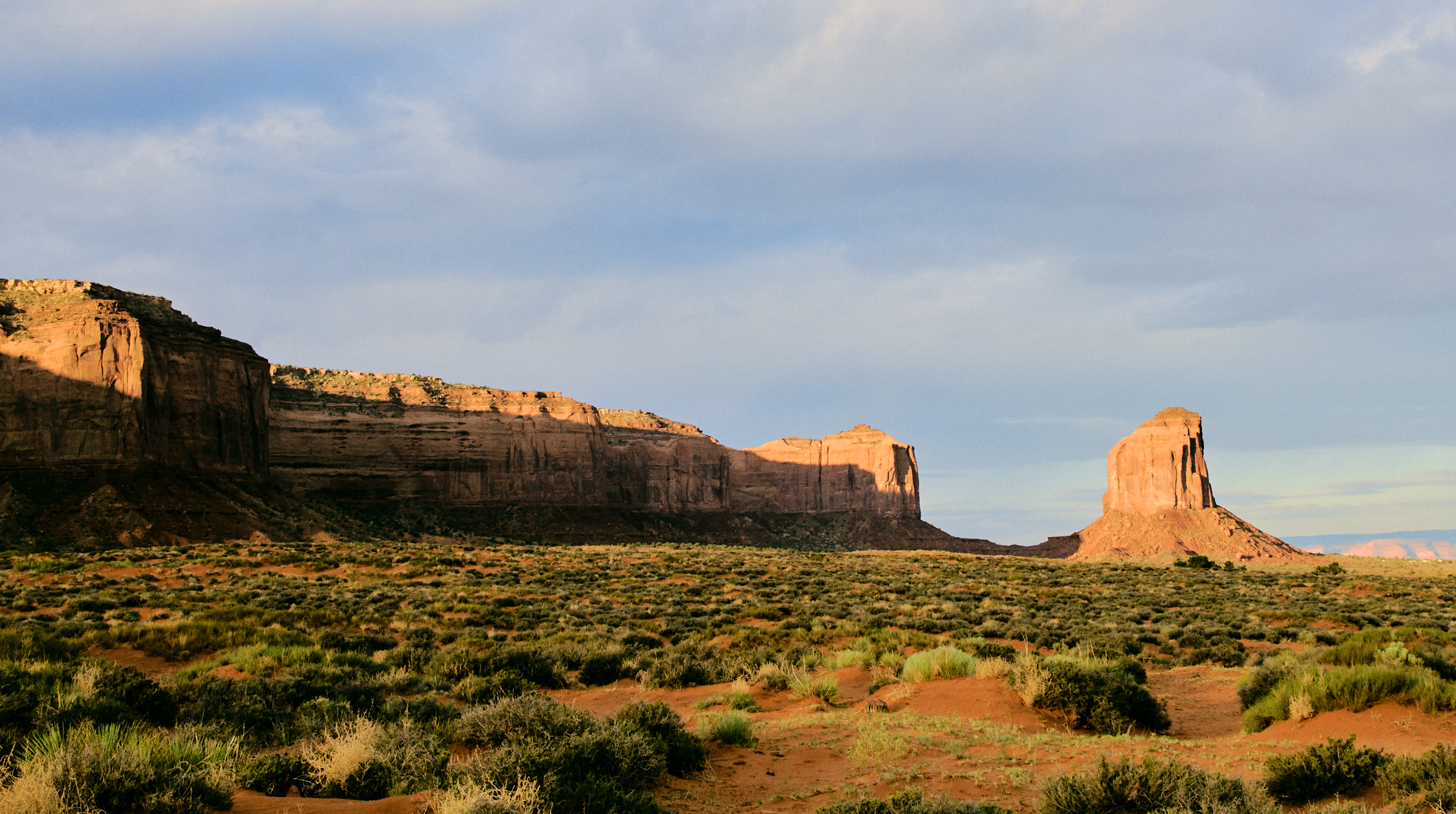
Gray Whiskers to right with the broader Mitchell Mesa to left

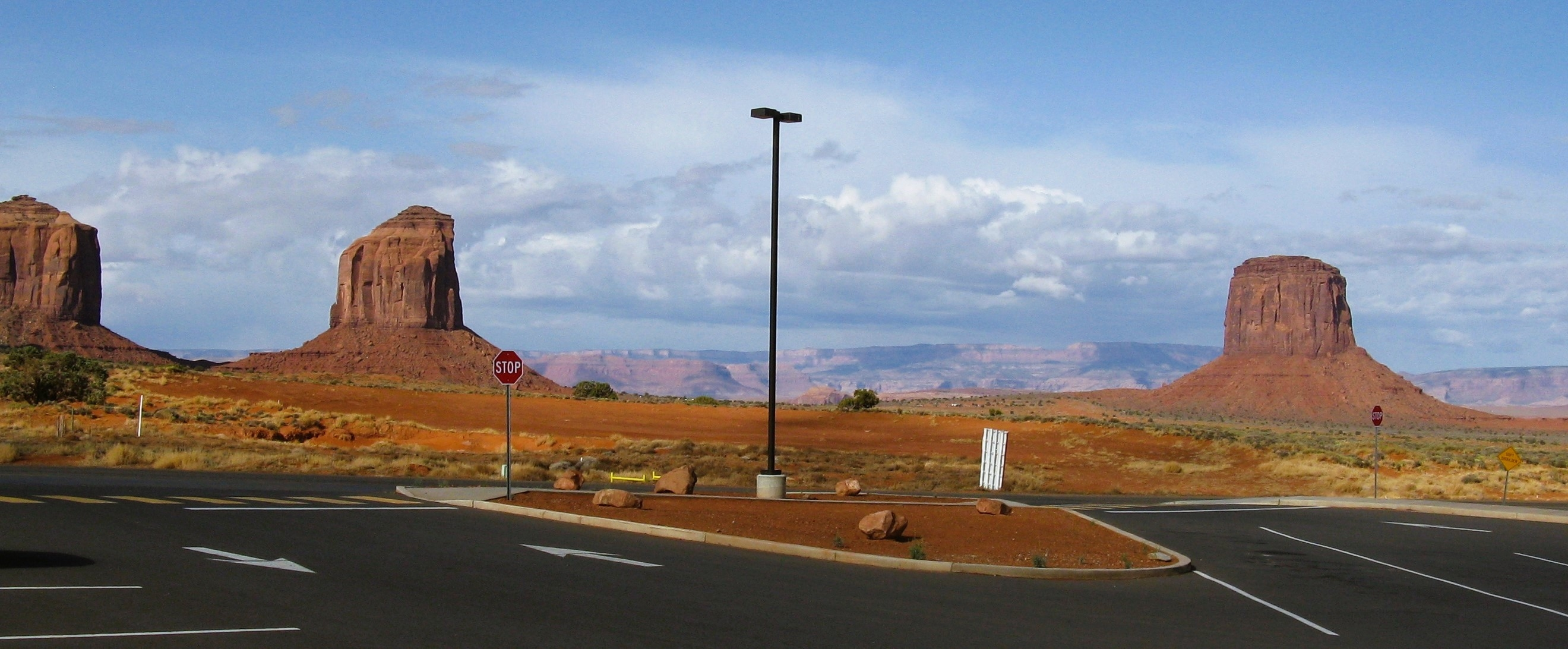
The view from Monument Valley Visitor Center parking lot looking west-southwest at Gray Whiskers (left) and Mitchell Butte (right).

== See also ==
- List of mountains in Arizona
- List of appearances of Monument Valley in the media
