= Lake Mitchell =

Lake Mitchell is the name of the following bodies of water:

- Lake Mitchell (Queensland), Australia
- Lake Mitchell (Alabama), United States
- Lake Mitchell (Michigan), United States
- Lake Mitchell (South Dakota), United States - see List of lakes of South Dakota

== See also ==
- Mitchell Lake (disambiguation)
