= George Kydd (engineer) =

George Kydd was a prominent Canadian engineer. He was known for playing key roles in large construction projects. From 1916 to 1918 he worked on the Trent-Severn Canal. From 1924 to 1927 he worked on the Welland Canal. In 1927 he was transferred to Canada's Department of Railways and Canals, and was appointed the supervising engineer in charge of building the Port facilities and rail terminal, in Churchill, Manitoba. Kydd supervised a construction force of over 1,500 workers.

When the port was opened for operations, in 1933, Kydd remained supervising engineer, and was appointed the port's first harbourmaster.

Decades later a tugboat operating in Churchill was named in honour of him.
