= Canal Lake Concrete Arch Bridge =

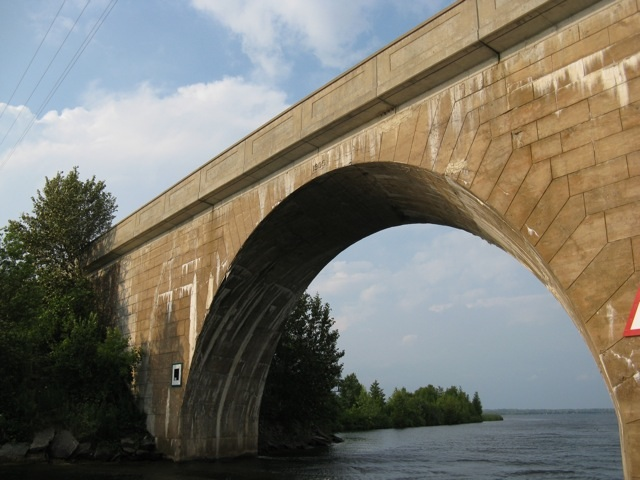
- Coordinates: 44.55801°N 79.04592°W
- Carries: Centennial Park Road
- Crosses: Canal Lake
- Locale: Kawartha Lakes (Ontario)
- Owner: City of Kawartha Lakes
- Heritage status: National Historic Sites of Canada

Characteristics
- Material: Reinforced concrete
- Total length: 202 feet (62 m)
- Width: 16 feet (4.9 m)
- Height: 29 feet (8.8 m)
- Water depth: up to 15 feet (4.6 m)
- No. of spans: 1
- Clearance below: 29 feet (8.8 m)
- No. of lanes: 2

History
- Designer: Department of Railways and Canals
- Construction start: 1905
- Construction end: 1905
- Opened: 1905

National Historic Site of Canada
- Official name: Canal Lake Concrete Arch Bridge National Historic Site of Canada
- Designated: 24 June 1988

Canal Lake Concrete Arch Bridge is an arch bridge in Ontario, Canada, spanning a portion of Canal Lake on the Trent–Severn Waterway between Balsam Lake and Lake Simcoe. It is north-northeast from the town of Bolsover.

The closed spandrel bridge is the earliest-known bridge in Canada to be constructed using reinforced concrete, and is based on a modified Melan System of bridge reinforcement. In 1988, it was designated a National Historic Site of Canada for representing a transitional period in bridge construction and a milestone in civil engineering in Canada.

== Structure ==
Designed by the federal Department of Railways and Canals, the bridge was built in 1905. The original design was for a concrete arch bridge typical of its era. Before construction began, the design was updated by integrating reinforced concrete using a modified Melan System of bridge reinforcement, which had been pioneered by its namesake Josef Melan in the 1890s. Among the changes were the installation of struts underneath the arch, and a reduction in the mass of the arch and its abutments. The concrete mass is reinforced with curved steel girders.

The arch is a closed spandrel, in which the structural load of the deck is carried to the arch ribs via spandrel walls. It has a radius of 30 feet (9.1 m), and its vertical clearance of 29 feet (8.8 m) is sufficient for vessels to navigate underneath. The deck is 16 feet (4.9 m) wide, and spans 202 feet (62 m) over the lake, anchored by reinforced concrete abutments. The concrete spandrel walls are marked to imitate the voussoir layout common to stone arch bridges and the "coursed stonework of stone masonry bridge abutments".

The bridge was refurbished between April 2018 and February 2019 by GMP Contracting Ltd., the work included patching concrete, refacing the surface and replacing the road deck.

== National Historic Site of Canada ==
The bridge was designated a National Historic Site of Canada on 24 June 1988 for its early use of concrete in bridge construction, for being the earliest-known bridge in Canada to be constructed using reinforced concrete, and for its "close association with the Trent-Severn Waterway". It is one of only a few mass concrete bridges built in North America, as the bridge "represents a transitional structure" between earlier stone arch bridges and the advent of reinforced bridges.

On 30 August 2008, a plaque was unveiled by Bruce Stanton, Member of Parliament for Simcoe North, representing the Historic Sites and Monuments Board of Canada. The plaque, installed on the southwest side of the bridge, states that the Canal Lake Concrete Arch Bridge represents "an important milestone in the history of civil engineering in Canada", as it led to the development of large-span reinforced concrete bridges.
