= H. M. Wilson =

H. M. Wilson is a tugboat especially designed for service in Churchill, Manitoba, the only Arctic Ocean port connected to the North America railroad grid.

The vessel was designed by the well-known naval architectural firm, Robert Allan Ltd. She was designed to be broken down into several loads that could each be shipped on a railroad flatcar, to be reassembled in Churchill. She was designed with a relatively flat bottom, due to the lack of any nearby ports with maintenance facilities. When her hull needs to be serviced or inspected, she beaches herself. She is equipped with a water cannon, for fighting fires. She was built to operate in icy waters.

== See also ==
- George Kydd
