= Talbot River (Ontario) =

- Location of the mouth of the Talbot River in southern Ontario

Location
- Country: Canada
- Province: Ontario
- Region: Central Ontario

Physical characteristics
- Source: Talbot Lake
  - location: Kawartha Lakes
  - coordinates: 44°41′17″N 78°51′38″W
  - elevation: 262 m (860 ft)
- Mouth: Lake Simcoe
  - coordinates: 44°28′16″N 79°09′49″W
  - elevation: 219 m (719 ft)

Basin features
- River system: Great Lakes Basin

The Talbot River is a river in the Great Lakes Basin in Central Ontario, Canada which flows from Talbot Lake to Lake Simcoe and forms the border between Ramara township to the north and the Brock township to the south from the river mouth to the edge of their border with the city of Kawartha Lakes at the east.

The lower section of the river is now part of the Trent-Severn Waterway, although a new more direct channel was cut at the end of the 19th century, bypassing the original mouth of the river. The Talbot River drains the natural Raven and Talbot Lakes, as well as the man-made Mitchell and Canal Lakes.

Even before the construction of the waterway, the river provided an important transportation corridor for native peoples and early settlers.

== See also ==
- List of Ontario rivers

== Sources ==
- Map 5 (PDF) (Map). 1 : 700,000. Official road map of Ontario. Ministry of Transportation of Ontario. 2010-01-01.
- Restructured municipalities - Ontario map #6 (Map). Restructuring Maps of Ontario. Ontario Ministry of Municipal Affairs and Housing. 2006. Archived from the original on 2021-02-24.
