= Fort Mitchell =

Fort Mitchell may refer to:

- Fort Mitchell, Alabama
- Fort Mitchell, Florida
- Fort Mitchell, Kentucky
- Fort Mitchell, Nebraska, an Army fort in service from 1864 to 1867, near present-day Scottsbluff, Nebraska
- Fort Mitchell (South Carolina), an American Civil War fortification and historic site
- Fort Mitchell, Virginia, an unincorporated community
- Fort Mitchell Historic Site, archaeological site and park at the site of the Alabama fort of the same name

== See also ==
- Fort Mitchel (disambiguation)
