= Mitchell Butte =

Butte in Navajo County, Arizona, United States

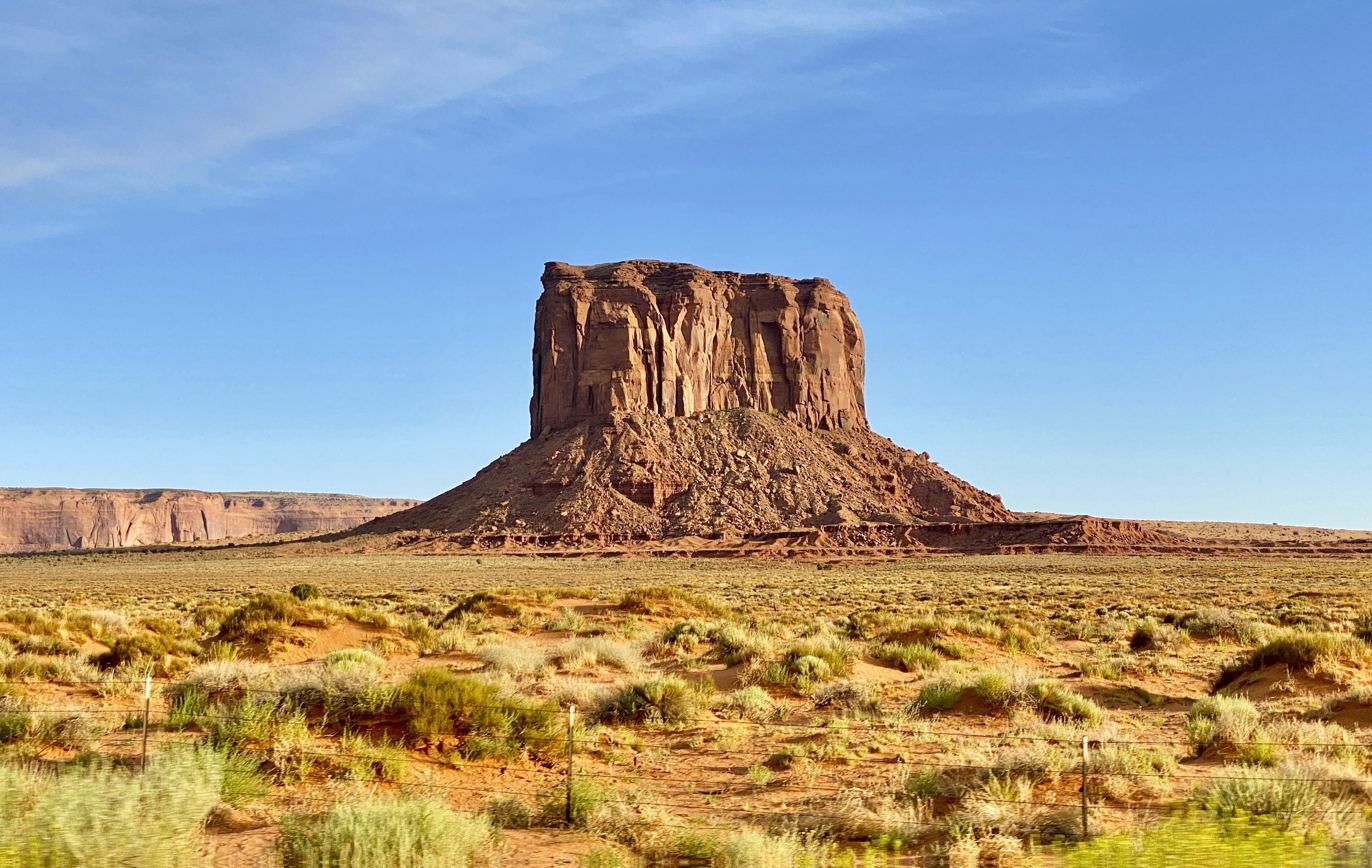
- North aspect

Highest point
- Elevation: 6,383 ft (1,946 m)
- Prominence: 893 ft (272 m)
- Parent peak: Gray Whiskers (6,385 ft)
- Isolation: 1.02 mi (1.64 km)
- Coordinates: 36°58′35″N 110°09′09″W

Geography
- Location within Arizona Location within the United States
- Location: Navajo Reservation; Navajo County, Arizona, U.S.
- Parent range: Colorado Plateau
- Topo map: USGS Mystery Valley

Geology
- Mountain type: Butte
- Rock type: Sandstone

Climbing
- First ascent: June 9, 1985, by Banditos
- Easiest route: class 5.x climbing

Mitchell Butte is a 6,383-foot-elevation (1,946-meter) summit in Navajo County, Arizona, United States.

== Description ==
Mitchell Butte is situated 2.2 miles (3.5 km) west-southwest of the Monument Valley visitor center on Navajo Nation land and can be seen from Highway 163. Precipitation runoff from this butte's slopes drains to Mitchell Butte Wash and Oljeto Wash which are part of the San Juan River drainage basin. Topographic relief is significant as the summit rises 900 feet (274 meters) above the surrounding terrain in 0.2 mile (0.32 km). The nearest higher neighbor is Mitchell Mesa, 1.86 miles (2.99 km) to the east. The landform's toponym has been officially adopted by the U.S. Board on Geographic Names. The Mitchell name refers to Hearndon Mitchell, who along with Robert Merrick were silver prospectors. They were warned in 1879 to stay away from Monument Valley but were shot and killed there the following year by Utes.

== Geology ==
Mitchell Butte is composed of three principal strata. The bottom layer is slope-forming Organ Rock Shale, the next stratum is cliff-forming De Chelly Sandstone, and the upper layer is Moenkopi Formation. The rock ranges in age from Permian at the bottom to Triassic at the top. The buttes and mesas of Monument Valley are the result of the Organ Rock Shale being more easily eroded than the overlaying sandstone.

== Climate ==
Spring and fall are the most favorable seasons to visit Mitchell Butte. According to the Köppen climate classification system, it is located in a semi-arid climate zone with cold winters and hot summers. Summers average 54 days above 90 °F (32 °C) annually, and highs rarely exceed 100 °F (38 °C). Summer nights are comfortably cool, and temperatures drop quickly after sunset. Winters are cold, but daytime highs are usually above freezing. Winter temperatures below 0 °F (−18 °C) are uncommon, though possible. This desert climate receives less than 10 inches (250 millimeters) of annual rainfall, and snowfall is generally light during the winter.

== Gallery ==
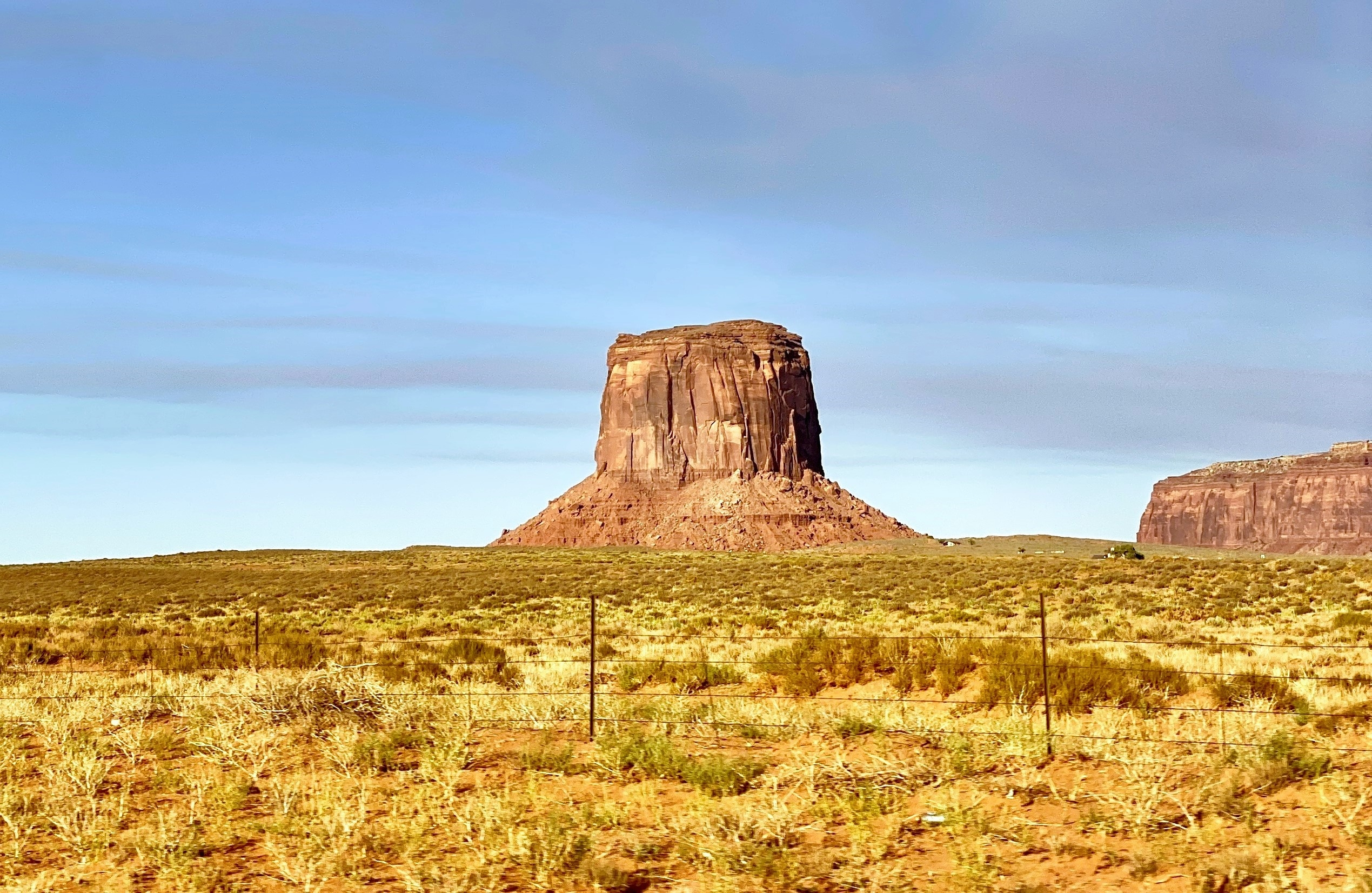
West aspect

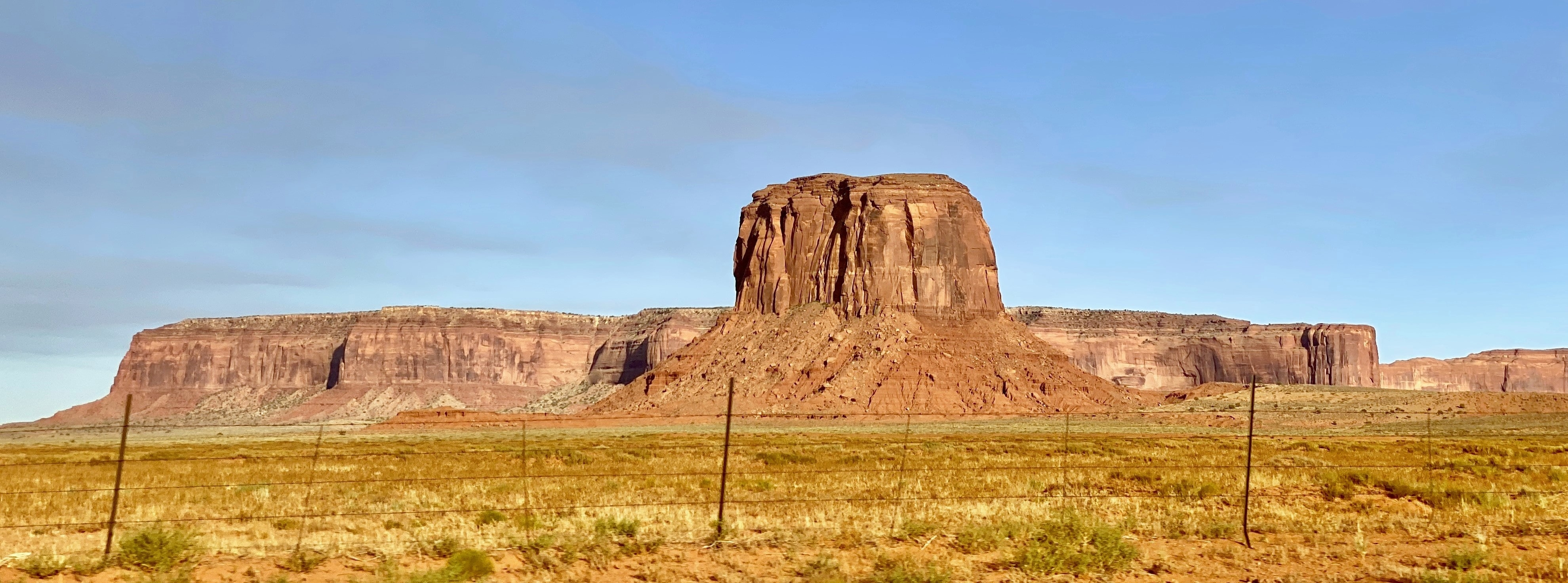
Northwest aspect of Mitchell Butte with Mitchell Mesa in the background.

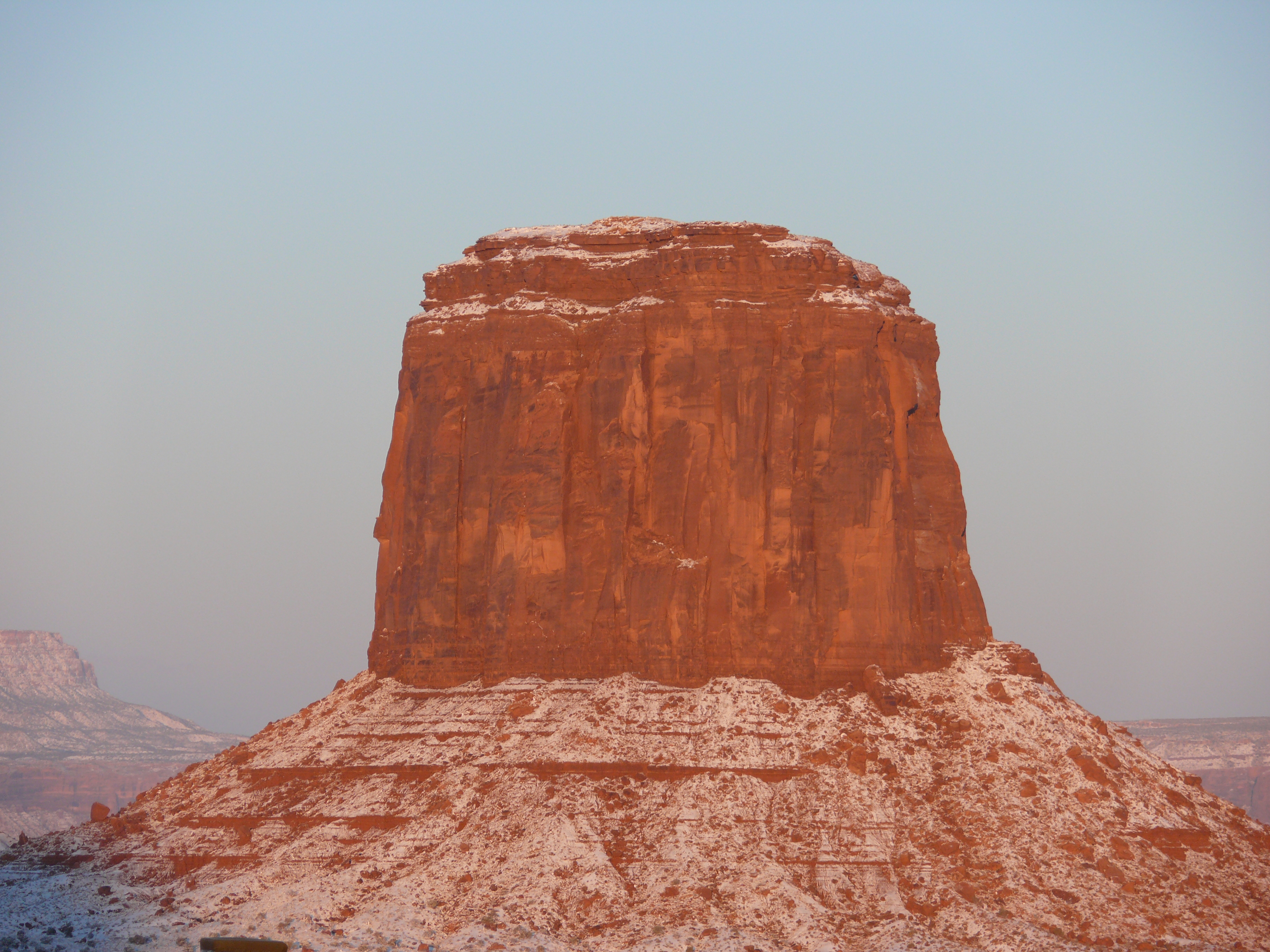
East aspect with a dusting of snow

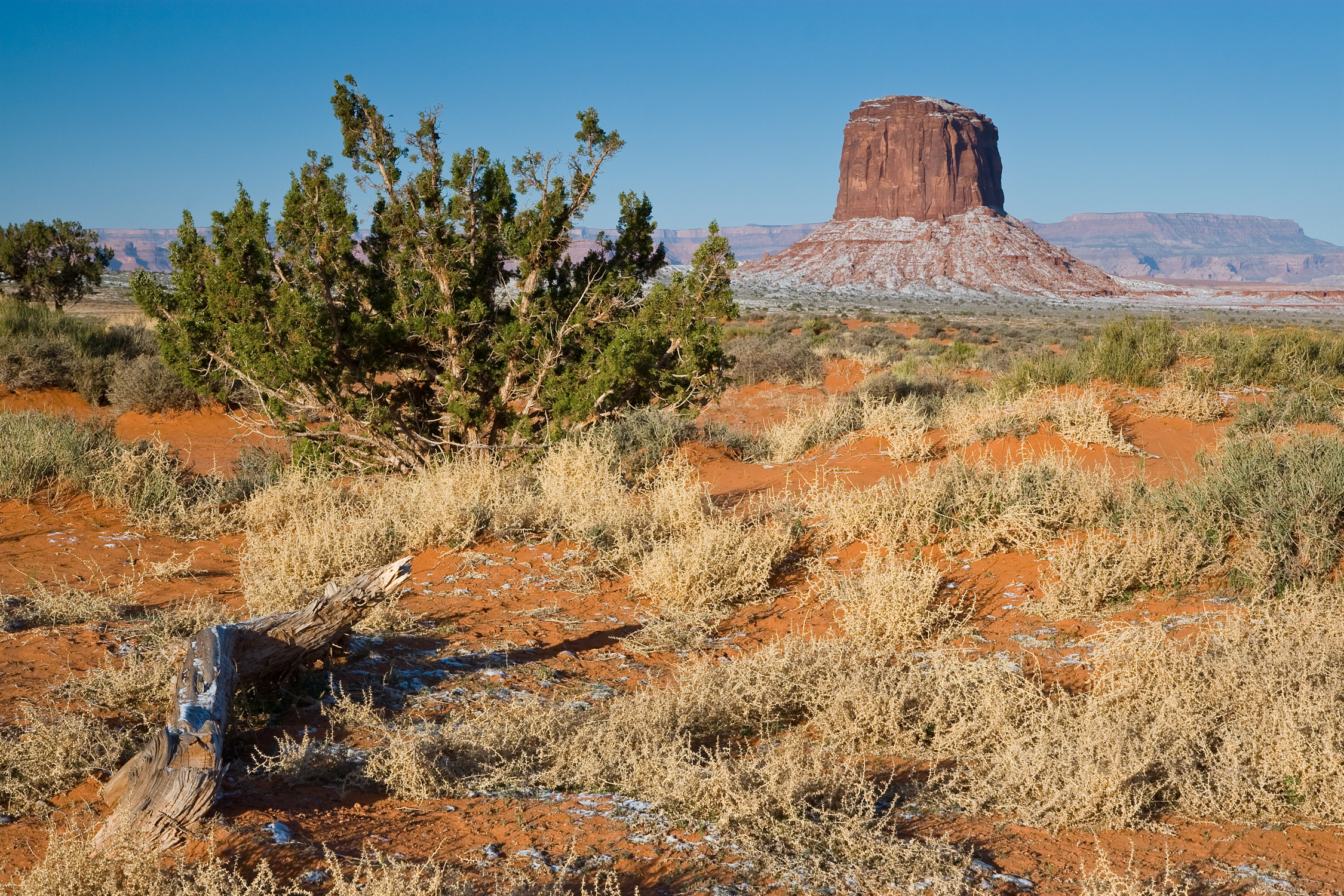
East aspect

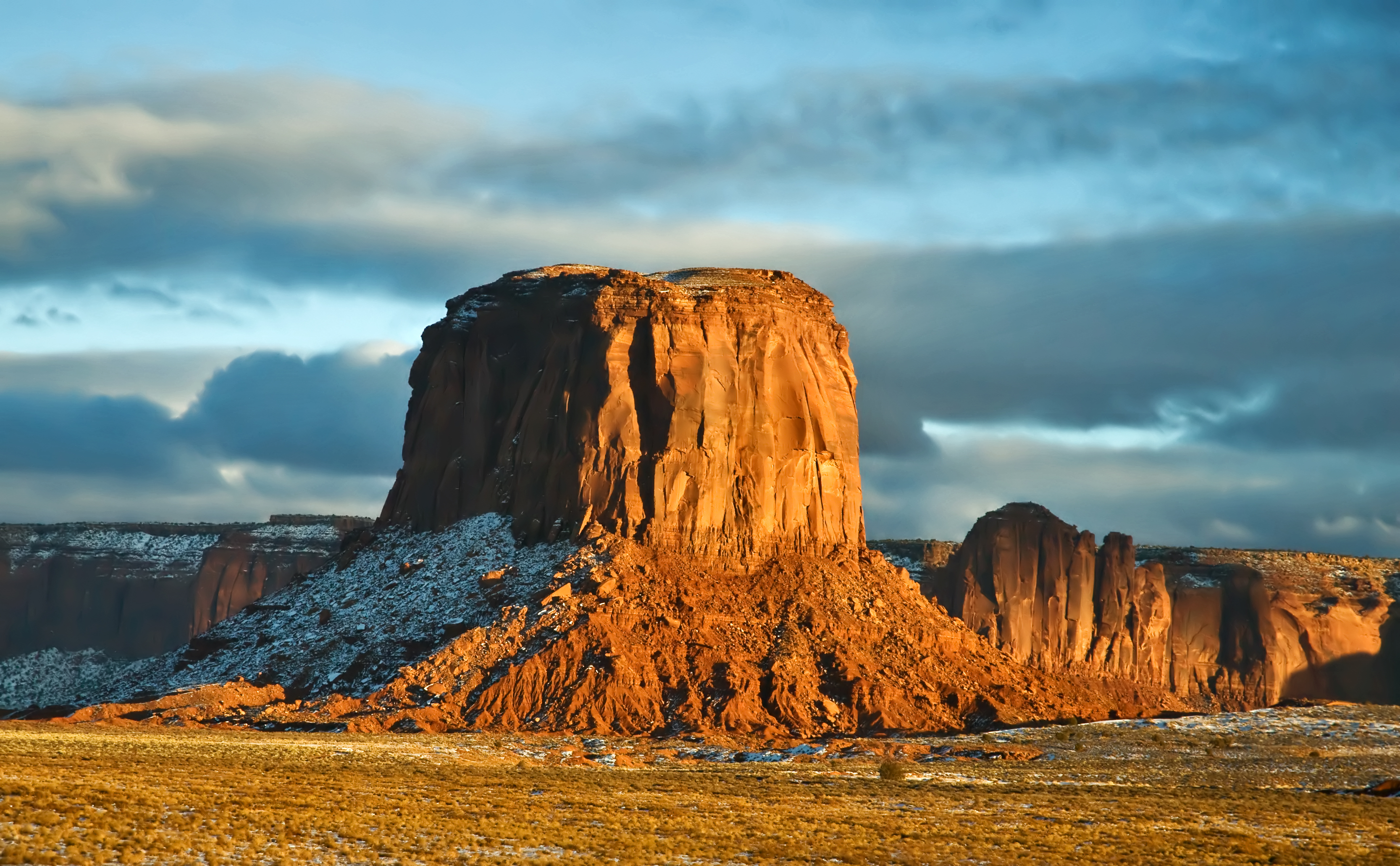
WNW aspect

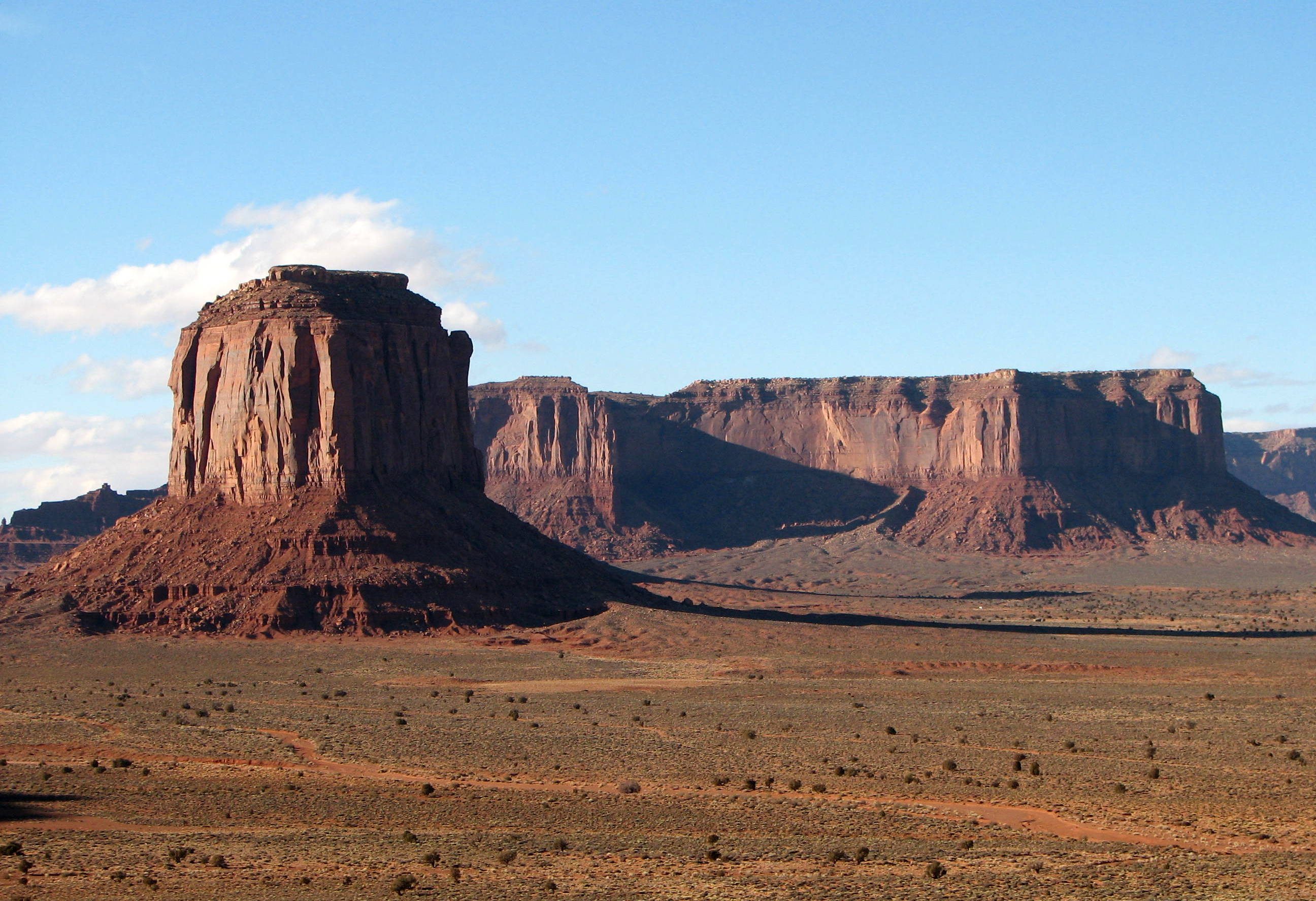
Mitchell Butte (left) with Mitchell Mesa behind

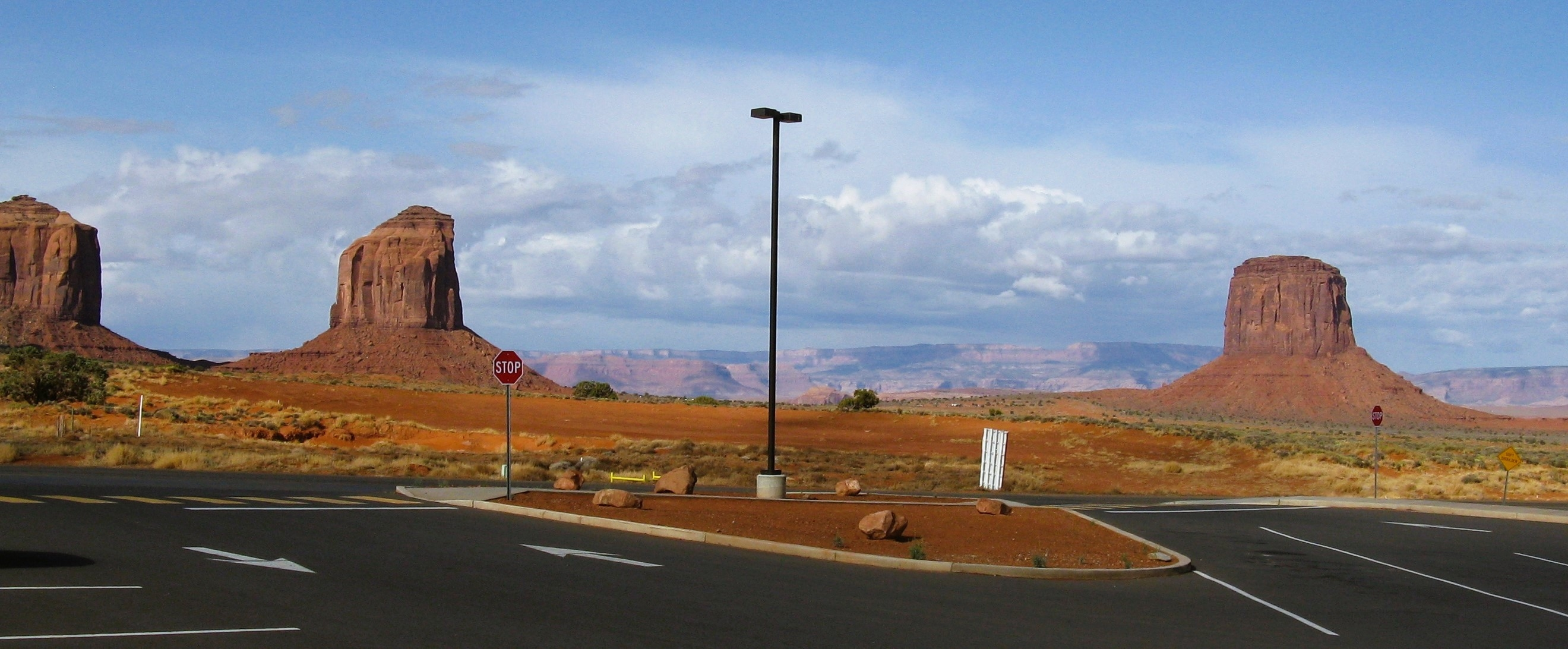
The view from Monument Valley Visitor Center parking lot looking west-southwest at Gray Whiskers (left) and Mitchell Butte (right).

== See also ==
- List of mountains in Arizona
- List of appearances of Monument Valley in the media
