= George Kydd =

Canadian tugboat

The George Kydd is a tugboat operated in Churchill, Manitoba, the only Arctic Ocean port connected to the North America railroad grid.

She was built in Owen Sound, in 1960, as the Ruswell. When requests for a tug designed especially for service Churchill was made, an analysis praised the George Kydd's maneuverability, but described her as underpowered for work with large ocean-going vessels.

The construction manager who oversaw the construction of the port, in 1931, was named George Kydd. When the port facilities were complete Kydd was appointed the Resident Engineer, by the Department of Railroads and Canals. When the vessel was transferred to Churchill, she was renamed in Kydd's honor.

== See also ==
- H. M. Wilson
