= Mitchell River National Park =

Mitchell River National Park is the name of two national parks in Australia:

- Mitchell River National Park (Western Australia) in the Kimberley region of Western Australia
- Mitchell River National Park (Victoria) in Gippsland in Victoria

== See also ==
- Mitchell River (disambiguation)
