= Mitchell Park =

Mitchell Park or Mitchell's Park may refer to:

- Mitchell Park, Victoria, a suburb of Ballarat
- Mitchell Park, South Australia, a suburb south of Adelaide
  - Mitchell Park Football Club
  - Mitchell Park railway station
- Mitchell Park, within the Cattai National Park near Sydney, New South Wales
- Mitchell Park (Oregon)
- Mitchell Park (Washington, D.C.)
- Mitchell Park Horticultural Conservatory, Milwaukee, Wisconsin
- Mitchell Park Zoo, a county park and zoo outside Durban, South Africa
- L. Dale Mitchell Baseball Park, Norman, Oklahoma
