= Mitchell River =

Mitchell River may refer to:

== Australia ==
- Mitchell River (Queensland)
- Mitchell River (Victoria)
- Mitchell River (Western Australia)
- Mann River (New South Wales) is sometimes referred to as Mitchell River.

== Canada ==
- Mitchell River (Cross River)
- Mitchell River (Quesnel River tributary)

== United States ==
- Mitchell River (Massachusetts)
- Mitchell River (North Carolina)

== See also ==
- Mitchell River National Park (disambiguation)
