= Mitchell Park (Oregon) =

Park in West Haven-Sylvan, Oregon, U.S.

- Location within Oregon
- Location: West Haven-Sylvan, Oregon, U.S.
- Coordinates: 45°31′14″N 122°46′28″W
- Area: 5 acres (2.0 ha)

Mitchell Park is a 5-acre (2.0 ha) park in West Haven-Sylvan, Oregon. Features include basketball and tennis courts, baseball and soccer fields, and a playground.
