= Mitchell Electronics =

American manufacturer

Mitchell Electronics, Inc.
- Company type: Manufacturing
- Founded: 1979
- Headquarters: Athens, Ohio
- Products: Servomotor test equipment
- Website: http://www.mitchell-electronics.com/

Mitchell Electronics Incorporated, founded in 1979, is a manufacturer of equipment to test and run servomotors, encoders and resolvers as well as various third-party electronic devices. Corporate headquarters are located in Athens, Ohio, which is also where manufacturing takes place. The company is an associate member of the Electrical Apparatus Service Association (EASA), an international electromechanical trade organization.

== Company history ==
Mitchell Electronics began in 1979 by providing custom designed industrial electronic systems to the motion control. By 1983 the company had progressed to offering standard computer based industrial products to end users and to original equipment manufacturers as components in their products and ten years later began offering encoder test equipment. In 1999 the company began offering a suite of hardware and Windows-based software to designed to test additional types of encoders as well as resolvers and other servo feedback devices.

In 2001 the company introduced a line of equipment designed to provide repair shops and plant maintenance personnel the ability to test run many types of servo motors with one common drive device. A patent was later issued to the company for "an apparatus that allows a non-standard brushless motor to be driven with a standard drive amplifier."

== Equipment and Services ==
Mitchell Electronics' products include the TI-3000 line of servomotor run-rest equipment, TI-4000EX (formerly PulsePro) line of encoder test equipment, TI-5000EX (formerly TI-5000) line of PC based servo feedback test equipment and software and the TI-7000 line of servo feedback field test equipment. Most major motor and feedback manufacturer's devices are supported by Mitchell Electronics equipment, which is widely used in the motor and feedback repair field and other industrial applications, such as CNC machining and robotics, around the world. Notable manufacturing applications include use by Ford, General Mills, and Sturm Ruger.

The company additionally provides consulting, hardware and software development and manufacturing services to various third party distributors and OEM manufacturers, generally also in the electronics field, such as Avtron and certain divisions of Danaher. Mitchell Electronics equipment is also used in servomotor operation and service training courses.
