= Mitchell Township =

Mitchell Township may refer to:

- Mitchell Township, Cross County, Arkansas, in Cross County, Arkansas
- Mitchell Township, Mitchell County, Iowa
- Mitchell Township, Nemaha County, Kansas, in Nemaha County, Kansas
- Mitchell Township, Rice County, Kansas, in Rice County, Kansas
- Mitchell Township, Michigan
- Mitchell Township, Wilkin County, Minnesota
- Mitchell Township, Bertie County, North Carolina, in Bertie County, North Carolina
- Mitchell Township, Davison County, South Dakota
