= Mitchell Lake =

Mitchell Lake can refer to the following bodies of water:

- Mitchell Lake (Ontario), Canada, an artificial lake
- Mitchell Lake (Apica River), Quebec, Canada
- Mitchell Lake, Georgia, United States - see Willeo Creek
- Mitchell Lake (Pennsylvania) - see List of lakes in Pennsylvania
- Mitchell Lake (San Antonio), Texas, United States
- Mitchell Lakes, Bloomingdale Township, Illinois, United States

== See also ==
- Mitchell Lake East and Mitchell Lake West, Wisconsin, United States - see List of lakes of Oneida County, Wisconsin
- Lake Mitchell (disambiguation)
