= Fort Mitchel =

Fort Mitchel may refer to:

- Fort Mitchel, an 18th-century fort on Spike Island, County Cork, Ireland
- Fort Mitchel, a defensive structure built on the location that was known as Mitchelville in South Carolina, USA
- Fort Mitchel, a military site related to the Defense of Cincinnati, Ohio, USA

== See also ==
- Fort Mitchell (disambiguation)
