= Merritt Woods Natural Area =

Park in the Portland, Oregon metropolitan area

- Location within Oregon
- Location: Cedar Mill, Oregon, U.S.
- Coordinates: 45°31′2″N 122°46′57″W
- Area: 2 acres (0.81 ha)

Merritt Woods Natural Area (formerly Merritt Orchard Park) is a 2-acre (0.81 ha) park and natural area in the Portland, Oregon metropolitan area's Cedar Mill suburb, in the United States.
