= Roger Tilbury Memorial Park =

Public park in the U.S. state of Oregon

- Location within Oregon
- Coordinates: 45°31′33″N 122°46′25″W

Roger Tilbury Memorial Park is a public park in the Portland, Oregon metropolitan area.
