= Mitchell High School =

Mitchell High School may refer to:

In Australia:

- Mitchell High School (New South Wales), Blacktown, New South Wales

In the United Kingdom:

- Mitchell High School (Stoke-on-Trent), Bucknall, Stoke-on-Trent

In the United States:

- General William Mitchell High School, Colorado Springs, Colorado
- J. W. Mitchell High School, New Port Richey, Florida
- Mitchell High School (Indiana), Mitchell, Indiana
- Mitchell High School (Nebraska), Mitchell, Nebraska
- Mitchell High School (North Carolina), Bakersville, North Carolina
- Mitchell School, Mitchell, Oregon
- Mitchell High School (South Dakota), Mitchell, South Dakota
- Mitchell High School (Tennessee), Memphis, Tennessee
