= Mitchellville =

Mitchellville is the name of several places:

== Places ==
Australia

- Mitchellville, South Australia, a locality in the District Council of Franklin Harbour

United States

- Mitchellville, Arkansas
- Mitchellsville, Illinois
- Mitchellville, Iowa
- Mitchellville, Maryland
- Mitchellville, Missouri
- Mitchellville, Tennessee

== See also ==
- Mitchelville
