= Mitchell Mesa =

Mesa in Navajo County, Arizona, United States

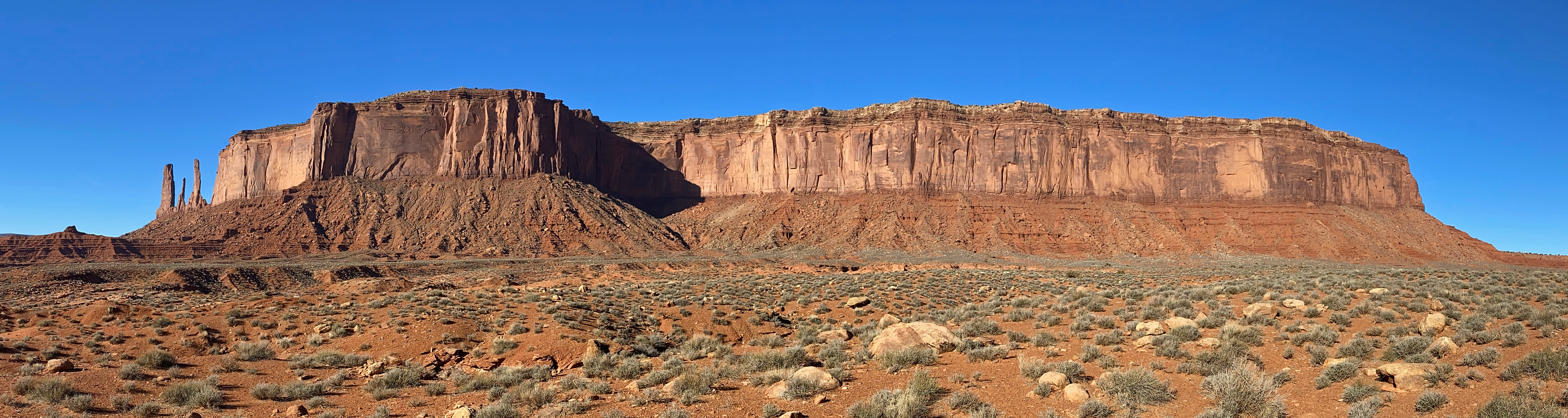
- East aspect

Highest point
- Elevation: 6,586 ft (2,007 m)
- Prominence: 676 ft (206 m)
- Parent peak: Eagle Mesa (6,624 ft)
- Isolation: 5.29 mi (8.51 km)
- Coordinates: 36°58′15″N 110°06′39″W

Geography
- Location within Arizona Location within the United States
- Location: Navajo Reservation; Navajo County, Arizona, U.S.
- Parent range: Colorado Plateau
- Topo map: USGS Mitten Buttes

Geology
- Mountain type: Mesa
- Rock type: Sandstone

Mitchell Mesa is a 6,586-foot-elevation (2,007-meter) summit in Navajo County, Arizona, United States.

== Description ==
Mitchell Mesa is situated 0.75 miles (1.21 km) south of the Monument Valley visitor center on Navajo Nation land and can be seen from Highway 163. The large, irregularly-shaped mesa is southwest of the iconic West and East Mitten Buttes. Precipitation runoff from this mesa's west slope drains to Mitchell Butte Wash, whereas the east slope drains to West Gypsum Creek, which are both part of the San Juan River drainage basin. Topographic relief is significant as the summit rises 1,300 feet (396 meters) above the surrounding terrain in one-half mile (0.8 km). The nearest higher neighbor is Eagle Mesa, 4.97 miles (8.00 km) to the north. The Navajo consider Mitchell Mesa as one of the "door posts" to Monument Valley, with the other being Sentinel Mesa. The landform's toponym has been officially adopted by the U.S. Board on Geographic Names. The Mitchell name refers to Hearndon Mitchell, who along with Robert Merrick were prospectors. They were warned in 1879 to stay away from Monument Valley but were shot and killed there the following year by Utes. There is also Mitchell Butte immediately west of the mesa where Mitchell was killed.

== Geology ==
Mitchell Mesa is a mesa composed of three principal strata. The bottom layer is slope-forming Organ Rock Shale, the next stratum is cliff-forming De Chelly Sandstone, and the upper layer is Moenkopi Formation capped by 50-foot thick Shinarump Conglomerate. The rock ranges in age from Permian at the bottom to Late Triassic at the top. The strata are nearly horizontal because the mesa is positioned above the crest of a small anticline. The buttes and mesas of Monument Valley are the result of the Organ Rock Shale being more easily eroded than the overlaying sandstone.

== Three Sisters ==
The Three Sisters are iconic De Chelly Sandstone spires on the southeast tip of Mitchell Mesa. The South Sister is the highest (6,269-ft-elevation) with a 449-ft rise. The slightly lower North Sister (6,269-ft-elevation) rises 440-ft, and the Middle Sister (6,100-ft-elevation) has a 280-ft rise. The first ascent of the South Sister was made on December 17, 1966, by Layton Kor, Larry Dalke, and Dick Erb. The North Sister was first climbed that same month by Layton Kor and Pete Carmen. The Middle Sister was first climbed on April 20, 1967, by Fred Beckey, Eric Bjornstad, Harvey T. Carter, and Pat Callis.

== Climate ==
Spring and fall are the most favorable seasons to visit Mitchell Mesa. According to the Köppen climate classification system, it is located in a semi-arid climate zone with cold winters and hot summers. Summers average 54 days above 90 °F (32 °C) annually, and highs rarely exceed 100 °F (38 °C). Summer nights are comfortably cool, and temperatures drop quickly after sunset. Winters are cold, but daytime highs are usually above freezing. Winter temperatures below 0 °F (−18 °C) are uncommon, though possible. This desert climate receives less than 10 inches (250 millimeters) of annual rainfall, and snowfall is generally light during the winter.

== Gallery ==
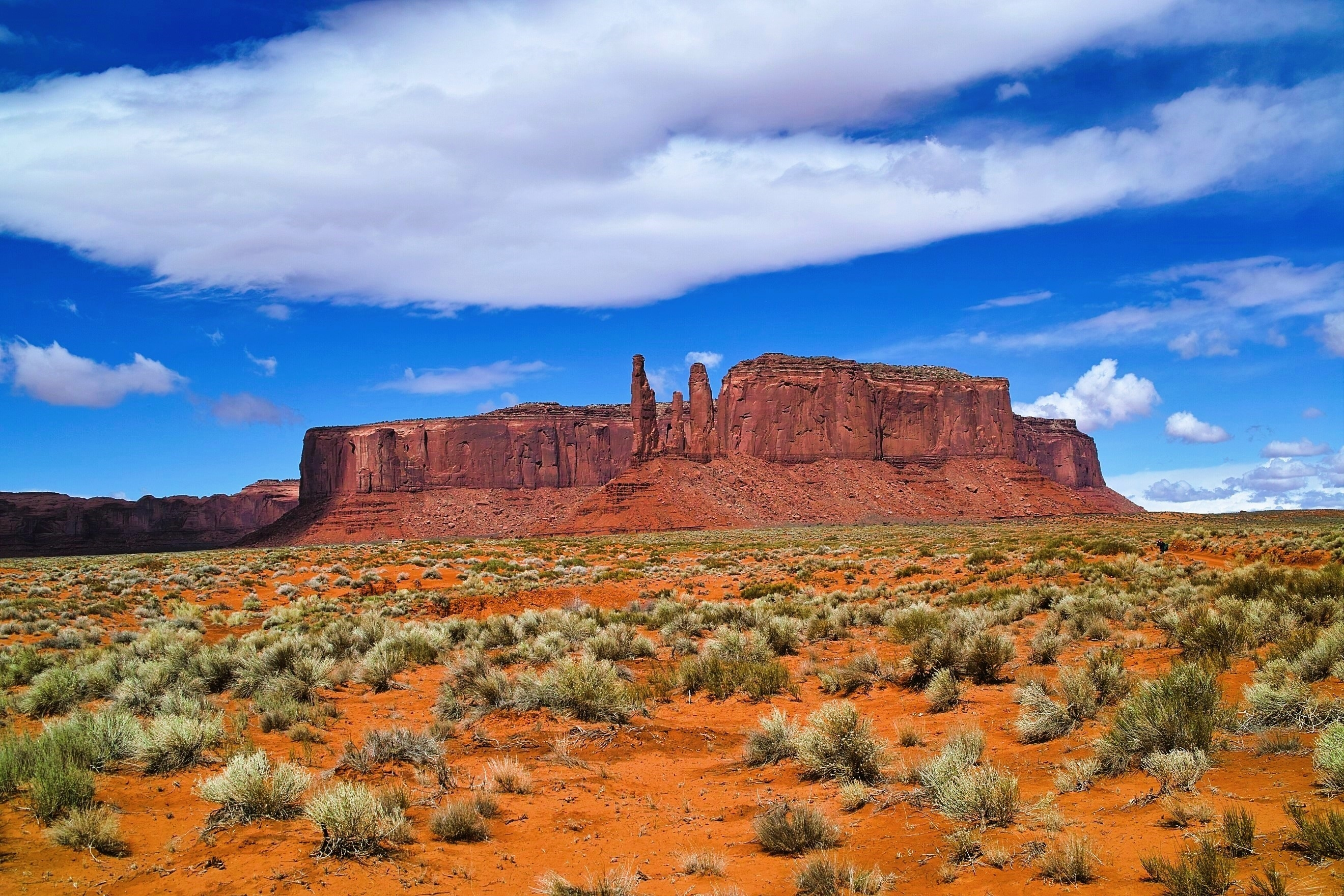
Southeast aspect of Mitchell Mesa with the Three Sisters centered

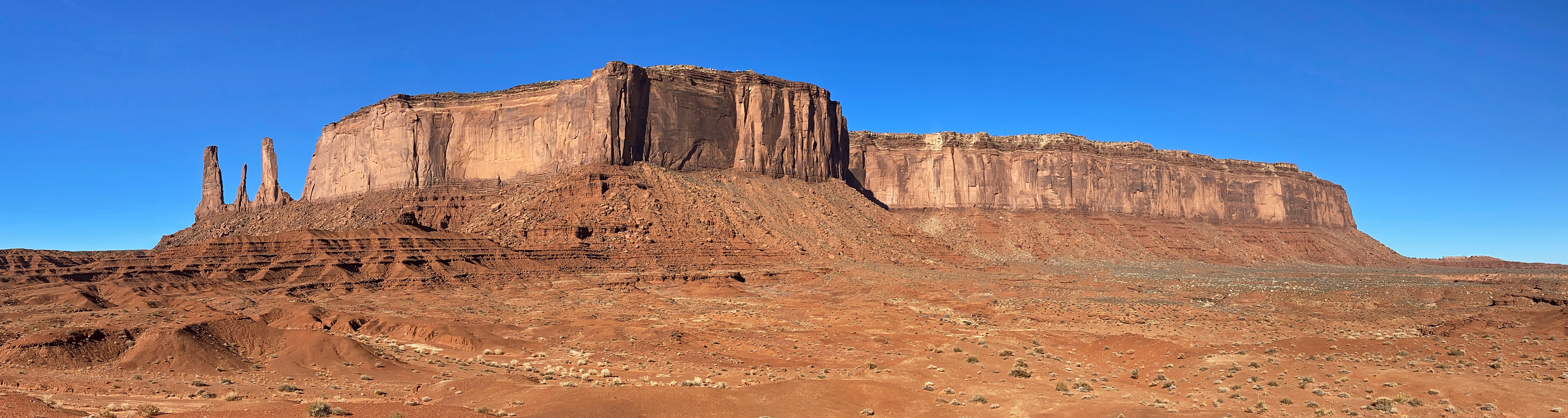
East aspect of Mitchell Mesa with Three Sisters to the left

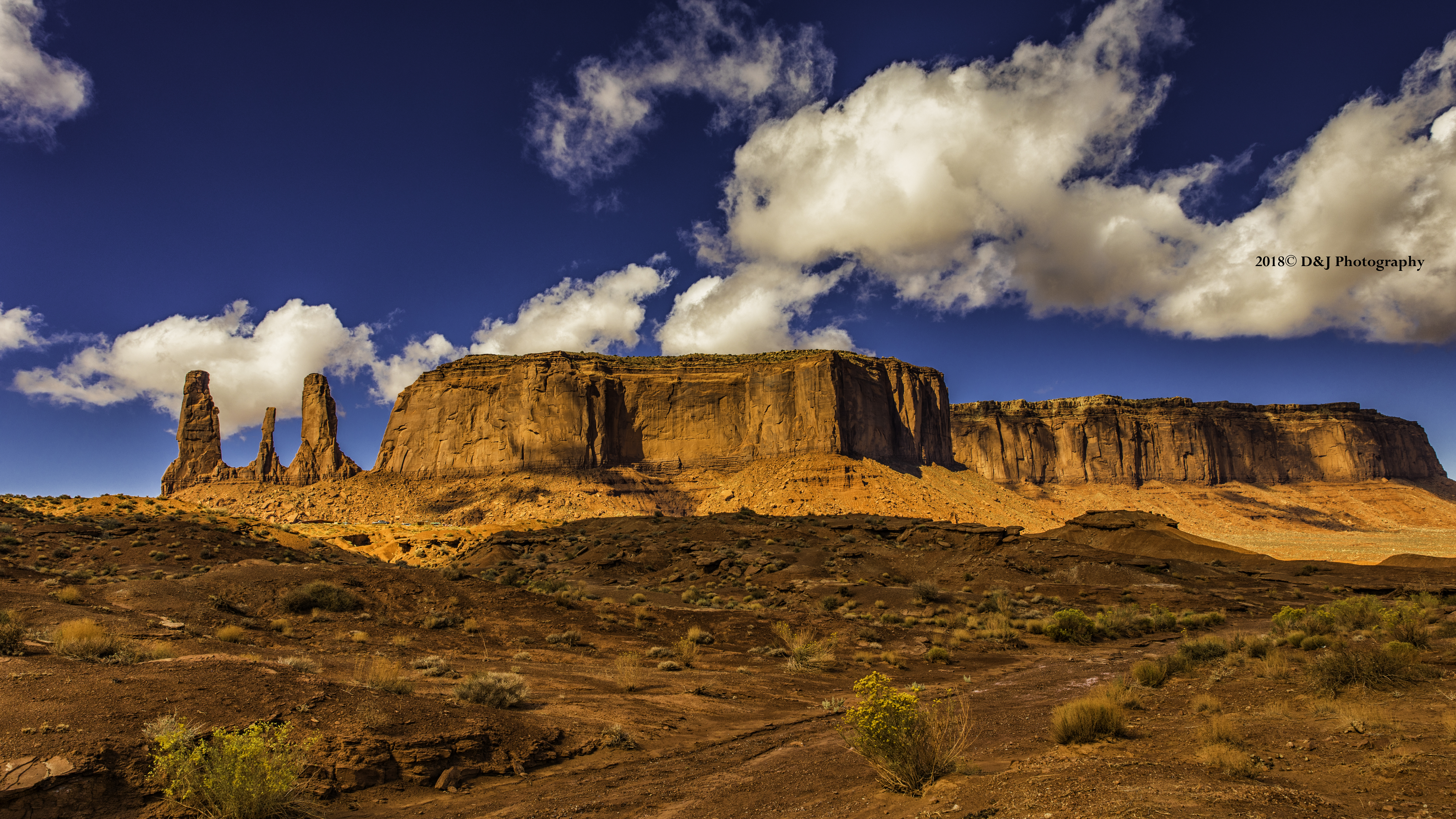
Mitchell Mesa with Three Sisters to left

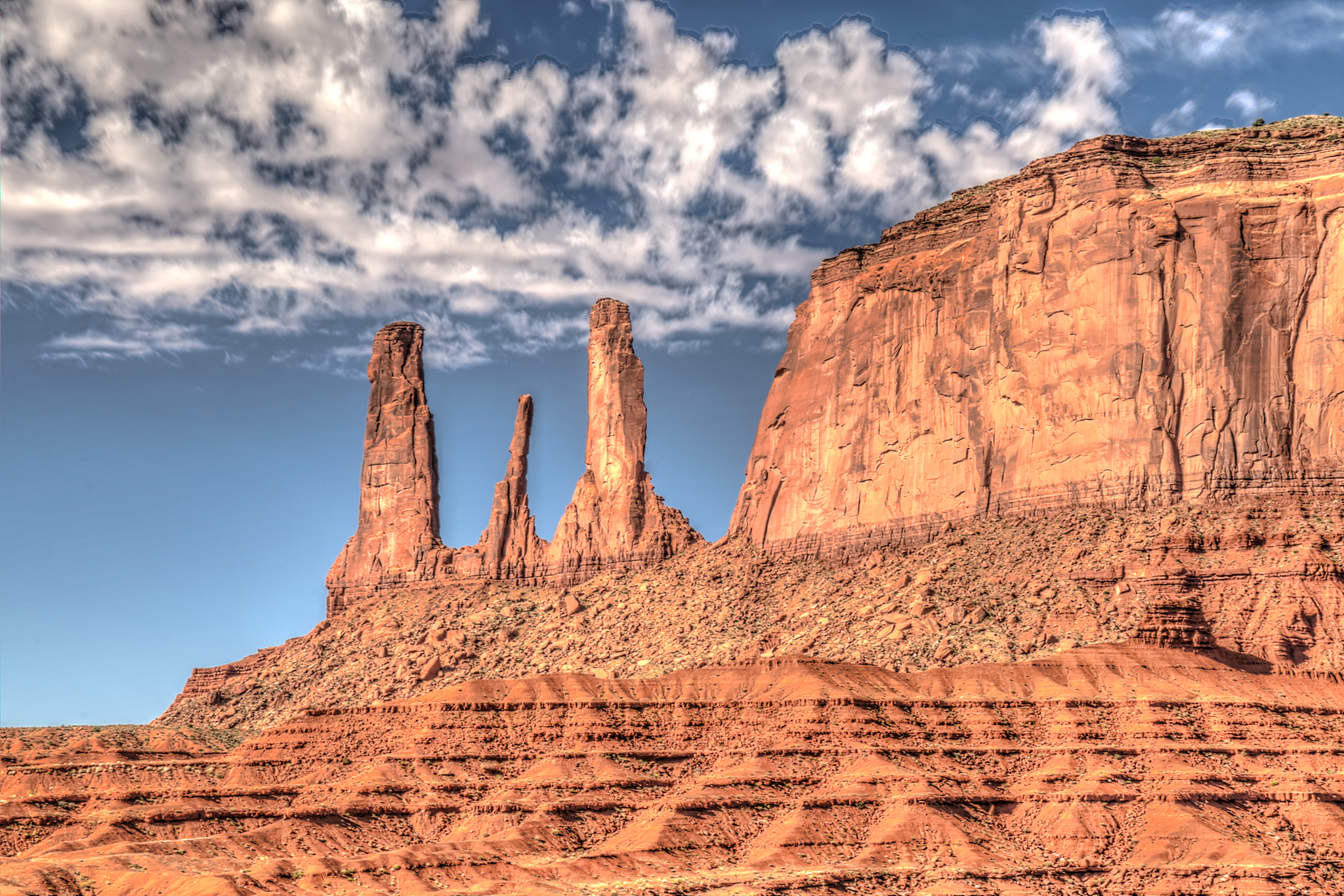
Three Sisters

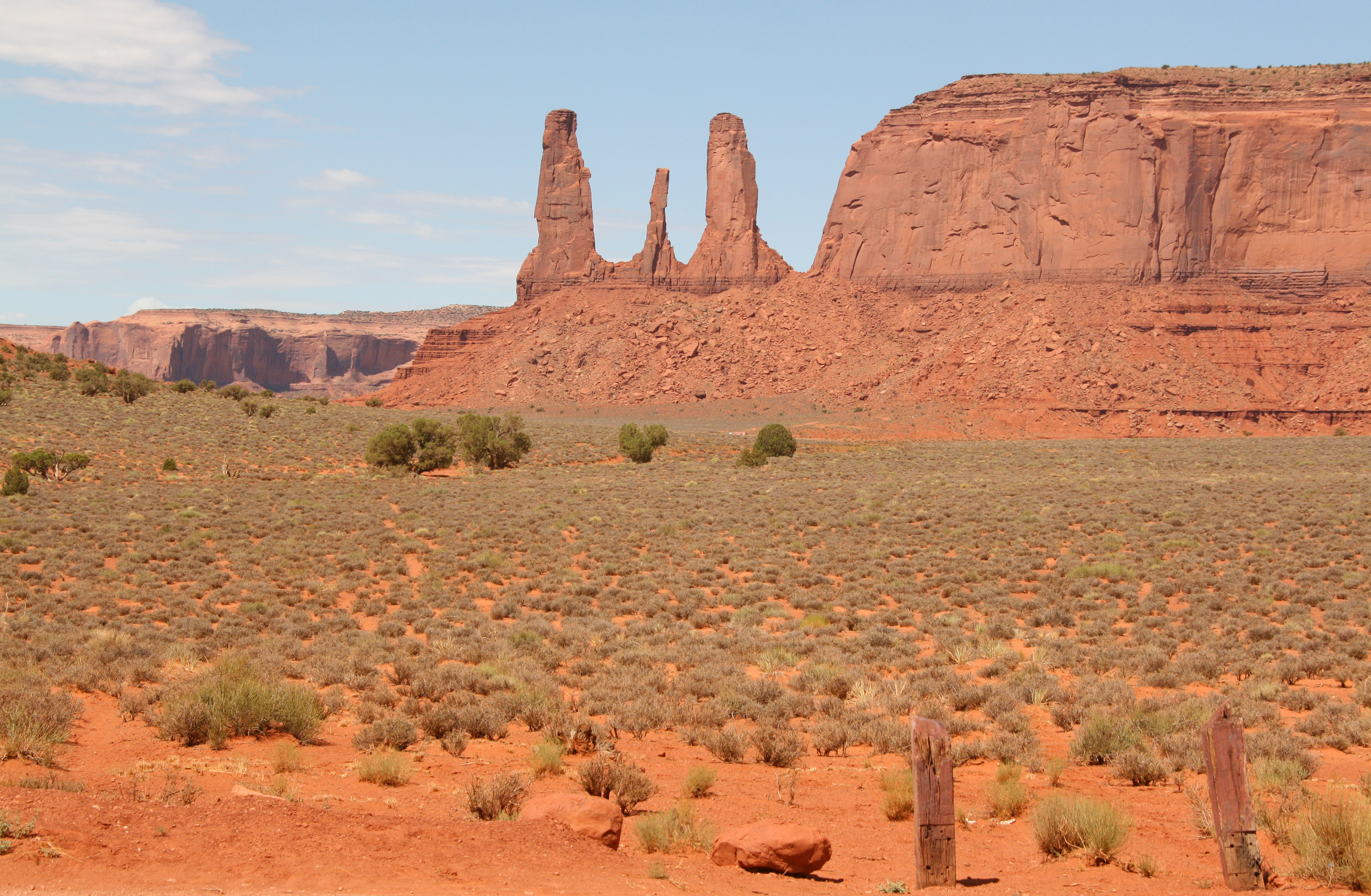
Three Sisters: L→R South, Middle, North

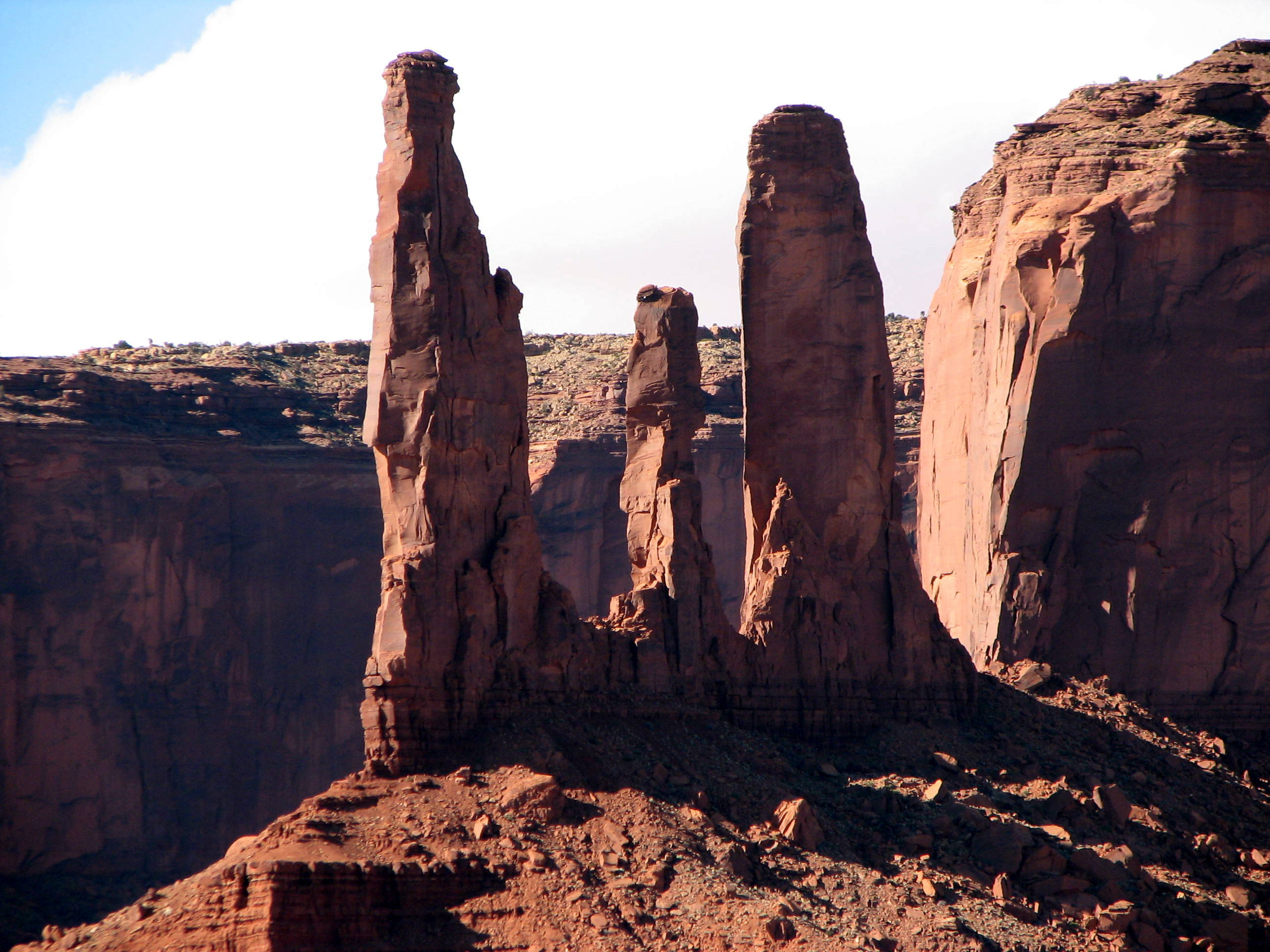
Three Sisters

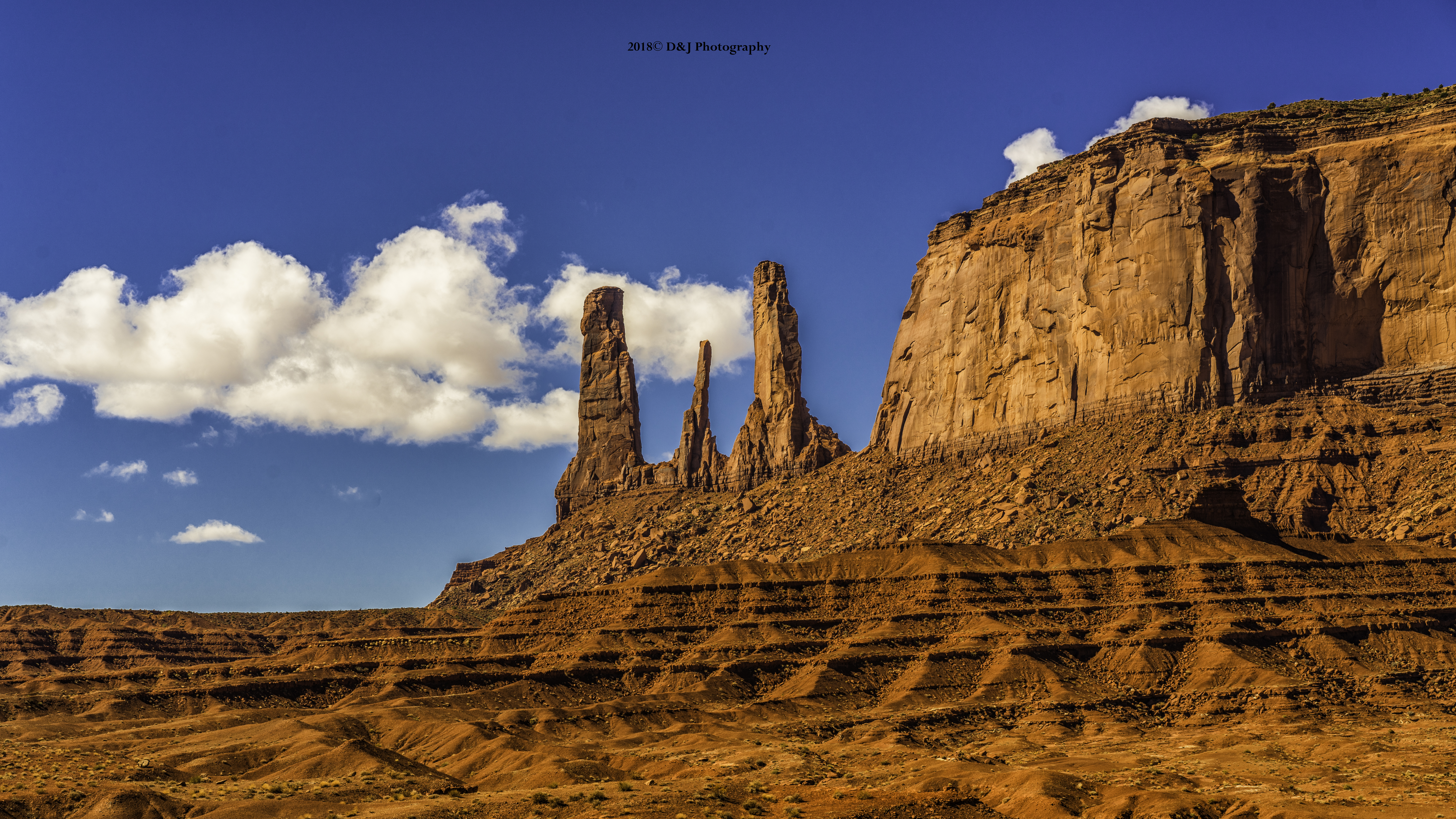
Three Sisters

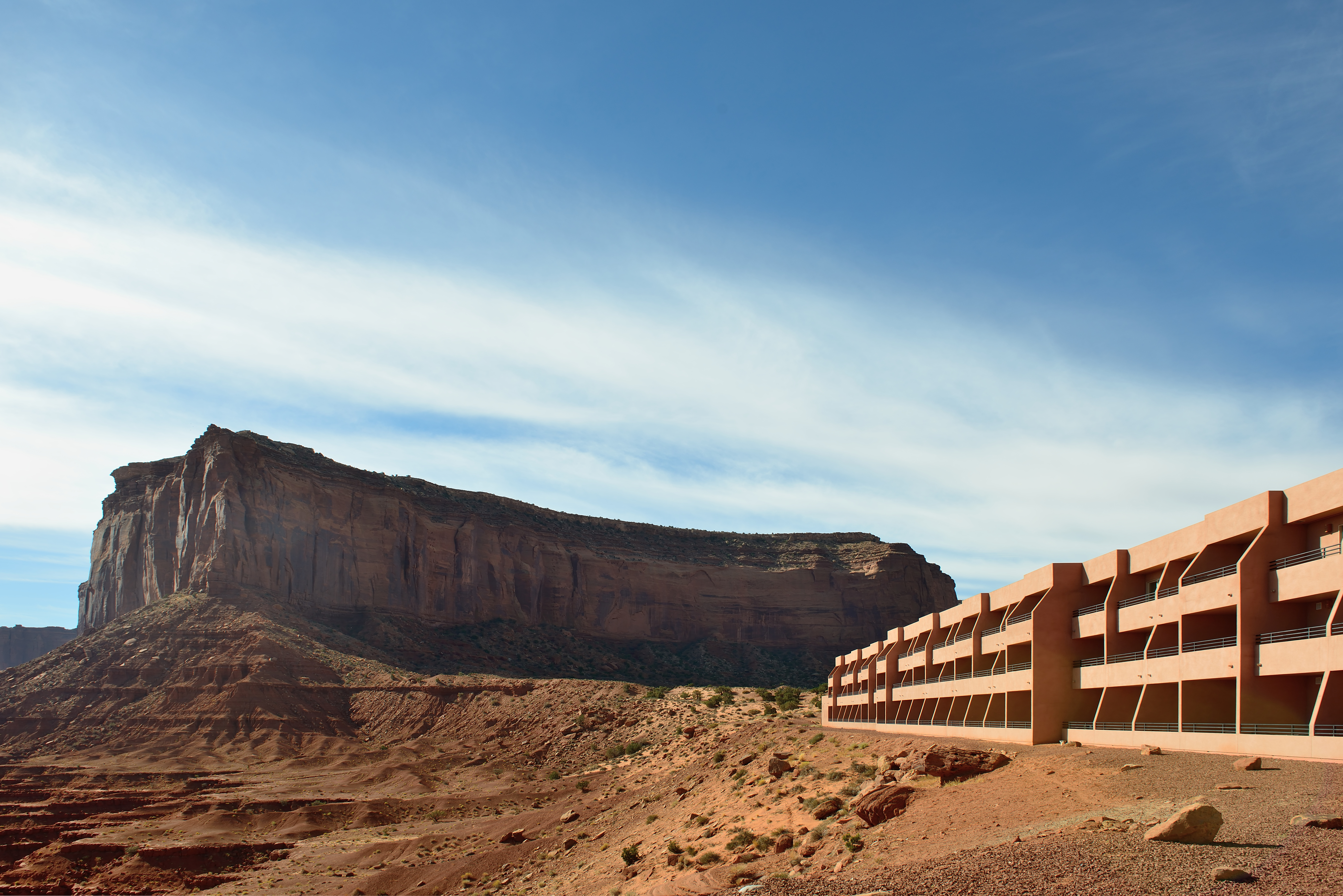
North aspect, with the View Hotel

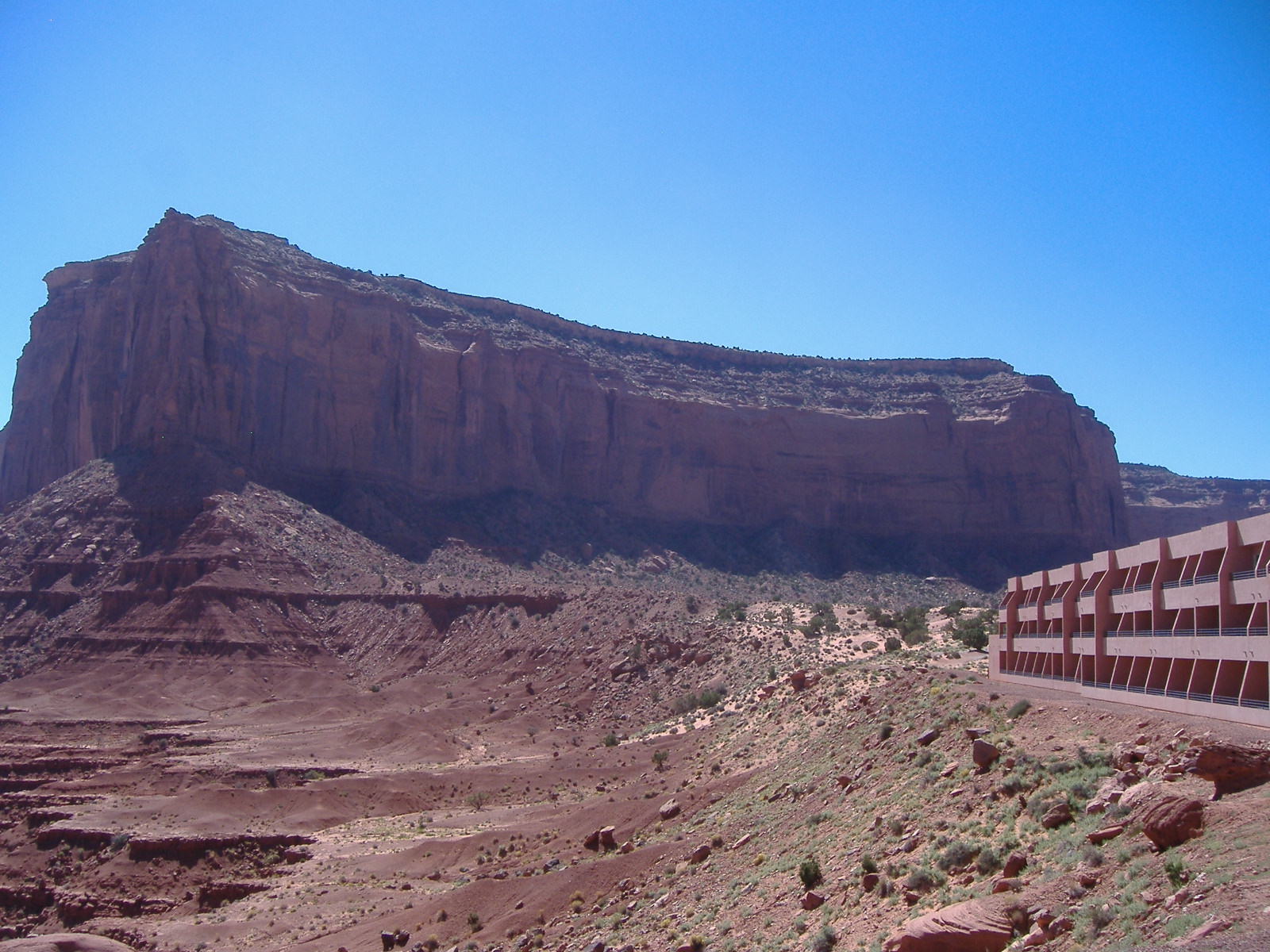
North aspect viewed from Monument Valley Visitors Center area

== See also ==
- List of mountains of Arizona
- List of appearances of Monument Valley in the media
