= Department of Railways and Canals =

Canadian government agency

The Department of Railways and Canals is a former department of the Government of Canada. It had responsibility for the construction, operation, and maintenance of federal government-owned railways, as well as the operational responsibility for canals in Canada.

The department was created in 1879 by transferring several existing government operations, namely the Railway Branch of the Department of Public Works and the operational responsibilities for canals, which were administered by the government's Office of the Chief Engineer.

These components were reorganized into the Railway Branch and the Canal Branch, respectively. The Railway Branch was responsible for administering the federally owned railways, namely the Intercolonial Railway of Canada and the Prince Edward Island Railway (at the time of the department's creation). The branch also provided a program of financial assistance to encourage new railway construction in the country. The Canal Branch administered Canada's canal system and undertook new construction as required.

One of the most powerful departments in the early governments of Canada, it was amalgamated with the Department of Marine and the Civil Aviation Branch of the Department of National Defence in 1936 by the Department of Transportation Act to form the Department of Transport.
