= Mitchell Lake (Ontario) =

Lake in southern Ontario, Canada

- Photo showing the two areas of the lake, separated by the Hartley Road causewayb

- Location in Southern Ontario

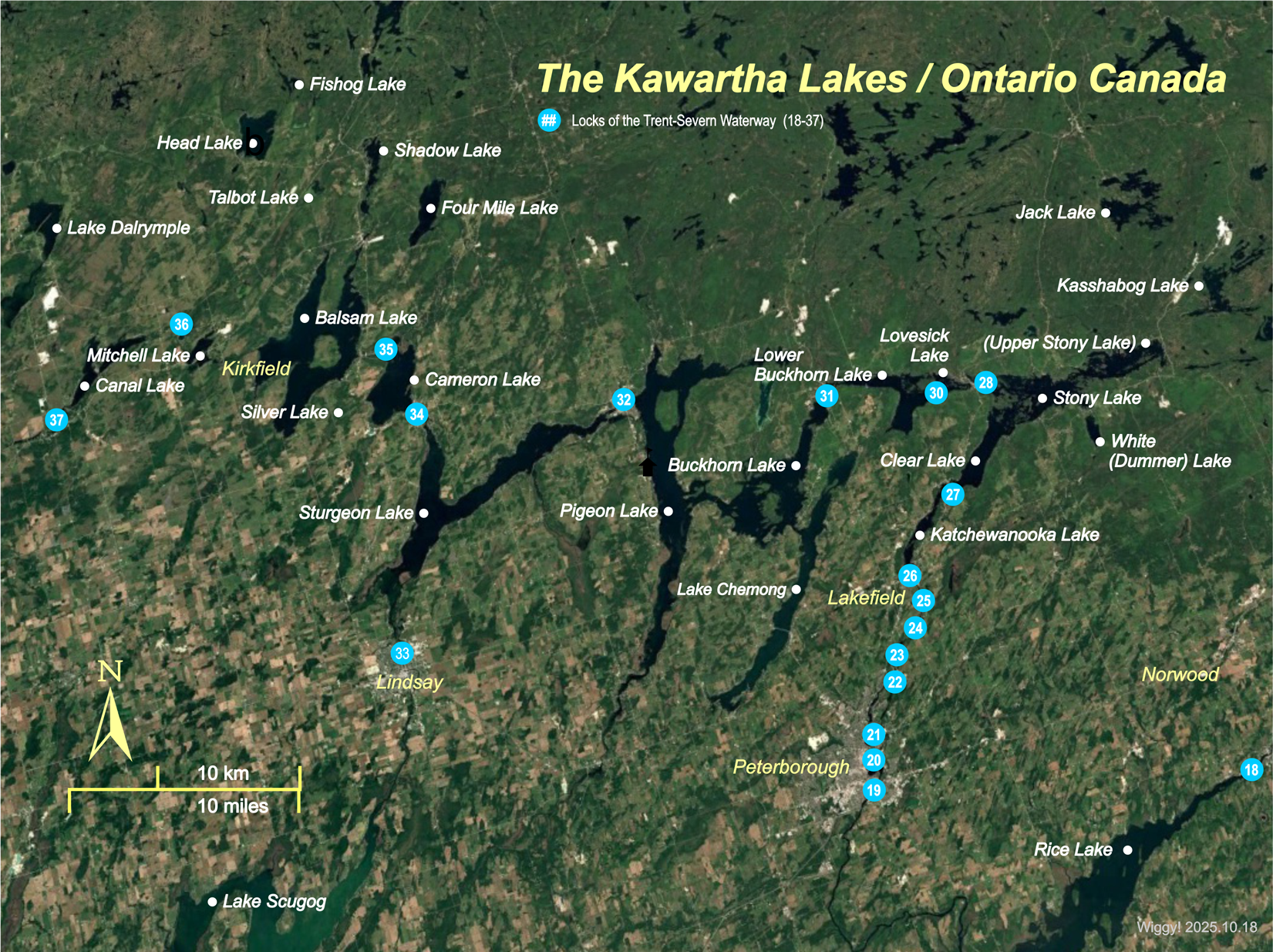
- The Kawartha Lakes and the Trent Severn Waterway; Mitchell Lake in the upper left quadrant
- Location: Kawartha Lakes, Ontario
- Coordinates: 44°34′26″N 78°57′01″W
- Type: Lake
- Part of: Great Lakes Basin
- Primary inflows: Trent–Severn Waterway, Grass Creek
- Primary outflows: Trent–Severn Waterway, Grass Creek
- Basin countries: Canada
- Max. length: 3.3 kilometres (2.1 mi)
- Max. width: 2.2 kilometres (1.4 mi)
- Surface elevation: 256 metres (840 ft)

Mitchell Lake is a small, artificial lake in the Great Lakes Basin and located in the city of Kawartha Lakes in Central Ontario, Canada. The lake was formed sometime in the first decade of the twentieth century alongside the construction of the Kirkfield Lift Lock, which was completed and operational by the end of 1907. It is part of the summit of the Trent–Severn Waterway, the middle of a connection via canals of Balsam Lake on the Gull River system, which flows eventually to Lake Ontario, and the Kirkfield Lift Lock and Canal Lake on the Talbot River system, which flows to Lake Simcoe and eventually to Lake Huron.

== History ==
Prior to flooding, the Grass River (now Grass Creek) flowed through the centre of marshland above which the current lake sits in Eldon Township, Victoria County. It entered from the south-west, reaching Fennel Road (Kawartha Lakes Road 35) where it now crosses the Trent Canal. From here it turned west and followed the same course as the modern canal to Portage Road (formerly Ontario Highway 48, today Kawartha Lakes Road 48). Passing under the road, it resumed a north-easterly course towards the village of Victoria Road, where it flowed as it continues to today, now controlled by a dam, westward into the Talbot River.

== Modern Mitchell Lake ==
Like many of the lakes of the Kawarthas, Mitchell Lake enjoys use by recreational cottagers. However, most of the lake is relatively shallow (Between 3 and 6 feet deep), swampy, and filled with partially or wholly submerged tree stumps remaining from before the flooding. As such, cottages are sparse outside of the canal zone and south eastern section of the lake. The shallow south-western section of the lake is isolated from the rest by Hartley Road, which crosses the lake by causeway, and is only navigable by canoe.

The former path of the Grass River north of Kawartha Lakes 48 is still visible beneath the shallow and undisturbed waters of the lake.

Mitchell Lake suffers from man-made tides. Essentially reaching high tide for the summer months, and low tide throughout the winter. Each year on thanksgiving weekend the Trent-Severn Waterway is closed, Mitchell lake floodplain drops its water elevation 2 ft, and the shoreline recedes up to 20 ft. In late May the Trent-Severn Waterway opens up again and the Mitchell Lake floodplain raises its water elevation 2 ft, and the shoreline expands up to 20 ft. Since this floodplain used to be a forest, decaying underwater biomass raises small islands and releases dissolved methane gas into the water, acidifying the water. The southern portion exposes the ancient tree stumps during low tide. Mitchell Lake floodplain has been completely overrun by invasive Eurasian Milfoil weed (Myriophyllum spicatum). It has decimated the oxygen and natural flora of the water, and begun spreading to other lakes on the Trent-Severn Waterway via boat travel.

== See also ==
- List of lakes in Ontario
