= List of numbered roads in Durham Region =

List of regional roads

The numbered roads in the Regional Municipality of Durham account for about 832 kilometres (517 mi) of the county road system in the Canadian province of Ontario. The Durham Region Works Department owns and maintains the regional roads and regional highways, while the Ministry of Transportation of Ontario (MTO) owns and maintains the King's Highways in the region. The 67 (7 King's Highways, 4 Regional Highways, and 56 Regional Roads) numbered roads (Note: In Ontario, all roads are legally known as highways. However, Road is the more prevalent term for common use. The Regional Municipality of Durham Act (1990), though now superseded by the Ontario Municipal Act (2001), defines both synonymously. The Ontario Municipal Act defines a highway as any road, street or bridge that is not a Provincial Highway.) provide access to the entirety of the region. Highway 401 forms the backbone of the region, traveling from the western boundary of the region to the eastern boundary alongside Lake Ontario, and serving over 200,000 vehicles per day. Several provincially maintained highways existed in the region prior to 1998, when they were transferred to municipal government in the region as part of a province-wide downloading of highways. Where the regional tier of municipal government has since been responsible for these routes, they have been designated as Durham Regional Highways.

== Network ==
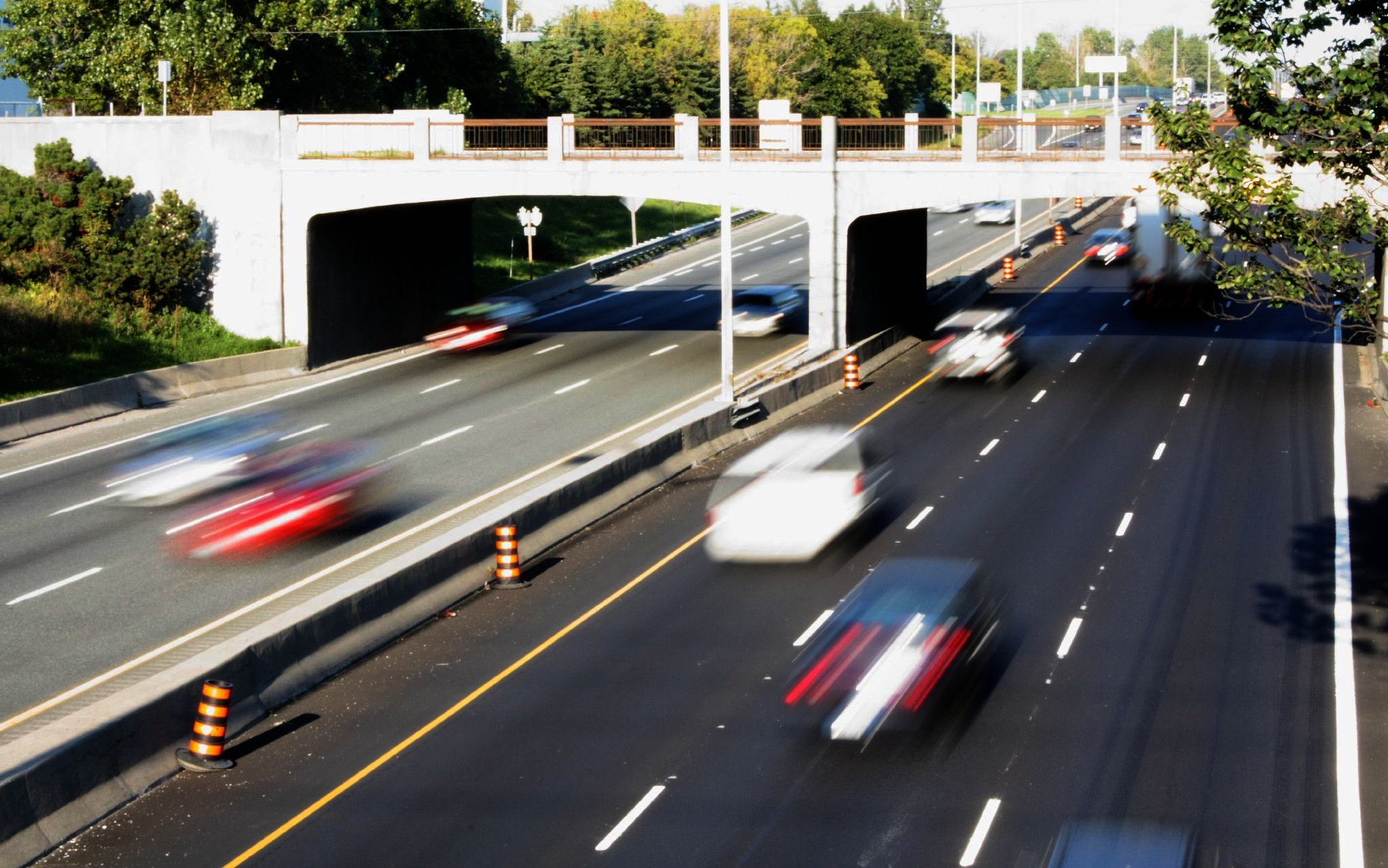
Highway 401 passing through Oshawa, at an abandoned railway overpass east of Albert Street. This bridge, closed in 2001, was demolished in 2011.

The road network of the Regional Municipality of Durham consists of 832 kilometres (2,087 lane kilometres) of arterial roadway. There are 60 numbered roads, referred to mostly as Regional Roads, though four former King's Highways are referred to as Regional Highways, where they are now owned and maintained by the region.

In addition to the roads, there are 209 bridge and culvert structures currently maintained by the region. The region is not responsible for the bridges over and under Highway 401, Highway 407 and Highway 412 nor the bridges over and under Highway 35/115 or, all of which are maintained by the MTO. The region is also exempt from the construction and maintenance of bridges crossed by railway, but not from bridges which separate road and rail crossings.

== History ==
The regional municipality of Durham was created in 1974 by the merger of portions of Durham and Ontario counties.

== Structures ==
The Regional Municipality of Durham is responsible for the maintenance of both pavement as well as many structures that are over, under, or near the pavement. Bridges, culverts, and traffic signals are all built and maintained by the Works Department.

== Services ==
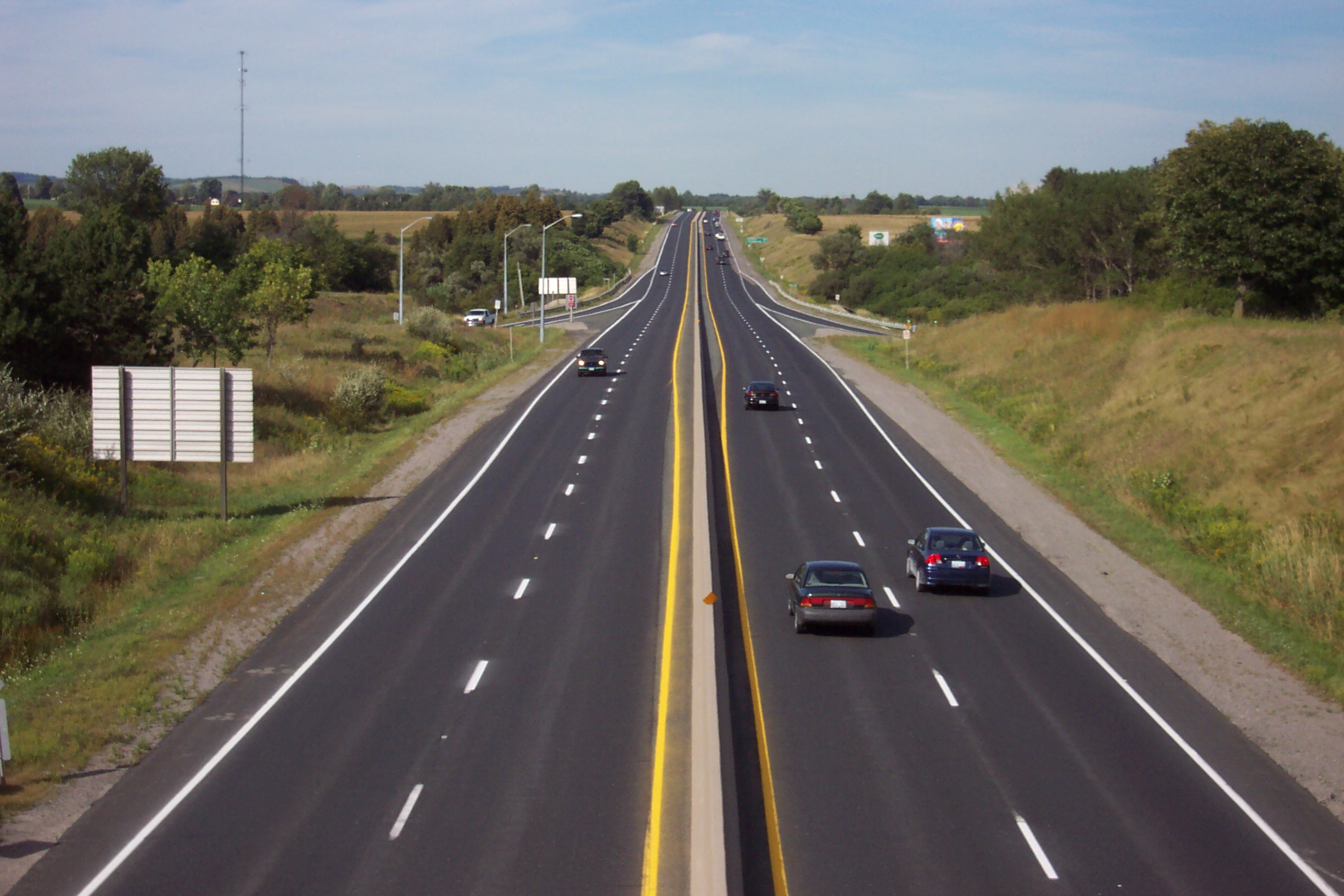
Highway 35 / 115 from the overpass with Durham Regional Highway 2

The Durham Regional Police Service Traffic Enforcement unit handles enforcement of traffic laws, except on the King's Highways, which are patrolled by the Ontario Provincial Police. Speed limits on regional roads vary between 50 and 80 kilometres per hour. Police in Durham will generally not set speed traps, as the region encourages the safe flow of traffic, and punishes unsafe driving rather than speed limits. Maintenance and snow clearing is performed by the Durham Works Department. Five depots operate throughout the region in addition to the traffic operations centre in Whitby.

== Numbered roads ==
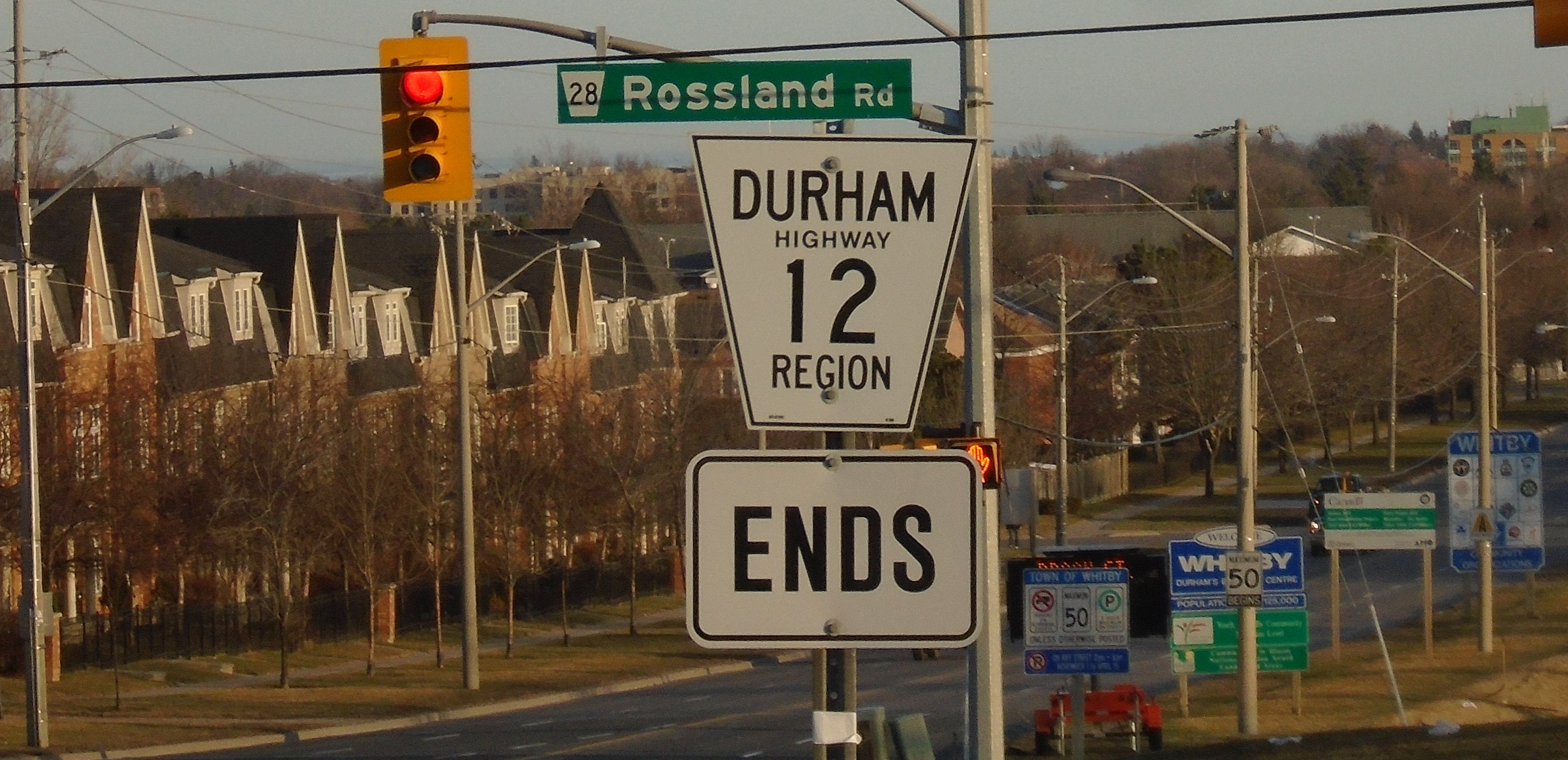
Shield for Regional Highway 12

=== Regional Highways ===
Durham Regional Highways
Route	Name(s)	Western/Southern Terminus	Eastern/Northern Terminus	Length	Communities	Comments
Durham Regional Highway 2	Kingston Road Dundas Street West, King Avenue	Toronto–Durham boundary	Durham–Northumberland boundary	43 km (27 mi)	Pickering, Ajax, Whitby, Bowmanville, Newcastle	Formerly part of Highway 2, prior to January 1, 1998. Split into four sections; ends 800 meters east of Fothergill Court in Whitby, resumes at Regional Road 55 (Townline Road), and has two discontinuities in Clarington.
Durham Regional Highway 12	Brock Street North, Baldwin Street	Regional Road 28 Rossland Road	Gatineau hydro corridor, south of Highway 7 (Highway 407 interchange)	4.8 km (3.0 mi)	Whitby, Brooklin	Formerly part of Highway 12, prior to January 1, 1998; continues north as Highway 12, south as Brock Street
Durham Regional Highway 47	Toronto Street South, Brock Street	Regional Road 30 (York–Durham Line)	Highway 7 / Highway 12	25.1 km (15.6 mi)	Goodwood, Uxbridge	Formerly part of King's Highway 47, prior to April 1, 1997. Continues west as Regional Road 40. Discontinuous between First Avenue/Marietta Street and Fourth Avenue in Uxbridge.
Durham Regional Highway 48	-	Highway 12	Durham–Kawartha Lakes boundary	6.6 km (4.1 mi)	Talbot	Formerly part of King's Highway 48. Continues east as Kawartha Lakes Road 48.

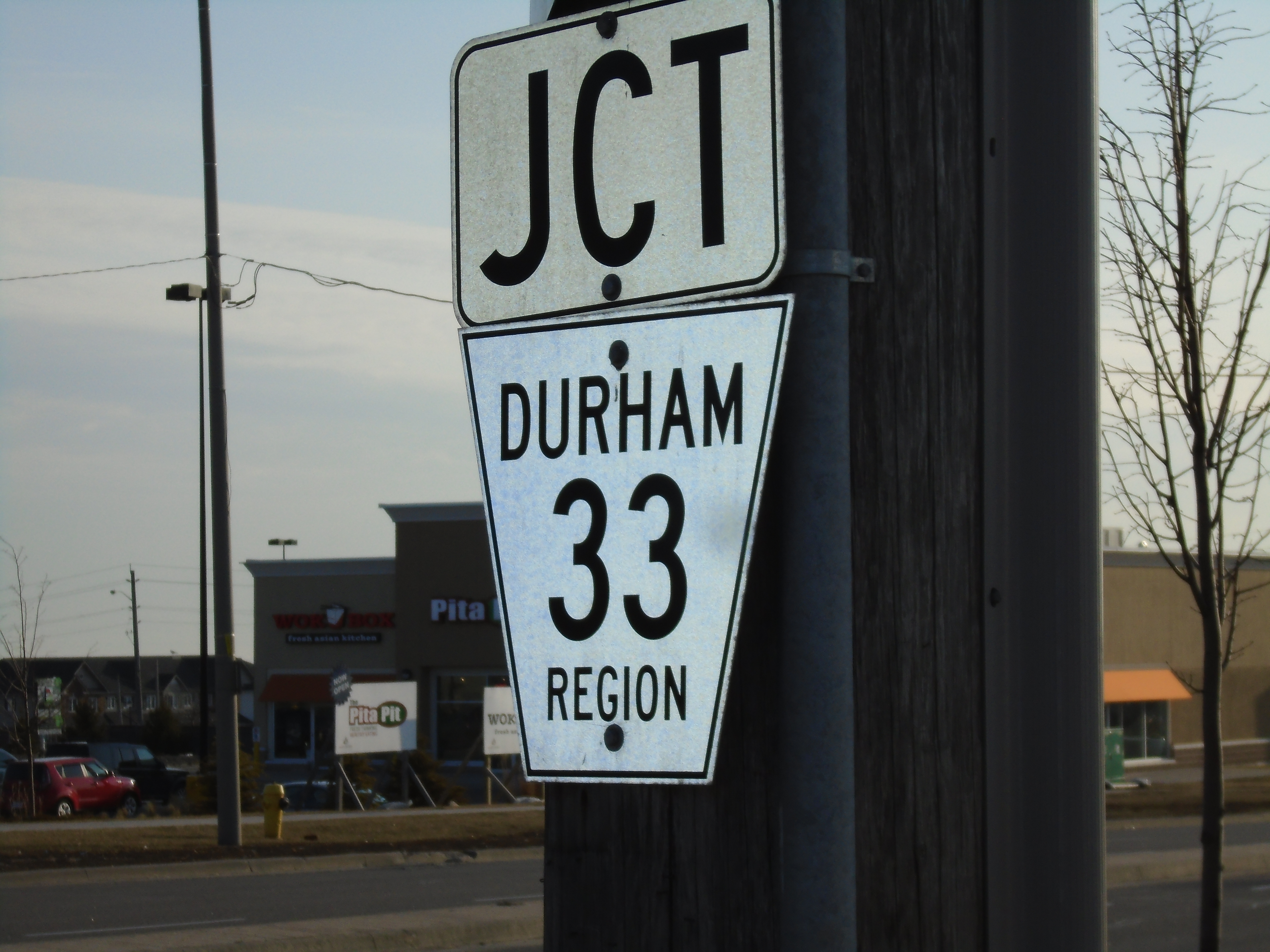
Shield for Regional Road 33

=== Regional Roads ===
Durham Regional Roads
Route	Name(s)	Western/Southern Terminus	Eastern/Northern Terminus	Length	Communities	Comments
Durham Regional Road 1	Brock Road, Main Street	Montgomery Park Road	Regional Road 32 (Ravenshoe Road)	46.2 km (28.7 mi)	Pickering, Uxbridge, Leaskdale, Udora	
Durham Regional Road 2	Simcoe Street, Durham–Victoria Boundary Road	Harbour Road (former Durham Regional Road 62)	Brock Concession Road 14	49 km (30 mi)	Oshawa, Columbus, Raglan, Port Perry, Seagrave, Sonya, Manilla	Signed as Kawartha Lakes Road 2 between Seagrave and Manilla, where the road is maintained by the City of Kawartha Lakes under a boundary road agreement. Used originally by the Mississaugas to get to Osler Marsh. Later became the main highway to Port Perry, and was later extended to Beaverton. In the 1840s, Abram Farewell proposed maintaining the road with tolls, which were ultimately never imposed.
Durham Regional Road 2A	Brock Street West, Centre Street, Fairbanks Street	Regional Road 2 (Simcoe Street)	Regional Road 2 (Simcoe Street)	1.8 km (1.1 mi)	Oshawa	
Durham Regional Road 3	Winchester Road, Grandview Street North, Columbus Road, Darlington Concession 8	Highway 7 / Highway 12 (Baldwin Street)	Regional Road 57 (Bowmanville Avenue)	19.8 km (12.3 mi)	Brooklin, Oshawa, Enniskillen	
Durham Regional Road 4	Taunton Road	Regional Road 30 (York–Durham Line)	Highway 35 / Highway 115	48.1 km (29.9 mi)	Pickering, Ajax, Whitby, Oshawa, Clarington	Continues west as Steeles Avenue into Toronto
Durham Regional Road 5	Central Street, Pickering Concession 9, Myrtle Road, Raglan Road	Regional Road 30 (York–Durham Line)	Regional Road 2 (Simcoe Street)	24.4 km (15.2 mi)	Pickering, Claremont, Whitby, Oshawa	
Durham Regional Road 6	Saintfield Road	Highway 7 / Highway 12	Regional Road 2 (Simcoe Street)	7.0 km (4.3 mi)	Seagrave	
Durham Regional Road 7	Island Road	Highway 7A (Scugog Street)	Hood Road / Carnegie Beach Drive	11.5 km (7.1 mi)		Passes through the Mississaugas of Scugog Island First Nation reserve, and by the Great Blue Heron Casino.
Durham Regional Road 8	Brock Street West, Main Street South, Reach Street	Regional Road 30 (York–Durham Line)	Regional Road 2 (Simcoe Street)	26.1 km (16.2 mi)	Uxbridge, Epsom, Port Perry, Ontario	
Durham Regional Road 9	Ganaraska Road	Highway 35 / Highway 115	Durham–Northumberberland boundary	9.9 km (6.2 mi)	Kendal	
Durham Regional Road 10	River Street	Regional Road 23 (Lakeridge Road)	Highway 7 / Highway 12	5.7 km (3.5 mi)	Sunderland	
Durham Regional Road 11	Sandford Road	Regional Road 30 (York–Durham Line)	Regional Road 1	12.1 km (7.5 mi)	Sandford	Continues west into York Region as Herald Road and Green Lane
Durham Regional Road 12	Cameron Street	Regional Road 23 (Lakeridge Road)	Regional Road 2 (Simcoe Street)	7.1 km (4.4 mi)	Cannington	
Durham Regional Road 13	Zephyr Road, Brock Concession 3	Regional Road 39	Road 2 (Simcoe Street)	24.5 km (15.2 mi)	Zephyr, Leaskdale	
Durham Regional Road 14	Liberty Street	Highway 401	Regional Road 4	8.9 km (5.5 mi)	Bowmanville, Hampton	
Durham Regional Road 15	Simcoe Street	Regional Road 23 (Osborne Street)	Durham–Victoria Boundary Road	8.7 km (5.4 mi)	Beaverton	Continues east as Kawartha Lakes Road 8 (Glenarm Road) in the City of Kawartha Lakes
Durham Regional Road 16	Ritson Road	Regional Road 60 (Wentworth Street)	Regional Road 3 (Winchester Road East)	11.3 km (7.0 mi)	Oshawa	
Durham Regional Road 17	Mill Street, Main Street, Manvers Road	Highway 401	Regional Road 4 (Taunton Road)	6.3 km (3.9 mi)	Newcastle	
Durham Regional Road 18	Newtonville Road	Highway 401	Regional Road 9 (Ganaraska Road)	11.9 km (7.4 mi)	Newtonville, Kendal	
Durham Regional Road 19	Shirley Road	Regional Road 2 (Simcoe Street)	Regional Road 57	11.0 km (6.8 mi)		
Durham Regional Road 20	Mosport Road, Boundary Road, Durham Road 20	Regional Road 57	Highway 35	12.5 km (7.8 mi)		
Durham Regional Road 21	Church Street, Goodwood Road	Regional Highway 47 (Main Street)	Highway 7 / Highway 12	18.4 km (11.4 mi)	Goodwood, Utica, Manchester	Continues east as Highway 7A towards Port Perry
Durham Regional Road 22	Bayly Street, Victoria Street, Bloor Street	Regional Road 38 (Whites Road)	Regional Road 34 (Courtice Road)	29.9 km (18.6 mi)	Pickering, Ajax, Whitby, Oshawa	
Durham Regional Road 23	Lakeridge Road, Osborne Street, Mara Road	Regional Road 22 (Bayly Street East / Victoria Street West)	Highway 12	74.4 km (46.2 mi)	Ajax, Whitby, Pickering, Vallentyne, Port Bolster, Beaverton	Lakeridge Road serves as a boundary line for three-quarters of the municipalities of Durham: Ajax, Pickering, and Uxbridge to the west; Whitby, Scugog, and Brock to the east.
Durham Regional Road 24	Church Street	Regional Road 22 (Bayly Street)	Durham Regional Highway 2 (Kingston Road)	1.0 km (0.62 mi)	Ajax	Regional Road 24 designation was retired from the CN Rail line towards Regional Highway 2 (Kingston Road West) in 2015.
Durham Regional Road 25	Consumers Drive, Stellar Drive, Champlain Avenue	Brock Street	Regional Road 53 (Stevenson Road)	5.1 km (3.2 mi)	Whitby, Oshawa	
Durham Regional Road 25A	Champlain Avenue	Regional Road 25 (Stellar Drive)	Regional Road 52 (Thornton Road)	1.7 km (1.1 mi)	Whitby, Oshawa	
Durham Regional Road 26	Thickson Road	Regional Road 60 (Wentworth Street West)	Highway 7 / Highway 12	15.3 km (9.5 mi)	Whitby, Brooklin	
Durham Regional Road 27	Altona Road,Whitevale Road	Regional Highway 2 (Kingston Road)	Regional Road 30 (York–Durham Line)	10.5 km (6.5 mi)	Pickering, Whitevale	
Durham Regional Road 28	Rossland Road, Peter Matthews Drive	Regional Road 43 (Cochrane Street)	Regional Road 33 (Harmony Road)	9.9 km (6.2 mi)	Whitby, Oshawa	
Durham Regional Road 29	Liverpool Road	Regional Road 22 (Bayly Street)	Regional Road 37 (Finch Avenue)	2.0 km (1.2 mi)	Pickering	
Durham Regional Road 30	York–Durham Line	Regional Road 40 / Regional Highway 47	Regional Road 39 (Queensville Sideroad)	18.4 km (11.4 mi)	Stouffville, Mount Albert	Continues east as Regional Road 39 (Scott Concession 3)
Durham Regional Road 31	Westney Road, 7th Concession	Regional Road 44 (Harwood Avenue)	Regional Road 1 (Brock Road)	18.7 km (11.6 mi)	Ajax, Greenwood	
Durham Regional Road 33	Harmony Road	Regional Road 22 (Bloor Street East)	Regional Road 3 (Winchester Road East)	10.3 km (6.4 mi)	Oshawa	
Durham Regional Road 34	Courtice Road, Enfield Road	Highway 401 / Service Road East	Regional Road 3	14.7 km (9.1 mi)	Courtice	
Durham Regional Road 35	Wilson Road	Regional Road 22 (Bloor Street East)	Regional Road 4 (Taunton Road East)	6.2 km (3.9 mi)	Oshawa	
Durham Regional Road 36	Hopkins Street, Anderson Street	Regional Road 25 (Consumers Drive)	Regional Road 28 (Rossland Road East)	3.7 km (2.3 mi)	Whitby	
Durham Regional Road 37	Finch Avenue	Regional Road 27 (Altona Road)	Regional Road 1 (Brock Road)	5.8 km (3.6 mi)	Pickering	
Durham Regional Road 38	Whites Road	Petticoat Creek Conservation Area	Highway 7	12.4 km (7.7 mi)	Pickering	Extended north to Highway 7 in February 2021 in order to have an interchange with Highway 407 as part of local development.
Durham Regional Road 39	Scott Concession 3, Durham Road 39	Regional Road 30 (York–Durham Line)	Regional Road 32 (Ravenshoe Road)	10.1 km (6.3 mi)	Zephyr	Continues south as Regional Road 30 (York–Durham Line)
Durham Regional Road 40	Alexander Knox Road				Pickering	
Durham Regional Road 41	Salem Road	Regional Road 22 (Bayly Street)	Regional Road 4 (Taunton Road)	6.4 km (4.0 mi)	Ajax	
Durham Regional Road 42	Darlington–Clarke Townline	Regional Highway 2 (King Street)	Regional Road 4 (Taunton Road)	8.1 km (5.0 mi)		
Durham Regional Road 43	Cochrane Street	Dundas Street West	Regional Road 28 (Rossland Road West)	2.1 km (1.3 mi)	Whitby	
Durham Regional Road 44	Harwood Avenue	Lake Driveway	Regional Highway 2 (Kingston Road)	4.7 km (2.9 mi)	Ajax	
Durham Regional Road 45	Henry Street	Regional Road 22 (Victoria Street)	Dundas Street West	2.0 km (1.2 mi)	Whitby	
Durham Regional Road 46	Brock Street South	Water Street	Highway 401	1.3 km (0.81 mi)	Whitby	Continues north as Durham Regional Highway 12
Durham Regional Road 47	Shore Line Road	Regional Road 23 (Mara Road)	Durham–Simcoe boundary	2.0 km (1.2 mi)		
Durham Regional Road 50	Portage Road, Canal Road, Durham Road 50	Ontario Highway 12	Durham Regional Highway 48	5.2 km (3.2 mi)	Brock	Section from Regional Road 51 to just north of Trent-Severn Waterway was the Old Highway 12 before diverting to the west.
Durham Regional Road 51	Old Highway 12 / Talbot Road	Talbot River	Regional Road 50	0.190 km (0.118 mi)	Brechin, Ontario, Beaverton, Ontario	Continues south as Regional Road 50 and north as Simcoe County Road 51. Original route of Ontario Highway 12 over Talbot River before being re-routed to the west. Road ends where bridge crossing beyond Durham Region into Simcoe County.
Durham Regional Road 52	Phillip Murray Avenue, Boundary Road, Thornton Road	Regional Road 54 (Park Road)	Regional Road 4 (Taunton Road)	7.8 km (4.8 mi)	Oshawa, Whitby	Split into three sections; two sections are south of Highway 401 and the Canadian National Railway, while the northern section resumes on Thornton Road at Regional Road 25A (Champlain Avenue)
Durham Regional Road 53	Stevenson Road	Regional Road 52 (Phillip Murray Avenue)	Regional Road 28 (Rossland Road West)	6.4 km (4.0 mi)	Oshawa	
Durham Regional Road 54	Park Road	Regional Road 52 (Phillip Murray Avenue)	Regional Road 28 (Rossland Road West)	6.4 km (4.0 mi)	Oshawa	
Durham Regional Road 55	Townline Road	Regional Road 59 (Olive Avenue)	Regional Road 4 (Taunton Road)	5.2 km (3.2 mi)	Oshawa, Courtice	
Durham Regional Road 56	Farewell Street	Approx. 220 m south of Harbour Road	Regional Road 22 (Bloor Street East)	1.8 km (1.1 mi)	Oshawa	
Durham Regional Road 57	Waverley Road, Martin Road, Durham Road 57, New Scugog Road, Blackstock Road, Caesarea Road, Bowmanville Avenue	Highway 401	Durham–Kawartha Lakes boundary	41.9 km (26.0 mi)	Bowmanville, Blackstock, Caesarea	Continues east as Kawartha Lakes Road 57
Durham Regional Road 58	Manning Road, Adelaide Avenue	Brock Street	Regional Road 55 (Townline Road)	10.1 km (6.3 mi)	Whitby, Oshawa	Manning and Adelaide are separated at the Whitby–Oshawa boundary by the Mount Lawn Cemetery. Closing this gap is part of the Durham Region Transportation Master Plan. There is also an environmental assessment underway for a planned eastern extension of Adelaide Avenue from Regional Road 55 (Townline Road) to Trulls Road.
Durham Regional Road 59	Gibb Street, Olive Avenue	Regional Road 52 (Thornton Road)	Regional Road 55 (Townline Road)	6.6 km (4.1 mi)	Whitby, Oshawa	Gibb Street and Olive Avenue are separated at Regional Road 2 (Simcoe Street). This corridor has been identified as a bottleneck and an environmental assessment is underway to determine a solution.
Durham Regional Road 60	Wentworth Street	Regional Road 26 (Thickson Road South)	Regional Road 56 (Farewell Street)	5.5 km (3.4 mi)	Whitby, Oshawa	Wentworth Street is discontinuous between Stevenson Road and Park Road by the General Motors of Canada Oshawa Assembly Plant.

~
