= Scugog =

- Township (lower-tier)
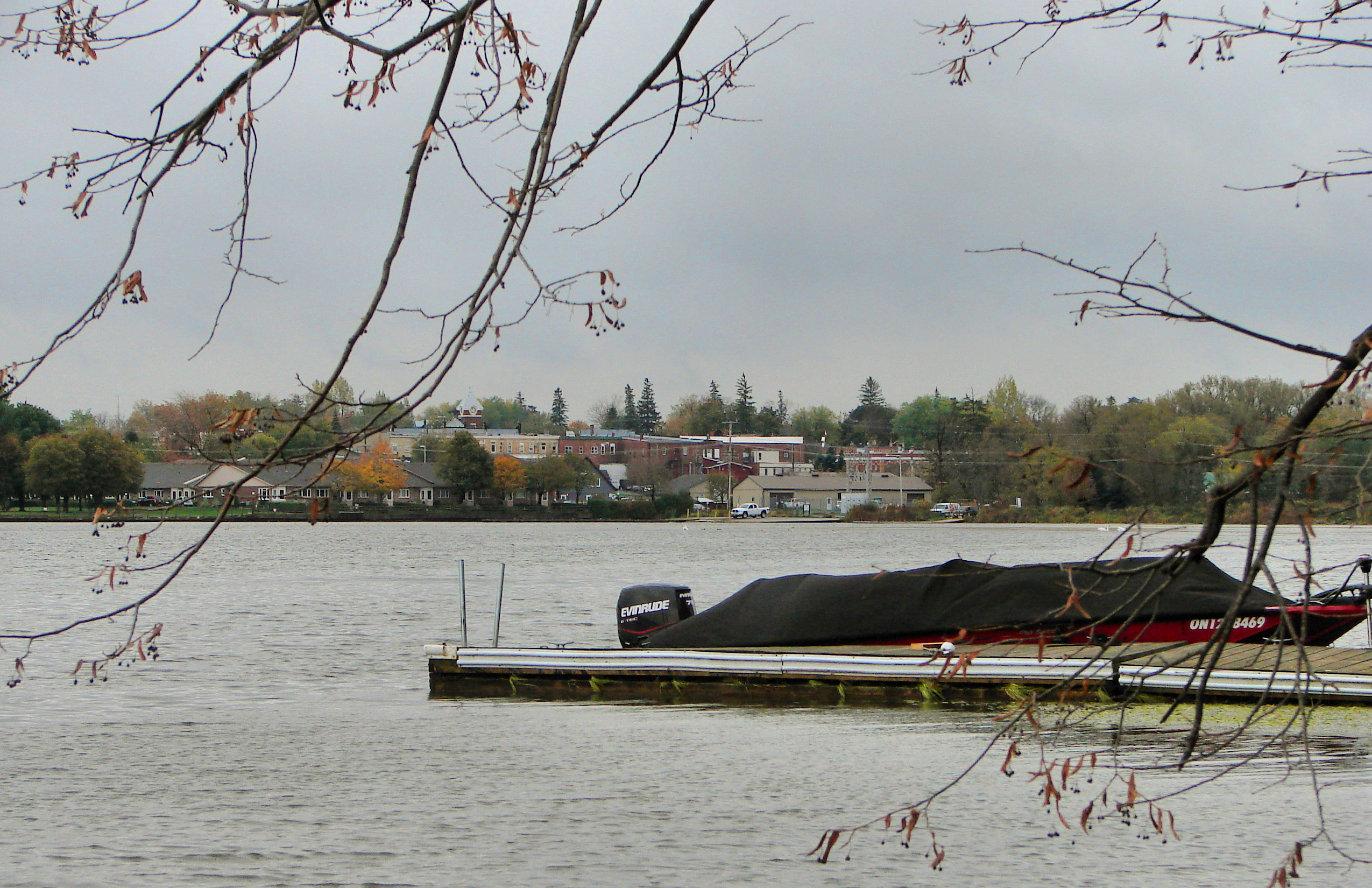
- Port Perry and Lake Scugog

- Location within Regional Municipality of Durham Location within Southern Ontario
- Coordinates: 44°08′25″N 78°54′55″W
- Country: Canada
- Province: Ontario
- Regional Municipality: Durham
- Established: January 1, 1974

Government
  - Mayor: Wilma Wotten
  - Councillors: List: David LeRoy; Janna Guido; Robert Rock; Harold Wright; Terry Coyne
  - MP: Jacob Mantle – York—Durham
  - MPP: Todd McCarthy – Durham

Area
  - Land: 474.65 km^{2} (183.26 sq mi)

Population (2016)
  - Total: 21,617
  - Density: 45.4/km^{2} (118/sq mi)
- Time zone: UTC-5 (EST)
  - Summer (DST): UTC-4 (EDT)
- Area codes: 905, 289, 365, and 742
- Website: www.scugog.ca

Scugog is a township in the Regional Municipality of Durham, south-central Ontario, Canada. It is northeast of Toronto and just north of Oshawa. The anchor and largest population base of the township is Port Perry. The township has a population of roughly 22,500. A smaller Scugog Township was also a historic municipality and geographic township prior to the amalgamation that formed the current municipality.

== History ==
The original township of Scugog used to be divided between Reach and Cartwright townships in Ontario County and Northumberland and Durham County, respectively. When Lake Scugog was created by a dam in Lindsay in 1834, flooding created an island known as Scugog Island. The island was separated from Reach and Cartwright to form Scugog Township in 1856. In 1874 George Currie built a grain elevator which is currently Canada's oldest grain elevator. The new township was part of Ontario County.

According to Alan Rayburn's Place Names of Ontario, the name Scugog is derived from the Mississauga word sigaog, which means "waves leap over a canoe." This refers to the creation of Lake Scugog. Other sources indicate that it is an Ojibwe word meaning swampy or marshy land. The existence of two other lakes by the same name (neither of which is artificial) lends support to the latter etymology.

The current township of Scugog was created in 1974 through the amalgamation of the original townships of Scugog, Reach and Cartwright and the town of Port Perry.

== Local government ==
Interactive map of Scugog electoral wards

The Township of Scugog is governed by a mayor, and five councillors elected on the basis of one per ward. Ward 1 includes Greenbank, Seagrave, Epsom, Utica and Manchester. Ward 2 is Port Perry (South of 7A) and Prince Albert. Ward 3 is Scugog Island. Ward 4 is Blackstock, Nestleton Station, Nestleton and Caesarea. Ward 5 is Port Perry (north of 7A). The council holds regular meetings, open to the public at the town hall in Port Perry.

Mayor: Wilma Wotten

Councillors:

- Ward 1: David Le Roy
- Ward 2: Janna Guido
- Ward 3: Robert Rock
- Ward 4: Harold Wright
- Ward 5: Terry Coyne

== Current municipality ==
Port Perry is the chief commercial and administrative centre of the municipality. The township also includes the communities of:

- Aldreds Beach – east side of Scugog Island at the eastern end of Demara Road
- Blackstock – east of Port Perry on Old Scugog Road between Church Street and Highway 7A
- Cadmus – east of Blackstock on Edgerton Road at Cartwright East
- Caesarea – opposite of Aldreds Beach on Lake Scugog on Scugog Road. First settled in 1836 and originally named Lasherville, the village got its current name from its largest landowner and Reeve. It got a post office in 1851.
- Carnegie Beach – northeast end of Scugog Island on Carnegie Beach Road
- Cedar Shores – opposite Honey Beach on Lake Scugog on Island Road at Pine Point Road
- Epsom – west of Port Perry and north of Utica on Reach Street at Marsh Hill Road
- Fralicks Beach – northwest side of Scugog Island on Mississauga Trail north of Hood Drive
- Gerrows Beach – opposite of Highland Beach on Scugog Island
- Greenbank – northwest of Port Perry
- Highland Beach – located just north of Port Perry
- Honey Beach – east side of Scugog Island at end of Whitfield Road
- Lakeside Beach- opposite of Honey Beach on Lake Scugog
- Manchester – southwest of Port Perry on Highway 12
- Marsh Hill – northwest of Greenbank
- McLaren's Beach – north of Pine Point
- Nestleton – north of Nestleton on McLaughlin Road
- Nestleton Station – northeast of Blackstock on Highway 7A near Nestleton Road
- Pine Point – south of Aldreds Beach on Point Point Road east of Mississauga Trail
- Port View Beach – opposite of Port Perry on Scugog Island
- Prince Albert – located southwest of Port Perry at King Street and Simcoe Road
- Prospect – southwest of Port Perry on Highway 7 and Scugog Line 2
- Purple Hill on Shirley Road and west of Cartwright West Quarter Line
- Reserves # 34 of the Mississaugas of Scugog First Nations consists of two tracts, east of Mississauga's Trail between Hood Drive and Pogue Road as well as west of Mississauga's Trail from Pogue Road to Seven Mile Island Road/Chandler Drive. Great Blue Heron Casino is located on the reserve. A Health and Resource Centre and Reserves Administration Office are located on Island Road.
- Saintfield – north of Greenbank on Highway 7/12 at Saintfield Road
- Saint Christopher – due east of Scugog Point
- Scugog – at Island Road and Chandler Road just north of Scugog Centre
- Scugog Centre – east of Lakeside Beach at Island Road and Demara Road
- Scugog Point – north of Nestleton Station on east shore of Lake Scugog
- Seagrave – north of Port Perry on Simcoe Street
- Shirley – southeast of Port Perry on Shirley Road at Sandy Road
- Strattonville – west of Epsom and due east of Uxbridge
- Sunrise Beach- east side of Scugog Island at east end of Chandler Drive
- Sunset View – opposite of Honey Beach on Lake Scugog
- Utica – west of Port Perry and south of Epsom on Regional Road 21 and Marsh Hill Road
- Victoria Corners – northwest of Greenbank and near Leaskdale on Victoria Corners Road and Lake Ridge Road
- Williams Point – southwest of Scugog Point along east shore of Lake Scugog near Nestleton Road and Scugog Road

== Schools ==
Public Schools:

- R.H. Cornish P.S
- S.A. Cawker P.S
- Prince Albert P.S
- Cartwright P.S
- Greenbank P.S

High Schools:

- Port Perry High School

Catholic Schools:

- Good Shepheard Catholic School

== Economy ==
The largest private-sector employer in the area is the Great Blue Heron Casino, located on the Scugog First Nation on Scugog Island. Schneider Meats also has a facility in the Township. The Township is also a popular tourist destination due to the casino and recreational opportunities from Lake Scugog. Many residents also commute to other Durham Region communities and further afield by road.

== Attractions ==
- Nonquon Provincial Wildlife Area – 1,120-hectare (2,800 acre) protected area located northwest of Port Perry and managed by Ontario Ministry of Natural Resources
- Ocala Orchards Farm Winery – 100 acre winery established in 1995 by Irwin and Alissa Smith south of Utica
- Scugog Shores Museum
- Theatre on The Ridge
- Oakridges Moraine Trail – located at south end of Scugog
- Historic Downtown Port Perry
- Lake Scugog waterfront

== Transportation ==
=== Roads and highways ===
Main roads in Scugog are:

- Simcoe Street (Durham Regional Road 2) – connect communities north and south from Port Perry
- Highway 7/Highway 12 – connects communities south and north of Greenbank, as well as to Oshawa
- Highway 7A – connects communities east and west of Port Perry
- Island Road (Durham Regional Road 7) – north and south areas on the west side of Scugog Island

=== Airports ===
There are two airports in Scugog, both are public airfields used by small propeller aircraft:

- Greenbank Airport
- Port Perry/Hoskin Aerodrome

Lakeridge Health Port Perry site has a helipad for air ambulance use only.

== Demographics ==
Historical populations
Year	Pop.	±%
1991	17,810	—
1996	18,837	+5.8%
2001	20,173	+7.1%
2006	21,439	+6.3%
2011	21,569	+0.6%
2016	21,617	+0.2%
2021	21,581	−0.2%

In the 2021 Census of Population conducted by Statistics Canada, Scugog had a population of 21,581 living in 8,243 of its 8,734 total private dwellings, a change of −0.2% from its 2016 population of 21,617. With a land area of 474.38 km^{2} (183.16 sq mi), it had a population density of 45.5/km^{2} (117.8/sq mi) in 2021.

Panethnic groups in the Township of Scugog (2001−2021)
Panethnic group	2021		2016		2011		2006		2001	
Panethnic group	Pop.	%	Pop.	%	Pop.	%	Pop.	%	Pop.	%
European (Note: Statistic includes all persons that did not make up part of a visible minority or an indigenous identity.)	19,670	92.41%	20,140	94.78%	20,370	96.11%	20,585	97.31%	19,325	96.79%
Indigenous	500	2.35%	445	2.09%	315	1.49%	180	0.85%	235	1.18%
East Asian (Note: Statistic includes total responses of "Chinese", "Korean", and "Japanese" under visible minority section on census.)	300	1.41%	155	0.73%	205	0.97%	160	0.76%	135	0.68%
South Asian	295	1.39%	150	0.71%	40	0.19%	75	0.35%	60	0.3%
African	155	0.73%	120	0.56%	30	0.14%	70	0.33%	80	0.4%
Middle Eastern (Note: Statistic includes total responses of "West Asian" and "Arab" under visible minority section on census.)	95	0.45%	25	0.12%	60	0.28%	15	0.07%	0	0%
Southeast Asian (Note: Statistic includes total responses of "Filipino" and "Southeast Asian" under visible minority section on census.)	85	0.4%	120	0.56%	65	0.31%	25	0.12%	115	0.58%
Latin American	85	0.4%	45	0.21%	50	0.24%	15	0.07%	10	0.05%
Other/multiracial (Note: Statistic includes total responses of "Visible minority, n.i.e." and "Multiple visible minorities" under visible minority section on census.)	105	0.49%	70	0.33%	35	0.17%	50	0.24%	25	0.13%
Total responses	21,285	98.63%	21,250	98.3%	21,195	98.27%	21,155	98.68%	19,965	98.97%
Total population	21,581	100%	21,617	100%	21,569	100%	21,439	100%	20,173	100%
Note: Totals greater than 100% due to multiple origin responses

== In film ==
- The 1973 TV movie, The Thanksgiving Treasure, starring Jason Robards, was partially filmed at the general store in Seagrave, and at a farm on Old Simcoe Road just to the west of Seagrave.
- The 1978 TV movie, Home to Stay, starring Henry Fonda, was shot on a farm on 12 Scugog Line and at Seagrave.
- Parts of the 1996 film Fly Away Home were filmed in Scugog.
- The downtown scenes from 2004's Welcome to Mooseport were shot in Port Perry.
- The downtown scenes from Hemlock Grove were shot in Port Perry.
- In Season 3 "Lakeside" of American Gods, some parts were shot in downtown Port Perry. They painted the mill black and made other little changes around the town.

== See also ==
- List of townships in Ontario
