= Ontario Highway 7A =

Ontario provincial highway

Highway 7A
- A map of Highway 7A

Route information
- Auxiliary route of Highway 7
- Maintained by The Ministry of Transportation of Ontario
- Length: 48.3 km (30.0 mi)
- Existed: November 29, 1933–present

Major junctions
- West end: Highway 7 / Highway 12 near Port Perry
- Highway 35 north - Lindsay; Highway 35 south - Newcastle
- East end: Highway 115 near Peterborough

Location
- Country: Canada
- Province: Ontario
- Towns: Port Perry, Bethany

Highway system
- Ontario provincial highways; Current; Former; 400-series
← Highway 7	→ Highway 8
Former provincial highways
Highway 7B →

King's Highway 7A, commonly referred to as Highway 7A, is a provincially maintained highway in the Canadian province of Ontario that serves as a bypass of Highway 7. The highway begins in the community of Manchester, where Highway 7 is concurrent with Highway 12, and travels east through Port Perry, Nestleton Station, Bethany and Cavan, ending at Highway 115 southwest of Peterborough. From there, Highway 7 can be reached via Highway 115 northbound. Near its midpoint the route is concurrent with Highway 35 for 1.5 kilometres (0.93 mi).

Highway 7A is 48.3 kilometres (30.0 mi) long, passing through the Regional Municipality of Durham, city of Kawartha Lakes and Peterborough County. Outside of the communities it serves, the highway passes through generally agricultural areas, though it enters the Oak Ridges Moraine near Highway 35.

The highway was designated in the 1930s in downtown Peterborough and shortly thereafter was extended west to Manchester. The causeways over Lake Scugog date back to the 1850s, and were repeatedly reinforced over the course of a century to reach their current state. During the 1950s, the construction of Highway 115 caused the route of Highway 7A to be modified. At the end of the decade, the causeways were reconstructed for the final time. The eastern end of the highway was reconfigured several times before arriving at its current routing after the 1960s.

== Route description ==
Highway 7A facing west from its eastern terminus at Highway 115

Highway 7A is a 48.3-kilometre (30.0 mi) highway which serves as an alternative route to Highway 7, bypassing Lindsay and providing a shorter and more direct southern route between Whitby and Peterborough. It begins in the community of Manchester at an intersection with Highway 7 and Highway 12. West of this intersection, the road continues as Durham Regional Road 21 towards Stouffville. The highway travels northeast into the town of Port Perry, where it curves east and becomes Scugog Street. Passing through the town, the highway serves as a commercial strip, centring on Simcoe Street. In the east end of the town, the highway passes several big-box retailers before crossing the western arm of Lake Scugog on the Scugog Causeway.

On Scugog Island now, the highway first passes Island Road (Durham Regional Road 7), which leads to Great Blue Heron Casino and the Mississaugas of Scugog Island reserve, then curves southeast and enters the Osler Marsh. It once continued east along what is now Reader Road and curved southeast at the end of that road. The modern route, constructed when the causeways were reinforced in the 1960s, lies south of the original route. The route continues southeast across the Cartwright Causeway, separating the eastern arm of Lake Scugog from the marsh. After approximately a kilometre (0.6 miles), the highway curves east and continues for 1.5 kilometres (0.93 mi) to the end of the causeway. For the next 3.2 kilometres (2.0 mi), the highway travels straight to the east past farmland, then curves north near Blackstock. It intersects Durham Regional Road 57, which travels south to Bowmanville. The two routes travels north concurrently with for 1.2 kilometres (0.75 mi) before Road 57 departs north towards Caesarea as Highway 7A gently curves east and passes through the former railway village of Nestleton Station.

A reverse curve east of Port Perry. The Osler Marsh, a southern extension of Lake Scugog, is visible in the distance.

Returning to farmland, the highway enters the northern tip of the Oak Ridges Moraine and the terrain begins to undulate near the border between Durham Region and Kawartha Lakes. Eventually, the farmland transitions into forests and the highway dives into and out of glacial ravines; these form the headwaters of the Pigeon River. The route intersects Highway 35 approximately 11 kilometres (6.8 mi) east of Nesleton Station; both highways travel south concurrently for 1.5 kilometres (0.93 mi) before Highway 7A branches east and Highway 35 continues south to Orono and Newcastle. A carpool parking lot is also available at this junction.

Highway 7A continues east through a valley-ridden region containing a mix of thick deciduous forests and farmland. Shortly after passing the northern terminus of City Road 32 (Porter Road), the highway enters the village of Bethany, where it crosses the Victoria Rail Trail and intersects the southern terminus of City Road 38 (Ski Hill Road) before curving southeast and entering Peterborough County. The highway curves back to the east and passes through a final ravine. It crosses through farmland before entering the community of Cavan, where it meets County Road 10. Approximately 1.5 kilometres (0.93 mi) east of Cavan, Highway 7A ends at an interchange with Highway 115, which itself intersects and becomes concurrent with Highway 7 approximately 4.5 kilometres (2.8 mi) northeast of this point, thereafter continuing into Peterborough.

== History ==
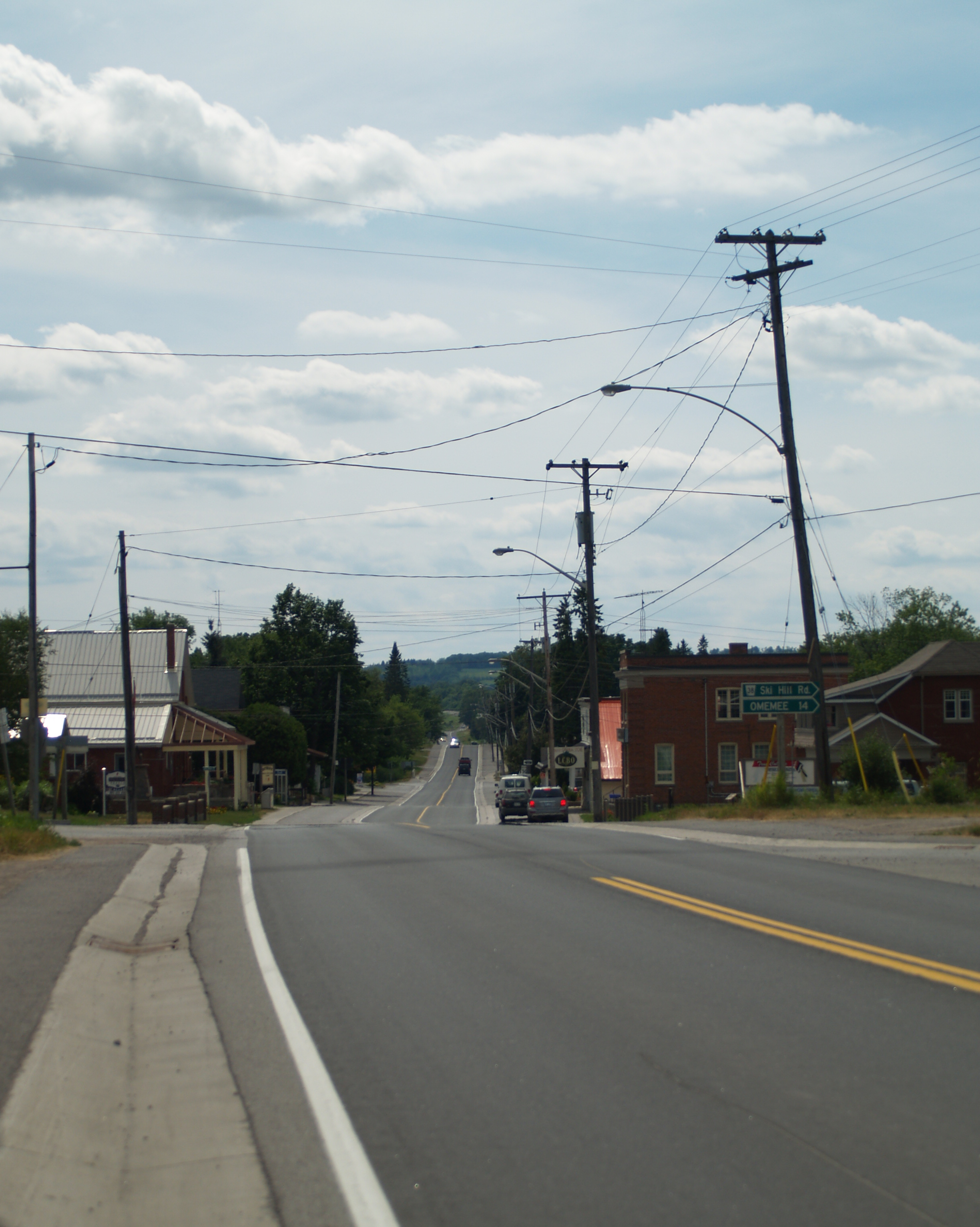
Highway 7A in Bethany

The history of Highway 7A is largely connected to that of Lake Scugog, and has played an important role for over a century, although the highway was not designated until the 1930s. Joseph Bigelow, a businessman and later the Reeve of Port Perry and James Graham, Reeve of Scugog, played a significant role in the construction of two causeways across the lake – the Scugog and the Cartwright Causeways. These were gradually reinforced over the span of a century (1856–1960) before reaching their present state, and now carry Highway 7A.

=== Development ===
Lake Scugog was created when William Purdy and his sons dammed the Scugog River in Lindsay (Upstream from the current dam and locks) in 1834 to power his grist mill. With the raised water levels, the highlands of Scugog Township became an island, separated from Cartwright Township to the southeast, and from Port Perry and Reach Township to the west. As a result, residents were forced to ferry across the lake during the summer and across the ice during the winter. The periods between were precarious, with many carts falling through the thawing ice and into the marsh. In 1852, Ontario County was formed, and residents began to petition the new government for construction of a bridge from Port Perry across to the island. Scugog Township passed Bylaw No. 2 on February 25, 1856, which granted $1000 towards construction of a floating bridge.

The bridge proved to be an expensive burden, and for many years the responsibility for maintaining it was repeatedly shifted from township to county and back again. Ice would often carry away entire sections of the bridge during the spring thaw, requiring replanking or complete reconstruction. In the spring of 1876, work began to convert the first 180 metres (590 ft) of the Port Perry side of the floating bridge into a permanent embankment. Logs were placed along both sides the bridge and various materials piled between them, sinking it into the soft soil below. Earth was laid over top to provide a stable surface. The process also increased the width of the roadbed from 3.7 metres (12 ft) to 5.5 metres (18 ft).

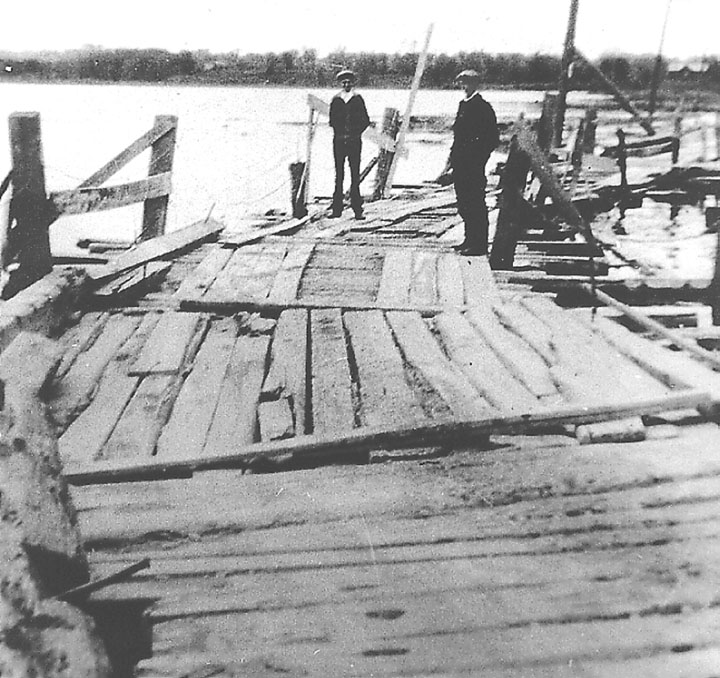
The floating bridge, shortly after completion in the 1850s

Further construction on the Scugog Causeway met fierce opposition from county officials, who argued that the new method had not even faced a winter season. It took until July 1878 for work to resume, when Port Perry Reeve Joshua Wright managed to manipulate the county council, convincing them "to strike out the magnificent $150 [grant for seasonal maintenance which they had offered] and stipulate that 600 feet be filled in on the east end of the bridge." A contract for this work was tendered in June 1879, and completed one year later. Finally, in early 1885, work on the final 180 metres began. This work was completed in July, at which point repairs were carried out on the existing sections.

Construction of the 4.2-kilometre (2.6 mi) Cartwright Causeway took place after nearly two decades of effort by its chief promoter, Joseph Bigelow. Bigelow witnessed the business opportunity that the Scugog Bridge opened up, and wished to construct a second structure towards Blackstock, opening the Port Perry markets to the fertile agricultural land of Cartwright Township. He first approached the Ontario County council in 1872 with his proposal, but was refused the funding. The council agreed to set up a committee, through which Bigelow sought out investors. In 1882, the Lake Scugog Marsh Lands Drainage Company, which had purchased the marshlands south of the proposed causeway, approached Bigelow with an offer to build his causeway as part of their plans to drain the marsh. They required a small investment in order to proceed with the work, but council ultimately refused even this, forcing the company to sell off its lands.

Undeterred, Bigelow continued to accrue funds from other level of government and surrounding townships. By 1889, he had enough to begin work. Unlike the Scugog Bridge, Bigelow ensured that his structure would be permanent from the beginning and constructed a majority of the causeway by removing the top layer of peat from the marsh, piling logs in lengthwise approximately a metre deep and covering the exposed surface with the same depth of earth. By early 1891, the causeway was completed, and shortly thereafter trees were planted along both sides.

The combined 12-kilometre (7.5 mi) route quickly grew to be the main east–west transportation corridor in the area. However, due to the soft soils and clay on which the causeway was built, it sank at a continuous rate and still required maintenance to keep it above water during the spring thaw. In 1928, both causeways were reinforced, widened and heightened in response to growing automobile usage.

=== King's Highway ===
Reconstruction of the Cartwright Causeway in late 1960

On November 29, 1933, the Department of Highways assumed Lansdowne Street in Peterborough as Highway 7A, providing an alternate route south of downtown. At that point in time, Highway 7 entered Peterborough by following Lindsay Street east from Fowlers Corners to Chemong Road and curving southeast. It followed Chemong Road to Reid Street, which it then followed south. The route proceeded west along McDonnel Street and south along George Street to Lansdowne Street, which it followed east out of Peterborough. Highway 28 entered Peterborough from the west along Lansdowne Street, curving north at what is now Ford Street. It followed this onto what is now Clonsilla Avenue, and curved east onto Charlotte Street, which it followed to George Street. Highway 7A thus provided a direct route between Highway 28 and Highway 7 south of Peterborough.

In May 1938, Highway 7A was extended west to Highway 7 and Highway 12 at Manchester via Bethany and Port Perry. This created a concurrency with Highway 28 and brought the length of the highway to 68 kilometres (42 mi). The new extension was a gravel road between Port Perry and Highway 28, but the section between Port Perry and Blackstock was paved by October 1939.

In late 1954, Highway 115 was opened between Highway 35 at Enterprise Hill and Highway 28 south of Springville. As a result, Highway 7A was rerouted concurrently along a short section of the new highway. Several highways were rerouted in 1960, including Highway 7, which was redirected at Fowlers Corners to curve south and meet Highway 28 near Springville; the former route became Highway 7B. During the spring of 2003, Highway 7A was truncated at Highway 115 near Cavan, taking on its current routing.

During the late 1950s, spring flooding began to become problematic on both causeways, prompting the Department of Highways to reconstruct them and the approaches. Soil investigations were carried out over the length of the road in mid-1959, and in August 1960 contracts were tendered for construction. The existing causeways were both closed as the adjacent marsh was excavated up to 6 metres (20 ft) deep. Nearby properties were purchased for the sole purpose of excavating for earth for fill, which was trucked at a continuous rate. Over 8,100,000 cubic feet (230,000 m^{3}) of organic material was removed from the marsh and 12,494,574 cubic feet (353,806.9 m^{3}) of fill placed over several years of construction. As a result of this, the roadbed no longer sinks into the marsh and spring melt no longer poses an issue.

== Major intersections ==
The following table lists the major junctions along Highway 7A, as noted by the Ministry of Transportation of Ontario.

Division	Location	km	mi	Destinations	Notes
Durham	Manchester	0.0	0.0	Regional Road 21 west (Goodwood Road) Highway 7 / Highway 12 / TCH – Whitby, Lindsay, Orillia	Manchester; western terminus; continues as Regional Road 21
Durham	Manchester	3.9	2.4	Regional Road 2 (Simcoe Street)	Port Perry
Durham	Manchester	6.3	3.9	Regional Road 7 (Island Road)	Scugog Island; access to Mississaugas of Scugog Island and Great Blue Heron Casino
Durham	Manchester	11.5	7.1	Regional Road 57 South – Bowmanville	Blackstock
Durham	Manchester	14.8	9.2	Regional Road 57 north (Caesarea Road) – Caesarea	
Kawartha Lakes		25.8	16.0	Road 5 north – Janetville	
Kawartha Lakes		28.9	18.0	Highway 35 north – Lindsay	Western end of Highway 35 concurrency
Kawartha Lakes		30.4	18.9	Highway 35 south – Newcastle	Eastern end of Highway 35 concurrency; commuter parking available
Peterborough	Cavan Monaghan	47.2	29.3	County Road 10	Cavan
Peterborough	Cavan Monaghan	48.3	30.0	Highway 115 – Peterborough, Toronto	Highway 115 exit 40; eastern terminus; formerly beginning of concurrency with Highway 115
Peterborough	Cavan Monaghan	53.0	32.9	County Road 28 south – Port Hope Highway 115 east – Peterborough	Highway 115 exit 45; former end of Highway 115 concurrency; Highway 7A follows present-day Highway 7; formerly Highway 28 south
Peterborough	Cavan Monaghan	56.6	35.2	Highway 7 / TCH – Lindsay, Peterborough; County Road 15 east (Monaghan Parkway)	Former eastern terminus; Highway 7 east formerly followed present-day County Road 15 east
1.000 mi = 1.609 km; 1.000 km = 0.621 mi: Closed/former; Concurrency terminus
