= Ontario Highway 7 =

Ontario provincial highway

Highway 7

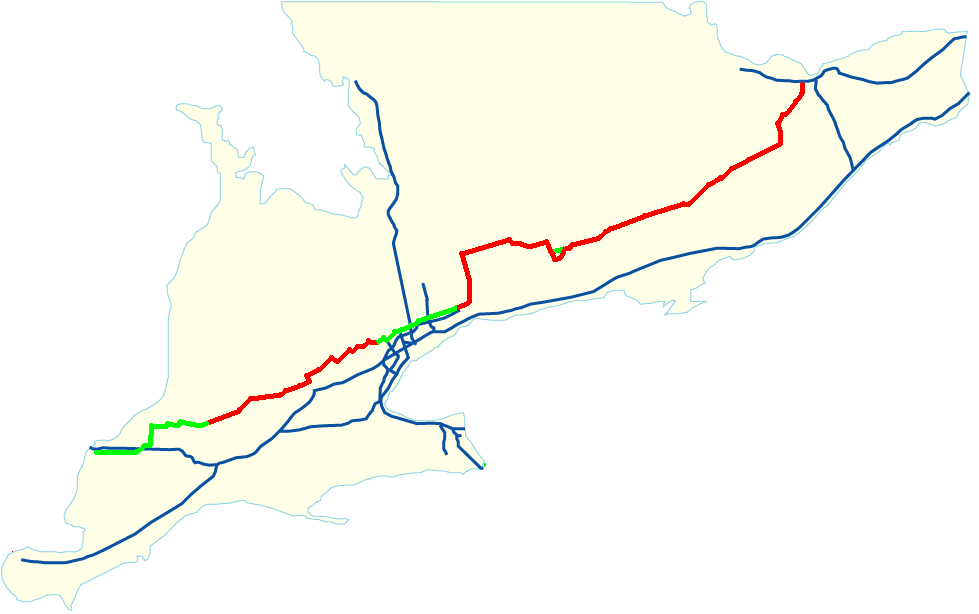

Route information
- Maintained by Ministry of Transportation of Ontario
- Length: 535.7 km (332.9 mi)
- Existed: 1920–present

Western segment
- Length: 154.1 km (95.8 mi)
- West end: Highway 4 – Elginfield
- Major intersections: Highway 23; Highway 8 – Kitchener; Highway 6 – Guelph
- East end: Halton–Peel boundary (near Norval)

Eastern segment
- Length: 381.6 km (237.1 mi)
- West end: Reesor Rd - Markham
- Major intersections: Highway 412 – Whitby; Highway 7A – Port Perry; Highway 12 – Sunderland; Highway 35 – Lindsay; Highway 115 – Peterborough; Highway 28 – Peterborough; Highway 62 - Madoc; Highway 37 – Actinolite; Highway 41 – Kaladar; Highway 15 – Carleton Place
- East end: Highway 417 – Ottawa

Location
- Country: Canada
- Province: Ontario
- Divisions: Middlesex, Oxford County, Halton, York, Durham, Kawartha Lakes, Peterborough, Hastings, Lennox and Addington, Frontenac, Lanark
- Major cities: Stratford, Kitchener–Waterloo, Guelph, Brampton, Vaughan, Markham, Pickering, Peterborough, Ottawa
- Towns: Halton Hills (Acton, Georgetown, Norval), Richmond Hill, Whitby, Lindsay, Perth, Carleton Place

Highway system
- Ontario provincial highways; Current; Former; 400-series
← Highway 6	→ Highway 7A

King's Highway 7, commonly referred to as Highway 7, and historically as the Northern Highway, is a provincially maintained highway in the Canadian province of Ontario. At its peak, Highway 7 measured 716 kilometres (445 miles) in length, stretching from Highway 40 east of Sarnia in Southwestern Ontario, passing through the Greater Toronto Area (GTA) (although bypassing Toronto proper), and on to Highway 17 west of Ottawa in Eastern Ontario. However, due in part to the construction of Highways 402 and 407, the province transferred the sections of Highway 7 west of London and through the GTA to county and regional jurisdiction. The highway is now 535.7 kilometres (332.9 mi) long; the western segment begins at Highway 4 north of London and extends 154.1 kilometres (95.8 mi) to Georgetown in the GTA, while the eastern segment begins at Donald Cousens Parkway in Markham and extends 381.6 kilometres (237.1 mi) to Highway 417 in Ottawa.

Highway 7 was first designated in 1920 between Sarnia and Guelph and extended to Brampton the following year. Between 1927 and 1932, the highway was more than doubled in length as it was gradually extended eastward to Perth, where Highway 15 continued to Ottawa via Carleton Place. In the early 1960s, that section of Highway 15 was renumbered as Highway 7. In that same decade, the Conestoga Parkway through Kitchener and the Peterborough Bypass were constructed. During the 1970s and 1980s, many sections of Highway 7 were widened from the initial two lane cross-section to four or six lanes. Within central York Region, where it would share a narrow corridor with the then-future Highway 407, the route was upgraded to a limited-access, suburban arterial expressway in preparation for the construction of the latter route.

Soon thereafter, that new tollway would act as justification for transferring the section of Highway 7 through the GTA to regional governments – despite the fact that the western terminus of the 407 is at the junction of the Queen Elizabeth Way and Highway 403 in Burlington; too far south to provide any continuity with Highway 7, and also that the highway could have remained intact as a municipally-maintained connecting link as is typically the case where a through-highway traverses an urban area. The sections became Peel Regional Road 107 (following Bovaird Drive and Queen Street from west and east of Highway 410 respectively), and York Regional Road 7. In the west, the construction of Highway 402 between Sarnia and London provided an uninterrupted alternative to Highway 7, resulting in the transfer of the section west of Highway 4. A third transfer took place in Peterborough, briefly separating the route into three discontinuous segments, but has since been rectified by renumbering a section of Highway 7A. From 2007 to 2012, the section of Highway 7 between Carleton Place and Ottawa has been widened to a divided freeway. In addition, work is underway to extend the Conestoga Parkway to New Hamburg as well as to build a new freeway between Kitchener and Guelph.

The speed limit is 110 km/h (68 mph) for the freeway portion between Carleton Place and Highway 417 and the section running concurrent with Highway 115, and ranges from 50 km/h (31 mph) to 100 km/h (62 mph) elsewhere. The route is patrolled by the Ontario Provincial Police (OPP) and maintained by the Ministry of Transportation of Ontario (MTO).

== Route description ==
Originally, Highway 7 extended as far west as Sarnia, remaining as a provincial highway for some time after the completion of the extension of Highway 402 to London. At Warwick, Highway 7 crosses Highway 402, west of that point these routes ran parallel to each other for 40 km (both roads never being further than 2 kilometres apart) until Highway 40. Upon entering the Sarnia city limits from the east on Highway 7, drivers encountered a plethora of motels and restaurants, the Sarnia Airport, and attractions such as Hiawatha Racetrack and Waterpark, earning the stretch between Modeland Road and Airport Road the nickname of the "Golden Mile". The interchange with Highway 40 marked the former western terminus of Highway 7, thereafter the road continues as Exmouth Street as the opposing carriageways merge and follow an S-curve before passing Lambton Mall. Since being downloaded to municipal authorities, the former highway is now known as Lambton County Road 22 (London Line) and Middlesex County Road 7 (Elginfield Road).

=== Western segment ===
The current western segment of Highway 7 travels from Elginfield in Middlesex County in the southwest to the Halton–Peel border at Norval near Brampton, situated in the Greater Toronto Area; a distance of 152.6 kilometres (94.8 mi). The western segment was separated from the rest of Highway 7 on June 7, 1997, when the section from Brampton to Markham was downloaded due to the opening of Highway 407. A 23.4-kilometre (14.5 mi) portion of this segment, from Waterloo Regional Road 51 south of Baden to Highway 85 in Kitchener is a freeway, forming part of the Conestoga Parkway. Plans to build a freeway bypass of Highway 7 from Kitchener to Guelph are currently underway (see below).

The current route begins at Highway 4, approximately 20 kilometres (12 mi) north of London and immediately southeast of the village of Lucan; the former routing continued west along Elginfield Road through Parkhill and Arkona. Though the highway changes direction several times between Elginfield and Kitchener, it is mostly straight and two lanes wide, except east of New Hamburg where it widens to four lanes. Proceeding east-northeast through farmland, the highway meets the southern terminus of Highway 23 after 1.2 kilometres (0.75 mi). It continues, serving as the boundary between Lucan Biddulph to the north and Middlesex Centre to the south, and later as the boundary between Perth County to the north and Middlesex and Oxford counties, with the tripoint of the three at County Road 120A south of St. Marys. Southeast of St. Marys, Highway 7 curves northeast into Perth County until it reaches downtown Stratford, where it meets Highway 8.

The two highways travel east concurrently for 45.1 kilometres (28.0 mi), passing through the town of Shakespeare as it travels in a straight line through farmland. Southwest of New Hamburg, the route curves northeast into Waterloo Region, eventually widening into the four-lane Conestoga Parkway east of Nafziger Road. It follows this divided freeway past interchanges at Waterloo Regional Road 51 (Foundry Street) south of Baden, Waterloo Regional Road 12 (Queen Street/Notre Dame Drive) south of Petersburg, and Waterloo Regional Road 70 (Trussler Road) north of Mannheim, where it enters Kitchener and becomes surrounded by residential subdivisions. Within Kitchener, Highway 7 encounters interchanges at Waterloo Regional Road 58 (Fischer-Hallman Road)(at which point it widens to six lanes), Waterloo Regional Road 28 (Homer Watson Boulevard), Waterloo Regional Road 53 (Courtland Avenue), Waterloo Regional Road 15 (King Street)/Highway 8 (at which point it widens to eight lanes), Waterloo Regional Road 14 (Ottawa Street) and Waterloo Regional Road 55 (Victoria Street). The Highway 8 concurrency ends at the King Street interchange, with it diverging southeast onto the Freeport Diversion. Highway 7 exits at Victoria Street (four-lane arterial) while the parkway continues north into Waterloo as Highway 85. Construction began in June 2015 on a future freeway between Kitchener and Guelph that will make use of a reconfigured Wellington Street interchange, just north of Victoria Street, and tie in with the northern end of the Hanlon Expressway.

Highway 7 exits Kitchener after crossing the Grand River, where it enters farmland again for the brief 10-kilometre (6.2 mi) journey to Guelph along Victoria Street and Woodlawn Road. Midway between the two cities, the route enters Wellington County. Within Guelph, it meets Highway 6 at the northern end of the Hanlon Expressway. The two routes travel southeast along the expressway to Wellington County Road 124 (Wellington Street, former Highway 24), where Highway 7 branches northeast into downtown Guelph. It exits the city along York Road after crossing the Speed River, travelling parallel to and south of the Goderich–Exeter Railway. At Rockwood, the highway enters Halton Region (and officially the Greater Toronto Area) and begins to zig-zag through several communities in Halton Hills. These include Acton, where the route intersects former Highway 25, and Georgetown. Just east of Norval, the western section of Highway 7 ends at the Halton–Peel boundary.

=== Downloaded Peel-York segment ===
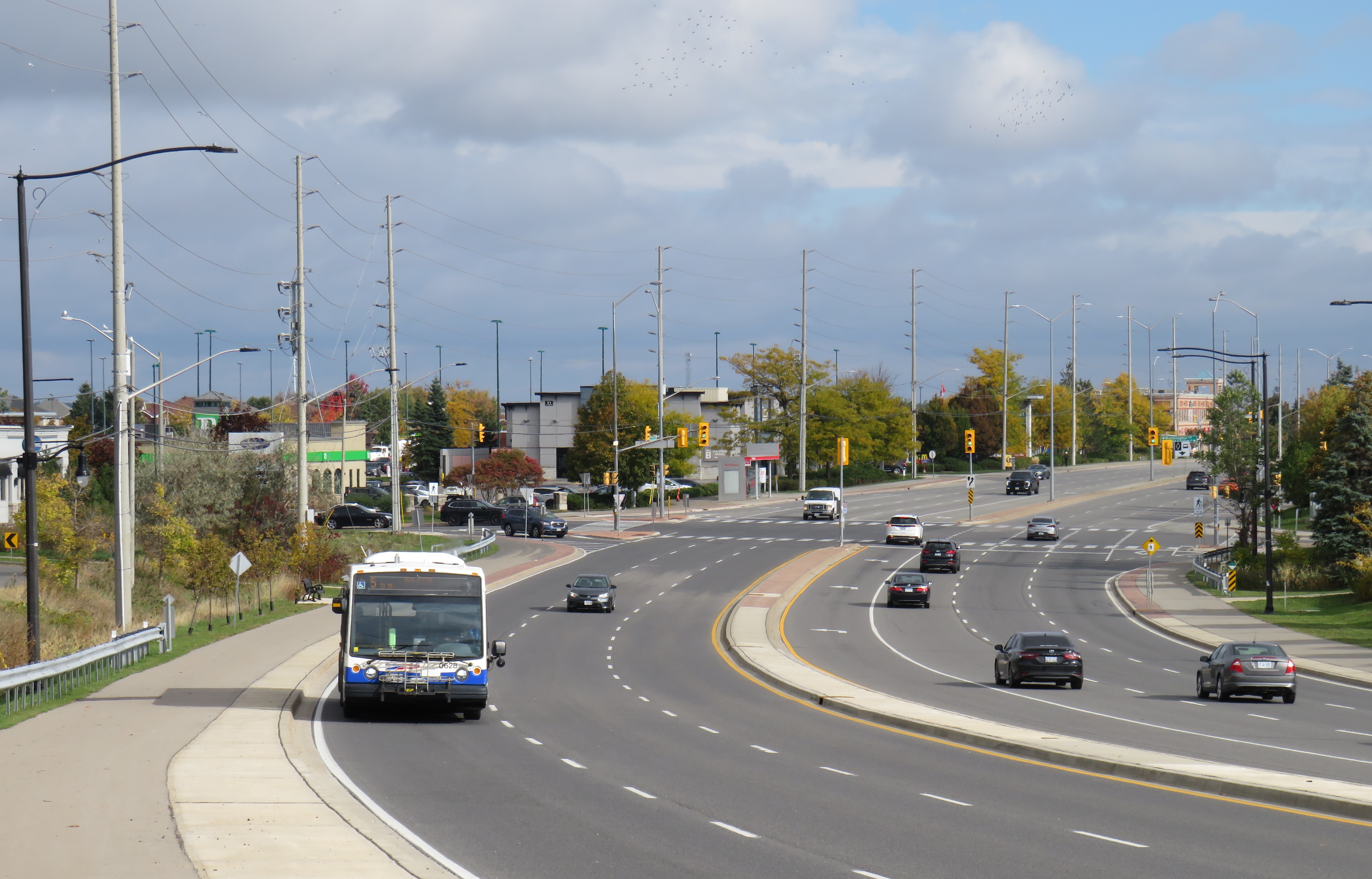
Bovaird Drive (Peel Regional Road 107) was part of the former Highway 7 route through Brampton

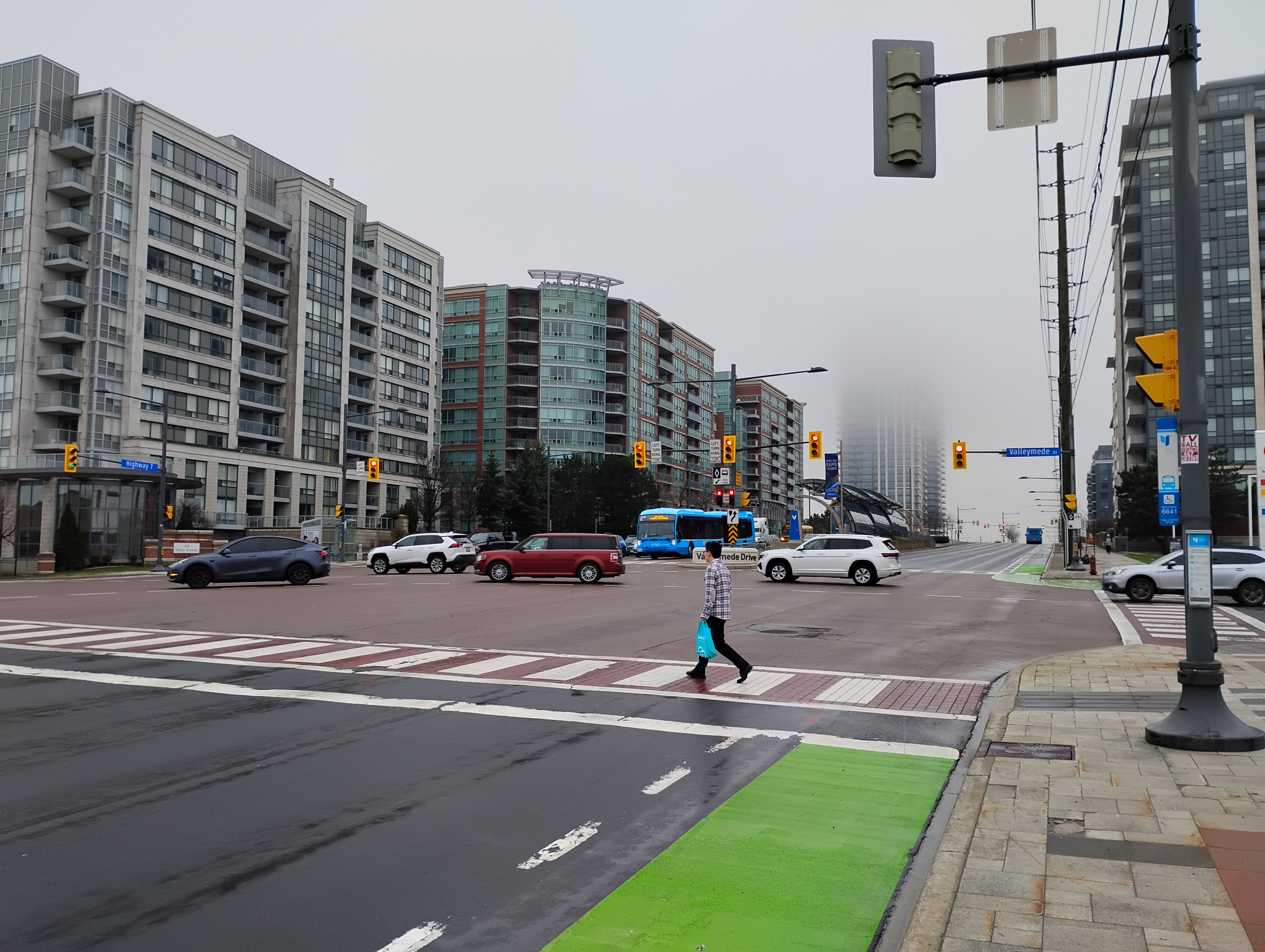
Unnamed urban arterial section of Highway 7 (now York Regional Road 7) along the boundary of Richmond Hill and Markham, with the Highway 7 Rapidway for Viva buses running down its centre

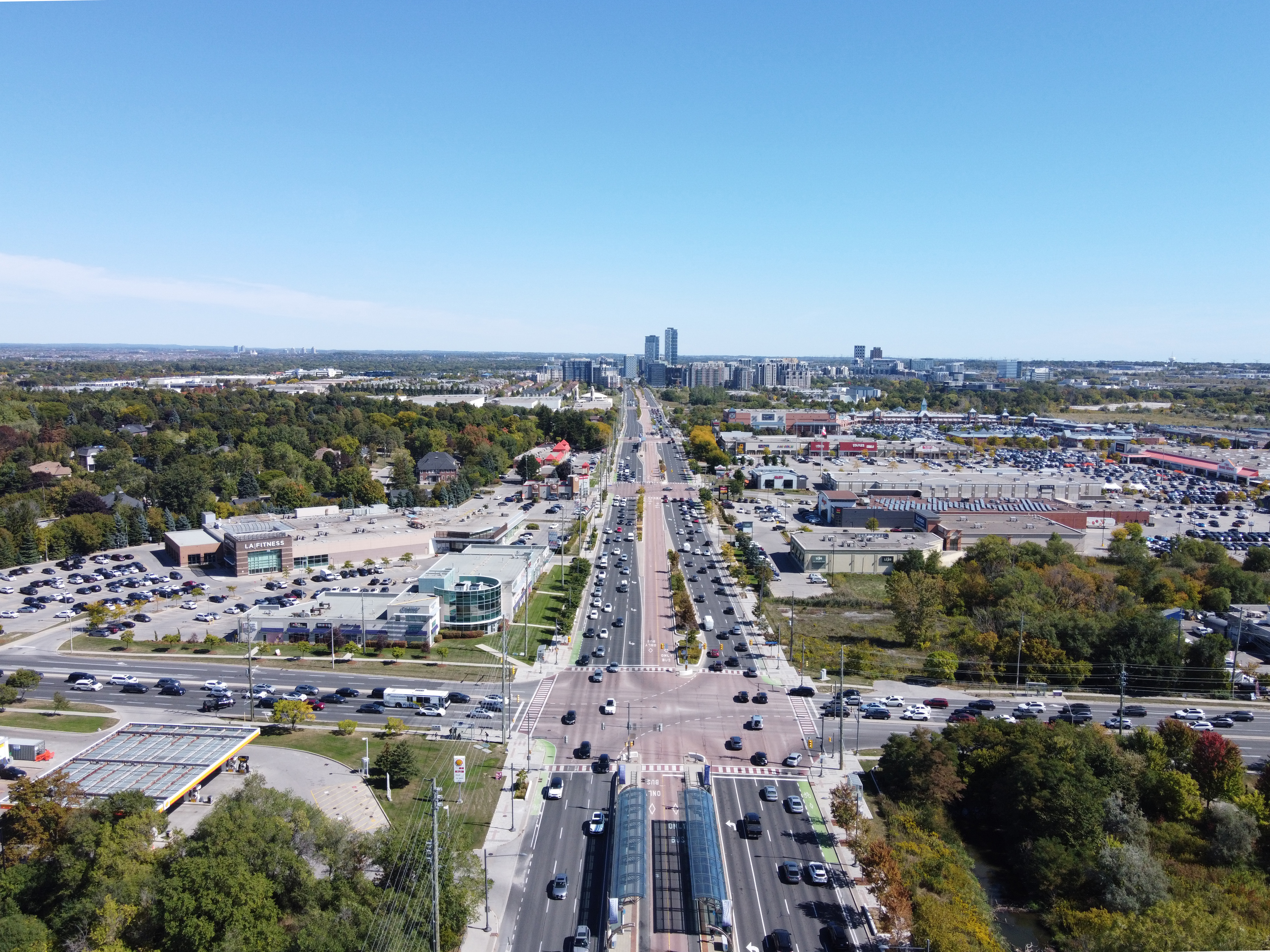
Highway 7 near Woodbine Avenue

The downloaded section of Highway 7 continues into Brampton as Peel Regional Road 107 as it enters the heavily urbanized part of the GTA. Now named Bovaird Drive, it soon widens to a four-to six-lane, suburban arterial road. The former highway then follows Highway 410 south, where it continues east along Queen Street (also Peel Road 107).

Still an arterial, the former highway then enters York Region and the City of Vaughan, where it runs 2 kilometres (1.2 mi) north of Toronto proper; its closest approach to it. East of Highway 400, it passes through Vaughan Metropolitan Centre, Vaughan's planned downtown core, which is the northern terminus of the west arm of the Toronto subway's Line 1 Yonge-University. Beyond Keele Street, it curves to the north and becomes an at-grade expressway, through the vicinity of the Vaughan, Markham, and Richmond Hill tripoint. The expressway has a speed limit of 80 kilometres per hour (50 miles per hour), with few traffic signals. There are grade-separated crossings of Dufferin, Bathurst, and Yonge Streets, as well as Bayview Avenue, where there is insufficient space to accommodate both intersections for them and their interchange ramps for Highway 407, which runs alongside it, and these streets are accessed by signalized L-shaped connector roads. East of Bayview, Highway 7 resumes as an arterial road along the boundary of Markham and Richmond Hill as far as Highway 404, before running solely through Markham.

Despite its urbanized arterial setting through York Region, which includes a dedicated bus rapid transit facility (the Highway 7 Rapidway) running down its centre for most of the way across the region outside the expressway section, and no longer being a provincial highway since being downloaded to municipal authorities in 1997, the road is still officially named "Highway 7". However, it otherwise has no street name, and received the number York Regional Road 7, displacing Islington Avenue which was redesignated as Regional Road 17.

The Toronto Star ran a series of articles in 2013 depicting the urbanization of the downloaded Highway 7 in the Greater Toronto Area, including a proposed name change to "Avenue 7" through York Region, although this name has not been applied as of 2025.

Until 2015, Highway 407 merged into Highway 7 in Pickering at the intersection with Brock Road (Durham Regional Road 1); this section was rebuilt as Highway 407E, opening on June 20, 2016.

=== Eastern segment ===
The eastern segment of Highway 7 runs from Donald Cousens Parkway (York Regional Road 48) in Markham to Highway 417 in Ottawa, a length of 381.6 kilometres (237.1 mi). Between Brooklin and north of Sunderland, Highway 7 assumes a north–south routing and is concurrent with Highway 12. The section from Sunderland to the eastern terminus of the highway is designated as part of the Central Ontario Route of the Trans-Canada Highway.

Travelling east from Donald Cousens Parkway, Highway 7 exits the urbanized portion of Markham and the GTA and enters the Greenbelt, a large tract of land north of the GTA restricted from development. It curves north at the community of Locust Hill along an alignment that eliminated a jog, then curves back to the east as it crosses into Durham Region. It travels north of and parallel to Highway 407 to Brougham, curving to cross the former eastern terminus of the freeway near Brock Road (Durham Regional Road 1). East of the Highway 407 overpass, Highway 7 widens to four lanes and curves around the community of Greenwood and the hill that it stands on. The route crosses the northern end of Pickering, entering Whitby at Lake Ridge Road (Durham Regional Road 23). Between Lake Ridge Road and Highway 12, the route was rebuilt for the new Highway 407E and West Durham Link, with an overpass constructed at Cochrane Road. East of that, the route enters Brooklin and meets Highway 12.

Highway 7 and Highway 12 travel north concurrently from Brooklin through Durham Region to Sunderland. At Sunderland, Highway 7 departs to the east with the Trans-Canada Highway designation, officially leaving the Greater Toronto Area and entering the City of Kawartha Lakes. Despite its name, the highway passes through a mostly-rural landscape in Kawartha Lakes, bypassing south of Lindsay in the middle of the "city" along a brief concurrency with Highway 35. East of Lindsay, the route meanders southeast towards Peterborough, encountering the divided freeway, Highway 115, southwest of the city. The two routes travel east concurrently along the southern edge of Peterborough. Highway 115 and the divided freeway end at Lansdowne Street, onto which Highway 7 turns.

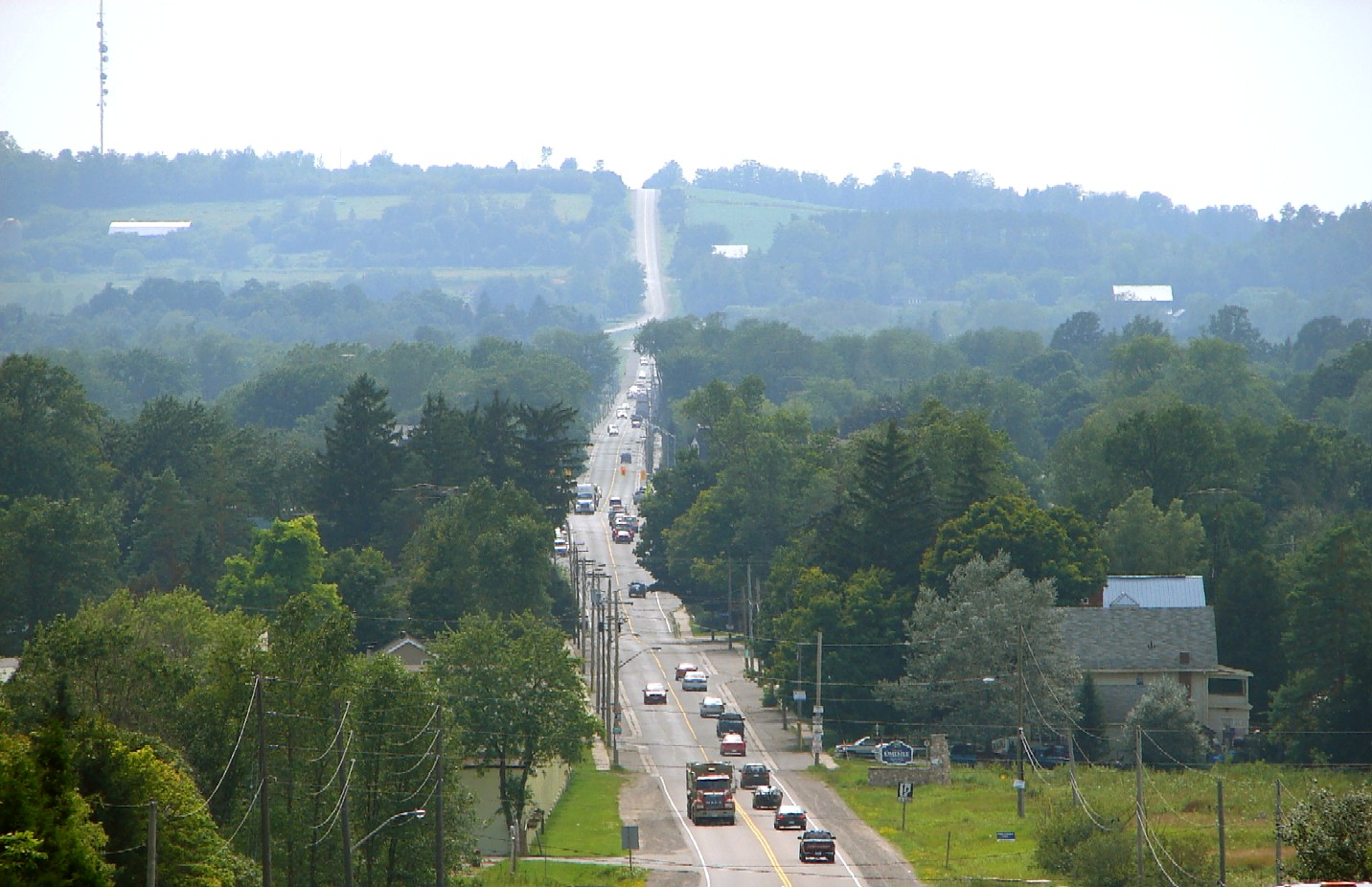
Highway 7 near Omemee, in the City of Kawartha Lakes

The segment between Peterborough and Perth was built in the 1930s during the Great Depression, as a public works employment project. It was constructed parallel to a CP Rail corridor (now abandoned east of Peterborough) that was built in the 1880s, and used hand-power to dig and build the road whenever possible. From Peterborough to Norwood, the route travels in a straight line through the Peterborough Drumlin Field, connecting to the southern terminus of Highway 28 and crossing the Indian River while otherwise passing through farmland. At Norwood the route suddenly begins to meander as it approaches the undulated Canadian Shield. The section east of Havelock to Perth, unlike the rest of the highway, travels through a relatively isolated area, with few services or residences along the route outside of the several towns that it connects. In contrast to the surroundings west of there, this section is located in dense forest with numerous lakes and muskeg dotting the landscape. It services the villages of Marmora, where it connects with the northern terminus of former Highway 14, Madoc, where it intersect Highway 62, Actinolite, where it meets the northern terminus of Highway 37, and Kaladar, where it intersects Highway 41.

East of Kaladar, Highway 7 begins to serve cottages along the shores of several large lakes that lie near the highway. It intersects the northern terminus of former Highway 38 near Sharbot Lake and later passes south of Maberly before exiting the Canadian Shield and reentering farmland. On the outskirts of Perth, the route meets former Highway 43 and curves northward. It travels around the western and northern shorelines of Mississippi Lake before passing directly south of Carleton Place. Just east of there, Highway 7 widens into a four-lane freeway for the remainder of the distance to Highway 417. This section, completed by early 2012, was built by "twinning" the existing two-lane highway with a second parallel carriageway to serve as the eastbound lanes. Highway 7 ends at a trumpet interchange with Highway 417, where drivers can proceed east to Ottawa or north to Arnprior.

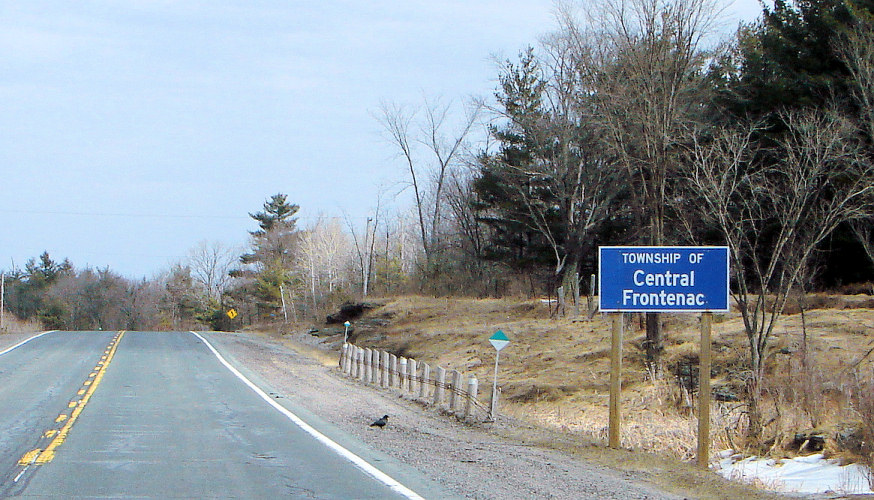
Highway 7 in Central Frontenac; this section passes through the sparsely developed terrain of the Opeongo Hills.

== History ==
The route which would later become Highway 7 was first established by the Department of Public Highways as part of the initial provincial highway network on February 26, 1920. This route connected Sarnia with Guelph. On April 27, 1921, the route was extended east to the Wellington–Halton boundary. Several days later, on May 4, the highway was extended further east to Hurontario Street in Brampton. The Great Northern Highway, as it was known at the time, was numbered as Highway 7 during the summer of 1925. Assumptions on June 22 and July 2, 1927 extended Highway 7 from Brampton to Peterborough. A portion of the original routing of Highway 12 between Sunderland and Lindsay was renumbered in this process and a concurrency established between Brooklin and Sunderland.

During the early 1930s, the DHO decided that Highway 7 would ultimately serve as the most direct route between Toronto and Ottawa; at that time the only option was via Highway 2 and Highway 16. The first step in this undertaking was to extend Highway 7 as far as Madoc along existing settler routes. This section was assumed on September 17, 1930. On November 18, 1931, construction was accelerated between Madoc and Perth as a major depression-relief project when eight contracts were set to build the new route. Over 2700 men blasted rock, dredged muskeg and endured a constant barrage of blood-sucking insects in order to construct this new link. The majority of it followed along a Canadian Pacific right-of-way (now abandoned past the town of Havelock) which had been cleared in 1881, deviating at times to provide a better alignment, avoid large muskeg or to lessen excavation work, most of which was performed by hand. On February 10 and February 17, the route, still incomplete, was surveyed and assumed as an extension of Highway 7. The new highway was opened to traffic on August 23, 1932.

Between the 1930s and 1960s, Highway 7 connected Sarnia with Perth; Highway 15 continued from Perth to Ottawa. By the mid-1950s, the well established highway network had changed travel characteristics, and the numbering of Highway 15 between Perth and Ottawa was confusing motorists. The Ottawa Board of Trade petitioned the Department of Highways to renumber several highways surrounding the city. The department performed a series of renumberings similar to these recommendations following the extension of Highway 43 on September 8, 1961. Highway 15 was rerouted between Smiths Falls and Carleton Place to travel concurrently with Highway 29; Highway 7 was extended along the former routing from Perth to Carleton Place and signed concurrently with Highway 15 eastward to Ottawa. This brought the highway to its peak length of 700 kilometres (430 mi).

At an at-grade intersection with Highway 40 (Modeland Road, formerly Lucasville Road), Highway 7 transitioned into Highway 402, inaugurated in 1953, which continued westwards to the Bluewater Bridge at the American border. In 1957, the DHO announced that Highway 402 would be extended east of Sarnia to London, starting with the construction of an interchange at Modeland Road to replace the at-grade intersection in 1963-64, although Highway 402 would continue to default to Highway 7 for the near future as the rest of the extension was still being planned. This interchange would serve as the terminus for a new bypass of Sarnia, as in 1980 a second overpass was built at this interchange during the twinning of Highway 40 to Wellington Street.

The extension of Highway 402 involved a new alignment east of Murphy Road to a new interchange with Highway 40, just north of the existing Highway 40 interchange with Highway 7, while Highway 7 would continue to a redirected Exmouth Street (causing a section of the latter to be bypassed and renamed as Old Exmouth Street). Highway 402 was completed between Sarnia and Highway 401 in 1982, and with traffic shifting to the newly completed freeway, this resulted in the redundancy of Highway 7 west of London.

Nonetheless, Highway 7 remained provincially maintained until the segment west of Highway 4 was transferred to county jurisdiction on January 1, 1998; a process referred to as downloading. The former highway is now known as Lambton County Road 22 (London Line) and Middlesex County Road 7 (Elginfield Road).

In 1987, a new segment was built to eliminate a jog along Bathurst Street in Vaughan in York Region; which resulted in a section between Bathurst and Dufferin Streets becoming a westerly extension of Centre Street. In the mid 1990s, as part of the Highway 407 project, Highway 7 around the tripoint area of Vaughan, Markham, and Richmond Hill in York was rebuilt on a new alignment as a six-lane at-grade expressway where the two highways were forced to share a narrow right-of-way through a hydro corridor due to suburban development abutting the corridor on both sides.

Broken parts of the original sections of Highway 7, named Langstaff Road, already bypassed prior to the expressway reconstruction, still remain in use between Bathurst Street and Bayview Avenue, but reverted to the original Langstaff Road name. Another former section from Bathurst to Yonge followed Centre Street (bypassed prior to the aforementioned later link which extended that street westwards), which requiring motorists to travel north along Yonge Street to rejoin eastbound on Highway 7 along the former route of Langstaff. The portion through Markham Village in Markham was once called Wellington Street before local names were eliminated along Highway 7 through York Region. A stub of the old road exists today west of Main Street Markham (former Highway 48) that was a result of a realignment of Highway 7.

=== Transfer of portions to lower governments (downloading) ===
In the late 1990s and early 2000s, the Ministry of Transportation (MTO) "downloaded" (i.e., transferred responsibility for) several sections of Highway 7 to regional and county governments. There are three separate issues that led to these downloads.

Due to budget cuts instituted by the Mike Harris government, many highways deemed to serve a local or regional function were downloaded to local jurisdiction. The sections of Highway 7 west of London were transferred to Lambton County and Middlesex County, largely supplanted by the completion of nearby Highway 402 in 1982. On April 1, 1997, the section from Sarnia to Thedford was transferred to Lambton County. The section from Thedford to Elginfield was transferred to Lambton and Middlesex counties on January 1, 1998.

As the construction of Highway 407 progressed across the northern end of Greater Toronto, the MTO transferred sections of Highway 7 to the regions of Peel and York. On June 7, 1997, the section between Highway 410 and Highway 404 was transferred to the regions of Peel and York; the section from Highway 404 to McCowan Road was transferred to York Region on April 1, 1999. Several months later, on September 1, a short section between McCowan Road and Markham Road was transferred. Finally, on January 25, 2007, the section between Markham Road and 185 metres (607 ft) east of Donald Cousens Parkway, where the highway narrows to two lanes today, was transferred. Within Peel Region, Highway 7 ran north–south concurrently with Highway 410 between Bovaird Drive and Queen Street. The Queen St. portion of the route was numbered Peel Regional Road 21 on July 10, 1997, but renumbered as Peel Regional Road 107 on March 26, 1998. To make the former highway easier to follow through Brampton, the Bovaird Drive portion of the route was subsequently also numbered Regional Road 107, after the highway was transferred to the Region of Peel on November 28, 2001. The non-Highway 7 portions of Queen Street and Bovaird Drive west and east of Highway 410 are designated as Regional Roads 6 and 10, respectively.

In the Peterborough area, Highway 7 was rerouted from travelling through the city to bypassing it along Highway 115. This situation took over six years to set in place. On April 1, 1997, the sections of Highway 7 entering the western edge of Peterborough along North Monaghan Parkway and Sir Sanford Fleming Drive were transferred to the county and city, creating a gap between Springville and the Peterborough Bypass. This situation was rectified on May 1, 2003, when the section of Highway 7A that until then was a continuation of the road south from Springville to Highway 115 was renumbered as Highway 7. The concurrency with Highway 115 was extended southwest to remove the discontinuity entirely.

=== Recent work ===
==== York Region ====
In 2005, Highway 7 was made the second main arterial for York Region's Viva Rapid Transit service (after Yonge Street), leading to the expansion of the CN MacMillan Bridge and Highway 400 overpass.

==== Carleton Place ====
On August 22, 2006, work officially began on a project to expand Highway 7 between Ottawa and Carleton Place into a freeway through a process known as twinning, in which a second carriageway is built parallel to an existing road and grade-separated interchanges constructed. Plans for this expansion were first conceptualized in 1979 when a planning study was undertaken. However, budgetary constraints forced an early end to this study in 1981. In 1988, the project was reinstated. A study released that year recommended that Highway 7 be widened to five lanes with a centre turning lane south of Carleton Place as an interim measure; this was carried out in 1993. Full planning on the four-laning of the route began in 1993.

In mid-2005, the Government of Ontario announced the project to the public. The work was carried out over three contracts: from Highway 417 to Jinkinson Road, from Jinkinson Road to Ashton Station Road, and from Ashton Station Road to Highway 15. In July 2007, a C$45 million contract was awarded to R.W. Tomlinson for the first phase of the route west from Highway 417. Bot Construction was awarded the $73.2 million contract for the second phase, which included two interchanges, four overpasses and service roads, in early 2008. The first phase was opened to traffic on July 31, 2008 Towards the end of 2009, the $25.8 million contract for the third phase was awarded to Aecon. The second phase was completed ahead of schedule on December 3, 2008, bypassing south of the former route at Ashton Station Road and merging to two lanes west of Dwyer Hill Road. The third phase was completed in late 2011/early 2012, connecting to Carleton Place.

In early 2011, Ontario Infrastructure Minister Bob Chiarelli hinted at possible plans to extend the four-laning of Highway 7 west from Carleton Place to Perth.

==== Proposed Kitchener–Guelph freeway ====
On March 23, 2007, the Government of Ontario announced the approval of an environmental impact assessment for a four-lane controlled-access highway between Kitchener and Guelph, as traffic on Highway 401 is growing steadily and approaching capacity, along with the current two-lane alignment of Highway 7. This would connect to the Conestoga Parkway via an expansion of the existing Wellington Road half-cloverleaf interchange, with additional semi-directional flyover ramps above making it a four level interchange. The eastern end of the proposed Highway 7 freeway would terminate at, and interline with, the Hanlon Expressway (Highway 6), which was also scheduled for upgrades to a full freeway beginning in June 2015; as of May 2026 construction has not begun. Combined with plans to extend the Conestoga Parkway westward to Stratford, this would result in the Highway 7 route following a continuous freeway all the way to Guelph.

As one of the prerequisite projects, on the Conestoga Parkway the Victoria Street overpass was demolished overnight on February 23–24, 2018, and was replaced with a new structure that reopened to traffic on October 28; the new bridge is longer and has a higher elevation to accommodate the future ramps between the Kitchener-Guelph freeway and the Conestoga Parkway.

In July 2020, the Ford government announced that it would fund the highway project linking Guelph and Kitchener and building a new bridge for the highway over the Grand River. It is expected to cost 764 million dollars for the 18-kilometre freeway.

== Major intersections ==
The following table lists the major junctions along Highway 7, as noted by the Ministry of Transportation of Ontario. In addition, it includes some minor junctions. Highway 7 is maintained under a Connecting Link agreement within Stratford, Guelph, Acton, Georgetown, Omemee, Havelock and Marmora.

Division	Location	km	mi	Exit	Destinations	Notes
Lambton	Sarnia	−101.6	−63.1		Lambton County Road 22 begins Highway 40 (Modeland Road) – Chatham	Former Highway 7 western terminus
Lambton	Plympton–Wyoming	−83.2	−51.7		County Road 21 (Oil Heritage Road)	Reece's Corners; formerly Highway 21
Lambton	Warwick	−62.5	−38.8		County Road 9 north / County Road 79 south (Nauvoo Road)	Formerly Highway 79 south; former western end of Highway 79 concurrency
Lambton	Warwick	−58.9	−36.6		County Road 22 east (Egremont Drive)	Formerly Highway 22 east; former Highway 7 / Highway 79 follow County Road 79 north (Arkona Road)
Lambton	Lambton Shores	−42.6	−26.5		County Road 6 west (Thomson Line) County Road 79 north (Arkona Road)	Formerly Highway 79 north; former eastern end of Highway 79 concurrency; former Highway 7 follows County Road 6 east (Elginfield Road)
Lambton–Middlesex boundary	Lambton Shores–North Middlesex boundary	−40.6	−25.2		Ausable River	
Lambton–Middlesex boundary	Lambton Shores–North Middlesex boundary	−40.6	−25.2		Lambton County Road 6 ends Middlesex County Road 7 begins	
Middlesex	North Middlesex	−29.1	−18.1		County Road 81 north (Main Street)	Parkhill; formerly Highway 81 north; former western end of Highway 81 concurrency
Middlesex	North Middlesex	−27.0	−16.8		County Road 81 south (Centre Road)	Formerly Highway 81 south; former eastern end of Highway 81 concurrency
Middlesex	Middlesex Centre–Lucan Biddulph boundary	0.0	0.0		Highway 4 – London, Lucan Highway 7 begins Middlesex County Road 7 ends	Elginfield; Highway 7 western terminus
Middlesex	Middlesex Centre–Lucan Biddulph boundary	1.2	0.75		Highway 23 north – Mitchell	
Middlesex	Middlesex Centre–Lucan Biddulph boundary	5.0	3.1		County Road 23 south (Highbury Avenue)	
Middlesex	Middlesex Centre–Lucan Biddulph boundary	5.3	3.3		County Road 59 north (Granton Line)	
Middlesex	Middlesex Centre–Lucan Biddulph–Thames Centre boundary	10.1	6.3		County Road 50 north (Prospect Hill Road)	
Perth–Middlesex boundary	Perth South–Thames Centre boundary	16.8	10.4		Perth County Line 27 south (Wellburn Road)	
Perth–Middlesex boundary	Perth South–Thames Centre boundary	17.6	10.9		Perth County Road 123 north – St. Marys	
Perth–Oxford boundary	Perth South–Zorra boundary	19.6	12.2		Perth County Road 120A north (James Street) – St. Marys	
Perth–Oxford boundary	Perth South–Zorra boundary	24.0	14.9		Perth County Road 118 north Oxford County Road 119 south – Thamesford	Formerly Highway 19 south; western end of former Highway 19 concurrency
Perth	Perth South	26.7	16.6		County Line 9 west (Perth Line 9) – St. Marys	
Perth	Perth South	31.7	19.7		County Line 20 west (Perth Line 20)	
Perth	Perth South	33.8	21.0		County Line 26 east (Perth Line 26)	
Stratford		36.0	22.4		Perth Line 29	Beginning of Stratford connecting link agreement
Stratford		36.9	22.9		County Road 113 south	
Stratford		40.0	24.9		Highway 8 west – Goderich	Western end of Highway 8 concurrency
Stratford		40.2	25.0		Waterloo Street	Formerly Highway 19 north; eastern end of former Highway 19 concurrency; to County Road 119 north
Stratford		43.3	26.9			End of Stratford connecting link agreement
Perth	Perth East	52.0	32.3		County Road 107	Shakespeare; formerly Highway 59
Perth–Waterloo boundary	Perth East–Wilmot boundary	60.2	37.4		Regional Road 1 (Wilmot–Easthope Road)	New Hamburg Bypass
Waterloo	Wilmot	62.1	38.6		Regional Road 3 south (Walker Road)	New Hamburg Bypass
Waterloo	Wilmot	63.5	39.5		Regional Road 4 west (Peel Street)	New Hamburg Bypass
Waterloo	Wilmot	64.4	40.0		Regional Road 4 east (Bleams Road)	
Waterloo	Wilmot	65.8	40.9		Regional Road 5 north (Nafziger Road)	
Waterloo	Wilmot	67.2	41.8	Controlled-access highway begins		
Waterloo	Wilmot	68.0	42.3	—	Regional Road 51 (Foundry Street) – Wilmot Centre	
Waterloo	Wilmot	73.1	45.4	—	Regional Road 12 (Queen Street (south) / Notre Dame Drive (north)) – Petersburg	
Waterloo	Kitchener	76.9	47.8	—	Regional Road 70 (Trussler Road) – Mannheim	Kitchener city limits; becomes Conestoga Parkway
Waterloo	Kitchener	80.0	49.7	—	Regional Road 58 (Fischer Hallman Road)	
Waterloo	Kitchener	82.4	51.2	—	Regional Road 28 (Homer Watson Boulevard)	Eastbound entrance via Ottawa Street South
Waterloo	Kitchener	83.7	52.0	—	Regional Road 53 (Courtland Avenue)	
Waterloo	Kitchener	85.1	52.9	—	Highway 8 east (Freeport Diversion) to Highway 401	Eastern end of Highway 8 concurrency; no access from Highway 7 to King Street
Waterloo	Kitchener	86.4	53.7	—	Regional Road 4 (Ottawa Street North)	
Waterloo	Kitchener	88.3	54.9	—	Highway 85 north (Conestoga Parkway) – Waterloo Regional Road 55 west (Victoria Street)	Highway 7 exits Conestoga Parkway at Victoria Street; westbound entrance via Edna Street; eastbound exit via Bruce Street; western end of Regional Road 55 concurrency
Waterloo	Kitchener	90.9	56.5		Regional Road 54 south (Lackner Boulevard) / Bingemans Centre Drive	
Waterloo	Woolwich	94.0	58.4		Regional Road 17 north (Ebycrest Road) / Woolwich Street	
Waterloo	Woolwich	94.4	58.7		Regional Road 17 south (Fountain Street)	
Waterloo	Woolwich	94.7	58.8		Regional Road 55 ends	Eastern end of Regional Road 55 concurrency; Regional Road 55 ends 300 m (980 ft) east of Fountain Street
Waterloo	Woolwich	97.9	60.8		Regional Road 30 (Shantz Station Road)	
Guelph		103.0	64.0		Imperial Road	Beginning of Guelph Connecting Link agreement
Guelph		105.9	65.8		Highway 6 north (Woodlawn Road) – Mount Forest	Northern terminus of Hanlon Expressway; western end of Highway 6 concurrency
Guelph		109.6	68.1	—	Highway 6 south (Hanlon Expressway) to Highway 401 – Hamilton Wellington Street West	Eastern end of Highway 6 concurrency; Highway 7 follows Wellington Street; formerly Highway 24 west; former western end of Highway 24 concurrency; to Regional Road 124 west
Guelph		112.1	69.7		Wyndham Street South / Wellington Street East	Highway 7 follows Wyndham Street South; formerly Highway 24 east; eastern end of former Highway 24 concurrency
Guelph		116.8	72.6			End of Guelph Connecting Link agreement
Wellington	Guelph/Eramosa	120.0	74.6		County Road 29 (Eramosa Road) – Eramosa	
Wellington	Guelph/Eramosa	122.8	76.3		County Road 44 south	
Wellington	Guelph/Eramosa	124.1	77.1		County Road 27 north (Gowan Road)	Rockwood
Wellington	Guelph/Eramosa	125.2	77.8		County Road 50 east	Rockwood
Wellington–Halton boundary	Guelph/Eramosa–Milton boundary	131.3	81.6		Regional Road 32 west (Eramosa-Milton Townline)	
Halton	Halton Hills	134.4	83.5		Regional Road 25 north	Formerly Highway 25 north; western end of former Highway 25 concurrency; beginning of Acton Connecting Link agreement
Halton	Halton Hills	134.9	83.8		Regional Road 25 south – Milton	Formerly Highway 25 south; eastern end of former Highway 25 concurrency
Halton	Halton Hills	136.4	84.8		Churchill Road	End of Acton Connecting Link agreement
Halton	Halton Hills	142.1	88.3		Regional Road 3 north (Trafalgar Road) – Ballinafad	
Halton	Halton Hills	145.6	90.5		Regional Road 3 south (Trafalgar Road) – Oakville	
Halton	Halton Hills	147.0	91.3		Wildwood Road	Beginning of Georgetown Connecting Link agreement
Halton	Halton Hills	152.0	94.4		Hall Road	End of Georgetown Connecting Link agreement
Halton	Halton Hills	153.6	95.4		Regional Road 19 (Winston Churchill Boulevard) – Cheltenham	Norval
Halton–Peel boundary	Halton Hills–Brampton boundary	154.1	95.8		Highway 7 ends Peel Regional Road 107 begins	End of western segment; continues as Regional Road 107 east
Peel	Brampton	156.0	96.9		Highway 413	Future interchange location for future freeway; future end of western segment
Peel	Brampton	162.5	101.0		Hurontario Street / Main Street	Formerly Highway 10
Peel	Brampton	165.3	102.7	13	Highway 410 north Regional Road 10 east (Bovaird Drive)	Former west end of Highway 410 concurrency; exit numbers follow Highway 410; Regional Roads are unsigned on Highway 410
Peel	Brampton	166.8	103.6	12	Williams Parkway	
Peel	Brampton	168.3	104.6	10	Regional Road 6 west (Queen Street) Highway 410 south	Former east end of Highway 410 concurrency; Regional Roads are unsigned on Highway 410
Peel–York boundary	Brampton–Vaughan boundary	178.5	110.9		Peel Regional Road 50 / York Regional Road 24 Peel Regional Road 107 ends York Regional Road 7 begins	Formerly Highway 50; York Regional Road 24 is unsigned
York	Vaughan	179.7	111.7		Highway 427	Highway 427 exit 21
York	Vaughan	180.8	112.3		Regional Road 27	Formerly Highway 27
York	Vaughan	187.7	116.6		Highway 400	Highway 400 exit 29; no access to Highway 407 from Regional Road 7
York	Richmond Hill	198.7	123.5		Regional Road 1 (Yonge Street)	Formerly Highway 11
York	Richmond Hill–Markham boundary	203.5	126.4		Highway 404	Highway 404 exit 26; no access to Highway 407 from Regional Road 7
York	Markham	212.8	132.2		Regional Road 68 (Markham Road)	Formerly Highway 48
York	Markham	216.5	134.5		Regional Road 48 (Donald Cousins Parkway)	
York	Markham	216.7	134.7		Highway 7 begins York Regional Road 7 ends	Beginning of eastern segment lies 185 m (605 ft) east of Reesor Road
York–Durham boundary	Markham–Pickering boundary	219.6	136.5		York Regional Road 30 (York–Durham Line)	
Durham	Pickering				Regional Road 40 south (Whites Road)	
Durham	Pickering	226.5	140.7		Regional Road 1 (Brock Road) – Brougham, Uxbridge	
Durham	Pickering	227.3	141.2		Highway 407 west – Markham	Highway 7 passes over former eastern terminus of Highway 407
Durham	Whitby	235.2	146.1		Highway 412 south	Southbound entrance and northbound exit
Durham	Whitby	239.1	148.6		Highway 12 south (Baldwin Street) Regional Road 3 east (Winchester Road)	Western end of Highway 12 concurrency
Durham	Whitby	243.2	151.1		Regional Road 26 south (Thickson Road)	
Durham	Scugog	253.3	157.4		Highway 7A east – Port Perry, Peterborough; Regional Road 21 west (Goodwood Road)	Manchester; Highway 7A provides a shorter route to Peterborough via Highway 115
Durham	Scugog	256.2	159.2		Regional Road 8 (Reach Street) – Uxbridge, Port Perry	
Durham	Scugog	260.4	161.8		Regional Highway 47 west – Uxbridge, Stouffville	
Durham	Scugog	266.2	165.4		Regional Road 6 east (Saintfield Road) – Seagrave	Saintfield
Durham	Brock	270.6	168.1		Regional Road 13	Blackwater
Durham	Brock	275.4	171.1		Regional Road 10 west (River Street)	Sunderland
Durham	Brock	278.2	172.9		Highway 12 north / TCH – Beaverton, Orillia	Eastern end of Highway 12 concurrency; western end of Trans-Canada Highway (continues on Highway 12 north)
Durham–Kawartha Lakes boundary	Manilla	285.2	177.2		Durham Regional Road 2 / Kawartha Lakes Road 2 (Simcoe Street)	Manilla
Kawartha Lakes		288.3	179.1		Road 46 north – Woodville; Fingerboard Road south	Formerly Highway 46 north
Kawartha Lakes	Oakwood	294.5	183.0		Road 6 (Eldon Road) – Little Britain, Kirkfield	
Kawartha Lakes	Lindsay	303.2	188.4		Highway 35 north (Kent Street West) – Lindsay, Fenelon Falls	Western end of Highway 35 concurrency and Lindsay Bypass; formerly Highway 7B east
Kawartha Lakes	Lindsay	307.3	190.9		Road 4 (Angeline Street South / Little Britain Road) – Little Britain	
Kawartha Lakes	Lindsay	308.7	191.8		Highway 35 south – Newcastle; Road 15 north (Lindsay Street)	Eastern end of Highway 35 concurrency and Lindsay Bypass; formerly Highway 7B west / Highway 35B north
Kawartha Lakes	Lindsay	310.2	192.7		Road 36 north – Bobcaygeon	Formerly Highway 36 north
Kawartha Lakes		322.5	200.4		Road 31 west (Mount Horeb Road)	
Kawartha Lakes	Omemee	323.4	201.0		Sibley Avenue	Beginning of Omemee Connecting Link agreement
Kawartha Lakes	Omemee	323.9	201.3		Road 38 south (Ski Hill Road)	
Kawartha Lakes	Omemee	324.7	201.8		Road 7 north (Sturgeon Road)	
Kawartha Lakes	Omemee	326.1	202.6			End of Omemee Connecting Link agreement
Kawartha Lakes		328.2	203.9		Road 10 (Emily Park Road)	
Kawartha Lakes–Peterborough boundary	Fowlers Corners	334.8	208.0		Kawartha Lakes Road 26 north (Frank Hill Road) Peterborough County Road 1 east (Lindsay Road)	Formerly Highway 7B east
Peterborough	Selwyn–Cavan Monaghan boundary	339.1	210.7		County Road 3 east (Park Hill Road West)	
Peterborough	Cavan Monaghan	340.4	211.5		County Road 9 (Sherbrook Street West / Mount Pleasant Road)	
Peterborough	Cavan Monaghan	342.2	212.6		County Road 5 east (Lansdowne Street)	
Peterborough	Cavan Monaghan	343.6	213.5		County Road 15 east (Monaghan Parkway)	Formerly Highway 7 east; Highway 7 follows former Highway 7A
Peterborough	Cavan Monaghan	347.2	215.7	45	Highway 115 south – Toronto County Road 28 – Port Hope	Western end of Highway 115 concurrency; exit numbers follow Highway 115; formerly Highway 28 south
Peterborough	Cavan Monaghan	351.2	218.2	49	County Road 11 (Airport Road)	To Peterborough Airport
Peterborough		353.6	219.7	51	The Parkway, Sir Sandford Fleming Drive	Formerly Highway 28 north / Highway 7 west
Peterborough		356.9	221.8	54	Bensfort Road	Access to and from westbound Highway 7/115 via Kennedy Road; no access to eastbound Highway 7/115
Peterborough		358.5	222.8	56	Ashburnham Drive	Access to and from eastbound Highway 7/115 via Neal Drive
Peterborough		359.9	223.6		Highway 115 ends Lansdowne Street East / Television Road	Eastern end of freeway and Highway 115 concurrency; signalized intersection; formerly Highway 7B west
Peterborough		360.4	223.9		County Road 35 south (Keene Road)	
Peterborough	Otonabee–South Monaghan	367.2	228.2		Highway 28 north – Lakefield, Bancroft; County Road 34 south (Heritage Line)	Formerly Highway 134 north
Peterborough	Asphodel–Norwood	377.0	234.3		County Road 38	
Peterborough	Asphodel–Norwood	386.8	240.3		County Road 40 north County Road 45 south	Norwood; formerly Highway 45 south
Peterborough	Havelock-Belmont-Methuen	395.9	246.0		Canadian Pacific Railway crossing	Beginning of Havelock Connecting Link agreement
Peterborough	Havelock-Belmont-Methuen	396.1	246.1		County Road 30 (Concession Street)	
Peterborough	Havelock-Belmont-Methuen	397.7	247.1		County Road 48 east / Mary Street	End of Havelock Connecting Link agreement
Peterborough	Havelock-Belmont-Methuen	402.3	250.0		County Road 50 south	Preneveau
Hastings	Marmora and Lake	414.0	257.2		Crowe River	Beginning of Marmora Connecting Link agreement
Hastings	Marmora and Lake	414.1	257.3		County Road 14 south (Forsyth Street)	Formerly Highway 14 south
Hastings	Marmora and Lake	415.3	258.1		Maloney Street	End of Marmora Connecting Link agreement
Hastings	Marmora and Lake	418.6	260.1		County Road 11 north (Deloro Road)	
Hastings	Madoc (township)	429.3	266.8		County Road 23 east (St. Lawrence Street)	Formerly Highway 7B east
Hastings	Centre Hastings (Madoc (village))	431.6	268.2		Highway 62 – Belleville, Bancroft	
Hastings	Centre Hastings (Madoc (village))	432.5	268.7		County Road 12 north (Cooper Road)	
Hastings	Madoc (township)	434.4	269.9		County Road 23 west (St. Lawrence Street)	Formerly Highway 7B west
Hastings	Tweed	442.2	274.8		County Road 20 north (Queensborough Road)	
Hastings	Tweed	445.1	276.6		Highway 37 south – Belleville, Tweed (village)	Actinolite
Hastings	Tweed	445.8	277.0		County Road 25 north (Flinton Road)	
Lennox and Addington	Addington Highlands	467.1	290.2		Highway 41 north – Denbigh; County Road 41 south	Kaladar
Frontenac	Central Frontenac	507.2	315.2		Township Road 509 north – Plevna	Formerly Highway 509 north
Frontenac	Central Frontenac	508.5	316.0		Township Road 38 south – Sharbot Lake, Kingston	Formerly Highway 38 south
Lanark	Tay Valley	519.8	323.0		County Road 36 (Bolingbroke Road south / Elphin Road north)	Maberly
Lanark	Perth	542.5	337.1		County Road 511 north – Lanark	Formerly Highway 511 north
Lanark	Perth	543.2	337.5		County Road 43 south (Wilson Street) – Smiths Falls	Formerly Highway 43 south
Lanark	Lanark Highlands	564.0	350.5		County Road 15 north (Ferguson Falls Road) – Lanark	
Lanark	Mississippi Mills	564.0	350.5		County Road 9 north (Tatlock Road)	
Lanark	Mississippi Mills–Beckwith boundary	573.0	356.0		County Road 7B (Townline Road) – Carleton Place	Formerly Highway 7B east
Lanark	Carleton Place	576.8	358.4		Highway 15 south – Smiths Falls, Kingston	
Lanark	Carleton Place	577.4	358.8		County Road 29 north (McNeely Avenue) – Arnprior	Formerly Highway 15 north
Lanark	Carleton Place	Beginning of controlled-access highway				
Lanark	Beckwith	581.7	361.5	—	County Road 17 (Appleton Sideroad north / Cemetery Sideroad south)	
Lanark County–Ottawa boundary	Beckwith–Ottawa boundary	584.4	363.1	—	Ashton Station Road	
Ottawa
Ottawa		595.8	370.2	—	Road 36 (Hazeldean Road) – Ottawa	
Ottawa		598.3	371.8	—	Highway 417 / TCH – Arnprior, Pembroke, Ottawa	Highway 7 eastern terminus; Highway 417 exit 145
1.000 mi = 1.609 km; 1.000 km = 0.621 mi: Closed/former; Concurrency terminus; Incomplete access; Route transition; Unopened

Trans-Canada Highway
Previous route Highway 12	Highway 7	Next route Highway 417
