= Scugog Centre =

Coordinates: 44.156°N 78.898°W

Location of Scugog Centre in Ontario

Scugog Centre is a community in the township of Scugog, Ontario.

Located on the shores of Lake Scugog's east side (opposite Scugog Island centred at Island Road (Regional Road 7) and Demara Road) just east of Lakeside Beach. The area is mainly agricultural with few homes, with more residential areas along the lake. At the intersection of Island Road, Demara Road and Stephenson Point Road are a few historic structures:

- Scugog Island Hall (banquet facility built in 1884)
- Scugog Island United Church and Manse (built 1868)
- Scugog Island Centre School (built 1865)
