= Bethany, Ontario =

Unincorporated village in Ontario, Canada

Coordinates: 44°11′N 78°34′W

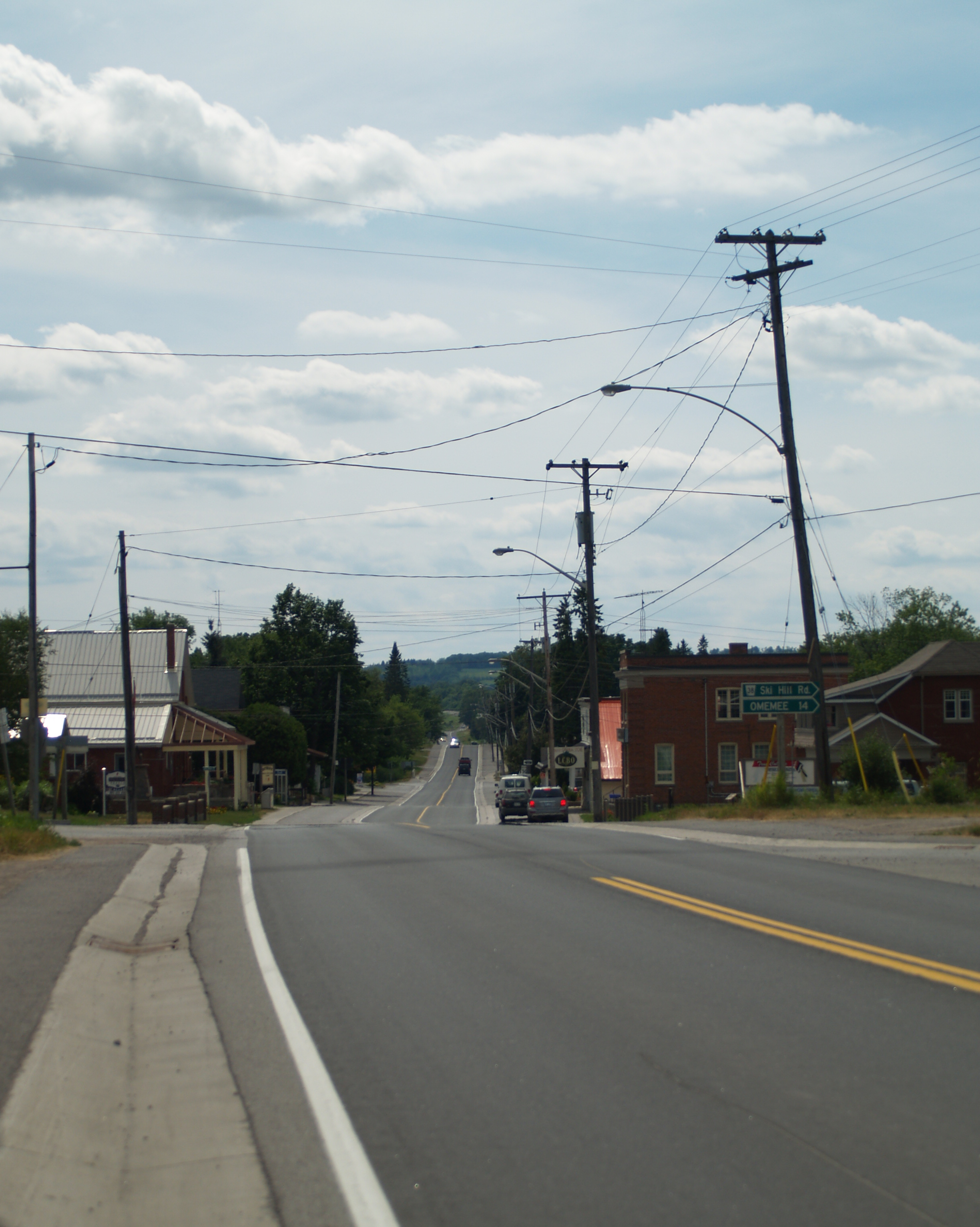
Bethany, Ontario

Bethany is an unincorporated village in the Canadian province of Ontario, within the single-tier municipality of Kawartha Lakes. Bethany is centred on Highway 7A. It is located 27 kilometers west of Peterborough, the largest city in the area.

It is a gateway community, where since 2000 there has been significant real-estate development, mostly in the form of individual dwellings. To the north are downhill and cross-country ski areas, mostly accessible by paved county roads.

== History ==
By 1869, Bethany was a village with a population of 300 in the Township of Manvers, then part of Durham County. It was a station of the Port Hope, Lindsay and Beaverton Railway. Since a stream passing through the village afforded power for machinery, it was a good position for a foundry, agricultural implement works and a tannery. The average cost of improved lands was $35 per acre while wild lands were valued at $23.

== Services ==
=== Library ===
Bethany Public Library is part of the City of Kawartha Lakes Public Library System, which offers computer access as well as ongoing free programs. The library is in the same building as the municipal offices.

=== Sub post office ===
Bethany sub post office, part of Canada Post, offers post office boxes in the IDA Drug Mart

=== Schools ===
Most Bethany students attend schools which are part of the Trillium Lakelands District School Board. Most students in grades Junior Kindergarten to 3 attend Grandview Public School. Students in Grades 4 - 8 attend Rolling Hills Public School. Highschool students are bussed to I.E.Weldon Secondary School.

== Celebrations ==
The town has annual celebrations throughout the summer, particularly on the May 24 Victoria Day long-weekend. Put on by the Bethany Athletic Society, responsible for maintaining the community park, and youth sports. Highlights of the Victoria Day weekend include the Classic Car show ^{(started in 1990)}, Tractor pulls ^{(started in 2005)}, Fireworks, Beef BBQ and the all ages Dances.
