= Blackstock, Ontario =

Blackstock
- Unincorporated community
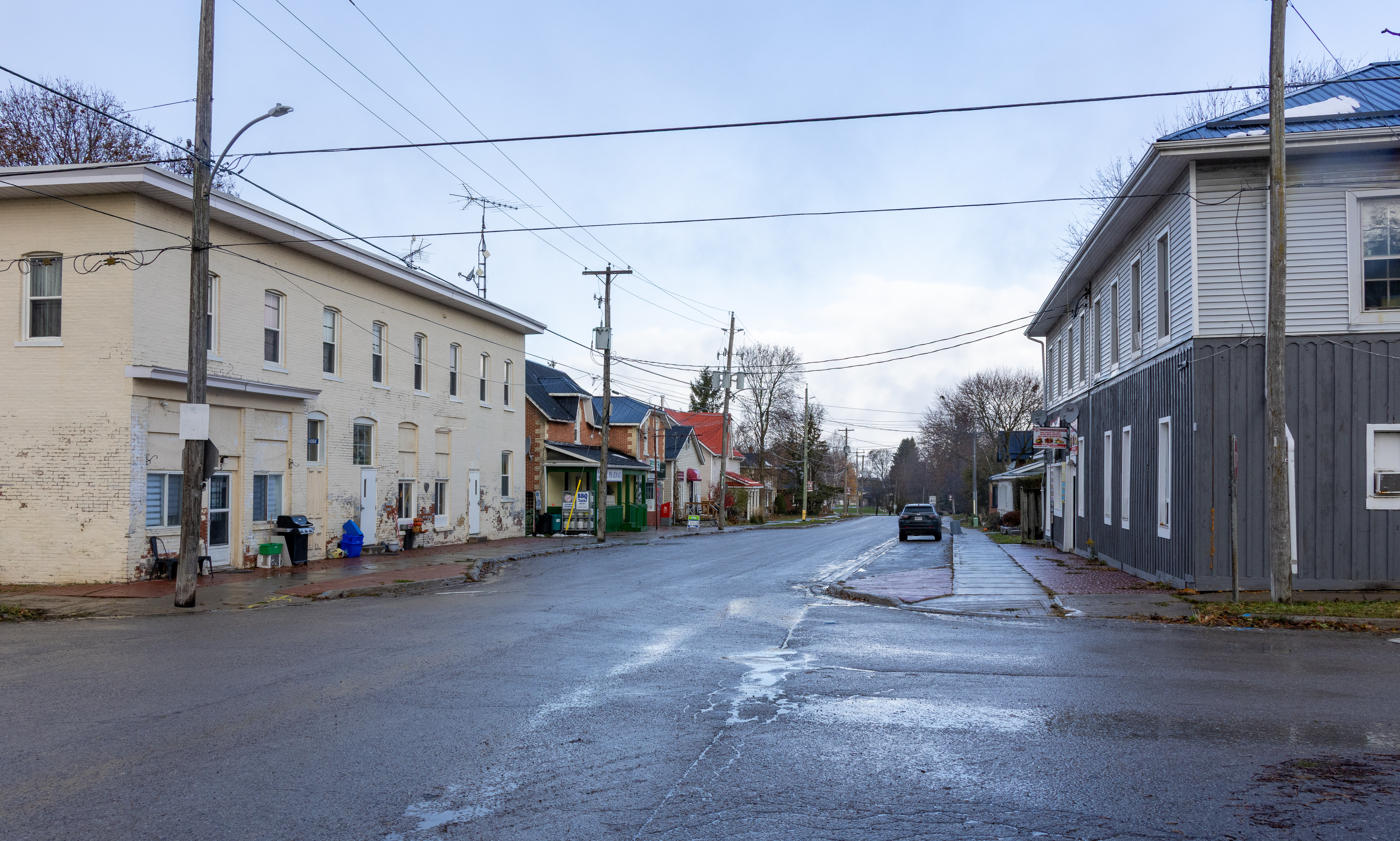
- Old Scugog Road, Blackstock
- Interactive map of Blackstock
- Coordinates: 44°06′34″N 78°49′18″W
- Country: Canada
- Province: Ontario
- Regional municipality: Durham
- Municipality: Scugog
- Established: 1851
- Time zone: UTC-5 (EST)
  - Summer (DST): UTC-4 (EDT)
- Forward sortation area: 1B0
- Area codes: 905 and 289

Blackstock is an unincorporated community in Ontario, Canada. It is recognized as a designated place by Statistics Canada.

== Demographics ==
In the 2021 Census of Population conducted by Statistics Canada, Blackstock had a population of 786 living in 273 of its 284 total private dwellings, a change of 0.6% from its 2016 population of 781. With a land area of 0.9 km^{2} (0.35 sq mi), it had a population density of 873.3/km^{2} (2,261.9/sq mi) in 2021.

== See also ==
- List of communities in Ontario
- List of designated places in Ontario
