= Utica, Ontario =

Unincorporated community in Ontario, Canada

Coordinates: 44.068471°N 79.025886°W

Utica is an unincorporated community in Ontario, Canada. It is recognized as a designated place by Statistics Canada.

== Demographics ==
In the 2021 Census of Population conducted by Statistics Canada, Utica had a population of 121 living in 41 of its 42 total private dwellings, a change of 7.1% from its 2016 population of 113. With a land area of 0.45 km^{2} (0.17 sq mi), it had a population density of 268.9/km^{2} (696.4/sq mi) in 2021.

== See also ==
- List of communities in Ontario
- List of designated places in Ontario
