= Epsom, Ontario =

Unincorporated community in Ontario, Canada

Coordinates: 44.093542°N 79.036353°W

Epsom is an unincorporated community in Ontario, Canada. It is recognized as a designated place by Statistics Canada.

== Demographics ==
In the 2021 Census of Population conducted by Statistics Canada, Epsom had a population of 181 living in 58 of its 60 total private dwellings, a change of 2.3% from its 2016 population of 177. With a land area of 0.48 km^{2} (0.19 sq mi), it had a population density of 377.1/km^{2} (976.6/sq mi) in 2021.

== See also ==
- List of communities in Ontario
- List of designated places in Ontario
