= Manilla, Ontario =

Unincorporated community in Ontario, Canada

Coordinates: 44.308074°N 78.990734°W

Simcoe Street through Manilla in 2026

Manilla is an unincorporated community in Ontario, Canada. It is recognized as a designated place by Statistics Canada.

== Demographics ==
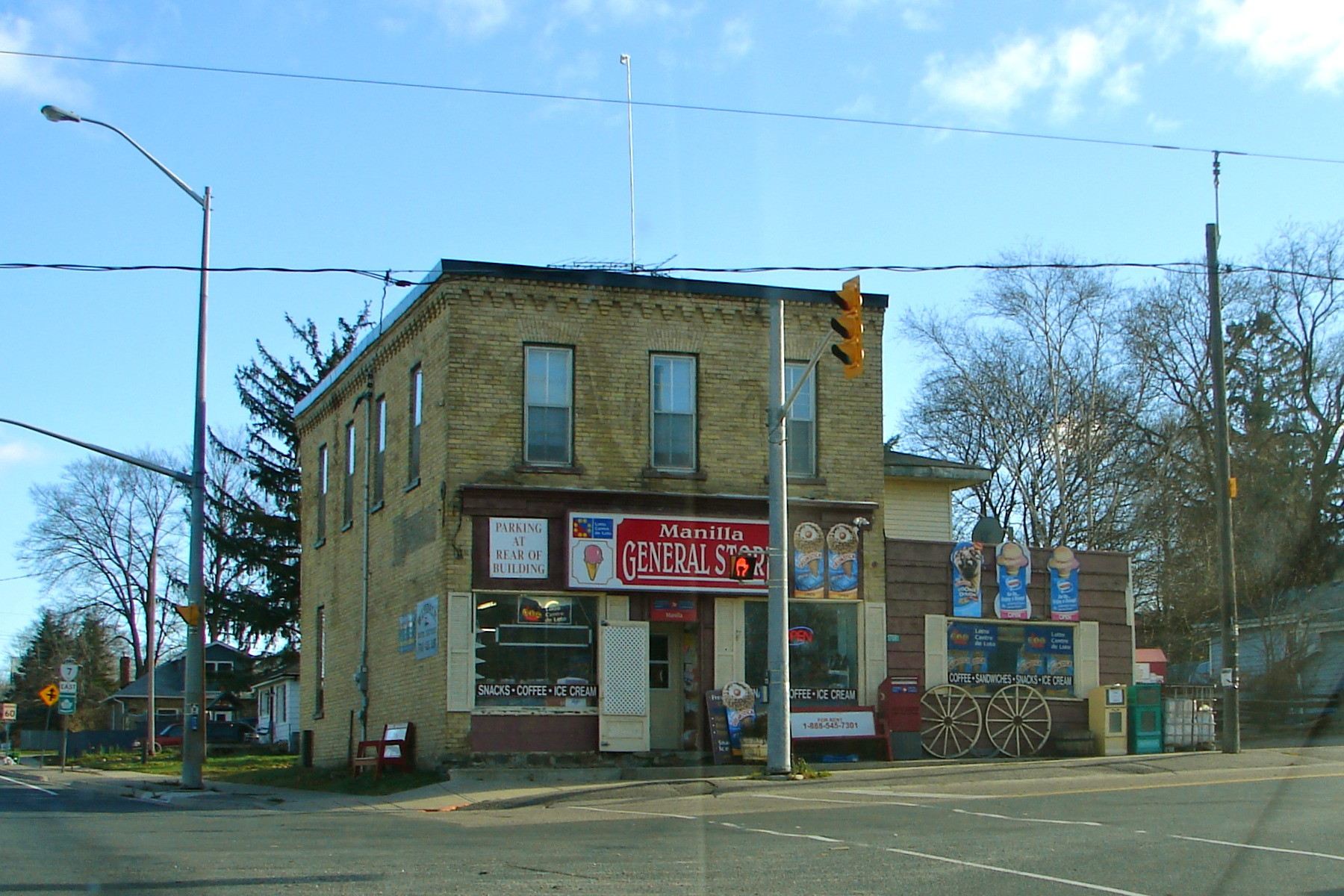
General store in Manila in 2012

In the 2021 Census of Population conducted by Statistics Canada, Manilla had a population of 102 living in 35 of its 38 total private dwellings, a change of 34.2% from its 2016 population of 76. With a land area of 0.27 km^{2} (0.10 sq mi), it had a population density of 377.8/km^{2} (978.4/sq mi) in 2021.

== See also ==
- List of communities in Ontario
- List of designated places in Ontario
