= Nestleton Station, Ontario =

Unincorporated community in Ontario, Canada

Coordinates: 44.140159°N 78.793657°W

Nestleton Station is an unincorporated community in Ontario, Canada. It is recognized as a designated place by Statistics Canada.

== Demographics ==
In the 2021 Census of Population conducted by Statistics Canada, Nestleton Station had a population of 211 living in 81 of its 85 total private dwellings, a change of -2.8% from its 2016 population of 217. With a land area of 0.91 km^{2} (0.35 sq mi), it had a population density of 231.9/km^{2} (600.5/sq mi) in 2021.

== See also ==
- List of communities in Ontario
- List of designated places in Ontario
