= Caesarea, Ontario =

Unincorporated community in Ontario, Canada

Coordinates: 44.158248°N 78.832044°W

Caesarea is an unincorporated community in Ontario, Canada. It is recognized as a designated place by Statistics Canada.

== History ==
Caesarea was named after a local landowner after originally being named Lasherville. The community's post office was opened in 1951.

== Demographics ==
In the 2021 Census of Population conducted by Statistics Canada, Caesarea had a population of 816 living in 339 of its 401 total private dwellings, a change of -0.9% from its 2016 population of 823. With a land area of 0.85 km^{2} (0.33 sq mi), it had a population density of 960.0/km^{2} (2,486.4/sq mi) in 2021.

== See also ==
- List of communities in Ontario
- List of designated places in Ontario
