= Great Blue Heron Casino =

- Interactive map of Great Blue Heron Casino
- Location: Port Perry, Ontario, Canada; 44.181111°N 78.888992°W
- Opened: 1997
- Casino type: Land-based
- Owner: The Great Blue Heron Gaming Company
- Renovated in: 1999–2000, 2018-2021
- Website: gbhcasino.com

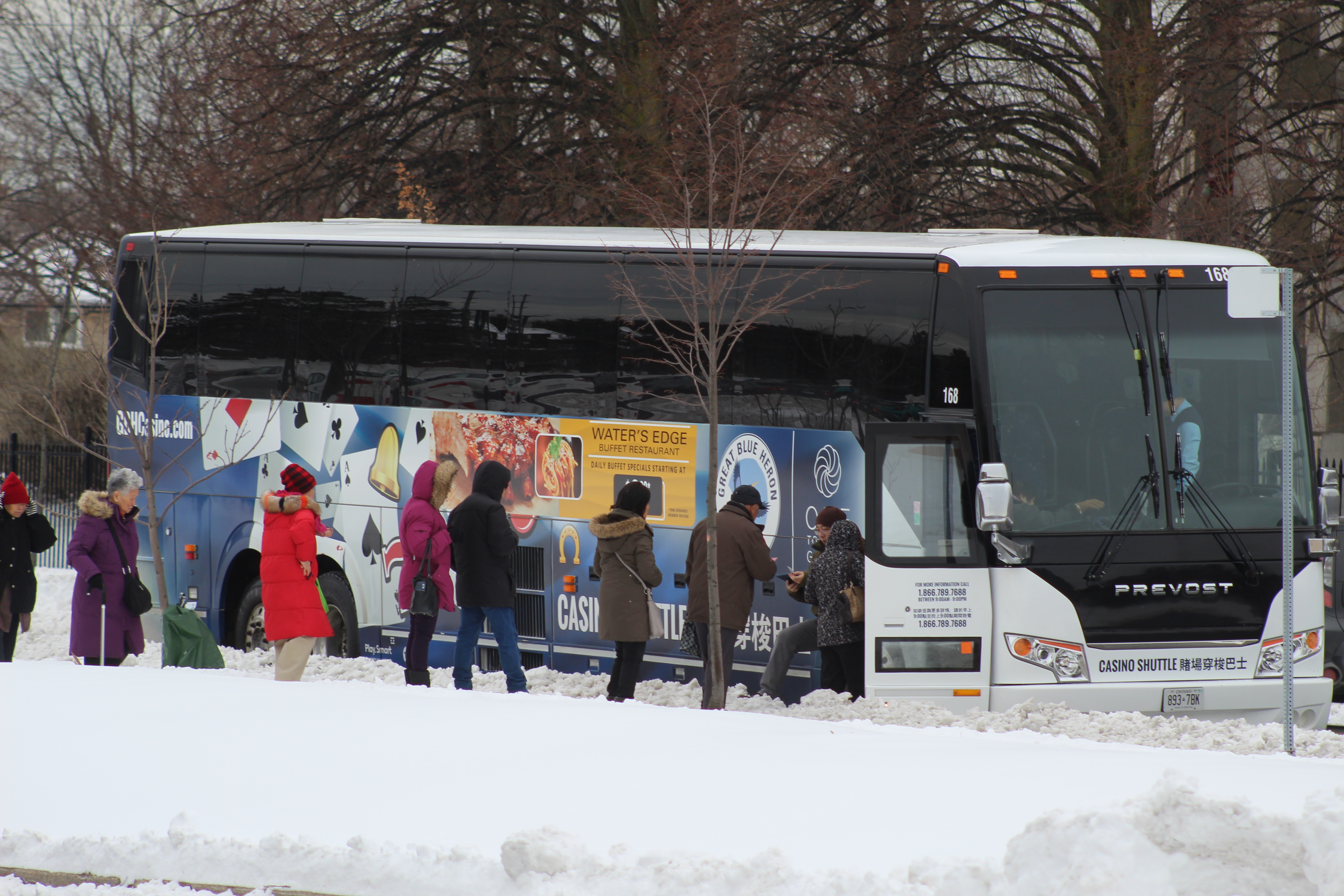
People getting on a shuttle bus at Woodside Square to the casino.

The Great Blue Heron Casino is located on Scugog Island, just east of the community of Port Perry, Ontario, and northeast of Toronto. Both the Casino and the land on which it is built are owned by the Mississaugas of Scugog Island First Nation. The First Nation theme is carried throughout the facility, in the interior art and is especially noticeable in the signature red, blue and cream colour roof.

The Great Blue Heron Gaming Company, a partnership of Casinos Austria, the Steiner Family, and Sonco Gaming, operates the Casino. The Ontario Lottery and Gaming Corporation manages the slots, while the Baagwating Community Association, a non-profit, charitable organization formed by the Mississaugas of Scugog Island First Nation, manages the table games. Revenues and profits are distributed among the parties, and to various charitable organizations, based upon contractual sharing arrangements.

Opened originally in 1997, with gaming tables and a 650-seat bingo hall, the Casino was extensively renovated in 1999 and 2000. Its floor area is approximately 25,000 square feet (2,300 m^{2}), in which there are now two bars, one restaurant, a slots' room with 545 machines and a 60 table games. The table games include: Roulette, Blackjack, Spanish 21, Mini Baccarat, Let it Ride Poker, Texas Hold Em Poker, Pai Gow Poker, Three & Four Card Poker and Texas Hold Em Bonus Poker. As of 1999, there is no longer a bingo hall on premises.

On November 1, 2021, The Great Blue Heron Casino announced the completion of their renovation and hotel, which was announced on January 9, 2018. The renovation was delayed multiple times due to the ongoing COVID-19 pandemic. The renovation consists of a 100 room hotel and a 20,000 foot addition to the casino.

== See also ==
- List of casinos in Canada
