= Seagrave, Ontario =

Unincorporated community in Ontario, Canada

Coordinates: 44.200190°N 78.951655°W

Seagrave is an unincorporated community in Ontario, Canada. It is recognized as a designated place by Statistics Canada.

== Demographics ==
In the 2021 Census of Population conducted by Statistics Canada, Seagrave had a population of 396 living in 136 of its 141 total private dwellings, a change of -13.5% from its 2016 population of 458. With a land area of 1.13 km^{2} (0.44 sq mi), it had a population density of 350.4/km^{2} (907.6/sq mi) in 2021.

== See also ==
- List of communities in Ontario
- List of designated places in Ontario
