= Manchester, Ontario =

Unincorporated community in Ontario, Canada

Coordinates: 44.077913°N 78.982669°W

Manchester is an unincorporated community in Ontario, Canada. It is recognized as a designated place by Statistics Canada.

== Demographics ==
In the 2021 Census of Population conducted by Statistics Canada, Manchester had a population of 111 living in 40 of its 42 total private dwellings, a change of 12.1% from its 2016 population of 99. With a land area of 0.48 km^{2} (0.19 sq mi), it had a population density of 231.3/km^{2} (598.9/sq mi) in 2021.

== See also ==
- List of communities in Ontario
- List of designated places in Ontario
