= List of members of the Canadian House of Commons (G) =

== Gaf–Gan ==
- Beryl Gaffney b. 1930 first elected in 1988 as Liberal member for Nepean, Ontario.
- Alfonso Gagliano b. 1942 first elected in 1984 as Liberal member for Saint-Léonard—Anjou, Quebec.
- Jean Alfred Gagné b. 1842 first elected in 1882 as Conservative member for Chicoutimi—Saguenay, Quebec.
- Christiane Gagnon b. 1948 first elected in 1993 as Bloc Québécois member for Québec, Quebec.
- Marcel Gagnon b. 1936 first elected in 2000 as Bloc Québécois member for Champlain, Quebec.
- Onésime Gagnon b. 1888 first elected in 1930 as Conservative member for Dorchester, Quebec.
- Patrick Gagnon b. 1962 first elected in 1993 as Liberal member for Bonaventure—Îles-de-la-Madeleine, Quebec.
- Paul Gagnon b. 1937 first elected in 1984 as Progressive Conservative member for Calgary North, Alberta.
- Paul-Edmond Gagnon b. 1909 first elected in 1945 as Independent member for Chicoutimi, Quebec.
- Philippe Gagnon b. 1909 first elected in 1962 as Social Credit member for Rivière-du-Loup—Témiscouata, Quebec.
- Sébastien Gagnon b. 1973 first elected in 2002 as Bloc Québécois member for Lac-Saint-Jean—Saguenay, Quebec.
- Iqwinder Gaheer b. 1993 first elected in 2021 as Liberal member for Mississauga—Malton, Ontario.
- Anna Gainey b. 1978 first elected in 2023 as Liberal member for Notre-Dame-de-Grâce—Westmount, Quebec.
- Daniel Galbraith b. 1813 first elected in 1872 as Liberal member for Lanark North, Ontario.
- Royal Galipeau b. 1947 first elected in 2006 as Conservative member for Ottawa—Orléans, Ontario.
- Cheryl Gallant b. 1960 first elected in 2000 as Canadian Alliance member for Renfrew—Nipissing—Pembroke, Ontario.
- Roger Gallaway b. 1948 first elected in 1993 as Liberal member for Sarnia—Lambton, Ontario.
- Daniel Gallery b. 1859 first elected in 1900 as Liberal member for St. Anne, Quebec.
- William Alfred Galliher b. 1860 first elected in 1900 as Liberal member for Yale—Cariboo, British Columbia.
- Alexander Tilloch Galt b. 1817 first elected in 1867 as Liberal-Conservative member for Town of Sherbrooke, Quebec.
- John Albert Gamble b. 1933 first elected in 1979 as Progressive Conservative member for York North, Ontario.
- Arthur D. Ganong b. 1877 first elected in 1930 as Conservative member for Charlotte, New Brunswick.
- Gilbert White Ganong b. 1851 first elected in 1896 as Liberal-Conservative member for Charlotte, New Brunswick.

== Gar–Gaz ==
- Alain Garant b. 1952 first elected in 1980 as Liberal member for Bellechasse, Quebec.
- Brian L. Gardiner b. 1955 first elected in 1988 as New Democratic Party member for Prince George—Bulkley Valley, British Columbia.
- James Garfield Gardiner b. 1883 first elected in 1936 as Liberal member for Assiniboia, Saskatchewan.
- Robert Gardiner b. 1879 first elected in 1921 as Progressive member for Medicine Hat, Alberta.
- Wilfrid Gariépy b. 1877 first elected in 1935 as Liberal member for Three Rivers, Quebec.
- Edward Joseph Garland b. 1885 first elected in 1921 as Progressive member for Bow River, Alberta.
- Jack Garland b. 1918 first elected in 1949 as Liberal member for Nipissing, Ontario.
- William Foster Garland b. 1875 first elected in 1912 as Conservative member for Carleton, Ontario.
- Marc Garneau b. 1949 first elected in 2008 as Liberal member for Westmount—Ville-Marie, Quebec.
- Raymond Garneau b. 1935 first elected in 1984 as Liberal member for Laval-des-Rapides, Quebec.
- Jean-Denis Garon b. 1982 first elected in 2021 as Bloc Québécois member for Mirabel, Quebec.
- Randall Garrison b. 1951 first elected in 2011 as New Democratic Party member for Esquimalt—Juan de Fuca, British Columbia.
- Stuart Garson b. 1898 first elected in 1948 as Liberal member for Marquette, Manitoba.
- Vince Gasparro first elected in 2025 as Liberal member for Eglinton—Lawrence, Ontario.
- Melbourne Gass b. 1938 first elected in 1979 as Progressive Conservative member for Malpeque, Prince Edward Island.
- Guillaume Gamelin Gaucher b. 1810 first elected in 1867 as Conservative member for Jacques Cartier, Quebec.
- Athanase Gaudet b. 1848 first elected in 1884 as Nationalist Conservative member for Nicolet, Quebec.
- Joseph Gaudet b. 1818 first elected in 1867 as Conservative member for Nicolet, Quebec.
- Roger Gaudet b. 1945 first elected in 2002 as Bloc Québécois member for Berthier—Montcalm, Quebec.
- Marie-Hélène Gaudreau b. 1977 first elected in 2019 as Bloc Québécois member for Laurentides—Labelle, Quebec.
- Matthew Hamilton Gault b. 1822 first elected in 1878 as Conservative member for Montreal West, Quebec.
- André Gauthier b. 1915 first elected in 1949 as Liberal member for Lac-Saint-Jean, Quebec.
- Charles-Arthur Gauthier b. 1913 first elected in 1962 as Social Credit member for Roberval, Quebec.
- Jean-Robert Gauthier b. 1929 first elected in 1972 as Liberal member for Ottawa East, Ontario.
- Joseph Gauthier b. 1842 first elected in 1887 as Liberal member for L'Assomption, Quebec.
- Jules Gauthier b. 1892 first elected in 1949 as Liberal member for Lapointe, Quebec.
- Léo Gauthier b. 1904 first elected in 1945 as Liberal member for Nipissing, Ontario.
- Louis Joseph Gauthier b. 1866 first elected in 1911 as Liberal member for St. Hyacinthe, Quebec.
- Louis-Philippe Gauthier b. 1876 first elected in 1911 as Conservative member for Gaspé, Quebec.
- Michel Gauthier b. 1950 first elected in 1993 as Bloc Québécois member for Roberval, Quebec.
- Pierre Gauthier b. 1894 first elected in 1936 as Liberal member for Portneuf, Quebec.
- Rosaire Gauthier b. 1908 first elected in 1957 as Liberal member for Chicoutimi, Quebec.
- Charles Arthur Gauvreau b. 1860 first elected in 1897 as Liberal member for Témiscouata, Quebec.
- Leah Gazan b. 1972 first elected in 2019 as New Democratic Party member for Winnipeg Centre, Manitoba.

== Ge ==
- George Reginald Geary b. 1873 first elected in 1925 as Conservative member for Toronto South, Ontario.
- Marvin Gelber b. 1912 first elected in 1963 as Liberal member for York South, Ontario.
- Pierre Samuel Gendron b. 1828 first elected in 1867 as Conservative member for Bagot, Quebec.
- Romuald Gendron b. 1865 first elected in 1921 as Liberal member for Wright, Quebec.
- Rosaire Gendron b. 1920 first elected in 1963 as Liberal member for Rivière-du-Loup—Témiscouata, Quebec.
- Bernard Généreux b. 1962 first elected in 2009 as Conservative member for Montmagny—L'Islet—Kamouraska—Rivière-du-Loup, Quebec.
- Réjean Genest b. 1946 first elected in 2011 as New Democratic Party member for Shefford, Quebec.
- Jonathan Genest-Jourdain b. 1979 first elected in 2011 as New Democratic Party member for Manicouagan, Quebec.
- Garnett Genuis b. 1987 first elected in 2015 as Conservative member for Sherwood Park—Fort Saskatchewan, Alberta.
- Christophe Alphonse Geoffrion b. 1843 first elected in 1895 as Liberal member for Verchères, Quebec.
- Félix Geoffrion b. 1832 first elected in 1867 as Liberal member for Verchères, Quebec.
- Victor Geoffrion b. 1851 first elected in 1900 as Liberal member for Chambly—Verchères, Quebec.
- Edmund William George b. 1908 first elected in 1949 as Liberal member for Westmorland, New Brunswick.
- François Gérin b. 1944 first elected in 1984 as Progressive Conservative member for Mégantic—Compton—Stanstead, Quebec.
- Bud Germa b. 1920 first elected in 1967 as New Democratic Party member for Sudbury, Ontario.
- William Manly German b. 1851 first elected in 1891 as Liberal member for Welland, Ontario.
- Jon Gerrard b. 1947 first elected in 1993 as Liberal member for Portage—Interlake, Manitoba.
- Mark Gerretsen b. 1975 first elected in 2015 as Liberal member for Kingston and the Islands, Ontario.
- Frederick William Gershaw b. 1883 first elected in 1925 as Liberal member for Medicine Hat, Alberta.
- Aurèle Gervais b. 1933 first elected in 1984 as Progressive Conservative member for Timmins—Chapleau, Ontario.
- Honoré Hippolyte Achille Gervais b. 1864 first elected in 1904 as Liberal member for St. James, Quebec.
- Joseph-Charles-Théodore Gervais b. 1868 first elected in 1917 as Laurier Liberal member for Berthier, Quebec.
- Paul Mullins Gervais b. 1925 first elected in 1968 as Liberal member for Sherbrooke, Quebec.

== Gib–Gil ==
- Thomas Nicholson Gibbs b. 1821 first elected in 1867 as Liberal-Conservative member for Ontario South, Ontario.
- William Henry Gibbs b. 1823 first elected in 1872 as Conservative member for Ontario North, Ontario.
- Marie Gibeau b. 1950 first elected in 1988 as Progressive Conservative member for Bourassa, Quebec.
- Alexander Gibson b. 1852 first elected in 1900 as Liberal member for York, New Brunswick.
- Colin David Gibson b. 1922 first elected in 1968 as Liberal member for Hamilton—Wentworth, Ontario.
- Colin William George Gibson b. 1891 first elected in 1940 as Liberal member for Hamilton West, Ontario.
- John Lambert Gibson b. 1906 first elected in 1945 as Independent Liberal member for Comox—Alberni, British Columbia.
- William Gibson b. 1815 first elected in 1872 as Independent Liberal member for Dundas, Ontario.
- William Gibson b. 1849 first elected in 1891 as Liberal member for Lincoln and Niagara, Ontario.
- Georges Auguste Gigault b. 1845 first elected in 1878 as Conservative member for Rouville, Quebec.
- Alain Giguère b. 1958 first elected in 2011 as New Democratic Party member for Marc-Aurèle-Fortin, Quebec.
- Arthur Gilbert b. 1879 first elected in 1910 as Nationalist member for Drummond—Arthabaska, Quebec.
- John Gilbert b. 1921 first elected in 1965 as New Democratic Party member for Broadview, Ontario.
- James Gordon Gilchrist b. 1928 first elected in 1979 as Progressive Conservative member for Scarborough East, Ontario.
- Amanpreet Gill first elected in 2025 as Conservative member for Calgary Skyview, Alberta.
- Amarjeet Gill first elected in 2025 as Conservative member for Brampton West, Ontario.
- Dalwinder Gill first elected in 2025 as Conservative member for Calgary McKnight, Alberta.
- Charles Gill b. 1844 first elected in 1874 as Conservative member for Yamaska, Quebec.
- Harb Gill first elected in 2025 as Liberal member for Windsor West, Ontario.
- Marilène Gill b. 1977 first elected in 2015 as Bloc Québécois member for Manicouagan, Quebec.
- Parm Gill b. 1974 first elected in 2011 as Conservative member for Brampton—Springdale, Ontario.
- Sukhman Gill first elected in 2025 as Conservative member for Abbotsford—South Langley, British Columbia.
- Alastair Gillespie b. 1922 first elected in 1968 as Liberal member for Etobicoke, Ontario.
- André Gillet b. 1916 first elected in 1958 as Progressive Conservative member for Mercier, Quebec.
- James McPhail Gillies b. 1924 first elected in 1972 as Progressive Conservative member for Don Valley, Ontario.
- John Gillies b. 1837 first elected in 1872 as Liberal member for Bruce North, Ontario.
- Joseph Alexander Gillies b. 1849 first elected in 1891 as Conservative member for Richmond, Nova Scotia.
- Clarence Gillis b. 1895 first elected in 1940 as CCF member for Cape Breton South, Nova Scotia.
- Arthur Hill Gillmor b. 1824 first elected in 1874 as Liberal member for Charlotte, New Brunswick.
- James Gilmour b. 1842 first elected in 1896 as Conservative member for Middlesex East, Ontario.
- William Gilmour b. 1942 first elected in 1993 as Reform member for Comox—Alberni, British Columbia.

== Gim–Giv ==
- Pierre J.J. Georges Adelard Gimaïel b. 1949 first elected in 1980 as Liberal member for Lac-Saint-Jean, Quebec.
- Ernest-Omer Gingras b. 1887 first elected in 1949 as Liberal member for Richmond—Wolfe, Quebec.
- René Gingras b. 1938 first elected in 1980 as Liberal member for Abitibi, Quebec.
- Maurice Gingues b. 1903 first elected in 1940 as Liberal member for Sherbrooke, Quebec.
- Albert Girard b. 1949 first elected in 1984 as Progressive Conservative member for Restigouche, New Brunswick.
- Fernand Girard b. 1924 first elected in 1953 as Independent member for Lapointe, Quebec.
- Joseph Girard b. 1853 first elected in 1900 as Conservative member for Chicoutimi—Saguenay, Quebec.
- Jocelyne Girard-Bujold b. 1943 first elected in 1997 as Bloc Québécois member for Jonquière, Quebec.
- Désiré Girouard b. 1836 first elected in 1878 as Conservative member for Jacques Cartier, Quebec.
- Gérard Girouard b. 1933 first elected in 1963 as Social Credit member for Labelle, Quebec.
- Gilbert Anselme Girouard b. 1846 first elected in 1878 as Liberal-Conservative member for Kent, New Brunswick.
- Joseph Girouard b. 1854 first elected in 1892 as Conservative member for Two Mountains, Quebec.
- Wilfrid Girouard b. 1891 first elected in 1925 as Liberal member for Drummond—Arthabaska, Quebec.
- Philip Gerald Givens b. 1922 first elected in 1968 as Liberal member for York West, Ontario.

== Gl ==
- Robert William Gladstone b. 1879 first elected in 1935 as Liberal member for Wellington South, Ontario.
- Marilyn Gladu b. 1962 first elected in 2015 as Conservative member for Sarnia—Lambton, Ontario.
- Oscar Gladu b. 1870 first elected in 1904 as Liberal member for Yamaska, Quebec.
- David Glass b. 1829 first elected in 1872 as Conservative member for Middlesex East, Ontario.
- Samuel Francis Glass b. 1861 first elected in 1913 as Conservative member for Middlesex East, Ontario.
- Alfred Gleave b. 1911 first elected in 1968 as New Democratic Party member for Saskatoon—Biggar, Saskatchewan.
- Francis Wayland Glen b. 1836 first elected in 1878 as Liberal member for Ontario South, Ontario.
- James Allison Glen b. 1877 first elected in 1926 as Liberal Progressive member for Marquette, Manitoba.
- Charles Auguste Maximilien Globensky b. 1830 first elected in 1875 as Independent member for Two Mountains, Quebec.
- Shelly Glover b. 1967 first elected in 2008 as Conservative member for St. Boniface, Manitoba.

== Gob–Goo ==
- Daniel Gobeil first elected in 2026 as Liberal member for Chicoutimi—Le Fjord, Quebec.
- Samuel Gobeil b. 1875 first elected in 1930 as Conservative member for Compton, Quebec.
- Joseph Godbout b. 1850 first elected in 1887 as Independent Liberal member for Beauce, Quebec.
- Marc Godbout b. 1951 first elected in 2004 as Liberal member for Ottawa—Orléans, Ontario.
- John Ferguson Godfrey b. 1942 first elected in 1993 as Liberal member for Don Valley West, Ontario.
- François Benjamin Godin b. 1828 first elected in 1867 as Liberal member for Joliette, Quebec.
- Joël Godin b. 1965 first elected in 2015 as Conservative member for Portneuf—Jacques-Cartier, Quebec.
- Maurice Godin b. 1932 first elected in 1993 as Bloc Québécois member for Châteauguay, Quebec.
- Osias Godin b. 1911 first elected in 1958 as Liberal member for Nickel Belt, Ontario.
- Roland Godin b. 1926 first elected in 1965 as Ralliement Créditiste member for Portneuf, Quebec.
- Yvon Godin b. 1955 first elected in 1997 as New Democratic Party member for Acadie—Bathurst, New Brunswick.
- Robert Goguen b. 1957 first elected in 2011 as Conservative member for Moncton—Riverview—Dieppe, New Brunswick.
- William Henry Golding b. 1878 first elected in 1932 as Liberal member for Huron South, Ontario.
- Peter Goldring b. 1944 first elected in 1997 as Reform member for Edmonton East, Alberta.
- Pamela Goldsmith-Jones b. 1961 first elected in 2015 as Liberal member for West Vancouver—Sunshine Coast—Sea to Sky Country, British Columbia.
- William Charles Good b. 1876 first elected in 1921 as Independent Progressive member for Brant, Ontario.
- Ralph Edward Goodale b. 1949 first elected in 1974 as Liberal member for Assiniboia, Saskatchewan.
- Thomas Henry Goode b. 1933 first elected in 1968 as Liberal member for Burnaby—Richmond, British Columbia.
- Tom Goode b. 1902 first elected in 1949 as Liberal member for Burnaby—Richmond, British Columbia.
- Arthur Samuel Goodeve b. 1860 first elected in 1908 as Conservative member for Kootenay, British Columbia.
- William Thomas Goodison b. 1876 first elected in 1925 as Liberal member for Lambton West, Ontario.
- Laila Goodridge first elected in 2021 as Conservative member for Fort McMurray—Cold Lake, Alberta.
- Gary Goodyear b. 1958 first elected in 2004 as Conservative member for Cambridge, Ontario.

== Gor–Goy ==
- Adam Gordon b. 1831 first elected in 1874 as Liberal member for Ontario North, Ontario.
- David Alexander Gordon b. 1858 first elected in 1904 as Liberal member for Kent East, Ontario.
- David William Gordon b. 1832 first elected in 1882 as Liberal-Conservative member for Vancouver, British Columbia.
- George Gordon b. 1865 first elected in 1908 as Conservative member for Nipissing, Ontario.
- George Newcombe Gordon b. 1879 first elected in 1921 as Liberal member for Peterborough West, Ontario.
- Walter Lockhart Gordon b. 1906 first elected in 1962 as Liberal member for Davenport, Ontario.
- Wesley Ashton Gordon b. 1884 first elected in 1930 as Conservative member for Timiskaming South, Ontario.
- John Kenneth Gormley b. 1957 first elected in 1984 as Progressive Conservative member for The Battlefords—Meadow Lake, Saskatchewan.
- Bal Gosal b. 1960 first elected in 2011 as Conservative member for Bramalea—Gore—Malton, Ontario.
- Henri A. Gosselin b. 1891 first elected in 1949 as Liberal member for Brome—Missisquoi, Quebec.
- Louis Gosselin b. 1879 first elected in 1935 as Liberal member for Brome—Missisquoi, Quebec.
- Eccles James Gott b. 1884 first elected in 1925 as Conservative member for Essex South, Ontario.
- Bill Gottselig b. 1934 first elected in 1984 as Progressive Conservative member for Moose Jaw, Saskatchewan.
- Monson Henry Goudge b. 1829 first elected in 1873 as Liberal member for Hants, Nova Scotia.
- Lomer Gouin b. 1861 first elected in 1921 as Liberal member for Laurier—Outremont, Quebec.
- Jim Gouk b. 1946 first elected in 1993 as Reform member for Kootenay West—Revelstoke, British Columbia.
- Isaac James Gould b. 1839 first elected in 1900 as Liberal member for Ontario West, Ontario.
- Karina Gould b. 1987 Liberal member for Burlington, Ontario.
- Oliver Robert Gould b. 1874 first elected in 1919 as United Farmers member for Assiniboia, Saskatchewan.
- Alfred Goulet b. 1875 first elected in 1925 as Liberal member for Russell, Ontario.
- Joseph-Omer Gour b. 1893 first elected in 1945 as Liberal member for Russell, Ontario.
- David Gourd b. 1885 first elected in 1945 as Liberal member for Chapleau, Quebec.
- Robert Gourd b. 1933 first elected in 1979 as Liberal member for Argenteuil, Quebec.
- Gaston Gourde b. 1950 first elected in 1981 as Liberal member for Lévis, Quebec.
- Jacques Gourde b. 1964 first elected in 2006 as Conservative member for Lotbinière—Chutes-de-la-Chaudière, Quebec.
- Seymour Eugene Gourley b. 1854 first elected in 1900 as Conservative member for Colchester, Nova Scotia.
- Jean-Pierre Goyer b. 1932 first elected in 1965 as Liberal member for Dollard, Quebec.

== Gra ==
- Heward Grafftey b. 1928 first elected in 1958 as Progressive Conservative member for Brome—Missisquoi, Quebec.
- Bill Graham b. 1939 first elected in 1993 as Liberal member for Rosedale, Ontario.
- David de Burgh Graham b. 1981 first elected in 2015 as Liberal member for Laurentides—Labelle, Quebec.
- Duncan Graham b. 1845 first elected in 1897 as Independent Liberal member for Ontario North, Ontario.
- George Perry Graham b. 1859 first elected in 1907 as Liberal member for Brockville, Ontario.
- Roy Theodore Graham b. 1887 first elected in 1940 as Liberal member for Swift Current, Saskatchewan.
- Stan Graham b. 1926 first elected in 1979 as Progressive Conservative member for Kootenay East—Revelstoke, British Columbia.
- Paul Étienne Grandbois b. 1846 first elected in 1878 as Conservative member for Témiscouata, Quebec.
- Charles Granger b. 1912 first elected in 1958 as Liberal member for Grand Falls—White Bay—Labrador, Newfoundland and Labrador.
- George Davidson Grant b. 1870 first elected in 1903 as Liberal member for Ontario North, Ontario.
- James Alexander Grant b. 1831 first elected in 1867 as Conservative member for Russell, Ontario.
- Thomas Vincent Grant b. 1876 first elected in 1935 as Liberal member for King's, Prince Edward Island.
- Wade Grant first elected in 2025 as Liberal member for Vancouver Quadra, British Columbia.
- Michel Gravel b. 1939 first elected in 1984 as Progressive Conservative member for Gamelin, Quebec.
- Raymond Gravel b. 1952 first elected in 2006 as Bloc Québécois member for Repentigny, Quebec.
- Claude Gravelle b. 1949 first elected in 2008 as New Democratic member for Nickel Belt, Ontario.
- Darryl Gray b. 1946 first elected in 1984 as Progressive Conservative member for Bonaventure—Îles-de-la-Madeleine, Quebec.
- Herb Gray b. 1931 first elected in 1962 as Liberal member for Essex West, Ontario.
- John Hamilton Gray b. 1814 first elected in 1867 as Conservative member for City and County of St. John, New Brunswick.
- Ross Wilfred Gray b. 1897 first elected in 1929 as Liberal member for Lambton West, Ontario.
- Tracy Gray first elected in 2019 as Conservative member for Kelowna—Lake Country, British Columbia.
- William Gray b. 1862 first elected in 1915 as Conservative member for London, Ontario.
- Gordon Graydon b. 1896 first elected in 1935 as Conservative member for Peel, Ontario.

== Gre–Gru ==
- Will Greaves first elected in 2025 as Liberal member for Victoria, British Columbia.
- Howard Charles Green b. 1895 first elected in 1935 as Conservative member for Vancouver South, British Columbia.
- Matthew Green b. 1980 first elected in 2019 as New Democratic Party member for Hamilton Centre, Ontario.
- Robert Francis Green b. 1861 first elected in 1912 as Conservative member for Kootenay, British Columbia.
- Lorne Greenaway b. 1933 first elected in 1979 as Progressive Conservative member for Cariboo—Chilcotin, British Columbia.
- Barbara Greene b. 1945 first elected in 1988 as Progressive Conservative member for Don Valley North, Ontario.
- John James Greene b. 1920 first elected in 1963 as Liberal member for Renfrew South, Ontario.
- Thomas Greenway b. 1838 first elected in 1875 as Independent member for Huron South, Ontario.
- Milton Gregg b. 1892 first elected in 1947 as Liberal member for York—Sunbury, New Brunswick.
- Gilles Grégoire b. 1926 first elected in 1962 as Social Credit member for Lapointe, Quebec.
- John Albert Gregory b. 1878 first elected in 1940 as Liberal member for The Battlefords, Saskatchewan.
- Lucien Grenier b. 1925 first elected in 1958 as Progressive Conservative member for Bonaventure, Quebec.
- Gurmant Grewal b. 1957 first elected in 1997 as Reform member for Surrey Central, British Columbia.
- Nina Grewal b. 1958 first elected in 2004 as Conservative member for Fleetwood—Port Kells, British Columbia.
- Raj Grewal b. 1985 first elected in 2015 as Liberal member for Brampton East, Ontario.
- Deborah Grey b. 1952 first elected in 1989 as Reform member for Beaver River, Alberta.
- Terrence Grier b. 1936 first elected in 1972 as New Democratic Party member for Toronto—Lakeshore, Ontario.
- William Griesbach b. 1878 first elected in 1917 as Unionist member for Edmonton West, Alberta.
- James Nicol Grieve b. 1855 first elected in 1891 as Liberal member for Perth North, Ontario.
- Lee Elgy Grills b. 1904 first elected in 1957 as Progressive Conservative member for Hastings South, Ontario.
- Robert Watson Grimmer b. 1866 first elected in 1921 as Conservative member for Charlotte, New Brunswick.
- Richard Grisé b. 1944 first elected in 1984 as Progressive Conservative member for Chambly, Quebec.
- Sadia Groguhé b. 1962 first elected in 2011 as New Democratic Party member for Saint-Lambert, Quebec.
- Jason Groleau first elected in 2025 as Conservative member for Beauce, Quebec.
- Gilles Grondin b. 1943 first elected in 1986 as Liberal member for Saint-Maurice, Quebec.
- David Walter Groos b. 1918 first elected in 1963 as Liberal member for Victoria, British Columbia.
- Ivan Grose b. 1928 first elected in 1993 as Liberal member for Oshawa, Ontario.
- Peregrine Maitland Grover b. 1818 first elected in 1867 as Conservative member for Peterborough East, Ontario.
- Herbert G. Grubel b. 1934 first elected in 1993 as Reform member for Capilano—Howe Sound, British Columbia.
- Dennis Gruending b. 1948 first elected in 1999 as New Democratic Party member for Saskatoon—Rosetown—Biggar, Saskatchewan.

== Gu ==
- Albina Guarnieri b. 1953 first elected in 1988 as Liberal member for Mississauga East, Ontario.
- Claude Guay first elected in 2025 as Liberal member for LaSalle—Émard—Verdun, Quebec.
- Joseph-Philippe Guay b. 1915 first elected in 1968 as Liberal member for St. Boniface, Manitoba.
- Monique Guay b. 1959 first elected in 1993 as Bloc Québécois member for Laurentides, Quebec.
- Pierre Malcom Guay b. 1848 first elected in 1885 as Liberal member for Lévis, Quebec.
- Raynald Joseph Albert Guay b. 1933 first elected in 1963 as Liberal member for Lévis, Quebec.
- Helena Guergis b. 1969 first elected in 2004 as Conservative member for Simcoe—Grey, Ontario.
- James John Edmund Guérin b. 1856 first elected in 1925 as Liberal member for St. Ann, Quebec.
- Michael Guglielmin first elected in 2025 as Conservative member for Vaughan—Woodbridge, Ontario.
- Édouard Guilbault b. 1834 first elected in 1882 as Conservative member for Joliette, Quebec.
- Jacques Guilbault b. 1936 first elected in 1968 as Liberal member for Saint-Jacques, Quebec.
- Jean-Guy Guilbault b. 1931 first elected in 1984 as Progressive Conservative member for Drummond, Quebec.
- Joseph Pierre Octave Guilbault b. 1870 first elected in 1911 as Conservative member for Joliette, Quebec.
- Steven Guilbeault b. 1970 first elected in 2019 as Liberal member for Laurier—Sainte-Marie, Quebec.
- George Guillet b. 1840 first elected in 1881 as Conservative member for Northumberland West, Ontario.
- Claude Guimond b. 1963 first elected in 2008 as Bloc Québécois member for Rimouski-Neigette—Témiscouata—Les Basques, Quebec.
- Michel Guimond b. 1953 first elected in 1993 as Bloc Québécois member for Beauport—Montmorency—Orléans, Quebec.
- Jean-François Guité b. 1852 first elected in 1897 as Liberal member for Bonaventure, Quebec.
- Mandy Gull-Masty first elected in 2025 as Liberal member for Abitibi—Baie-James—Nunavik—Eeyou, Quebec.
- Deane Gundlock b. 1914 first elected in 1958 as Progressive Conservative member for Lethbridge, Alberta.
- Aaron Gunn first elected in 2025 as Conservative member for North Island—Powell River, British Columbia.
- Alexander Gunn b. 1828 first elected in 1878 as Liberal member for Kingston, Ontario.
- Benjamin B. Gunn b. 1860 first elected in 1904 as Conservative member for Huron South, Ontario.
- Gary Gurbin b. 1941 first elected in 1979 as Progressive Conservative member for Bruce—Grey, Ontario.
- Lenard Gustafson b. 1933 first elected in 1979 as Progressive Conservative member for Assiniboia, Saskatchewan.
- Donald Guthrie b. 1840 first elected in 1876 as Liberal member for Wellington South, Ontario.
- Hugh Guthrie b. 1866 first elected in 1900 as Liberal member for Wellington South, Ontario.
