= Samuel Simpson Sharpe =

Canadian politician

Lieutenant Colonel Samuel Simpson Sharpe DSO, MP
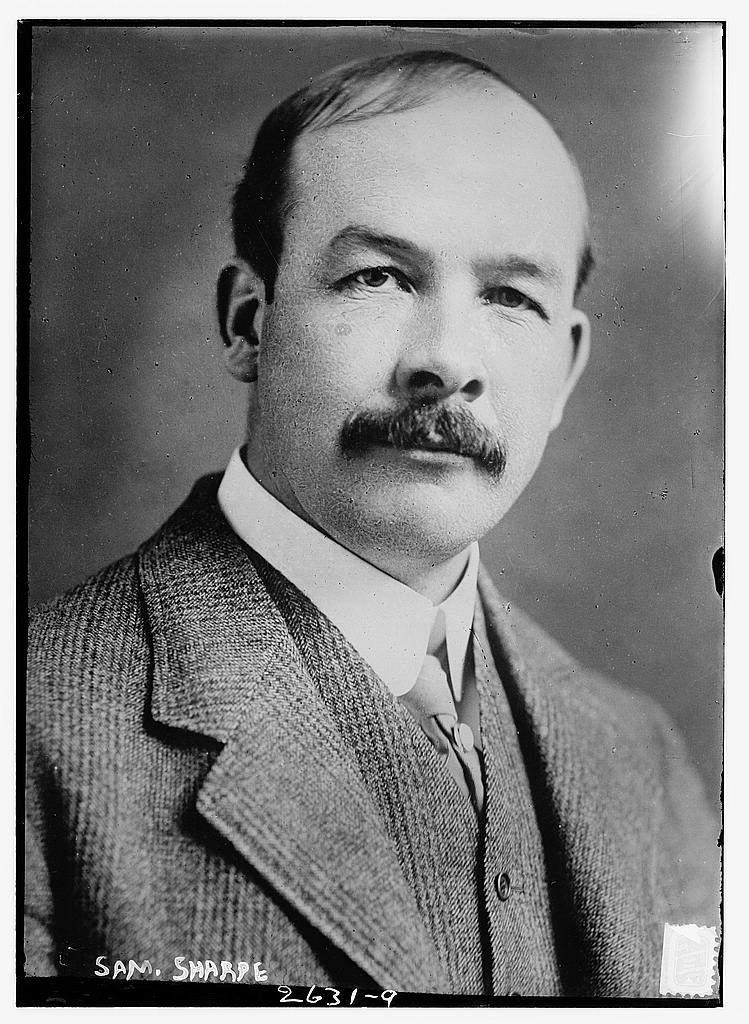

Member of the Canadian Parliament for Ontario North
- In office 1909–1918
- Preceded by: George Davidson Grant
- Succeeded by: Robert Henry Halbert

Personal details
- Born: March 13, 1873 Zephyr, Ontario, Canada
- Died: May 25, 1918 (aged 45) Montreal, Quebec, Canada
- Party: Conservative, Unionist
- Spouse: Mabel Crosby
- Relations: William Henry Sharpe, brother
- Education: University of Toronto
- Profession: Lawyer

Military service
- Branch/service: Army
- Rank: Lieutenant Colonel
- Unit: 34th Ontario Regiment, 116th Battalion, CEF
- Commands: 116th Battalion, CEF
- Battles/wars: Vimy Ridge, Passchendaele
- Awards: Distinguished Service Order

Lt-Col. Samuel Simpson Sharpe DSO, MP (March 13, 1873 – May 25, 1918) was a lawyer, political figure, and soldier from Ontario, Canada. He represented Ontario North in the House of Commons of Canada from 1909 to 1917 as a Conservative and from 1917 to 1918 as a Unionist Party member.

From 1916 until his death, he served as a Member of Parliament while on active duty with the Canadian Expeditionary Force. Along with George Harold Baker, he was one of only two sitting Canadian MPs to die on military service.

== Early life ==
He was born in Zephyr, Ontario, the son of George Sharpe, a native of England, and Mary Ann Simpson, a native of Ireland. Sharpe was educated in Uxbridge, at the University of Toronto and Osgoode Hall, graduating in 1895. In 1903, he married Mabel E. Crosby, a granddaughter of Joseph Gould. Sharpe practised law in Uxbridge and was town solicitor for 10 years.

Prior to the First World War, Sharpe served as a member of the 34th Ontario Regiment, joining at age sixteen and eventually achieving the rank of Major.

His brother William Henry Sharpe served in both the House of Commons of Canada and the Senate of Canada.

== Political career ==
Sharpe was elected as the Member of Parliament for Ontario North in the 1908 federal election, representing the Conservative Party. He was re-elected in 1911. After the 1911 election, Prime Minister Robert Borden considered Sharpe for the position of Minister of Militia and Defence, before deciding on Sam Hughes. Sharpe later clashed with Hughes in Parliament over militia policy and the Minister's abrasive personal style.

During the 1917 election, Sharpe ran for the Unionist Party. He was elected in absentia, as he was at the time serving overseas with the Canadian Expeditionary Force.

1908 Canadian federal election: Ontario North
Party	Candidate	Votes
Conservative	Samuel S. Sharpe	2,208
Liberal	George Davidson Grant	2,008

1911 Canadian federal election: Ontario North
Party	Candidate	Votes
Conservative	Samuel Simpson Sharpe	2,130
Liberal	Herbert Macdonald Mowat	1,572

1917 Canadian federal election: Ontario North
Party	Candidate	Votes
Government (Unionist)	Samuel Simpson Sharpe	3,123
Opposition (Laurier Liberals)	Frederick Hogg	1,568

== First World War ==
On the outbreak of the First World War, Sharpe was initially passed over for a command position and was not part of the First Contingent of the Canadian Expeditionary Force that deployed overseas in 1914. Sharpe considered his past conflict with Minister Sam Hughes as the reason he was overlooked, and expressed concern that this would affect his reputation.

In November 1915, Sharpe was authorized by Hughes to raise a battalion from Ontario County. This led to the creation of the 116th Battalion (Ontario County), CEF, with many members drawn from the 34th Regiment and several personally recruited by Sharpe.

Sharpe used his political influence to ensure that the 116th was kept together as a unit in Europe and not dispersed to reinforce existing units. The Battalion arrived in England in the summer of 1916 and, following training, was deployed to the front in France in February 1917.

Sharpe commanded the Battalion in action, beginning with the Battle of Vimy Ridge in April 1917. Subsequent actions included an attack at Avion in preparation for the Battle of Hill 70, and the Battle of Passchendaele.

Sharpe began to struggle with the impact of his military service. In October 1917, he wrote to Muriel Hutchison, the widow of Lieutenant Thomas Hutchison. Sharpe had served with Hutchison in the 34th Regiment before the war, and was present when he was injured by a shell blast, administering first aid to him. In his letter to Muriel, Sharpe said:

It is awful to contemplate the misery and suffering in this old world, and were I to allow myself to ponder over what I have seen and what I have suffered thro [sic] the loss of the bravest and best in the world, I would soon become absolutely incapable of 'carrying on'.

In December 1917, Sharpe returned to England for a senior officer's course. Early the next year he was awarded the Distinguished Service Order in the 1918 New Year Honours. A short time after receiving the award, he was hospitalized with a diagnosis of "general debility".

In May 1918, Sharpe returned to Canada on convalescent leave. En route back to Uxbridge with his wife, he was hospitalized at Montreal's Royal Victoria Hospital for nervous shock.

== Death and legacy ==
On May 25, 1918, Sharpe died by suicide, jumping from a hospital window to his death. Due to the stigma surrounding suicide and mental illness, Sharpe's history was largely forgotten in Canada for almost 100 years.

Sharpe's name was included in the Great War Memorial at the Law Society of Ontario's library in Osgoode Hall.

In 2014, Member of Parliament Erin O'Toole and Senator Romeo Dallaire inaugurated the Lieutenant Colonel Sam Sharpe Veterans Mental Health breakfast to showcase veterans’ mental health issues and to recognize those "who have sought help for their operational stress injuries and are leading productive lives."

In 2016, a bronze plaque including the likeness of Sharpe by sculptor Tyler Briley acknowledging Sharpe's service as an MP and soldier was commissioned for installation in the Centre Block of Canada's Parliament. The plaque was unveiled in the foyer of the House of Commons on November 7, 2018.

In 2019, the Durham Regional Courthouse was renamed the Lieutenant-Colonel Samuel S. Sharpe, DSO, MP Courthouse.
