= Peter McGibbon =

Canadian politician

Member of the Canadian Parliament for Muskoka
- In office 1917–1921
- Preceded by: William Wright
- Succeeded by: William James Hammell

Member of the Canadian Parliament for Muskoka—Ontario
- In office 1925–1935
- Succeeded by: Stephen Joseph Furniss

Personal details
- Born: August 19, 1873 St. Thomas, Ontario, Canada
- Died: October 10, 1936 (aged 63)
- Party: Conservative
- Occupation: Physician

Peter McGibbon (August 19, 1873 – October 10, 1936) was a Canadian politician.

== Biography ==
Born in St. Thomas, Ontario, McGibbon was a physician by profession. During World War I, he was a medical officer with the 1st Black Watch and the 8th Royal Berkshire Regiment. He was awarded the Military Cross in 1915. A city councillor for the city of Bracebridge, Ontario, he was first elected to the House of Commons of Canada for the electoral district of Muskoka in 1917 as a Unionist. He was defeated in 1921 but was re-elected in 1925 as a Conservative for the newly created electoral district of Muskoka—Ontario. He was defeated in 1935.
