= Alma Gould Dale =

Canadian Quaker minister (1854–1930)

Personal details
- Born: October 27, 1854 Uxbridge, Ontario, Canada
- Died: August 29, 1930 (aged 75)
- Denomination: Society of Friends
- Parents: Joseph Gould

Alma Gould Dale (October 27, 1854 – August 29, 1930), "a legendary figure in Canada history," founded the first monthly Quaker meeting in western Canada, at Hartney, Manitoba, in 1899. She represents the Quaker presence in Canada on one of the seventy-five panels in the Quaker Tapestry at Friends' House, in London, where she is credited with a major role in the growth of Quakerism in Canada from 1800 on. On the tapestry, she is depicted driving a palomino team to a Quaker settlement in western Canada, which she drove in all weather. She was well known as a dynamic speaker and was invited to speak in Canada, England, and New Zealand.

== Life ==
Alma Dale was born in Uxbridge, Ontario, on October 27, 1854. She grew up in the Uxbridge Quaker community, which had been established in the early 1800s. Her parents were Joseph and Mary Gould (née James). Her brother was Isaac James Gould. Her father had taken part in the Rebellion of 1837 and later represented North Ontario in the Legislative Assembly of Canada from 1854 to 1861.

Dale spent eleven years, from 1887 to 1898, as a minister in Uxbridge, Ontario. During this time, she organized a Mission School. In 1898, the Canadian Yearly Meeting authorized Dale to set up meetings in locations of her choice, so she went west as a pioneer minister. In 1899, she organized a monthly meeting at Hartney, Manitoba, under the care of the Yonge Street Quarterly Meeting. While at Hartney, she was also instrumental in establishing a chapter of the Women's Christian Temperance Union. She helped to design and build the church building in Hartney. In a diary-style description of a visit to the western provinces, Jane Zavitz-Bond notes that Alma Dale was even seen up on the roof shingling. The church building was later moved to nearby Dand to be used by the United Church of Canada.

Dale's activities were wide-ranging. In 1907, she reported that she made 109 family visits, held 60 meetings attended by about 2050 persons, and drove 1800 miles in western Canada She also visited England on a 24-day mission to Hermonceux, but she suffered from bad health during this visit. A report of the visit mentions the return of "doubters, drunkards, and backsliders and doubling of attendance at various meetings.

Dale worked until her death at 76, on August 29, 1930. The Journal of the Canadian Friends Historical Association described her as a dynamic speaker able to arouse people's consciousness. In the days before women were acknowledged as having public voices, she accepted speaking engagements in Canada, England, and New Zealand. Bessie Dann recalled a sermon from Dale when she was visiting Norwich, taken from the Proverbs text "The spider taketh hold with her hands and is in king's palaces." In her diary, Gertrude Nicholson describes Alma Dale as "a little lady with short hair [who] dresses rather mannishly." She also mentioned the liveliness of her speaking style and her ability to manage horses.
