= James Glendinning (Canadian politician) =

Canadian politician (1849–1929)

Ontario MPP
- In office 1890–1894
- Preceded by: Isaac James Gould
- Succeeded by: Thomas William Chapple
- Constituency: Ontario North

Personal details
- Born: June 2, 1849 Brock Township, Canada West
- Died: November 26, 1929 (aged 80) Ontario, Canada
- Party: Conservative
- Spouse: Elizabeth Doble (m. 1871)
- Occupation: Farmer

James Glendinning (June 2, 1849 – November 26, 1929) was an Ontario farmer and political figure. He represented Ontario North in the Legislative Assembly of Ontario as a Conservative member from 1890 to 1894.

He was born in Brock Township, Canada West in 1849 and grew up there. In 1871, he married Elizabeth Doble. Glendinning served on the township council for Brock and was reeve from 1885 to 1890. He lived near Vroomanton. He died in 1929.
