= Frank Madill =

Frank Madill may refer to:

- Frank Madill (Australian politician)
- Frank Madill (Canadian politician)
