= Alexander Peter Cockburn =

Canadian politician

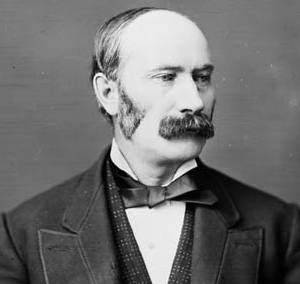

Member of Parliament for Ontario North
- In office 1882–1887
- Preceded by: George Wheler
- Succeeded by: Frank Madill

Member of Parliament for Muskoka
- In office 1872–1882
- Preceded by: Riding created
- Succeeded by: Riding abolished

Ontario MPP
- In office 1867–1871
- Preceded by: Riding established
- Succeeded by: Duncan McRae
- Constituency: Victoria North

Personal details
- Born: April 7, 1837 Finch, Upper Canada
- Died: June 2, 1905 (aged 68) Toronto, Ontario
- Party: Liberal
- Occupation: Businessman

Alexander Peter Cockburn (April 7, 1837 – June 2, 1905) was a Canadian businessman and political figure. He represented Victoria North in the 1st Parliament of Ontario and Muskoka and then Ontario North in the House of Commons of Canada as a Liberal member from 1872 to 1887.

He was born in Finch in 1837, the son of Scottish immigrants. He moved to Kirkfield with his family in 1857. He opened a store there in 1863 and became postmaster. He was reeve of Eldon Township from 1864 to 1865. In 1864, he moved to Orillia. After a visit to the Muskoka District in 1865, he moved to Gravenhurst, where he opened a general store, established stagecoach service and initiated steamboat service on Lake Muskoka. In 1867, he helped found the Muskoka Settler's Association and became its first president. While in office, he lobbied for improved rail and water links to the region. Cockburn also published pamphlets describing the natural beauty of the region, aimed at promoting tourism. His steamboat operation expanded to ten ships and a booming resort industry developed in the Muskoka region, that has continued to the present time.

He died in Toronto in 1905.

== Electoral history ==
1867 Ontario general election: Victoria North
Party	Candidate	Votes	%
Liberal	Alexander Peter Cockburn	676	62.42
Conservative	Joseph Staples	407	37.58
Total valid votes		1,083	79.87
Eligible voters		1,356	
Liberal pickup new district.			
Source: Elections Ontario
