= Muskoka (federal electoral district) =

Former federal electoral district in Ontario, Canada

Ontario electoral district

Defunct federal electoral district
- Legislature: House of Commons
- District created: 1872, 1903
- District abolished: 1882, 1924
- First contested: 1872
- Last contested: 1921

Muskoka was a federal electoral district represented in the House of Commons of Canada from 1872 to 1882 and from 1904 to 1925. It was located in the province of Ontario.

This riding was first created from part of Victoria North and from areas that until then were unrepresented.

It initially consisted of the Townships of Morrison, Ryde, Muskoka, Draper, Oakley, Wood, Monck, Macauley, McLean, Medora, Watt, Stephenson, Brunel, Humphrey, Cardwell, Stisted, Chaffey, Christie, Monteith, McMurrich, Matchitt, Ryerson, Spence, McKellar, McDougall, Ferguson, Carling, Hagerman, Croft, Chapman, Ferrie, Mackenzie, Wilson, Brown, Blair, Mowat Cowper, Conger, Parry Island, Parry Sound, Aumick Lake Territory, Maganetawan, and all other surveyed townships lying north of the North Riding of Victoria, and south of the Nipissing District.

The electoral district was abolished in 1882 when it was redistributed between Muskoka and Parry Sound, Ontario North and Simcoe East ridings.

It was re-created in 1903 from Muskoka and Parry Sound riding, and consisted of the territorial district of Muskoka.

The electoral district was abolished in 1924 when it was merged into Muskoka—Ontario riding.

== Members of Parliament ==
This riding has elected the following members of Parliament:

Parliament	Years	Member	Party
Riding created from Victoria North and Rupert's Land
2nd	1872–1874	Alexander Peter Cockburn	Liberal
3rd	1874–1878	Alexander Peter Cockburn	Liberal
4th	1878–1882	Alexander Peter Cockburn	Liberal
Riding dissolved into Muskoka and Parry Sound, Ontario North and Simcoe East
Riding re-created from Muskoka and Parry Sound
10th	1904–1908	William Wright	Conservative
11th	1908–1911	William Wright	Conservative
12th	1911–1917	William Wright	Conservative
13th	1917–1921	Peter McGibbon	Government (Unionist)
14th	1921–1925	William James Hammell	Progressive
Riding dissolved into Muskoka—Ontario

== Election history ==
=== 1872–1882 ===
1872 Canadian federal election
Party	Candidate	Votes
Liberal	Alexander Peter Cockburn	651
Unknown	D'Arcy Boulton	530

1874 Canadian federal election
Party	Candidate	Votes
Liberal	Alexander Peter Cockburn	876
Unknown	J. Teviotdale	567

1878 Canadian federal election
Party	Candidate	Votes
Liberal	Alexander Peter Cockburn	1,259
Unknown	William Edward O'Brien	1,196

=== 1903-1924 ===
1904 Canadian federal election
Party	Candidate	Votes
Conservative	William Wright	2,121
Liberal	Duncan Marshall	1,653

1908 Canadian federal election
Party	Candidate	Votes
Conservative	William Wright	2,248
Liberal	Angus Morrison	1,531

1911 Canadian federal election
Party	Candidate	Votes
Conservative	William Wright	2,282
Liberal	Geo. Henry Oakwood Thomas	1,262

1917 Canadian federal election
Party	Candidate	Votes
Government (Unionist)	Peter McGibbon	3,457
Opposition (Laurier Liberals)	George Henry Oakwood Thomas	1,878

1921 Canadian federal election
Party	Candidate	Votes
Progressive	William James Hammell	3,651
Conservative	Peter McGibbon	3,517

== See also ==
- List of Canadian electoral districts
- Historical federal electoral districts of Canada
