= J. F. Paxton =

Canadian ice hockey administrator (1857–1936)

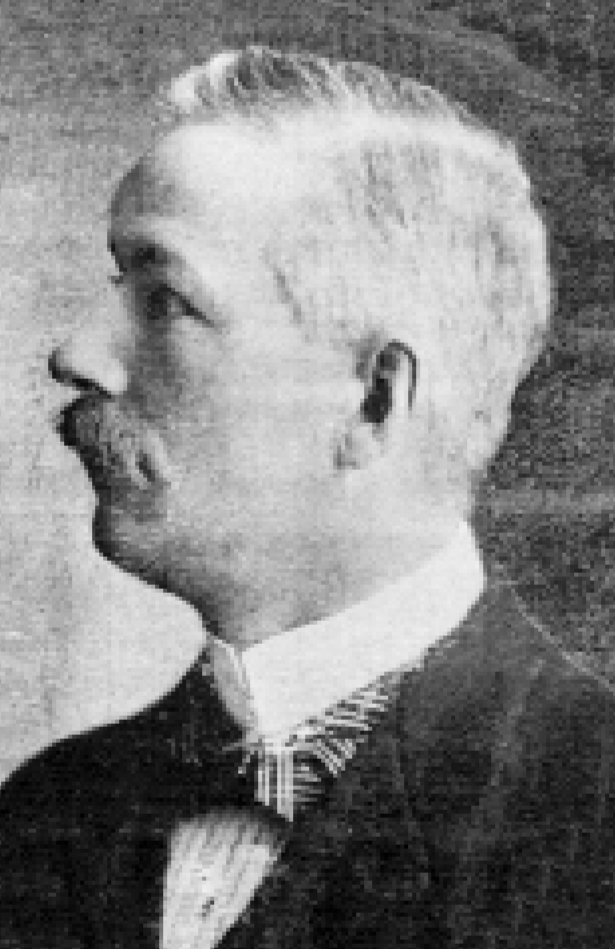
- Born: John Franklin Paxton; October 14, 1857; Port Perry, Province of Canada
- Died: May 12, 1936 (aged 78); Montreal, Quebec, Canada
- Occupation: Ontario County sheriff
- Known for: Ontario Hockey Association and Canadian Amateur Hockey Association
- Father: Thomas Paxton

John Franklin Paxton (October 14, 1857 – May 12, 1936) was a Canadian ice hockey administrator. He served as president of the Ontario Hockey Association (OHA), and was the acting president of the Canadian Amateur Hockey Association during World War I. He ensured that competition for the Allan Cup continued, which saw increased participation from military teams playing senior ice hockey in Canada. He partnered with W. A. Hewitt to negotiate a relationship with the International Skating Union of America to resume hockey games between Canada and the United States that had ended due to the war. Paxton later served as treasurer of the OHA, was a regular delegate to the general meetings of the Amateur Athletic Union of Canada, and represented the old guard of strict principles of amateurism where hockey players did not accept money. He served as the sheriff of Ontario County from 1887 until 1932, and was the son of politician and industrialist Thomas Paxton. After Paxton's death, the Winnipeg Free Press referred to him as both "Canada's most beloved hockey official", and "hockey's most beloved figure".

== Early life and family ==
John Franklin Paxton was born on October 14, 1857, in Port Perry, Province of Canada. He was the son of Thomas Paxton and Eliza Huckins. Paxton's paternal grandparents immigrated to Upper Canada in 1820, from Walsingham, England. Thomas Paxton was a local industrialist and businessman, who served as reeve of Reach Township and represented Ontario North in the Legislative Assembly of Ontario from 1867 to 1881.

Paxton was married to Addie Eliza Eck, with whom he had three sons and one daughter. In January 1881, Thomas Paxton became sheriff of Ontario County and relocated the family to Whitby, Ontario.

== Ontario County sheriff ==
Thomas Paxton died on July 3, 1887. Paxton was appointed to succeed his father as sheriff of Ontario Country, and remained in the position until his own retirement in 1932. His duties as sheriff included transfer and escort of prisoners from Whitby to the Kingston Penitentiary, and arrangements for execution by hanging at the Lindsay Jail. He also served as the returning officer for the 1898 Ontario general election in Ontario County. In November 1893, sheriff's assistant Samuel Houston was put in charge of sixteen head of cattle and four horses and disappeared. Paxton offered a reward of C$75 for Houston's arrest.

== Sporting career ==
Paxton participated in curling and lawn bowling as recreational sports. He was the skip of a Whitby rink for intercity curling competitions in Ontario County in 1897, and was the skip of a Whitby team in the Lake Shore Lawn Bowling Association in 1911. He was the first president of the Ontario-Durham Baseball League, when it was founded in 1910 by delegates from Whitby, Oshawa, Bowmanville and Port Perry.

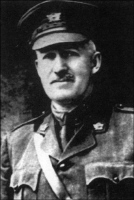
James T. Sutherland

Paxton was elected vice-president of the Ontario Hockey Association (OHA) in December 1915, with James T. Sutherland as the president. Sutherland had also been elected president of the Canadian Amateur Hockey Association (CAHA), then enlisted in the Canadian Expeditionary Force during World War I. Paxton became the acting president of the CAHA from 1916 to 1918, and handled OHA business while Sutherland was deployed to Europe.

The provincial associations within the CAHA favoured not having an annual meeting in 1916 or 1917 due to decreased revenue from player registrations during the war and to avoid the added expense of sending delegates to a meeting. Paxton and W. A. Hewitt conducted CAHA business by mail-in votes which retained the elected officers during the war, and continued competition for the Allan Cup which saw increased participation from military teams playing senior ice hockey.

Paxton was elected president of the OHA in December 1917, to succeed Sutherland who was still in Europe. At the meeting, Paxton put hockey players into the same context as other Canadians who enlisted in the war. He cautioned against glorifying them above ordinary citizens but wanted to ensure the players who died were remembered. In December 1918, R. M. Glover became the OHA president and Paxton remained on the executive when he was elected treasurer of the OHA.

Paxton was a regular delegate to the general meetings of the Amateur Athletic Union of Canada (AAU of C) during his tenure with the OHA. He was a member of the AAU of C's alliance and affiliation committee, and sat on a special committee to arrange a homecoming for the Toronto Granites who were gold medalists in ice hockey at the 1924 Winter Olympics. The Canadian Olympic Committee named Paxton to its committee to prepare for Canada's participation at the 1932 Winter Olympics.

Paxton and W. A. Hewitt were delegated by the CAHA to negotiate a relationship with the International Skating Union of America, and reached an agreement in October 1919 to resume ice hockey games between Canada and the United States that had ended due to World War I. Paxton and Hewitt subsequently met with the United States Amateur Hockey Association established in 1920, and discussed an agreement for the migration of players between the countries.

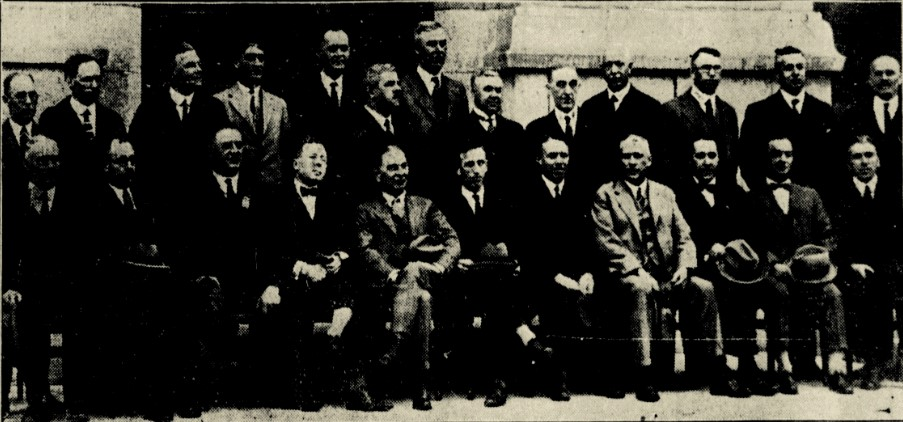
1924 Amateur Athletic Union of Canada annual meeting group photo

The AAU of C appointed Paxton to an independent commission at the request of the CAHA in 1921, to investigate the status of amateur player transfers across Canada and to discourage false amateur registration of professionals. The committee had its power expanded to resolve all hockey disputes and to investigate registrations. Paxton recommended that permission be required from the player's current team to transfer elsewhere.

In 1922, the CAHA accepted the Hamilton B. Wills Trophy as the senior hockey championship of North America, which saw the Allan Cup champion challenge the United States Amateur Hockey Association (USAHA) champion in a playoffs series. In 1923, Paxton and Hewitt collaborated to negotiate an agreement to govern the migration of senior hockey players to and from the USAHA.

The 1928 general meeting of the OHA debated the status of growing professionalism in the amateur game in Canada. Paxton sought to adhere to strict principles of amateurism, where players in the OHA did not accept any money or gifts. He was against a proposal for the National Hockey League to place its prospect players in junior ice hockey. The OHA chose to assert its control of amateur hockey in the province, and updated its constitution to exclude participation by any person actively connected to a professional sport.

== Later life ==
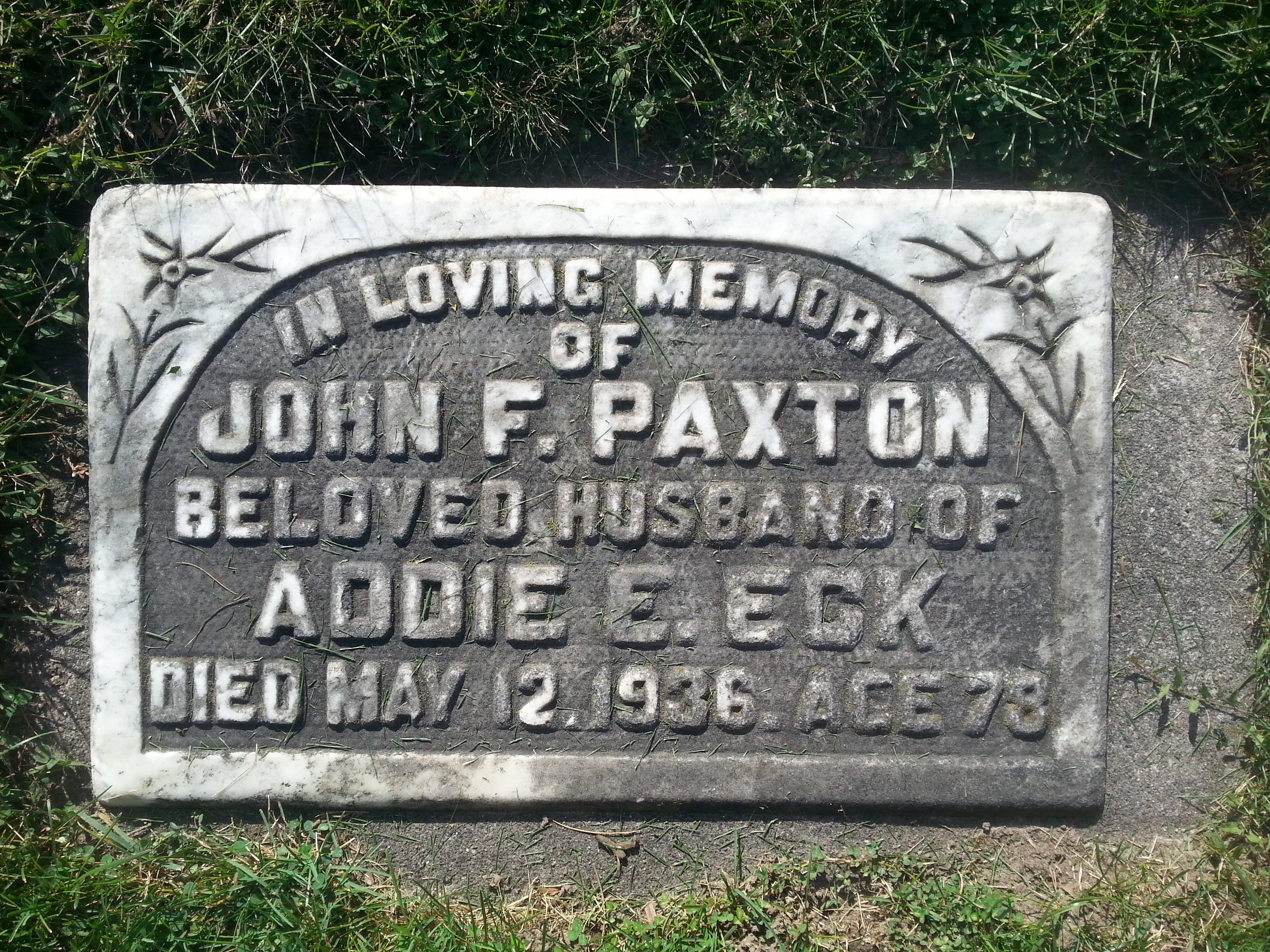
Paxton's grave stone

When Paxton retired as sheriff and moved to Montreal in 1932, OHA leaders wanted him to remain on the executive. They refused to accept his resignation as treasurer, and he continued to take care of the association's funds despite living outside of Ontario. He died on May 12, 1936, in Montreal, and was interred in Union Cemetery in Oshawa. He had been ill for two weeks prior to his death with a heart ailment, and named his own pallbearers who included, W. A. Hewitt, Canadian Olympic Committee president Patrick J. Mulqueen, AAU of C president W. A. Fry, and OHA president George Dudley. Dudley succeeded Paxton as treasurer at the OHA general meeting later in 1936.

== Honours and legacy ==
Paxton received an engraved gold medal from the CAHA for his services when the tradition of honouring presidents was established in 1924. He was made a life member of the OHA in 1929 while still on the executive. He was the namesake of the Sheriff Paxton Trophy series, an in-season rivalry between junior hockey teams in Whitby and Bowmanville. The OHA established the J. F. Paxton Cup for the A-division playoffs champion of senior hockey, which was first awarded in 1935 to a team from Whitby. The trophy went dormant in the 1990s, then was resurrected by the Ontario Elite Hockey League for the 2023–24 season.

After Paxton's death, the Winnipeg Free Press referred to him as both "Canada's most beloved hockey official", and "hockey's most beloved figure". CAHA president E. A. Gilroy stated that Paxton always insisted on justice where it was due and "was one of the greatest boosters of amateur hockey in Canada". Journalist E. A. Armstrong described Paxton as energetic despite his age, and that he was both feared and respected at meetings and commanded attention. Armstrong reported that, "When [Paxton] found opinion swinging against his motions, he could send the meeting into a hilarious uproar by promptly ordering a hanging for every individual who opposed him".

== Sources ==
- Mackintosh, C. H. (1877). The Canadian Parliamentary Companion and Annual Register. Ottawa, Ontario: Citizen Printing and Publishing Company. p. 267 – via Canadiana.org.
- Young, Scott (1989). 100 Years of Dropping the Puck. Toronto, Ontario: McClelland & Stewart. ISBN 0-7710-9093-5.
- Ontario Hockey Association (2006). Annual Report: Constitution, Regulations and Rules of Competition. Cambridge, Ontario.
- Canadian Amateur Hockey Association (1990). Constitution, By-laws, Regulations, History. Gloucester, Ontario.
