= Widdifield =

Widdifield is a surname. Notable people with the surname include:

- John Wesley Widdifield (1869–1943), Canadian politician
- Joseph Henry Widdifield (1845–1906), Canadian politician
