= George McCormick (Canadian politician) =

Canadian politician

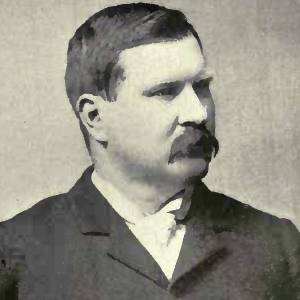
George McCormick

George McCormick (October 7, 1856 – October 13, 1907) was a lumberman and political figure in Ontario, Canada. He represented Muskoka and Parry Sound in the House of Commons of Canada from 1896 to 1904 as a Liberal-Conservative.

He was born in Lochaber, Canada East. McCormick served on the town council of Orillia. He was an unsuccessful candidate for a seat in the Ontario assembly in 1890.
