= Duncan Graham (Canadian politician) =

Canadian politician

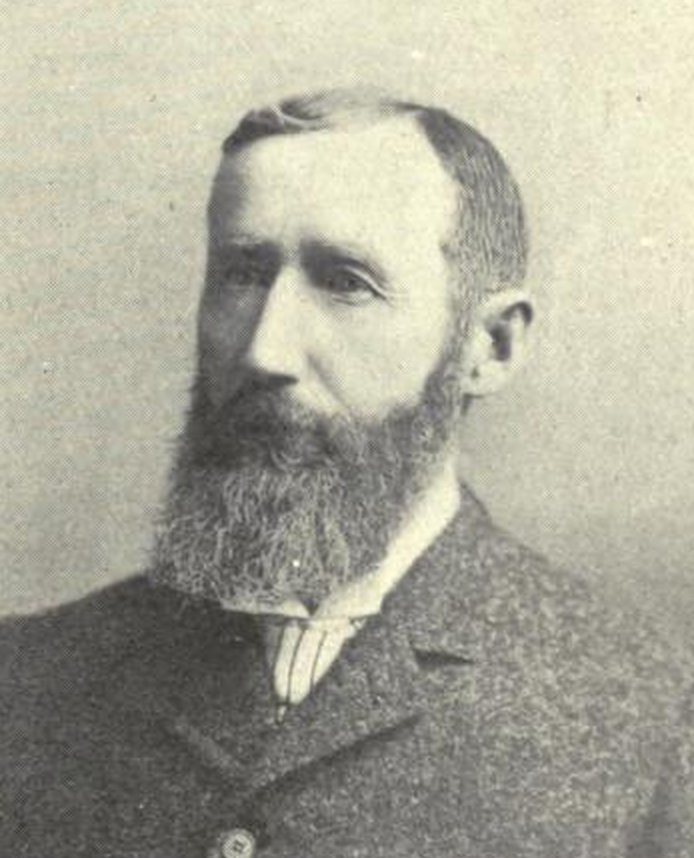

Member of the Canadian Parliament for Ontario North
- In office 1897–1900
- Preceded by: John Alexander McGillivray
- Succeeded by: Angus McLeod

Personal details
- Born: October 5, 1845 Mara Township, Canada West
- Died: February 7, 1934 (aged 88) Thorah Township, Ontario, Canada
- Party: Independent Liberal
- Occupation: farmer

Duncan Graham (October 5, 1845 – February 7, 1934) was a Canadian politician and farmer.

He was born in the township of Mara, Ontario County, Canada West, the grandson of early settlers from Scotland. A farmer, Graham was involved in local politics serving as a councillor and then deputy reeve and reeve of Mara Township. In 1896 he was Warden of Ontario County.

Graham first ran a seat in the House of Commons of Canada in the 1896 federal election as a candidate for the Patrons of Industry, a left-wing farmers' party, in the riding of Ontario North. He was defeated by a single vote by Conservative John Alexander McGillivray but the election was overturned and Graham won the February 4, 1897 by-election held in the riding and sat in parliament as an Independent Liberal. He was defeated in the 1900 federal election.

Duncan Graham died in 1934. He was buried with his parents.

== Electoral history ==
1896 Canadian federal election
Party	Candidate	Votes
Conservative	John Alexander McGillivray	2,328
Patrons of Industry	Duncan Graham	2,327

By-election on election being declared void, 4 February 1897
Party	Candidate	Votes
Independent	Duncan Graham	2,414
Conservative	Angus McLeod	2,397

1900 Canadian federal election
Party	Candidate	Votes
Conservative	Angus McLeod	2,357
Independent	Duncan Graham	1,839
