= Frank Madill (Canadian politician) =

Canadian politician

Member of Parliament for Ontario North
- In office 1887–1895
- Preceded by: Alexander Peter Cockburn
- Succeeded by: John Alexander McGillivray

Ontario MPP
- In office 1881–1883
- Preceded by: Thomas Paxton
- Succeeded by: Isaac James Gould
- Constituency: Ontario North

Personal details
- Born: November 23, 1852 Scott Township, Ontario County, Canada West
- Died: October 25, 1895 (aged 42) Beaverton, Ontario
- Party: Conservative
- Spouse: Florence Young (m. 1886)
- Occupation: Lawyer

Frank Madill (November 23, 1852 – October 25, 1895) was an Ontario lawyer and political figure. He represented Ontario North in the Legislative Assembly of Ontario from 1881 to 1883 and in the House of Commons of Canada from 1887 to 1895 as a Conservative member.

Born in Scott Township, Ontario County, Canada West in 1852, he was the son of Henry Madill, an Irish immigrant. Madill attended the University of Toronto, receiving an M.A. He went on to study law, was called to the bar in 1877 and set up practice at Beaverton. He was elected to the provincial assembly in an 1881 by-election held after Thomas Paxton was appointed sheriff for the county. In 1886, Madill married Florence Young, the daughter of the reeve of Beaverton. He ran unsuccessfully for the provincial seat in 1883 but was successful in the federal general election in 1887. Madill was a prominent member of the Freemasons. He died in office in 1895.
