= John Alexander McGillivray =

Canadian politician

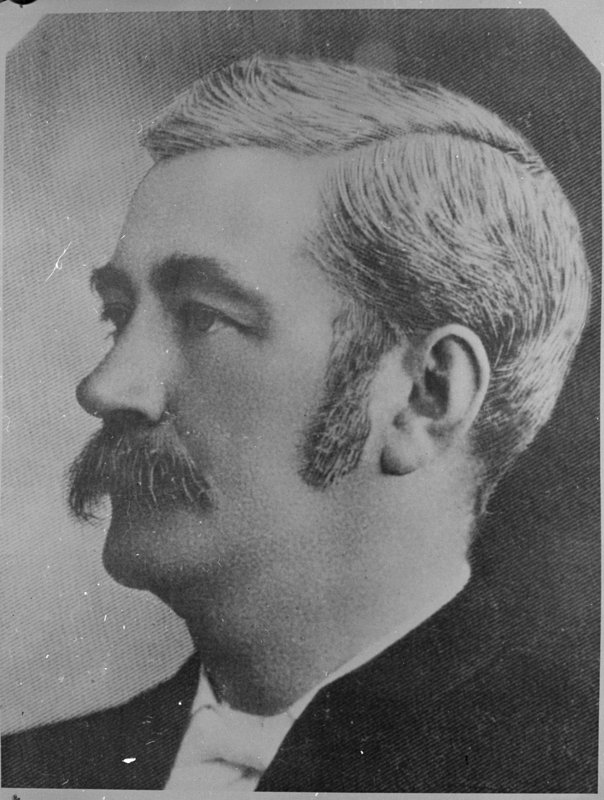

Member of the Canadian Parliament for Ontario North
- In office 12 December 1895 – 24 December 1896
- Preceded by: Frank Madill
- Succeeded by: Duncan Graham

Personal details
- Born: 4 January 1853 Pickering Township, Canada West
- Died: 14 February 1911 (aged 58)
- Party: Liberal-Conservative

John Alexander McGillivray (4 January 1853 – 14 February 1911) was a Canadian lawyer and politician.

Born in Pickering Township, Canada West, McGillivray studied law under George Young Smith in Whitby, Lyman English in Oshawa, and Jones Brothers & Mackenzie in Toronto. He started practicing law with John Billings in Port Perry and later moved to Uxbridge, Ontario. He was elected to the first council of the Town of Uxbridge in 1872 and was mayor in 1890. In 1895, he was acclaimed to the House of Commons of Canada for the riding of Ontario North after the death of the sitting MP Frank Madill. A Liberal-Conservative, he was re-elected in June 1896 winning by one vote. The election was declared void in December 1896 and he did not run in the resulting by-election. From 1902 to 1906, he was Lieutenant-Colonel of the 34th Ontario Battalion of Militia.

He died in 1911 and is buried in the Uxbridge Cemetery.
