= Adam Gordon (Canadian politician) =

Canadian politician

Adam Gordon (16 September 1831 – 28 May 1876) was a Scottish-born merchant and political figure in Ontario, Canada. He represented Ontario North in the House of Commons of Canada from 1874 to 1876 as a Liberal member.

He was born in Forfar, the son of William Gordon, and came to Whitby, Upper Canada with his family in 1838. Gordon served as deputy reeve for Mariposa Township and as deputy reeve and reeve for Reach Township. He was also postmaster for Manchester, Ontario. Gordon died in office in Port Perry at the age of 44.

1874 Canadian federal election: Ontario North
Party	Candidate	Votes
Liberal	Adam Gordon	1,804
Conservative	William Henry Gibbs	1,712
