= Thomas William Chapple =

Canadian politician

Ontario MPP
- In office 1894–1898
- Preceded by: James Glendinning
- Succeeded by: William Hoyle
- Constituency: Ontario North

Personal details
- Born: February 10, 1857 Kilkenny, Ireland
- Died: November 10, 1926 (aged 73) Rainy River, Ontario
- Party: Liberal
- Occupation: Lawyer, judge

Thomas William Chapple (February 10, 1857 – November 10, 1926) was an Ontario lawyer and political figure. He represented Ontario North in the Legislative Assembly of Ontario from 1894 to 1898 as a Liberal member.

He was born in Kilkenny, Ireland in 1853, the son of William Chapple, a captain in the British Army. He was educated in London and in Newcastle, Ontario. He was called to the Ontario bar and set up practice in Uxbridge. Chapple was named judge for the Rainy River District in 1898, serving until his death.

The township of Chapple in Rainy River District was named in his honour.
