= William Wright (Canadian politician) =

Canadian politician

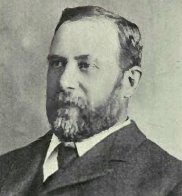

Member of Parliament for Muskoka
- In office 1904–1917
- Succeeded by: Peter McGibbon

Personal details
- Born: October 29, 1853 Egremont Township, Grey County, Canada West
- Died: January 3, 1926 (aged 72)
- Party: Conservative
- Occupation: Blacksmith, merchant

William Wright (October 29, 1853 – January 3, 1926) was a Canadian politician.

Born in Egremont Township, Grey County, Canada West, the son of David Wright, Irish, and his wife, Susanna Foster, English, Wright was educated in the Public School of Egremont. He was a blacksmith, general merchant, and a general agent. He was Councillor and Reeve of the Township of Chaffey, also Councillor and Reeve of the Town of Huntsville, Ontario. He was first elected to the House of Commons of Canada for the riding of Muskoka in the 1904 federal election. A Conservative, he was re-elected in 1908 and 1911.

A Methodist, he married Mary Elizabeth Quirt on October 23, 1878.
