= Thomas Paxton =

Canadian politician and businessman (1820–1887)

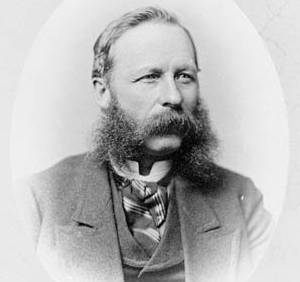

Legislative Assembly of Ontario member for Ontario North
- In office September 3, 1867 – May 10, 1881
- Preceded by: Riding established
- Succeeded by: Frank Madill

Personal details
- Born: November 27, 1820 Whitby, Upper Canada
- Died: July 3, 1887 (aged 66) Whitby, Ontario, Canada
- Party: Ontario Liberal Party
- Children: J. F. Paxton (son)
- Occupation: Businessman, sheriff

Thomas Charles Paxton (November 27, 1820 – July 3, 1887) was a Canadian politician, businessman and sheriff. As a partner in industrial business ventures, he was one of the founding fathers of Port Perry. He helped establish the first steam-powered sawmill on Lake Scugog in 1846, then later operated a flour mill and was a partner in a foundry which manufactured machinery for agriculture and mills. He turned to politics in 1854, served as the second reeve of Reach and Scugog Townships, and he was the first person to represent the Ontario North electoral district in the Legislative Assembly of Ontario. He won four elections to the provincial parliament, where he served in office from 1867 to 1881, and took interest in legislation for railways and the timber industry. He partnered with other local businessmen in 1867 to construct the Port Whitby and Port Perry Railway which was completed in 1872. He resigned from the legislature in 1881 to serve as sheriff of Ontario County until 1887, when succeeded by his son, J. F. Paxton.

== Port Perry businessman ==
Thomas Charles Paxton was born on November 27, 1820, in Whitby, the eldest son of William Paxton and Elizabeth Dryden, who had emigrated earlier that year to Upper Canada from Walsingham, England. Paxton became one of the founding fathers of Port Perry, where he settled in 1846. He was married to Eliza Huckins of Whitby on November 7, 1847.

Paxton embarked on several industrial business ventures in Port Perry. In 1846, he and his brother George Paxton established the first sawmill on Lake Scugog to be operated by a stationary steam engine. Paxton later partnered with local postmaster Joseph Bigelow, with whom he operated a flour mill for 20 years. They also became partners in the Paxton and Tate Foundry, which manufactured agricultural implements and mill machinery.

Paxton was elected reeve of Reach and Scugog Townships in 1854; he was the second person to hold the position after the townships were founded in 1853. He was a member of the Municipal Council of Ontario County, and sat on the committees for finance and assessment, and county property.

Paxton was the deputy reeve of Reach and Scugog Townships in 1856, a councillor for Reach Township in 1858, and was a grammar school trustee from 1857 to 1859, and again from 1867 to 1869. He petitioned the township council in 1867 for a license to operate a saloon in Port Perry, but the council did not have the authority to permit a saloon in a village at the time.

== Ontario legislator ==
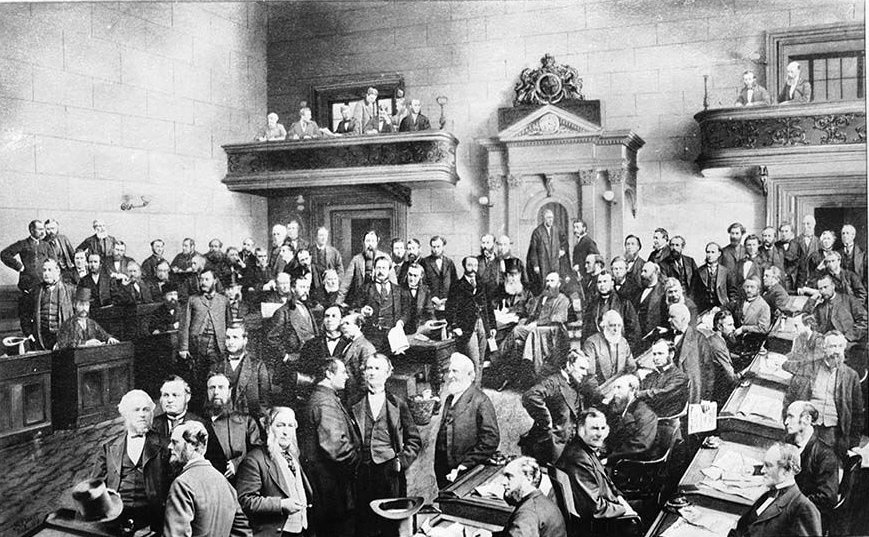
1871 session of the Legislative Assembly of Ontario

The Legislative Assembly of Ontario was established with Canadian Confederation, and Paxton became the first person to represent the Ontario North electoral district. He was elected as an Ontario Liberal Party candidate in the 1867 Ontario general election, carried through a bill for the settlement of tax titles, and served in the legislature until 1881. Throughout his entire tenure in the legislature, he was a member of the Standing Committee on Railways, the Standing Committee on Privileges and Elections, and the Standing Committee on Standing Orders.

Paxton and Bigelow began efforts in late 1867 to construct the Port Whitby and Port Perry Railway, which was chartered in March 1868. Bigelow became the railway's president and Paxton was named to its board of directors. During the 1st Parliament of Ontario, Paxton sat on a committee for Bill 89 which made provisions for the registration of brands used in marking timber, and on a committee to explore the international export of Ontario timber products.

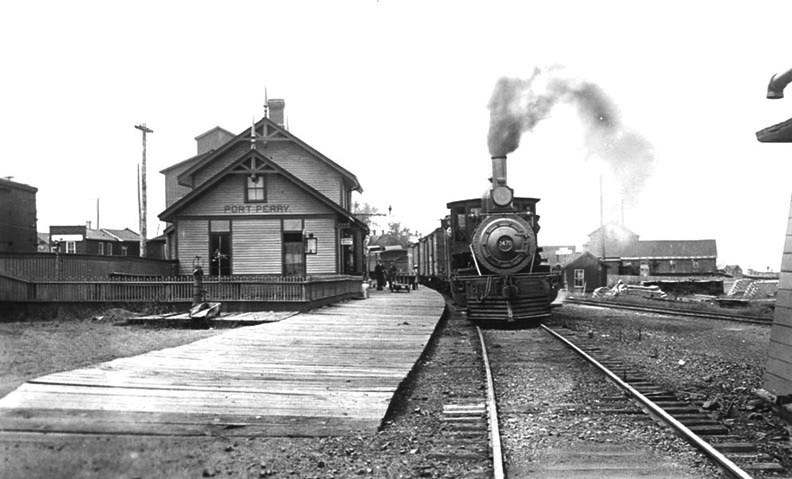
Port Perry railway station on the Port Whitby and Port Perry Railway

Paxton was returned to the legislature in the 1871 Ontario general election. During the 2nd Parliament of Ontario, he sat on a committee to study protecting Ontario's timber resources from forest fires. Construction of the Port Whitby and Port Perry Railway was completed in early 1872, and it operated as a branch line for transporting grains and other goods during a period of growth in Port Perry. During the mid-1870s, Paxton built his private residence, "Buena Vista", which was one of the largest houses in Port Perry and featured a tower and large front porch on a property of 14 acres (5.7 ha).

Paxton was returned to the legislature for a third term in the 1875 Ontario general election. The validity of many results for the 3rd Parliament of Ontario were challenged on charges of bribery or corruption. Charges were dismissed in the Ontario North electoral district but a by-election was held. Paxton won the original election by 129 votes, and won the by-election by 185 votes to retain his seat. He was appointed secretary of the Port Perry United School Section in January 1878.

Paxton was returned to the legislature for a fourth term in the 1879 Ontario general election. While serving in the 4th Parliament of Ontario, he was appointed sheriff of Ontario County upon the death of Nelson G. Reynolds in January 1881. Paxton resigned from the legislature on May 10, 1881.

== Later life and legacy ==
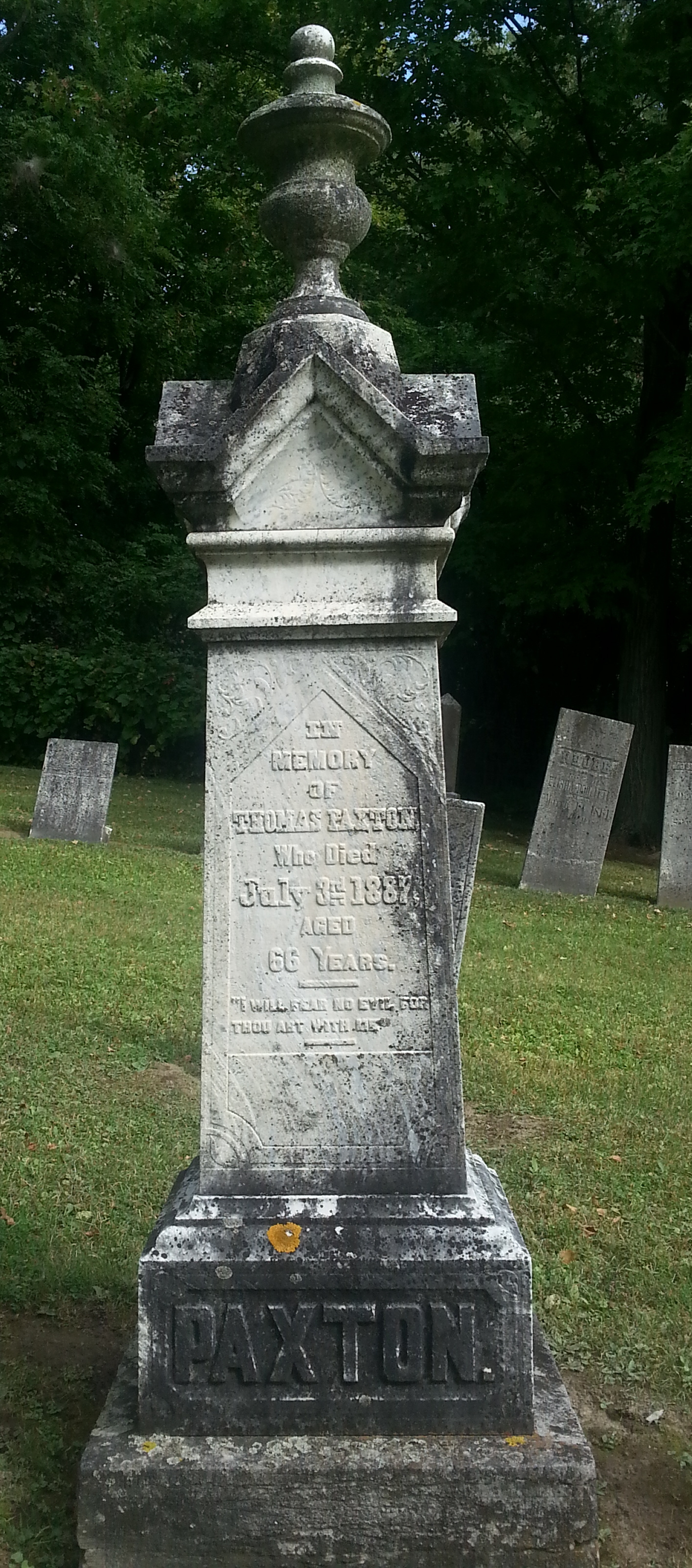
Paxton's gravestone

Paxton began serving as sheriff of Ontario County on June 20, 1881, and soon after relocated his family to Whitby. He operated an iron ore mine in Lutterworth Township which supplied foundries in Canada and the United States during the early 1880s.

Paxton died on July 3, 1887, following a lengthy illness. His funeral was well attended by people from Port Perry with many businesses closed for the day. He was interred at Dryden's burial ground – later known as the Pioneer Baptist Cemetery – in Brooklin, Ontario. His son, J. F. Paxton, was appointed to succeed him as sheriff of Ontario County.

Historian J. Peter Hvidsten opined that it was common knowledge that Paxton had too many business interests at once and entrusted too much to the decisions of others, but would have died one of the wealthiest men in Ontario County had he not put public affairs before his own business ventures.

== Electoral history ==
1867 Ontario general election: Ontario North
Party	Candidate	Votes	%
Liberal	Thomas Paxton	1,694	58.70
Conservative	Mr. Gillespie	1,192	41.30
Total valid votes		2,886	79.26
Eligible voters		3,641	
Liberal pickup new district.			
Source: Elections Ontario

1871 Ontario general election: Ontario North
Party	Candidate	Votes	%	±%
Liberal	Thomas Paxton	1,279	73.80	+15.11
Conservative	Mr. Wright	446	25.74	−15.57
Independent	Mr. Wheeler	8	0.46	
Turnout		1,733	44.11	−35.15
Eligible voters		3,929		
Liberal hold		Swing		+15.34
Source: Elections Ontario

1875 Ontario general election: Ontario North
Party	Candidate	Votes	%	±%
Liberal	Thomas Paxton	1,858	51.84	−21.96
Conservative	P. McRae	1,726	48.16	+22.42
Total valid votes		3,584	68.24	+24.13
Eligible voters		5,252		
Election voided
Source: Elections Ontario

Ontario provincial by-election, January 27, 1876: Ontario North Previous election voided
Party	Candidate	Votes	%	±%
Liberal	Thomas Paxton	1,635	53.00	−20.80
Conservative	P. McRae	1,450	47.00	+21.27
Total valid votes		3,085		
Liberal hold		Swing		−21.04
Source: History of the Electoral Districts, Legislatures and Ministries of the Province of Ontario

1879 Ontario general election: Ontario North
Party	Candidate	Votes	%	±%
Liberal	Thomas Paxton	2,244	52.21	−0.79
Conservative	Mr. Gillespie	2,054	47.79	+0.79
Total valid votes		4,298	63.85	
Eligible voters		6,731		
Liberal hold		Swing		−0.79
Source: Elections Ontario

== Sources ==
- Gibbs, Thomas N. (1854). Journal of the Proceedings and By-laws of the Municipal Council of the County of Ontario: First Session, January 1854 (PDF) (Library catalog record). Toronto, Ontario: Globe Book and Job Office.
- Mackintosh, C. H. (1877). The Canadian Parliamentary Companion and Annual Register. Ottawa, Ontario: Citizen Printing and Publishing Company – via Canadiana.org.
- Bigelow, Joseph (February 22, 1906). "Port Perry the Beautiful" (PDF). North Ontario Observer. Port Perry, Ontario.
- Farewell, John Edwin (1907). County of Ontario: Short notes as to the early settlement and progress of the county and brief references to the pioneers and some Ontario County men who have taken a prominent part in provincial and dominion affairs. Whitby, Ontario: Gazette-Chronicle Press.
- Hvidsten, J. Peter (2001). Scugog — The Early Years (PDF). Port Perry, Ontario: Observer Publishing. ISBN 0-9684932-3-8.
