= Muskoka and Parry Sound (federal electoral district) =

Former federal electoral district in Ontario, Canada

Muskoka and Parry Sound was a federal electoral district represented in the House of Commons of Canada from 1883 to 1904. It was located in the province of Ontario. This riding was created from parts of Algoma and Muskoka ridings.

It consisted of the townships of Watt, Cardwell, Humphrey, Conger, Stephenson, Brunel, Franklin, Sinclair, Chaffey, Bethune, Perry, Proud foot, Foley, Cowper, McDougall, Parry Sound Village and Island, Fergusson, Carling, Burpee, Shawanaga and settlements on the lake shore to the mouth of French River, Christie, Monteith, McKellar, Hagerman, Spence, Croft, McKenzie, Ferrie, Wilson, Mills, McConkey, Hardy, Chapman, Strong, Magnetawan, Joly, Lount, Machar, Laurier, Ryerson, Armour, McMurrich, Stisted, Pringle, Gurd, Himsworth, Nipissing, Burton, Gibson, Harrison, Wallbridge, Patterson, Blair, Mowat, and Brown, and the part of the territorial district of Muskoka lying to the south of the township of Conger and east of the townships of Medora and Wood.

The electoral district was abolished in 1903 when it was merged into a new Muskoka riding.

== Electoral history ==
1882 Canadian federal election
Party	Candidate	Votes
Conservative	O'BRIEN, William E.	1,296
Unknown	MILLER, John C.	1,293

1887 Canadian federal election
Party	Candidate	Votes
Conservative	O'BRIEN, W.E.	1,595
Liberal	MCMURRICH, W.B.	1,556

1891 Canadian federal election
Party	Candidate	Votes
Conservative	O'BRIEN, W.E.	1,916
Liberal	FITZGERALD, J.W.	1,768

1896 Canadian federal election
Party	Candidate	Votes
Liberal–Conservative	MCCORMICK, George	2,249
Liberal	PRATT, William H.	1,991
McCarthyite	O'BRIEN, William E.	1,068

1900 Canadian federal election
Party	Candidate	Votes
Liberal–Conservative	MCCORMICK, George	2,637
Liberal	WATSON, R.J.	2,515

== See also ==
- List of Canadian electoral districts
- Historical federal electoral districts of Canada
