= John Hall Thompson =

Canadian politician

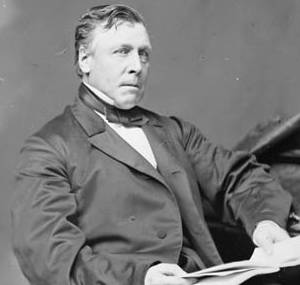
John Hall Thompson Source: Library and Archives Canada

John Hall Thompson (1810 – October 27, 1893) was a Canadian court commissioner and political figure. He represented Ontario North in the 1st Canadian Parliament as a Liberal member.

He was born in Salisbury, England, in 1810, the son of Joseph Thompson, and educated at Berwick-on-Tweed. He was reeve for Brock Township and served as warden for Ontario County in 1856–7, 1860 and 1864–5. Thompson lived in Cannington. He was elected in 1867 but defeated in the 1872 election. Thompson also served as lieutenant-colonel in the county militia from 1869 to 1880 and was commissioner in the Court of Queen's Bench.

In 1847, he married Margaret Cowan. Thompson died at Qu'Appelle Station, Saskatchewan, at the age of 83.

1867 Canadian federal election: Ontario North
Party	Candidate	Votes
Liberal	John Hall Thompson	1,628
Liberal	Matthew Crooks Cameron	1,362
Eligible voters		3,674
Source: Canadian Parliamentary Guide, 1871

1872 Canadian federal election: Ontario North
Party	Candidate	Votes
Conservative	William Henry Gibbs	1,835
Liberal	John Hall Thompson	1,620
