= George Davidson Grant =

Canadian politician

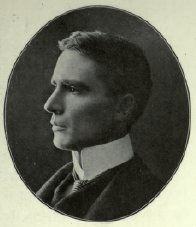

Member of the Canadian Parliament for Ontario North
- In office 1903–1908
- Preceded by: Angus McLeod
- Succeeded by: Samuel Simpson Sharpe

Personal details
- Born: June 25, 1870 Waterdown (Hamilton), Ontario
- Died: March 17, 1915 (aged 44)
- Party: Liberal

George Davidson Grant (June 25, 1870 – March 17, 1915) was a Canadian politician.

Born in Waterdown, Ontario, the son of Rev. Robert N. Grant, D.D., Scotch, and Marian E. McMullen, Irish, Grant educated at Common Schools, the Collegiate Institute and Osgoode Hall Law School in Toronto. A lawyer, was first elected to the Canadian House of Commons for the electoral district of Ontario North in a 1903 by-election held after the death of the sitting MP, Angus McLeod. A Liberal, he was re-elected again in 1904 and was defeated in 1908.

By-election on Mr. McLeod's death, 10 March 1903
Party	Candidate	Votes
Liberal	George D. Grant	2,465
Independent	G. E. Foster	2,265

1904 Canadian federal election: Ontario North
Party	Candidate	Votes
Liberal	George D. Grant	2,161
Conservative	George A. Proctor	2,023

1908 Canadian federal election: Ontario North
Party	Candidate	Votes
Conservative	Samuel S. Sharpe	2,208
Liberal	George Davidson Grant	2,008
