= James Blanchard (Canadian politician) =

Canadian politician

Ontario MPP
- In office 1929–1934
- Preceded by: John Wesley Widdifield
- Succeeded by: Riding abolished
- Constituency: Ontario North

Personal details
- Born: January 8, 1876 Leaskdale, Ontario
- Died: July 17, 1952 (aged 76) Scott, Ontario
- Party: Conservative
- Spouse: Zella Beatrice Murray (m. 1900)
- Occupation: Farmer

James Blanchard (January 8, 1876 – July 17, 1952) was a farmer and political figure in Ontario. He represented Ontario North in the Legislative Assembly of Ontario from 1929 to 1934 as a Conservative member.

He was born in Leaskdale, the son of John Blanchard and Melissa Edwards, and was educated there. In 1900, he married Zella Beatrice Murray. Blanchard served on the municipal and city councils and also served as reeve. He died July 17, 1952.
