= Muskoka—Ontario (federal electoral district) =

Former federal electoral district in Ontario, Canada

Ontario electoral district

Defunct federal electoral district
- Legislature: House of Commons
- District created: 1924
- District abolished: 1947
- First contested: 1925
- Last contested: 1945

Muskoka—Ontario was a federal electoral district represented in the House of Commons of Canada from 1925 to 1949. It was located in the province of Ontario. This riding was created in 1924 from parts of Muskoka and Ontario North ridings.

It initially consisted of the territorial district of Muskoka and the part of the county of Ontario lying north of and including the township of Uxbridge and north of but excluding the township of Reach.

The electoral district was abolished in 1947 when it was redistributed between Ontario, Parry Sound-Muskoka, Simcoe East and Victoria ridings.

== Members of Parliament ==
This riding elected the following members of the House of Commons of Canada:

Parliament	Years	Member	Party
Riding created from Muskoka and Ontario North
15th	1925–1926	Peter McGibbon	Conservative
16th	1926–1930	Peter McGibbon	Conservative
17th	1930–1935	Peter McGibbon	Conservative
18th	1935–1940	Stephen Furniss	Liberal
19th	1940–1945	Stephen Furniss	Liberal
20th	1945–1949	James Macdonnell	Progressive Conservative
Ridings dissolved into Parry Sound-Muskoka, Ontario, Simcoe East and Victoria

== Election results ==
1925 Canadian federal election
Party	Candidate	Votes
Conservative	Peter McGibbon	9,184
Progressive	Robert Henry Halbert	5,608

1926 Canadian federal election
Party	Candidate	Votes
Conservative	Peter McGibbon	9,039
Progressive	John Benjamin Johnston	5,757

1930 Canadian federal election
Party	Candidate	Votes
Conservative	Peter McGibbon	8,828
Liberal	James Dean MacDonald	5,880

1935 Canadian federal election
Party	Candidate	Votes
Liberal	Stephen Furniss	8,183
Conservative	Peter McGibbon	7,326
Reconstruction	Harmon Edmund Rice	1,215
Co-operative Commonwealth	Arthur Shipman	614

1940 Canadian federal election
Party	Candidate	Votes
Liberal	Stephen Furniss	8,098
National Government	Norman Everrit Prowse	7,016

1945 Canadian federal election
Party	Candidate	Votes
Progressive Conservative	James Macdonnell	8,531
Liberal	George Clifford Panter	7,762

== See also ==
- List of Canadian electoral districts
- Historical federal electoral districts of Canada
