= William Hoyle (politician) =

Canadian politician

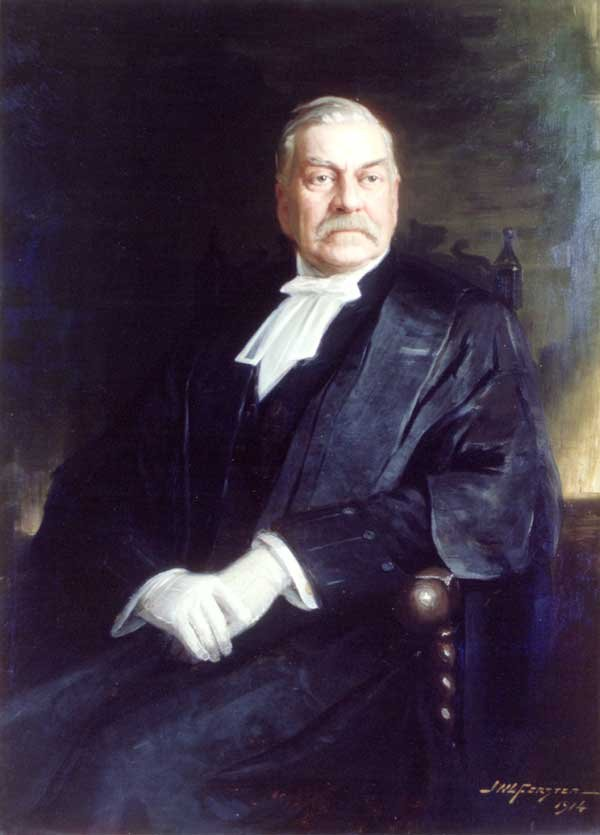

Ontario MPP
- In office 1898–1918
- Preceded by: Thomas William Chapple
- Succeeded by: John Wesley Widdifield
- Constituency: Ontario North

13th Speaker of the Legislative Assembly of Ontario
- In office 1912–1914
- Preceded by: Thomas Crawford
- Succeeded by: David Jamieson

Personal details
- Born: August 28, 1842 Port of Barnstaple, Devonshire, England
- Died: October 27, 1918 (aged 76) Toronto, Ontario
- Party: Conservative
- Occupation: Furniture maker

William Henry Hoyle (August 28, 1842 – October 27, 1918) was an English-born furniture maker and politician in Ontario, Canada. He was speaker of the Legislative Assembly of Ontario from 1912 to 1914 and served as Conservative MLA for Ontario North from 1898 to 1918.

He was born in Barnstaple, Devonshire, was educated there and emigrated to Canada soon afterwards. Hoyle settled in Cannington, Ontario, where he worked as a cabinet maker and upholsterer. Hoyle served on the Cannington School Board, also serving as secretary treasurer. In 1895, he became reeve of Cannington. He helped found All Saint's Anglican Church and served as Grand Master of the Orange Order in Ontario (1898) and Grand Master of the local International Order of Oddfellows. Hoyle died in office in 1918.
