= Ontario North (provincial electoral district) =

Ontario electoral district

Defunct provincial electoral district
- Legislature: Legislative Assembly of Ontario
- District created: 1867
- District abolished: 1933
- First contested: 1867
- Last contested: 1929

Ontario North was an electoral riding in Ontario, Canada. It was created in 1867 at the time of confederation and was abolished in 1933 before the 1934 election.

== Members of Provincial Parliament ==
Ontario North
Assembly	Years	Member	Party
1st	1867–1871	Thomas Paxton	Liberal
2nd	1871–1874	Thomas Paxton	Liberal
3rd	1875–1879	Thomas Paxton	Liberal
4th	1879–1881	Thomas Paxton	Liberal
4th	1881–1883	Frank Madill	Conservative
5th	1883–1886	Isaac James Gould	Liberal
6th	1886–1890	Isaac James Gould	Liberal
7th	1890–1894	James Glendinning	Conservative
8th	1894–1898	Thomas William Chapple	Liberal
9th	1898–1902	William Hoyle	Conservative
10th	1902–1904	William Hoyle	Conservative
11th	1905–1908	William Hoyle	Conservative
12th	1908–1911	William Hoyle	Conservative
13th	1911–1914	William Hoyle	Conservative
14th	1914–1918	William Hoyle	Conservative
14th	1919–1919	John Wesley Widdifield	United Farmers
15th	1919–1923	John Wesley Widdifield	United Farmers
16th	1923–1926	John Wesley Widdifield	United Farmers
17th	1926–1929	John Wesley Widdifield	United Farmers
18th	1929–1934	James Blanchard	Conservative
Sourced from the Ontario Legislative Assembly
Merged into Ontario before the 1934 election

== Election results ==
1929 Ontario general election
Party	Candidate	Votes	%	±%
Conservative	James Blanchard	3,072	47.33	+2.92
Progressive	John Wesley Widdifield	2,196	33.84	–21.75
Liberal	George Veale	1,222	18.83	–
Total valid votes		6,490	99.28	
Total rejected ballots		47	0.72	+0.25
Turnout		6,537	71.69	–3.33
Eligible voters		9,118		
Conservative gain from Progressive		Swing		+12.33
Source: Elections Ontario

1926 Ontario general election
Party	Candidate	Votes	%	±%
Progressive	John Wesley Widdifield	3,878	55.58	+4.97
Conservative	Thomas Daniel Bell	3,099	44.42	–4.97
Total valid votes		6,977	99.53	
Total rejected ballots		33	0.47	–0.01
Turnout		7,010	75.02	+6.28
Eligible voters		9,344		
Progressive hold		Swing		+4.97
Source: Elections Ontario

1923 Ontario general election
Party	Candidate	Votes	%	±%
United Farmers	John Wesley Widdifield	3,330	50.61	–3.51
Conservative	David Watson Walls	3,250	49.39	+3.51
Total valid votes		6,580	99.52	
Total rejected ballots		32	0.48	–1.82
Turnout		6,612	68.75	–11.94
Eligible voters		9,618		
United Farmers hold		Swing		–3.51
Source: Elections Ontario

1919 Ontario general election
Party	Candidate	Votes	%	±%
United Farmers	John Wesley Widdifield	4,162	54.12	+1.33
Conservative	John Wetherall	3,529	45.88	–1.33
Total valid votes		7,691	97.70	
Total rejected ballots		181	2.30	+2.30
Turnout		7,872	80.69	–
Eligible voters		9,756		
United Farmers hold		Swing		+1.33
Source: Elections Ontario

Ontario provincial by-election, February 18, 1919 Death of William Hoyle
Party	Candidate	Votes	%	±%
United Farmers	John Wesley Widdifield	3,965	52.78	+6.92
Conservative	Harry Cameron	3,547	47.22	–6.92
Total valid votes		7,512	100.00	
Total rejected ballots		–		
Turnout		7,512	–	–
Eligible voters				
United Farmers gain from Conservative		Swing		–
Source: Elections Ontario

1914 Ontario general election
Party	Candidate	Votes	%	±%
Conservative	William Hoyle	1,877	54.14	–3.07
Liberal	John Wesley Widdifield	1,590	45.86	+3.07
Total valid votes		3,467	99.66	
Total rejected ballots		12	0.34	–0.29
Turnout		3,479	96.24	+22.47
Eligible voters		3,615		
Conservative hold		Swing		–3.07
Source: Elections Ontario

1911 Ontario general election
Party	Candidate	Votes	%	±%
Conservative	William Hoyle	1,971	57.21	+1.59
Liberal	Peter McMillan	1,474	42.79	–1.59
Total valid votes		3,445	99.37	
Total rejected ballots		22	0.63	+0.34
Turnout		3,467	73.77	–11.62
Eligible voters		4,700		
Conservative hold		Swing		+1.59
Source: Elections Ontario

1908 Ontario general election
Party	Candidate	Votes	%	±%
Conservative	William Hoyle	2,230	55.62	+3.53
Liberal	William J. Kester	1,779	44.38	–3.53
Total valid votes		4,009	99.70	
Total rejected ballots		12	0.30	–0.02
Turnout		4,021	85.39	+0.07
Eligible voters		4,709		
Conservative hold		Swing		+3.53
Source: Elections Ontario

1905 Ontario general election
Party	Candidate	Votes	%	±%
Conservative	William Hoyle	2,258	52.10	–0.08
Liberal	George Thomson	2,076	47.90	+0.08
Total valid votes		4,334	99.68	
Total rejected ballots		14	0.32	+0.23
Turnout		4,348	85.32	+3.12
Eligible voters		5,096		
Conservative hold		Swing		–0.08
Source: Elections Ontario

1902 Ontario general election
Party	Candidate	Votes	%	±%
Conservative	William Hoyle	2,219	52.17	–2.93
Liberal	Mr. Hester	2,034	47.83	+2.93
Total valid votes		4,253	99.91	
Total rejected ballots		4	0.09	+0.09
Turnout		4,257	82.20	–13.73
Eligible voters		5,179		
Conservative hold		Swing		–2.93
Source: Elections Ontario

1898 Ontario general election
Party	Candidate	Votes	%	±%
Conservative	William Hoyle	2,326	55.11	+6.01
Liberal	Thomas William Chapple	1,895	44.89	–6.01
Total valid votes		4,221	100.00	
Total rejected ballots		–		
Turnout		4,221	95.93	+16.48
Eligible voters		4,400		
Conservative gain from Liberal		Swing		+6.01
Source: Elections Ontario

1894 Ontario general election
Party	Candidate	Votes	%	±%
Liberal	Thomas William Chapple	2,114	50.90	+1.97
Conservative	James Glendinning	2,039	49.10	–1.97
Total valid votes		4,153	99.64	
Total rejected ballots		15	0.36	–0.13
Turnout		4,168	79.45	+9.07
Eligible voters		5,246		
Liberal gain from Conservative		Swing		+1.97
Source: Elections Ontario

1890 Ontario general election
Party	Candidate	Votes	%	±%
Conservative	James Glendinning	1,869	51.07	+2.93
Liberal	Isaac James Gould	1,791	48.93	–2.93
Total valid votes		3,660	99.51	
Total rejected ballots		18	0.49	+0.10
Turnout		3,678	70.38	–2.51
Eligible voters		5,226		
Conservative gain from Liberal		Swing		+2.93
Source: Elections Ontario

1886 Ontario general election
Party	Candidate	Votes	%	±%
Liberal	Isaac James Gould	2,006	51.86	+1.61
Conservative	John Alexander McGillivray	1,862	48.14	–1.61
Total valid votes		3,868	99.61	
Total rejected ballots		15	0.39	–0.09
Turnout		3,883	72.89	–0.22
Eligible voters		5,327		
Liberal hold		Swing		+1.61
Source: Elections Ontario

1883 Ontario general election
Party	Candidate	Votes	%	±%
Liberal	Isaac James Gould	2,412	50.25	+0.83
Conservative	Frank Madill	2,388	49.75	–0.83
Total valid votes		4,800	99.52	
Total rejected ballots		23	0.48	+0.48
Turnout		4,823	73.11	–
Eligible voters		6,597		
Liberal gain from Conservative		Swing		+0.83
Source: Elections Ontario

Ontario provincial by-election, June 4, 1881 Resignation of Thomas Paxton to become Sheriff of Ontario County
Party	Candidate	Votes	%	±%
Conservative	Frank Madill	2,094	50.58	+2.79
Liberal	N.F. Bigelow	2,046	49.42	–2.79
Total valid votes		4,140	100.00	
Total rejected ballots		–		
Turnout		4,140	–	–
Eligible voters				
Conservative gain from Liberal		Swing		+2.79
Source: Elections Ontario

1879 Ontario general election
Party	Candidate	Votes	%	±%
Liberal	Thomas Paxton	2,244	52.21	−0.79
Conservative	Mr. Gillespie	2,054	47.79	+0.79
Total valid votes		4,298	63.85	
Eligible voters		6,731		
Liberal hold		Swing		−0.79
Source: Elections Ontario

Ontario provincial by-election, January 27, 1876 Previous election voided
Party	Candidate	Votes	%	±%
Liberal	Thomas Paxton	1,635	53.00	−20.80
Conservative	P. McRae	1,450	47.00	+21.27
Total valid votes		3,085		
Liberal hold		Swing		−21.04
Source: History of the Electoral Districts, Legislatures and Ministries of the Province of Ontario

1875 Ontario general election
Party	Candidate	Votes	%	±%
Liberal	Thomas Paxton	1,858	51.84	−21.96
Conservative	P. McRae	1,726	48.16	+22.42
Total valid votes		3,584	68.24	+24.13
Eligible voters		5,252		
Election voided
Source: Elections Ontario

1871 Ontario general election
Party	Candidate	Votes	%	±%
Liberal	Thomas Paxton	1,279	73.80	+15.11
Conservative	Mr. Wright	446	25.74	−15.57
Independent	Mr. Wheeler	8	0.46	
Turnout		1,733	44.11	−35.15
Eligible voters		3,929		
Liberal hold		Swing		+15.34
Source: Elections Ontario

1867 Ontario general election
Party	Candidate	Votes	%
Liberal	Thomas Paxton	1,694	58.70
Conservative	Mr. Gillespie	1,192	41.30
Total valid votes		2,886	79.26
Eligible voters		3,641	
Liberal pickup new district.			
Source: Elections Ontario
