= Town Hall 1873 Centre for the Performing Arts =

Theatre in Toronto, Canada

- Interactive map of Town Hall 1873 Centre for the Performing Arts
- Location: Port Perry, Ontario
- Coordinates: 44°06′12″N 78°56′50″W
- Owner: Township of Scugog
- Capacity: 234

Construction
- Built: 1873
- Opened: 1973 (as a theatre)
- Renovated: 2004, 2026

Website
- townhalltheatre.ca

The Town Hall 1873 Centre for the Performing Arts, commonly known as the Town Hall 1873, is a performing arts theatre in Port Perry, Ontario, Canada. The theatre is located at 302 Queen Street and has approximately 234 seats.

== History ==
Built in 1873, the Town Hall Theatre was originally the Township Office, jail and court house. It was later used as a theatre, roller skating rink, movie house, fire station and ladies undergarment factory.

In 1973 a group of residents persuaded the Township Council to lease the abandoned building for 99 years at $1 a year rather than destroy it for a parking lot, and the Town Hall was again converted to a theatre. A stage was added, but otherwise the hall retained its original state for nearly three decades.

In 2022 the Town Hall received funding from the Government of Ontario to help complete renovations to improve the accessibility, sustainability and resiliency of the building. The cost of the project is roughly 1 million dollars, and is estimated to be completed in 2026.
