= Ontario West =

Former federal electoral district in Ontario, Canada

Ontario West was a federal electoral district represented in the House of Commons of Canada from 1882 to 1904. It was located in the province of Ontario. It was created from parts of Ontario North, Ontario South and York North ridings.

The West Riding of the county of Ontario consisted of the townships of Whitchurch, Uxbridge and Pickering, the town of Newmarket, the village of Uxbridge and the village of Stouffville.

The electoral district was abolished in 1903 when it was redistributed between the three ridings from which it had been created.

== Electoral history ==
1882 Canadian federal election: West Riding of Ontario
Party	Candidate	Votes
Liberal	WHELER, George	1,793
Unknown	MAJOR, Ed.	1,035

By-election: On Mr. Wheler's resignation, 22 August 1884: West Riding of Ontario
Party	Candidate	Votes
Liberal	EDGAR, James David	acclaimed

1887 Canadian federal election: West Riding of Ontario
Party	Candidate	Votes
Liberal	EDGAR, Jas. D.	1,900
Conservative	MILLER, John	1,301

1891 Canadian federal election: West Riding of Ontario
Party	Candidate	Votes
Liberal	EDGAR, Jas. D.	1,867
Conservative	WHITE, F.P.	868

1896 Canadian federal election: West Riding of Ontario
Party	Candidate	Votes
Liberal	EDGAR, Hon. J.D.	1,832
Conservative	MCCORMACK, W.A.	1,093

By-election: On Mr. Edgar's death, 18 January 1900: West Riding of Ontario
Party	Candidate	Votes
Liberal	GOULD, I.J.	acclaimed

1900 Canadian federal election: West Riding of Ontario
Party	Candidate	Votes
Liberal	GOULD, Isaac James	1,740
Conservative	ROCHE, Francis J.	1,231

== See also ==
- List of Canadian electoral districts
- Historical federal electoral districts of Canada
