= John Wesley Widdifield =

Canadian politician (1869–1943)

Ontario MPP
- In office 1919–1929
- Preceded by: William Hoyle
- Succeeded by: James Blanchard
- Constituency: Ontario North

Personal details
- Born: March 16, 1869 Uxbridge Township, Ontario
- Died: October 14, 1943 (aged 74) Uxbridge Township, Ontario
- Party: United Farmers of Ontario
- Spouse: Lucy Dike (m. 1895)
- Occupation: Farmer

John Wesley Widdifield (March 16, 1869 – October 14, 1943) was an Ontario political figure. He represented Ontario North as a Liberal member from 1919 to 1929.

He was born in Uxbridge Township, the son of Warren Playter Widdifield. He was educated in Uxbridge and at the Ontario Agricultural College in Guelph, later receiving a degree from Toronto University. In 1895, he married Lucy Dike. Widdifield also served as reeve for Uxbridge. He was first elected as a United Farmers candidate in a by-election held in the spring of 1919 but was elected as a Liberal in 1919, 1923 and 1926. He died in 1943 when he was stricken while he was driving to the funeral of a friend at his hometown of Uxbridge.
