= Scott Township, Ontario =

Coordinates: 44°11′19″N 79°13′46″W

Scott, Ontario is a geographic township and former municipality now part of the Township of Uxbridge.

The Township was surveyed in 1807 and was named for Thomas Scott (1746–1824), an Attorney-General and Chief Justice for Upper Canada. Scott Township was incorporated in 1850 and a Township hall was built in 1860.

Scott Township was amalgamated with the Town and Township of Uxbridge to form an expanded Township of Uxbridge in 1974.

Communities in the former territory of Scott include Leaskdale, Sandford, Udora and Zephyr.

Leaskdale Manse, the former home of L. M. Montgomery, the author of Anne of Green Gables is located in the Township at Leaskdale. Montgomery lived in the area from 1911 to 1926, and wrote several books during that time. The Manse was designated a National Historic Site of Canada in 1996.

== See also ==
- List of townships in Ontario
