= Robert Henry Halbert =

Canadian politician

Robert Henry Halbert (October 31, 1870 – October 11, 1943) was a Canadian agrarian activist and politician. He was president of the United Farmers of Ontario from 1915 to 1918 and was elected to the House of Commons of Canada in a 1919 by-election as an independent candidate in Ontario North. He was re-elected in the 1921 federal election as a United Farmers of Ontario MP and subsequently joined the caucus of the Progressive Party of Canada. He was defeated in the 1925 federal election in Muskoka—Ontario.

By-election on Mr. Sharpe's death, 9 December 1919
Party	Candidate	Votes
Independent	Robert Henry Halbert	3,662
Progressive	Neil D. Mackinnon	3,477

1921 Canadian federal election: Ontario North
Party	Candidate	Votes
Progressive	Robert Henry Halbert	3,919
Conservative	Neil Donald McKinnon	3,772
