= George Wheler (politician) =

Canadian politician

George Wheler (September 2, 1836 – July 6, 1908) was a mill owner and political figure in Ontario, Canada. He represented Ontario North from 1878 to 1882 and Ontario West from 1882 to 1884 as a Liberal member.

He was born in Markham, Upper Canada, the son of Edward Wheler, who came from Devonshire, England, and Anna Maria Reesor. Wheler was educated in Toronto and at Victoria College in Cobourg. In 1861, he married Harriet Hamilton. Wheler was reeve for Uxbridge and warden for Ontario County. He served as postmaster of Uxbridge from 1865 to 1874. He was unseated in 1880 after an appeal but won the by-election held later that same year. Wheler resigned his seat in 1884.

1878 Canadian federal election: Ontario North
Party	Candidate	Votes
Liberal	George Wheler	2,215
Conservative	William Henry Gibbs	2,161

By-election on Mr. Wheeler being unseated on petition, 28 August 1880
Party	Candidate	Votes
Liberal	George Wheler	2,271
Conservative	William Henry Gibbs	2,113
