= William Henry Gibbs =

Canadian politician

William Henry Gibbs (29 November 1823 – 5 November 1902) was a manufacturer and political figure in Ontario, Canada. He represented Ontario North in the House of Commons of Canada as a Conservative member from 1872 to 1874 and from 1876 to 1878.

He was born in Terrebonne, Lower Canada, the son of Thomas Gibbs and Caroline Tate who had gone there from Devonshire, England in 1819. He was educated in Montreal. With his brother Thomas Nicholson, he built a grist mill south of Oshawa. The two brothers built other mills and also operated a distillery and a tannery. Gibbs was also president of the Oshawa Cabinet Company. He served on the town council for Oshawa, also serving as reeve and later mayor. He was also deputy reeve for Whitby Township and warden for Ontario County. In 1845, he married Frances Colton.

Gibbs was defeated by Adam Gordon for the federal seat in 1874. Gibbs was reelected in an 1876 by-election held after Gordon's death. After his defeat by George Wheler in 1878, he made two more unsuccessful bids for reelection in 1880 and 1882. He died in Toronto at the age of 78.

1872 Canadian federal election: Ontario North
Party	Candidate	Votes
Conservative	William Henry Gibbs	1,835
Liberal	John Hall Thompson	1,620

1874 Canadian federal election: Ontario North
Party	Candidate	Votes
Liberal	Adam Gordon	1,804
Conservative	William Henry Gibbs	1,712

By-election on Mr. Gordon's death, July 1876
Party	Candidate	Votes
Conservative	William Henry Gibbs	1,891
Independent	George Currie	1,804

1878 Canadian federal election: Ontario North
Party	Candidate	Votes
Liberal	George Wheler	2,215
Conservative	William Henry Gibbs	2,161

By-election on Mr. Wheeler being unseated on petition, 28 August 1880
Party	Candidate	Votes
Liberal	George Wheler	2,271
Conservative	William Henry Gibbs	2,113
