= Joseph Gould (Canada West politician) =

Canadian politician (1808–1886)

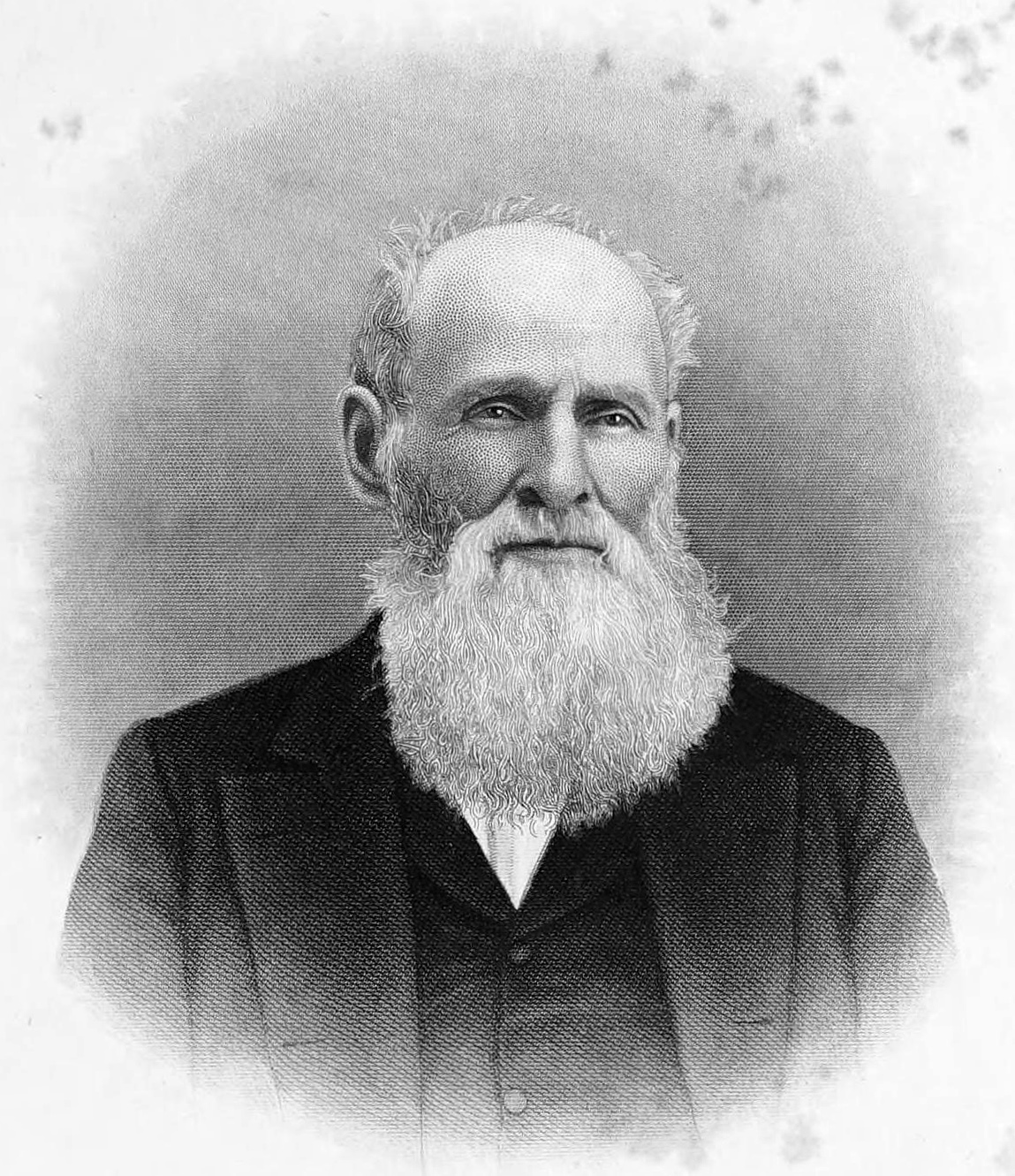
Gould in an 1880 engraving

Joseph Gould (December 29, 1808 – January 29, 1886) was a farmer, businessman and political figure in Ontario, Canada.

== Early life ==
He was born in Uxbridge Township, Upper Canada in 1808, the son of Quakers who had come from Pennsylvania after the American Revolution. He bought a farm and sawmill there. He became interested in the Reform movement of William Lyon Mackenzie and took part in the Upper Canada Rebellion.

Gould was captured and sentenced to be exiled to Van Diemen's Land but his sentence was reduced to 9 months in prison. He was pardoned as part of a general amnesty in 1838.

== Career ==
After his release, his farm prospered; he also owned mills and factories and operated the Whitby, Lake Scugog, Simcoe and Huron Road. He also promoted the development of railway links in the region. Gould served on the district council from 1842 to 1854 and became the first reeve of Uxbridge Township and the first warden for Ontario County. He was elected to the Legislative Assembly for the North Riding of Ontario in 1854 and 1857; he was defeated in 1861. While in office, he helped pass measures to abolish seigneurial tenure and secularize the clergy reserves.

== Later life and death ==
After he left politics, he helped other members in his community by supporting the building of churches and primary schools. Having received very little schooling himself, he did not believe in higher education.

He died in Uxbridge in 1886.

== Legacy ==
His son Isaac James later served as a member of the legislative assembly for the province of Ontario and in the federal parliament. His daughter Alma Gould Dale was a founding member of the Quakers in western Canada.
