= William James Hammell =

Canadian politician

Member of Parliament for Muskoka
- In office December 1921 – September 1925

Personal details
- Born: William James Hammell; 28 June 1881 Raymond, Ontario, Canada
- Died: 4 December 1959 (aged 78) Muskoka Lakes, Ontario, Canada
- Party: Progressive; Liberal
- Spouse(s): Nellie Code m. 29 Jun 1912
- Profession: farmer

William James Hammell (28 June 1881 – 4 December 1959) was a Canadian politician and farmer who was a Progressive party then Liberal member of the House of Commons of Canada.

== Biography ==
He was born in Raymond, Ontario and became a farmer.

He was first elected to Parliament at the Muskoka riding in the 1921 general election as a Progressive candidate. In 1922, his party allegiance switched to the Liberals. After completing his only term in the House of Commons, the 14th Canadian Parliament, Hammell left federal politics and did not seek re-election in the 1925 vote.

William James Hammell died in 1959 and was buried at Ullswater-North Cemetery in Ullswater, Ontario. His wife died in 1973 and was buried next to him.
