= Stephen Furniss =

Canadian politician

Member of Parliament for Muskoka—Ontario
- In office October 1935 – April 1945

Personal details
- Born: Stephen Joseph Furniss; 8 May 1875 Mara Township, Ontario, Canada
- Died: 2 September 1952 (aged 77)
- Party: Liberal
- Spouse(s): Margaret Helen Waddell m. 5 February 1896
- Profession: farmer

Stephen Joseph Furniss (8 May 1875 – 2 September 1952) was a Liberal party member of the House of Commons of Canada. He was born in Mara Township, Ontario and became a farmer by career.

Furniss's ancestors were originators of the Furniss Steamship Lines. He attended school in Mara Township then at Ontario Business College.

He was first elected to Parliament at the Muskoka—Ontario riding in the 1935 general election then re-elected in 1940. Furniss did not seek re-election in the 1945 election after completing his second term, the 19th Canadian Parliament.
