= Port Perry =

Community in Scugog, Ontario, Canada

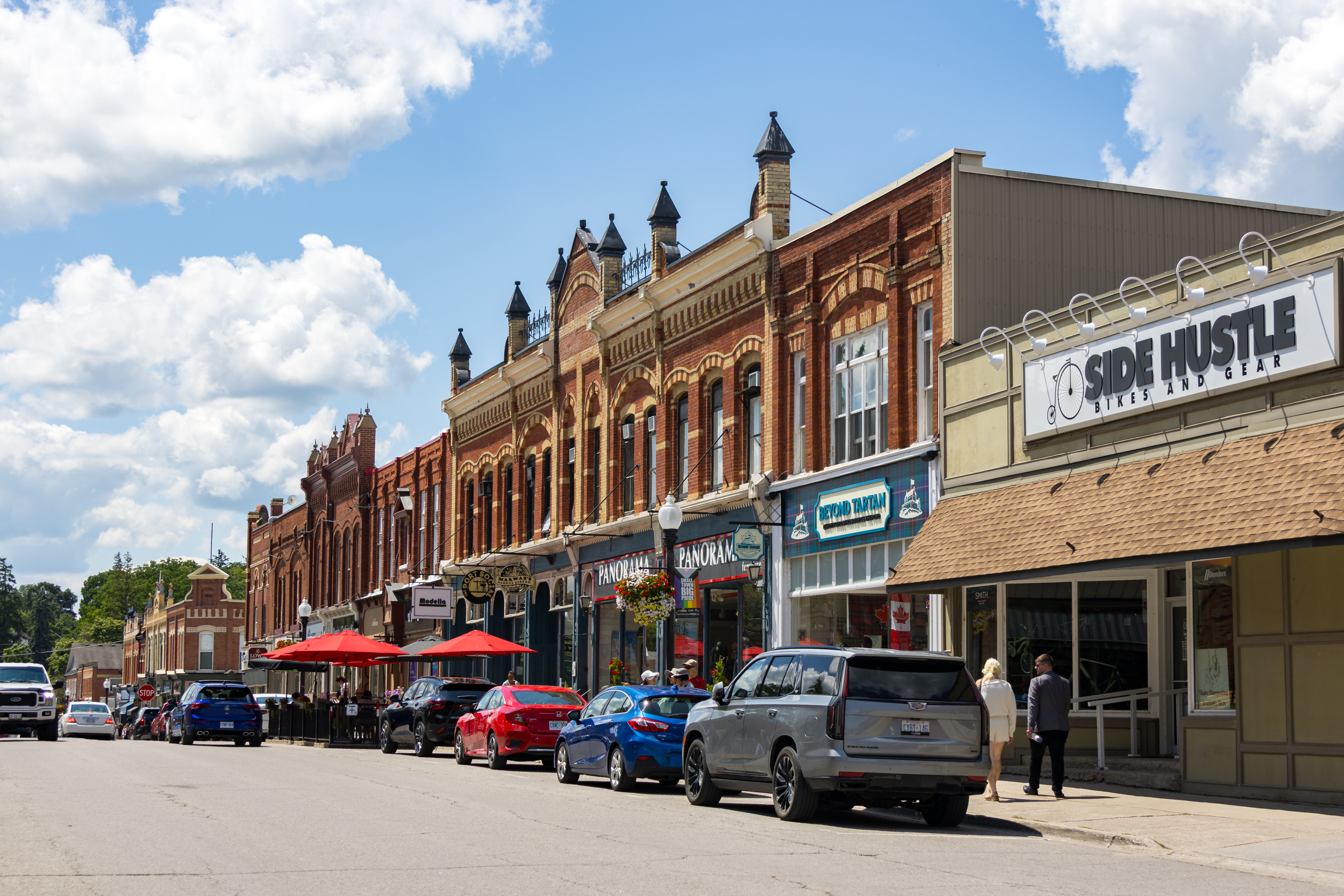
- Queen Street in Downtown Port Perry

- Location within Regional Municipality of Durham Location within Southern Ontario
- Coordinates: 44°06′17″N 78°56′39″W
- Country: Canada
- Province: Ontario
- Regional municipality: Durham
- Township: Scugog
- Settled: 1821
- Incorporated (village): 1871

Population (2021)
  - Total: 9,553
- Time zone: UTC−5 (EST)
  - Summer (DST): UTC−4 (EDT)
- Forward sortation area: L9L
- Area codes: 905 and 289
- NTS Map: 31D2 Scugog
- GNBC Code: FCIAS

Port Perry is a community located in Scugog, Ontario, Canada. The town is located 84 kilometres (52 mi) northeast of central Toronto, north of Oshawa, and east of Whitby. Port Perry has a population of 9,553 as of 2021. Port Perry serves as the administrative and commercial centre for the township of Scugog. The town is home to a 24-bed hospital (Lakeridge Health Port Perry), Scugog Township's municipal offices and many retail establishments. Port Perry serves as a hub for many small communities in the Scugog area, such as Greenbank, Raglan, Caesarea, Blackstock and Nestleton/Nestleton Station. The Great Blue Heron Charitable Casino is a major employer. Located at the basin of the Trent-Severn Waterways is Lake Scugog, one of Ontario's largest man-made lakes.

== History ==
The area around Port Perry was first surveyed as part of Reach Township by Major Samuel Street Wilmot in 1809. The first settler in the area was Reuben Crandell, a United Empire Loyalist who built a homestead with his wife in May 1821. Their original home is still in use and can be seen on King Street between Prince Albert and Manchester. In November 1821, Lucy Ann Crandell became the first child of European descent born in the area. In 1831, Crandell and his family moved to a homestead at what became Crandell's Corners (later called Borelia). It had its own Post Office, near the present-day junction of Queen Street and Highway 7A.

Settler Peter Perry laid out village lots on the shore of Lake Scugog in 1848 on the site of a former native village known as Scugog Village. The townsite was named Port Perry in 1852 and its first Postmaster was Joseph Bigelow. It was incorporated as a village in 1871. At the time there was an intense rivalry between Port Perry and two nearby towns, Prince Albert and Manchester. Expecting great things for "his" town, Peter Perry predicted that goats would eat grass off of Prince Albert's main street.

At the time, Prince Albert sat astride a planked toll road running south to Whitby. Grain and lumber from areas throughout the area south-east of Lake Simcoe fed through Prince Albert, which was a major grain trading area. Perry and others in Port Perry felt a railway was a much better option, and Perry's prediction would eventually come true.

A group of local businessmen started the process of bringing the railway to the town in 1867, and the first train on the Port Whitby and Port Perry Railway reached the terminus in Port Perry in 1872. In the following year the grain elevator was built, still standing today as Canada's oldest existing grain elevator. Cargo from all over northern Ontario was shipped via the Trent-Severn Waterway to Port Perry via Lake Scugog, and then via the railway to Whitby, where it could be loaded onto the CP or CN mainlines running along the shore of Lake Ontario, or onto ships in Port Whitby. Businesses quickly moved out of Prince Albert and moved to Port Perry, leaving Prince Albert effectively a suburb of Port Perry today. The Port Perry Granary still stands as a tall sentinel on the shores of Lake Scugog and proud of being Canada's oldest grain elevator outlasting numerous fires and modern day demolition.

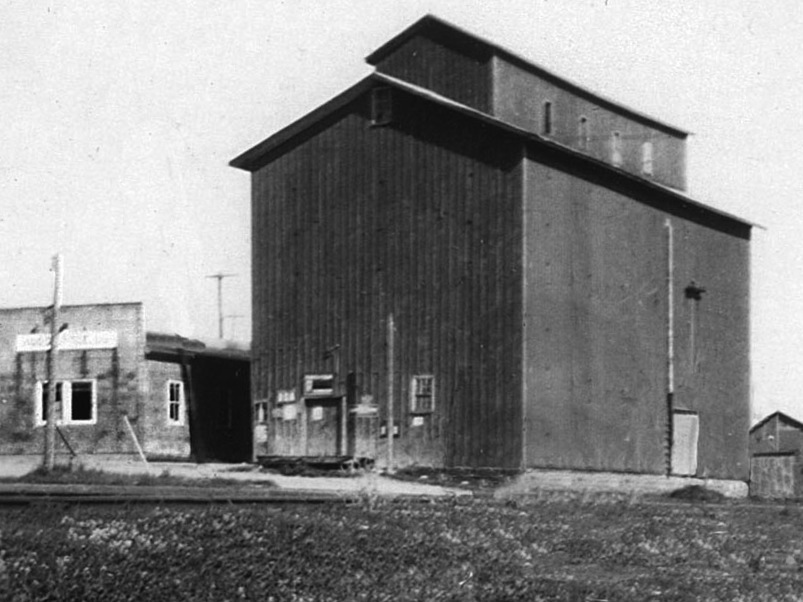
The Port Perry mill and grain elevator, circa 1930. Originally built in 1873, the building remains a major landmark to this day. The original line of the PW&PP Railway can be seen in the foreground.

The village was amalgamated with Cartwright, Reach and Scugog Townships to form the Township of Scugog in 1974 upon the creation of the Regional Municipality of Durham.

An Ontario Historical Plaque was erected at the Scugog Shores Museum by the province to commemorate cartoonist Jimmy Frise's role in Ontario's heritage.

== Culture and recreation ==
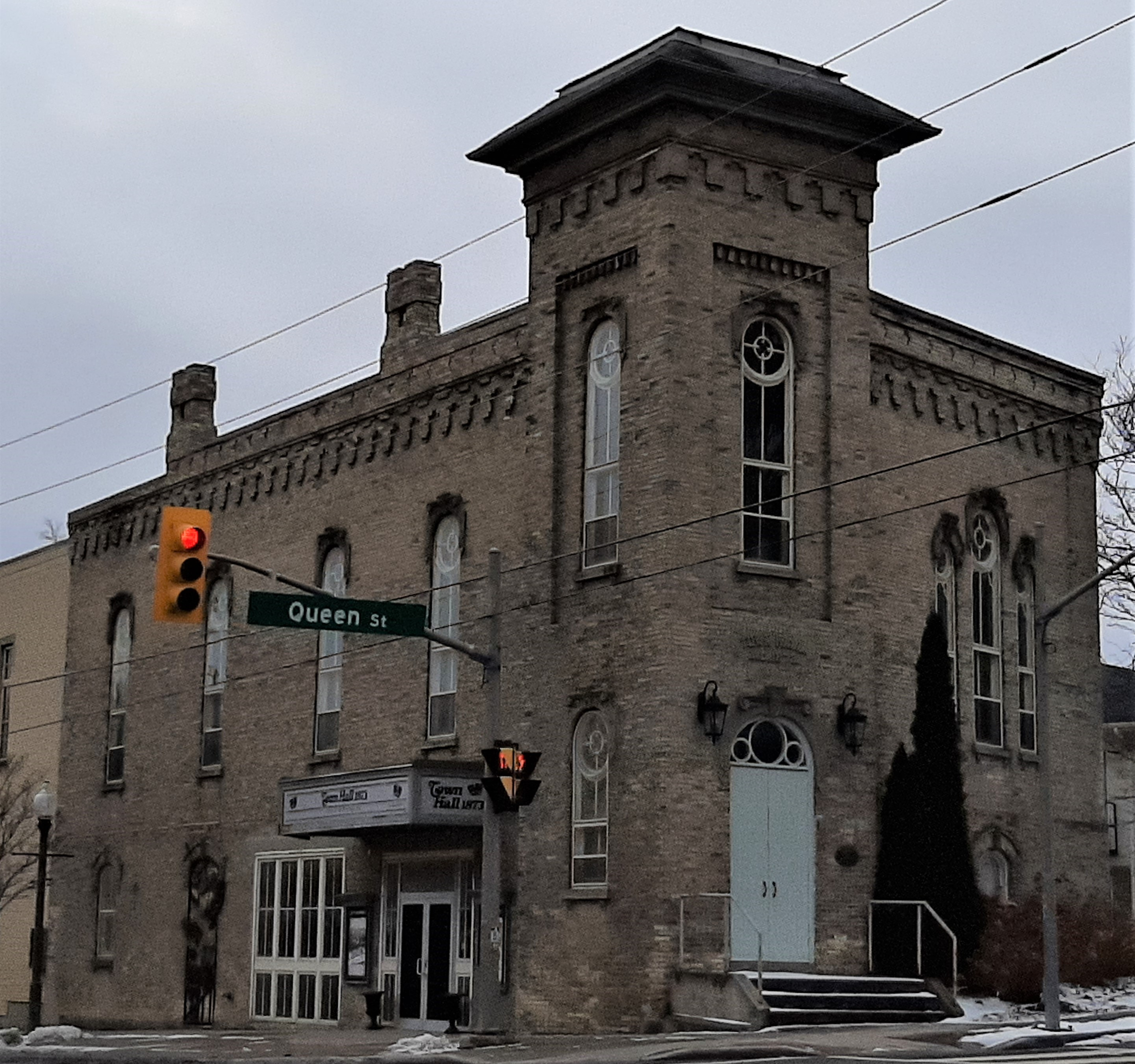
The Town Hall 1873 Centre for the Performing Arts

Port Perry's Victorian-era downtown is a tourist destination, with clothing stores, restaurants, cafés, bookstores, galleries and antique shops. In the summer, the town features the festivals Mississauga First Nation Pow Wow, the Highland Games, the Dragon Boat Races and StreetFest. Port Perry is also home to the Theatre on The Ridge summer theatre festival featuring 6 shows performed at Townhall 1873 during July and August. Its annual fair, held every Labour Day weekend, has been running for over 150 years. There are also golf courses, both public and private. Other attractions in Port Perry and surrounding area include the Great Blue Heron Charity Casino, Scugog Memorial Library (featuring the Kent Farndale Art Gallery), the Scugog Shores Historical Museum and the Town Hall 1873 Centre for the Performing Arts.

At many local farms, visitors may pick their own seasonal fruit (strawberries, raspberries, apples). In the summer, bass tournaments and lakeside activities are also featured.

The Lake Scugog shoreline offers two popular lakeside parks, Palmer and Birdseye. There are active fishing seasons, both winter and summer. In the winter months, Lake Scugog is dotted with ice-fishing huts and is a destination for ice fishermen and snowmobilers.

=== Scugog Community Recreation Centre ===
The township of Scugog built the Scugog Community Recreation Centre in the late 1977 as a replacement for the old downtown arena. The original facility contained just one pad with 6 dressing rooms. In 1995 a community centre was built and In 2004 there was a second pad attached to the complex.

The Rec Centre contains: 2 Ice Rinks, 2 seasonal floor pads in the summer, 3 meeting rooms, 1 banquet hall, 1 commercial kitchen and 2 multi purpose rec rooms. The centre also hosts the Scugog Sports Hall of Fame, and is the main hub for Camp Scugog.

The arena is home to North Durham Minor Hockey, the Central Ontario Wolves and the Port Perry Lumberjacks.

== Demographics ==
Historical populations
Year	Pop.	±%
2001	7,395	—
2006	8,499	+14.9%
2011	9,717	+14.3%
2016	9,453	−2.7%
2021	9,553	+1.1%

== Notable residents ==
- Kate Beirness, TSN sports broadcaster and Port Perry native
- Dick Bourgeois-Doyle, writer and science administrator
- George Burnett, hockey coach in National Hockey League, American Hockey League, Ontario Hockey League and Hockey Canada
- George A. Cope, CEO, Bell Canada Enterprises
- Gertrude Spurr Cutts, English-born painter spent latter part of her life in Port Perry
- Ty Dellandrea, forward for the San Jose Sharks of the National Hockey League
- Brad Goreski, celebrity fashion stylist and TV personality born in Port Perry
- Vladimir Hachinski, renowned clinical neurologist and researcher in stroke and dementia; born in Ukraine and raised in Port Perry
- Bill Lishman, sculptor, filmmaker, inventor, naturalist and public speaker; lived in nearby Blackstock
- James Howden MacBrien, Commander of the Canadian Army and RCMP; born in nearby Myrtle and raised in Port Perry
- Jayde Nicole, Canadian Model, born in Scarborough and raised in Port Perry
- Daniel David Palmer, the founder of Palmer School of Chiropractic; born in Port Perry
- J. F. Paxton (1857–1936), Canadian ice hockey administrator
- Thomas Paxton (1820–1887), Port Perry industrial businessman, politician and sheriff
- Dan Petronijevic, television actor
- John Ross Roach, NHL goalie of the 1930s and born in Port Perry
- Craig Russell, female impersonator, best known for his lead role in the movie, Outrageous!; buried in Port Perry
- Emily VanCamp, film and television actress; born and raised in Port Perry
- Fred Whitcroft, amateur and NHA hockey player, inductee of Hockey Hall of Fame; born in Port Perry

== In film and television ==
Port Perry has attracted many film crews over the years, both for feature film and television. It served as the fictional Maine town of Mooseport in the 2004 film Welcome to Mooseport and was used briefly as a small town in New Hampshire during the sixth season of The West Wing. The town was the primary production location for the 1996 film Fly Away Home, based on Port Perry inventor Bill Lishman's experiments in the 1980s and 1990s imprinting geese in order to alter and preserve migration routes. The film fictionalized Lishman's personal life, but used him as a consultant for its aerial and technical production. Outdoor scenes of the 2023 horror movie Thanksgiving were filmed in downtown Port Perry.

Port Perry was used as exteriors for the TV series Hemlock Grove which is set in Western Pennsylvania. Amazon TV series Reacher (Season 1) was shot around downtown Port Perry in 2020–2021. The town's Piano Inn & Cafe was renamed to "JJ's Ale House" for the shoot. Port Perry was used as a small town known as Lakeside for season three of the Amazon TV series American Gods. They painted the shop portion of the Mill black, and the "PORT PERRY" wording at the top of the Old Mill was changed to "LAKESIDE" for the duration of filming.
