= Angus McLeod (politician) =

Canadian politician

Angus McLeod (February 5, 1857 – November 18, 1902) was a farmer, lumber merchant and political figure in Ontario, Canada. He represented Ontario North in the House of Commons of Canada from 1900 to 1902 as a Liberal-Conservative.

Born in Campbellville, Canada West, he served on the town council for Bracebridge. McLeod was an unsuccessful candidate for a seat in the House of Commons in 1897.

He married Hannah Langford in 1886. McLeod died in office at the age of 45 while travelling on business in British Columbia.
