= Isaac James Gould =

Canadian politician

Member of Parliament for Ontario West
- In office 1900–1904
- Preceded by: James David Edgar
- Succeeded by: Riding abolished

Ontario MPP
- In office 1883–1890
- Preceded by: Frank Madill
- Succeeded by: James Glendinning
- Constituency: Ontario North

Personal details
- Born: November 13, 1839 Uxbridge, Ontario
- Died: June 6, 1915 (aged 75)
- Party: Liberal
- Spouse: Rebecca Chapman (m. 1862)
- Occupation: Farmer

Isaac James Gould (November 13, 1839 – June 6, 1915) was an Ontario farmer, businessman and political figure. He represented Ontario North in the Legislative Assembly of Ontario from 1883 to 1890 and Ontario West in the House of Commons of Canada from 1900 to 1904 as a Liberal member.

He was born in Uxbridge, Upper Canada in 1839, the son of Joseph Gould who was a member of the assembly for the Province of Canada. In 1862, he married Rebecca Chapman. He owned gristmills and woollen mills and also took part in the lumber trade and banking. He also served as reeve for Uxbridge and was warden for Ontario County in 1883. Gould was elected by acclamation to the House of Commons in 1900 after the death of James David Edgar and reelected in the general election that followed later that year.
