= Ontario North =

Former federal electoral district in Ontario, Canada

Ontario electoral district

Defunct federal electoral district
- Legislature: House of Commons
- District created: 1867
- District abolished: 1924
- First contested: 1867
- Last contested: 1921

Ontario North was a federal electoral district represented in the House of Commons of Canada from 1867 to 1925. It was located in the province of Ontario. It was created by the British North America Act 1867.

The North Riding of Ontario initially consisted of the Townships of Reach, Uxbridge, Brock, Scott, Thorah, Mara, Rama and Scugog. In 1882, it was redefined to exclude the townships of Reach and Uxbridge, and to include the townships of Morrison, Ryde, Draper, Oakley, Macaulay, Maclean and Ridout and the villages of Bracebridge and Cannington. In 1892, "North Ontario" was defined to exclude the township of Scugog, and to include the village of Beaverton. In 1903, it was redefined to consist of the townships of Brock, Mara, Rama, Scott, Thora and Uxbridge, the town of Uxbridge, and the villages of Beaverton and Cannington.

The electoral district was abolished in 1924 when it was merged into Muskoka—Ontario riding.

== Members of Parliament ==
This riding has elected the following members of Parliament:

Parliament	Years	Member	Party
1st	1867–1872	John Hall Thompson	Liberal
2nd	1872–1874	William Henry Gibbs	Conservative
3rd	1874–1876	Adam Gordon	Liberal
3rd	1876–1878	William Henry Gibbs	Conservative
4th	1878–1880	George Wheler	Liberal
4th	1880–1882	George Wheler	Liberal
5th	1882–1887	Alexander Peter Cockburn	Liberal
6th	1887–1891	Frank Madill	Conservative
7th	1891–1895	Frank Madill	Conservative
7th	1895–1896	John Alexander McGillivray	Conservative
8th	1896–1897	John Alexander McGillivray	Conservative
8th	1897–1900	Duncan Graham	Independent
9th	1900–1903	Angus McLeod	Conservative
9th	1903–1904	George Davidson Grant	Liberal
10th	1904–1908	George Davidson Grant	Liberal
11th	1908–1911	Samuel Simpson Sharpe	Conservative
12th	1911–1917	Samuel Simpson Sharpe	Conservative
13th	1917–1919	Samuel Simpson Sharpe	Government (Unionist)
13th	1919–1921	Robert Henry Halbert	Independent
14th	1921–1925	Robert Henry Halbert	Progressive
Riding dissolved into Muskoka—Ontario

== Election history ==
1867 Canadian federal election
Party	Candidate	Votes
Liberal	John Hall Thompson	1,628
Liberal	Matthew Crooks Cameron	1,362
Eligible voters		3,674
Source: Canadian Parliamentary Guide, 1871

1872 Canadian federal election
Party	Candidate	Votes
Conservative	William Henry Gibbs	1,835
Liberal	John Hall Thompson	1,620

1874 Canadian federal election
Party	Candidate	Votes
Liberal	Adam Gordon	1,804
Conservative	William Henry Gibbs	1,712

By-election on Mr. Gordon's death, July 1876
Party	Candidate	Votes
Conservative	William Henry Gibbs	1,891
Independent	George Currie	1,804

1878 Canadian federal election
Party	Candidate	Votes
Liberal	George Wheler	2,215
Conservative	William Henry Gibbs	2,161

By-election on Mr. Wheeler being unseated on petition, 28 August 1880
Party	Candidate	Votes
Liberal	George Wheler	2,271
Conservative	William Henry Gibbs	2,113

1882 Canadian federal election
Party	Candidate	Votes
Liberal	Alexander Peter Cockburn	1,611
Conservative	William Henry Gibbs	1,552

1887 Canadian federal election
Party	Candidate	Votes
Conservative	Frank Madill	2,050
Liberal	Alexander Peter Cockburn	1,892

1891 Canadian federal election
Party	Candidate	Votes
Conservative	Frank Madill	2,206
Liberal	P. Cockburn	1,952

By-election on Mr. Madill's death, 12 December 1895
Party	Candidate	Votes
Conservative	John Alexander McGillivray	acclaimed

1896 Canadian federal election
Party	Candidate	Votes
Conservative	John Alexander McGillivray	2,328
Patrons of Industry	Duncan Graham	2,327

By-election on election being declared void, 4 February 1897
Party	Candidate	Votes
Independent	Duncan Graham	2,414
Conservative	Angus McLeod	2,397

1900 Canadian federal election
Party	Candidate	Votes
Conservative	Angus McLeod	2,357
Independent	Duncan Graham	1,839

By-election on Mr. McLeod's death, 10 March 1903
Party	Candidate	Votes
Liberal	George D. Grant	2,465
Independent	G. E. Foster	2,265

1904 Canadian federal election
Party	Candidate	Votes
Liberal	George D. Grant	2,161
Conservative	George A. Proctor	2,023

1908 Canadian federal election
Party	Candidate	Votes
Conservative	Samuel S. Sharpe	2,208
Liberal	George Davidson Grant	2,008

1911 Canadian federal election
Party	Candidate	Votes
Conservative	Samuel Simpson Sharpe	2,130
Liberal	Herbert Macdonald Mowat	1,572

1917 Canadian federal election
Party	Candidate	Votes
Government (Unionist)	Samuel Simpson Sharpe	3,123
Opposition (Laurier Liberals)	Frederick Hogg	1,568

By-election on Mr. Sharpe's death, 9 December 1919
Party	Candidate	Votes
Independent	Robert Henry Halbert	3,662
Progressive	Neil D. Mackinnon	3,477

1921 Canadian federal election
Party	Candidate	Votes
Progressive	Robert Henry Halbert	3,919
Conservative	Neil Donald McKinnon	3,772

== See also ==
- List of Canadian electoral districts
- Historical federal electoral districts of Canada
