= Ontario Highway 12 =

Ontario provincial highway

Highway 12
- Highway 12 highlighted in red

Route information
- Maintained by Ministry of Transportation of Ontario
- Length: 145.1 km (90.2 mi)
- Existed: January 14, 1922–present

Major junctions
- South end: Gatineau hydro corridor south of Brooklin
- Highway 407 (South of Brooklin); Highway 7 – Brooklin; Highway 7A; Highway 7 – Sunderland; Highway 48 (near Beaverton); Highway 11 – Orillia; Highway 400 – Coldwater
- West end: Highway 93 – Midland

Location
- Country: Canada
- Province: Ontario
- Major cities: Orillia, Whitby
- Towns: Blackwater, Sunderland, Waubaushene, Midland

Highway system
- Ontario provincial highways; Current; Former; 400-series
← Highway 11	→ Highway 15
Former provincial highways
Highway 14 →

King's Highway 12, commonly referred to as Highway 12 and historically known as the Whitby and Sturgeon Bay Road, is a provincially maintained highway in the Canadian province of Ontario. The highway connects the eastern end of the Greater Toronto Area (GTA) with Kawartha Lakes (via Highway 7), Orillia and Midland before ending at Highway 93. It forms the Central Ontario Route of the Trans-Canada Highway system from north of Sunderland (Highway 7) to Coldwater (Highway 400). Highway 12 connects several small towns along its 146 km (91 mi) route, and bypasses a short distance from many others. It is signed as a north–south route between Whitby and Orillia, and as an east–west route from there to Midland. The rural portions of the highway feature a posted speed limit of 80 km/h (50 mph), often dropping to 50 km/h (31 mph) through built-up areas. The entire route is patrolled by the Ontario Provincial Police.

Highway 12 was first established in early 1922 between Highway 2 in Whitby and Lindsay. The section running east from Sunderland became part of Highway 7 before route numbering was introduced in 1925. Highway 12 was then routed through Beaverton and around the eastern and northern shores of Lake Simcoe to Orillia and later to Midland; Beaverton was bypassed during the 1960s. The section south of Highway 7 in Brooklin was transferred to municipal government in mid-1997 and is now designated as Durham Regional Highway 12 north of Regional Road 28 (Rossland Road). A majority of Highway 12 follows the historic Whitby and Sturgeon Bay Road, constructed in the mid-1800s to connect Whitby and Penetanguishene, both important naval ports of the time.

== Route description ==
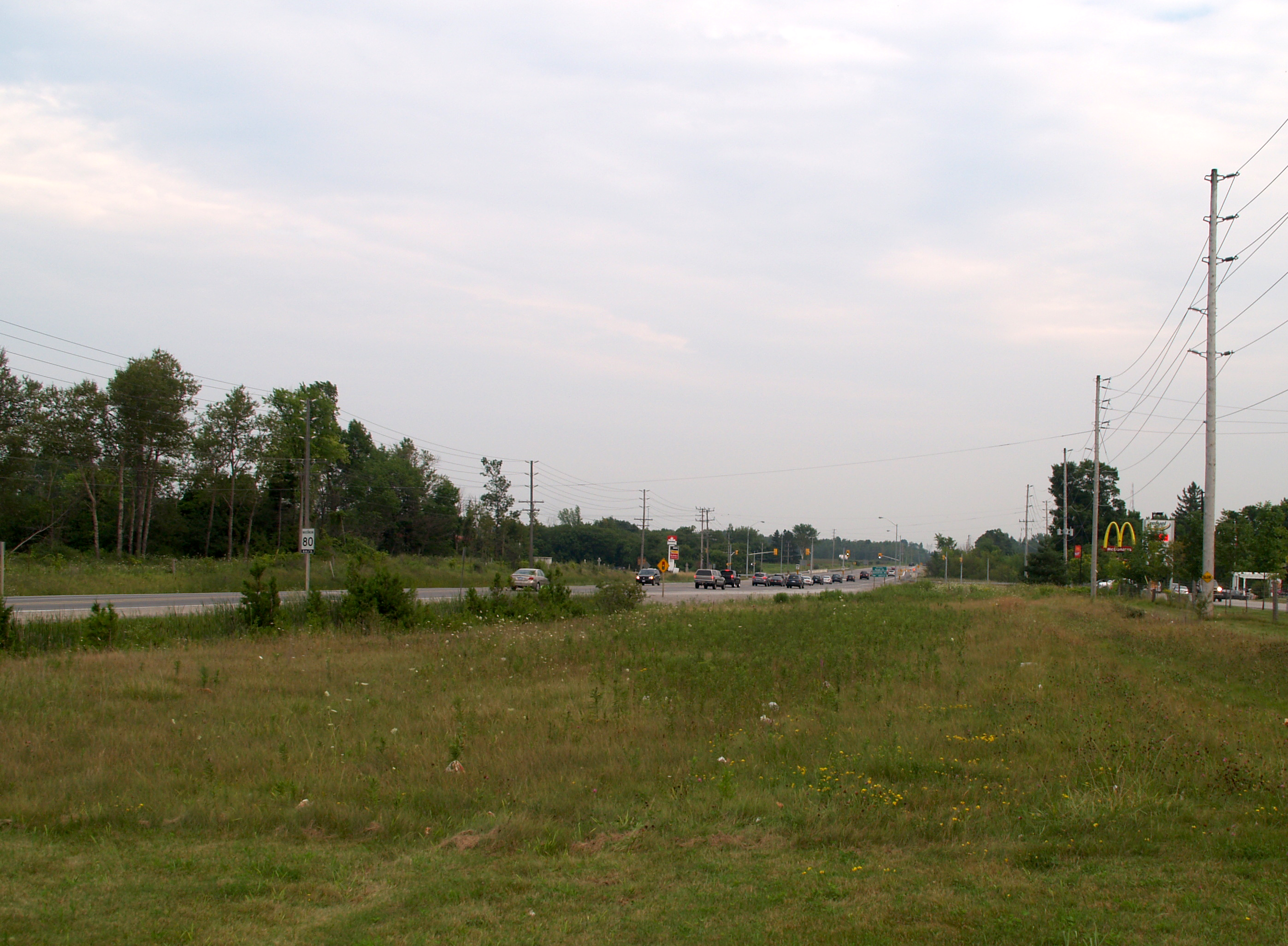
Highway 12 east of Beaverton

The highway begins at Highway 407, just south of the community of Brooklin in the town of Whitby. It travels north and joins with Highway 7 on the southern edge of Brooklin. Highway 7 travels west to Markham, and is signed concurrently with Highway 12 for 39.1 km (24.3 mi) north of this point to Sunderland. North of Sunderland, Highway 7 separates and travels east to Lindsay; Highway 12 thereafter receives the Trans-Canada Highway designation.

The highway continues north, following the eastern and northern shores of Lake Simcoe and bypassing Beaverton while curving to the northwest towards Orillia. It bypasses south of Orillia, and shares a routing with Highway 11 northwards for approximately two kilometres between interchanges 131 and 133. At the latter interchange, Highway 12 branches northwest towards Coldwater, where it joins Highway 400 between interchanges 141 and 147.

At Waubaushene, the Trans-Canada Highway designation ends as it follows Highway 400 as the Georgian Bay Route towards Parry Sound and Sudbury, while Highway 12 continues west towards Victoria Harbour, Port McNicoll, and the Martyrs' Shrine. The highway ends at a junction with Highway 93 at the western town limits of Midland.

== History ==
The southern terminus of Highway 12 before Highway 407 East was constructed.

The oldest portion of Highway 12 was originally known as the Coldwater Portage and later the Coldwater Road, connecting the modern sites of Orillia and Coldwater by a 23 km (14 mi) trail. Upper Canada Governor John Colborne surveyed the portage in 1830 and ordered it to be widened for wagon use. As the area was settled and an increasing need for land connection with the south arose, a new road was proposed from Whitby to Sturgeon Bay (near Waubaushene). In February 1843, the residents formally petitioned the government to construct the route. The Sturgeon Bay Road, from Coldwater to Sturgeon Bay, was opened as a rough wagon road in 1844. The Atherley Narrows, separating Lake Simcoe from Lake Couchiching, were surveyed in the early 1840s and the first causeway and bridge constructed in the years that followed. The portion of the route between Whitby and Orillia, however, was still under construction during the second half of the decade.

Highway 12 was first introduced into the provincial highway system on January 22, 1922, The highway, initially known as the Whitby–Lindsay Road, was not numbered until the summer of 1925. The route followed the present-day Highway 12 from Whitby to Sunderland, then travelled east to Lindsay.

Highway assumptions carried out on June 22 and July 2, 1927, extended Highway 7 east from Brampton to Peterborough. In doing so, it became concurrent with Highway 12 between Whitby and Sunderland. The route of Highway 12 between Sunderland and Lindsay was renumbered as part of Highway 7 at this time. Highway 12 was later extended north to Orillia, via Beaverton. This was accomplished through two assumptions. on August 17, the majority of the route through Brock, Thorah and Mara Townships was assumed. Several more miles were assumed on December 28, 1927, extending Highway 12 as far as Orillia. On August 5, 1931, Highway 12 was extended from Orillia to Midland. The majority of the route paralleled an existing railway that was constructed over a native portage.

Highway 12 southeast of Orillia

Highway 12 remained unaltered for several decades, until the mid-1960s, when the Beaverton Bypass was constructed. On November 4, 1966, the 10.3 km (6.4 mi) bypass opened, routing Highway 12 to the east. Portions of the former route of Highway 12 were renumbered as Highway 48B. The highway again remained unchanged for several decades, until a short portion of the southern end of the highway was decommissioned in the late 1990s. On April 1, 1997, the portions of Highway 12 south of Brooklin were transferred to municipal government. From Brooklin to Regional Road 28 (Rossland Road), the Regional Municipality of Durham has subsequently redesignated the road as Regional Highway 12.

Prior to the highway downloadings of 1997 and 1998, Highway 12 was also not routed concurrently along Highway 400 between Coldwater and Waubaushene, but instead ran as a single roadway parallel to, and crossing, the 400. The bypassed section was redesignated as Simcoe County Road 16. That section was signed as "TO 12" until 2016, when Highway 12 was officially rerouted along Vasey Road and onto a concurrency with Highway 400.

== Major intersections ==
The following table lists the major junctions along Highway 12, as noted by the Ministry of Transportation of Ontario.

Division	Location	km	mi	Destinations	Notes
Durham	Whitby	−8.1	−5.0	Regional Road 46 south (Brock Street) Highway 401 – Toronto, Kingston	Former southern terminus; former Highway 12 followed Brock Street; Highway 401 exit 410
Durham	Whitby	−6.5	−4.0	Dundas Street	Formerly Highway 2
Durham	Whitby	−4.5	−2.8	Regional Highway 12 begins Regional Road 28 (Rossland Road)	Regional Highway 12 southern terminus
Durham	Whitby	0.0	0.0	Highway 12 begins Regional Highway 12 ends Spencers Road	Regional Highway 12 northern terminus; Highway 12 southern terminus
Durham	Whitby	1.3	0.81	Highway 407 – Toronto, Peterborough	Highway 407 exit 118
Durham	Brooklin	1.9	1.2	Highway 7 west – Markham; Regional Road 3 east (Winchester Road)	Southern end of Highway 7 concurrency
Durham	Whitby	6.0	3.7	Regional Road 26 south (Thickson Road)	
Durham	Scugog	16.1	10.0	Highway 7A – Port Perry, Peterborough; Regional Road 21 west (Goodwood Road)	Manchester
Durham	Scugog	19.0	11.8	Regional Road 8 (Reach Street) – Port Perry, Uxbridge	
Durham	Scugog	23.2	14.4	Regional Highway 47 west – Uxbridge, Stouffville	
Durham	Scugog	29.0	18.0	Regional Road 6 east (Saintfield Road) – Seagrave	Saintfield
Durham	Brock	33.4	20.8	Regional Road 13	Blackwater
Durham	Brock	38.2	23.7	Regional Road 10 west (River Street)	Sunderland
Durham	Brock	41.0	25.5	Highway 7 east / TCH – Lindsay	Northern end of Highway 7 concurrency; southern end of Trans-Canada Highway (continues on Highway 7 east)
Durham	Brock	46.8	29.1	Regional Road 12 – Cannington	
Durham	Brock	50.9	31.6	Highway 48 west – Sutton, Toronto	Former southern end of Highway 48 concurrency
Durham	Brock	57.0	35.4	Regional Road 15 (Simcoe Street)	
Durham	Brock	61.1	38.0	Regional Road 23 south (Mara Road) – Beaverton	
Durham	Brock	63.6	39.5	Regional Highway 48 east (Portage Road)	Former Highway 48 east; northern end of Highway 48 concurrency
Durham	Brock	64.3	40.0	Regional Road 50 north – Gamebridge	
Simcoe	Ramara	65.4	40.6	County Road 51 south – Gamebridge	
Simcoe	Ramara	70.1	43.6	County Road 47 east	Brechin
Simcoe	Ramara	74.1	46.0	County Road 169 north – Gravenhurst	Formerly Highway 169 north
Simcoe	Ramara	88.9	55.2	County Road 44 (Rama Road) – Longford Mills	Atherley
Lake Couchiching; Lake Simcoe		89.9	55.9	Atherley Narrows Bridge	
Orillia		91.4	56.8	Atherley Road	
Orillia		93.6	58.2	West Street	
Orillia		94.9	59.0	Memorial Avenue	
Orillia		96.8	60.1	Highway 11 south – Barrie Old Barrie Road East	Southern end of Highway 11 concurrency; Highway 11 exit 131
Orillia		99.2	61.6	Coldwater Road West Highway 11 north – North Bay, Gravenhurst	Northern end of Highway 11 concurrency; Highway 11 exit 133
Simcoe	Severn – Oro-Medonte boundary	105.0	65.2	County Road 22 (Horseshoe Valley Road) – Craighurst	Prices Corners
Simcoe	Oro-Medonte	115.8	72.0	County Road 19 (Moonstone Road) – Elmvale	
Simcoe	Severn	118.9	73.9	Woodrow Road / Coldwater Road – Coldwater	To County Road 17 west
Simcoe	Severn	120.2	74.7	Sturgeon Bay Road County Road 16 north	Highway 12 formerly followed County Road 16 north
Simcoe	Severn	120.6	74.9	Highway 400 south – Toronto County Road 23 west (Vasey Road)	Highway 400 exit 141; southern end of Highway 400 concurrency
Simcoe	Tay	126.5	78.6	County Road 16 south Highway 400 north / TCH – Parry Sound	Waubaushene Highway 400 exit 147; northern end of Highway 400 concurrency; northern end of Trans-Canada Highway (continues on Highway 400 north); Highway 12 formerly followed County Road 16 south
Simcoe	Tay	132.7	82.5	Park Street	Victoria Harbour
Simcoe	Tay	139.1	86.4	County Road 58 south (Old Fort Road)	Port McNicoll
Simcoe	Midland	145.1	90.2	Highway 93 south (Sarah Burke Memorial Highway) – Barrie; County Road 93 north (Penetanguishene Road) – Penetanguishene	Northern terminus
1.000 mi = 1.609 km; 1.000 km = 0.621 mi: Closed/former; Concurrency terminus; Route transition

Trans-Canada Highway
Previous route Highway 400	Highway 12	Next route Highway 7
