= Ontario Highway 400A =

Controlled-access highway in Ontario

Highway 400A

Route information
- Maintained by Ministry of Transportation of Ontario
- Length: 1.1 km (0.68 mi)
- Existed: December 24, 1959–April 1, 1997

Major junctions
- South end: Highway 400 – Barrie
- North end: County Road 93 (Penetanguishene Road) (continues as Highway 11 – Orillia)

Location
- Country: Canada
- Province: Ontario
- Counties: Simcoe

Highway system
- Ontario provincial highways; Current; Former; 400-series
← Highway 400	→ Highway 401

King's Highway 400A was a 400-series highway in the Canadian province of Ontario that was unsigned and is now the southern end of Highway 11. The short 1.1-kilometre (0.7 mi) freeway link connected Highway 400 with Highway 11 and Simcoe County Road 93, formerly Highway 93. The route was created as a result of an original segment being bypassed by an extension of Highway 400 to Coldwater that opened in late 1959. The Highway 400A route number was only used internally as the road has always featured Highway 400 signage in the southbound direction and Highway 11 signage northbound. In 1997, Highway 400A was eliminated when the road was redesignated as a new routing of Highway 11 proper, resulting in Highway 11's southern terminus being directly at Highway 400, while the rest of Highway 11 south from Barrie to Toronto was downloaded to municipal governments

== Route description ==
The short highway features a narrow grass median for the majority of its length, and has a speed limit of 100 kilometres per hour (62 mph). On average, the highway is used by approximately 11,900 vehicles daily. Highway 400A (now Highway 11) began as Highway 400 "exits" on a semi-directional ramp that crosses above via a flyover. Unusually, traffic to and from Highway 400 (often colloquially known as the Highway 400 extension north of the split) enters and exits at the right of the roadway, while traffic to and from former Highway 400A (now Highway 11) simply continues on the same roadway. This split interchange is also incomplete; drivers must either use the Forbes Road and Penetanguishene Road interchanges, or continue southbound into Barrie and exit and re-enter northbound at Duckworth Street in order to travel from southbound Highway 11 to northbound Highway 400 or from southbound Highway 400 to northbound Highway 11.

After the interchange with Highway 400, the highway ascends, with grasslands to the east and an embankment to the west, then gently curves to the northeast. As it crosses Simcoe County Road 93 (Penetanguishene Road), formerly Highway 93, the former highway ended as it continued as Highway 11.

== History ==
Highway 400A formed the original routing of Highway 400 from 1950 to 1959. In 1950, the then-incomplete freeway was extended north through the city of Barrie to the junction of Highway 11 and Highway 93 in Crown Hill; the entirety of Highway 400 would open on Dominion Day in 1952.

In the late-1950s, the construction of the Trans-Canada Highway prompted the Department of Highways to extend the route north to Highway 12 and Highway 103 (both designated as branch routes of the TCH) in Coldwater, deemed the "Highway 400 Extension". As constructed the extension would branch off from existing highway by means of a partial interchange (since then, newer provincial construction guidelines would have mandated that the existing highway be realigned to flow directly into the extension, while providing an interchange to the section of highway that was bypassed). This extension opened as a super two on December 24, 1959, redirecting Highway 400 southwest of the Crown Hill junction. To remedy this situation, the 1.1 km (0.68 mi) gap between the original terminus and the new turnoff was internally designated as Highway 400A. The highway has never been signed as Highway 400A. Instead, northbound it is indicated as Highway 11 and southbound as Highway 400.

Restructuring of the provincial highway system resulted in Highway 11 south of the Crown Hill interchange being transferred, or downloaded, to local municipalities on April 1, 1997. Highway 11 then absorbed the entirety of Highway 400A, as a result Highway 11's southern terminus was shifted to meet Highway 400 directly at the split interchange.

Construction began north of Barrie in April 2013 to replace the overpass at this split interchange. The new precast post-tensioned concrete structure, designed to accommodate future widening of the former Highway 400A, was completed in October 2015. The original overpass, built during the 1950s and rehabilitated in the 1990s, was demolished during an overnight closure on December 13, 2015. The overall cost of this project was C$8.5 million.

== Exit list ==
There were only two interchanges along Highway 400A; the start and end termini. The entirety of the highway is now part of Highway 11.

km	mi	Destinations	Notes
0.0	0.0	Highway 400 south – Barrie, Toronto	Northbound exit and southbound entrance; Highway 400 exit 106
1.1	0.68	County Road 93 north – Penetanguishene; Penetanguishene Road – Barrie Highway 11 north – Orillia, North Bay	Formerly Highway 93 north; Highway 11 south formerly followed Penetanguishene Road
1.000 mi = 1.609 km; 1.000 km = 0.621 mi: Incomplete access
