= Vrooman =

Vrooman may refer to:

- Vrooman (surname)
- Vrooman Avenue School, a historic building in Amsterdam, New York, U.S.
- Vrooman Field, another name for Charles Watson Stadium, Conway, South Carolina, U.S.
- Vrooman's Point, Ontario, Canada
- Scott–Vrooman House, now Vrooman Mansion Bed and Breakfast, in Bloomington, Illinois, U.S.

== See also ==
- Vroomanton, a ghost town in Ontario, Canada
- Vroman (disambiguation)
