= Brock High School (Ontario) =

- Front of Brock High School

Location
- C1590, Regional Road 12; Cannington, Ontario, L0E 1E0; Canada; 44°20′36″N 79°04′00″W

Information
- School type: Public, high school
- Motto: Altiora Peto (I Seek To Go Higher)
- Founded: 1953
- School board: Durham District School Board
- School number: 896446
- Principal: William Jovel
- Grades: 9-12
- Enrolment: 395 (2019/2020)
- Language: English
- Area: Brock
- Colours: Red, Gold, Black
- Mascot: Bulldog
- Website: www.ddsb.ca/school/brockhs/Pages/default.aspx

Brock High School is located in Cannington, Ontario. It is the northernmost high school in the Durham District School Board. Brock High School serves families from the towns of Cannington, Beaverton, Sunderland, and the rural families of Brock Township. It is the northernmost high school in the Durham District School Board and has students in Grades 9 through 12.

The school is located on the south side of the 12th concession of Brock Township approximately 1.5 kilometres west of the town of Cannington.

Brock High School has approximately 50 full-time and part-time teaching staff.

== History ==
The school was based on designs by Shore & Moffat Architects and was constructed in 1952. Classes began in 1953. The school has experienced four major architectural expansions to cater to the growing needs of the rural communities that it serves.

== See also ==
- Education in Ontario
- List of secondary schools in Ontario
