= Vroman =

Vroman may refer to:

- Vroman (surname)
- Vroman, Colorado, a community in the United States
- Vroman, Nebraska, a community in the United States
- Vroman's Nose, a prominent geological feature in Schoharie County, New York

== See also ==
- Vrooman (disambiguation)
