= Sunderland, Ontario =

Sunderland
- Unincorporated community
- River Street

- Location within Ontario
- Coordinates: 44°15′49″N 79°03′56″W
- Country: Canada
- Province: Ontario
- Regional municipality: Durham
- Township: Brock
- Founded: 1822

Area (2021)
  - Land: 1.13 km^{2} (0.44 sq mi)
- Elevation: 200 m (660 ft)

Population (2021)
  - Total: 1,490
  - Density: 1,318.1/km^{2} (3,414/sq mi)
- Time zone: UTC−05:00 (EST)
  - Summer (DST): UTC−04:00 (EDT)
- Forward sortation area: L0C 1H0
- Area code: 705
- NTS Map: 031D06
- GNBC Code: FCTWV

Sunderland is a community located approximately 100 km (62 mi) northeast of Toronto, Ontario, Canada in Brock Township, in the Regional Municipality of Durham. This is currently one of the very few populated areas of the Greater Toronto Area where the Trans-Canada Highway passes near, thus also making this the closest point from the highway to the City of Toronto at 100 km (62 mi) apart.

== Business and commerce ==
Sunderland has a community of small businesses that focus primarily on the needs of surrounding rural families. Downtown Sunderland also has a number of restaurants, drug store, dog groomer, grocery and bottle store, hardware store, an art gallery, a museum (Sunderland & District Historical Society), bank, post office, a corn maze (Buzzing Bees Adventure Farm) and a branch of the Royal Canadian Legion.

== History ==
The land that the Town of Sunderland was built on, was granted in the early 1820s to United Empire Loyalists. (Sir Isaac Brock's Estate was given 570 ha (1,400 acres) of free land in the vicinity). Sunderland slowly grew around the Brock Hotel - a popular overnight stop for travellers that was owned by Lorenzo Jones. The first post office was called Brock and was run by Andrew Hill; it was located just north at the modern junction of Highway 12 and 7th Concession.

Sunderland was originally called Jones Corners, as both Arch and Lorenzo Jones owned property in what became the downtown core. They produced a town plan and it was renamed Sunderland by 1871 when the Toronto - Lindsay Line of the Toronto and Nipissing Railway was built. The town's population grew rapidly during this time. (Vroomanton, a larger village to the west was bypassed by the railway, and its population subsequently dropped).

Sunderland's name is thought to come from Charles Spencer, the third Earl of Sunderland in England. He was the Secretary of State, and he helped move Palatine German families to London and then, with Queen Anne's aid, to Ireland in the early 18th century. Many of the men in these families had ancestors who fought for Britain in the American War of Independence in 1776 and in the War of 1812 in the New World, and so, in 1818, after the wars, for their efforts, they were granted free land in what was to become Brock Township. These early Palatine settlers included surnames like: Shier, Baker, Bagshaw, Switzer, Lowe, St. John, Lodwick, Brethour and Doble.

Hurricane Hazel struck Sunderland in 1954, and another storm in 1957 destroyed the skating arena and tore out many trees. Although the railway ceased operations through Sunderland in the 1980s, the town has remained vibrant, due in no small part to its close proximity to Toronto, Lindsay, and Newmarket.

The Sunderland & District Historical Society maintains an archive of historical information about the village's century homes.

27 River Street is the home of Thomas Welsh (1856-1925), a local entrepreneur who ran a grist mill at the location of the current Sunderland Co-Operative and in the evening provided electricity to the town around 1916. Later the house was owned by George Arthur Welsh a flying ace in World War I, and in World War II commanded an anti-tank battery and took part in the Allied invasion of Sicily. He served with the provincial government as Minister of Travel and Publicity from 1946 to 1948 and Provincial Secretary and Registrar from 1949 to 1955. It was later owned by his grandson Tom Welsh 1930-1973.

128 River Street is the former home of Dr. Joseph Oliver (1870-1966), a rural doctor who practised in the community for 50 years. Stories of his year round house calls are epic. The home was built in 1904 and served as both residence, office and dispensary.

160 River Street, a large brick home, was originally owned by Dr. James McDermott, a medical doctor and resident from 1870 -1920. McDermott was an investor actively involved in the development of the village. He organized the rebuilding of the Brock House in 1910 and financed the building of the McDermott Block, a multi-unit commercial structure at the south east corner of River and Albert streets. This block was destroyed in the village's great fire in 1949.

3 Cedar Street this was originally the home of James Doble (1825-1907), an entrepreneur who established Sunderland’s first bank, Doble and Company. Later the house was owned by Lottie Ray and then Wesley Doble.

26 River Street, known as the Fogg House, this example of Victorian architecture, featuring a sweeping veranda was built about 1905. Its original owner, Thomas Fogg was the affluent owner of the Nippissing Hotel, a thriving centre of commerce in the village. Inside the home features ash wainscotting, oak panelling and ornate tin ceilings. In 1967 the home was purchased by Bill and Joan Yerema who were committed to preserving the home’s original features.

32 Albert Street S. is thought to be one of the oldest homes in Sunderland, built quite possibly in the 1850’s by the Jones family for whom Jones’ Corners (now known as Sunderland) was named. The property was acquired by William Doble and his wife Margaret Ruddy in 1875 and ownership passed on to James and Mary Ellen Doble in 1922 and then Harold and Beryl Doble in 1964. Herb Gray owned the property at the turn of the last century.

28 Jones Street was acquired by Charles Leslie Lowes, a self-made millionaire who apprenticed in Sunderland as a baker under the tutelage of William Thompson. The original frame home on the property was replaced sometime in the 1930’s with the two-story brick home that we see today. The interior of the home features a brick fireplace, formal dining room, double french doors and four bedrooms. Through a lifelong, rent-free lease, Lowes gifted the property to his sister, Ida Carter. Following her death in 1952, the property was acquired by George and Evelyn Edwards.

60 River Street was the home of George Kay, Sunderland's last blacksmith. He purchased this home in 1907 and resided in it until 1995 when it was purchased by George Durward. Kay's busy shop was on the lot immediately east of the house and was a gathering place for many local farmers who would catch up on local news.

48 River Street was first owned by Robert Murray Doble (1861-1949) and his wife Margaret Ray (1863-1941) and then by his son Floyd Doble (1896-1962) who moved off his 4th concession farm on the 4th of Brock. Later, the home was owned by Denise Marsh who operated an antique business called the Glass Garage from it.

15 Albert St. N. This two-storey yellow brick home was built by Frank Doble, a Sunderland lumberman. The double veranda with ornamental woodwork appeared in the architecture of some of the community's more affluent residents.

== Notable houses ==
Notable houses
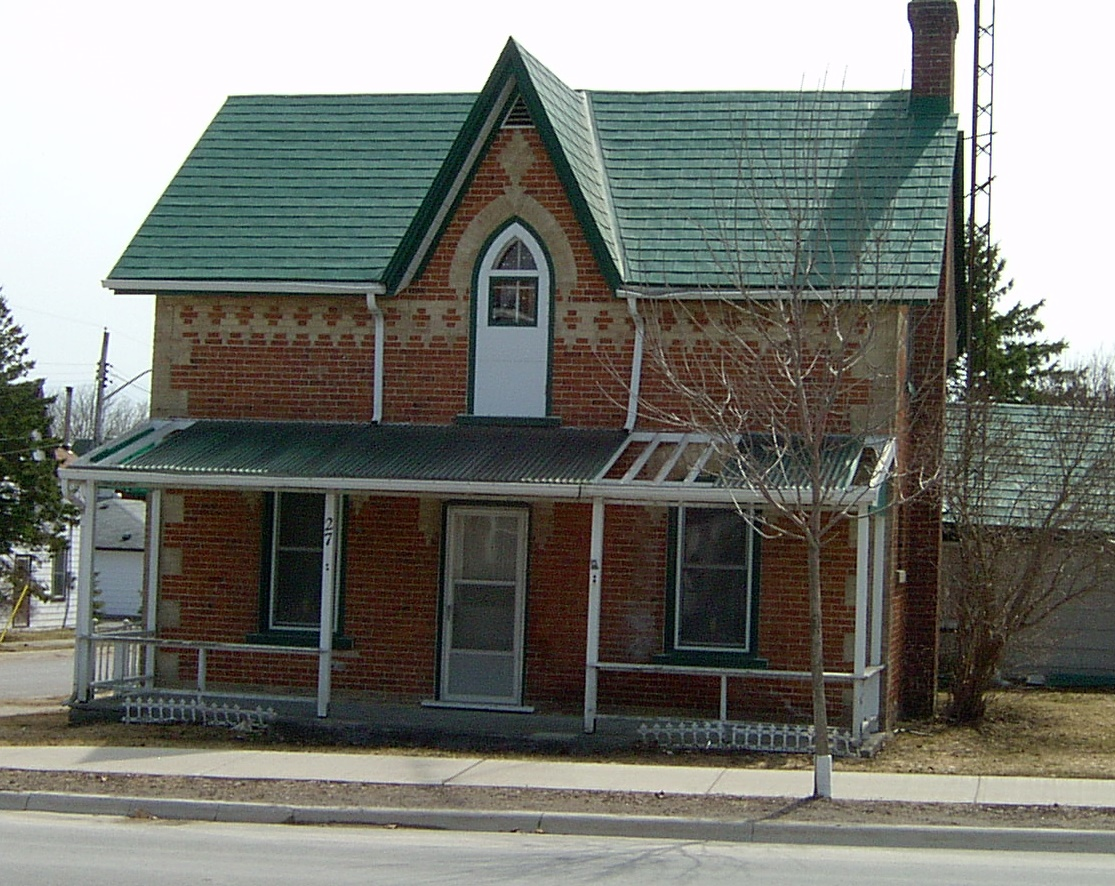
27 River St, former home of Thomas Welsh

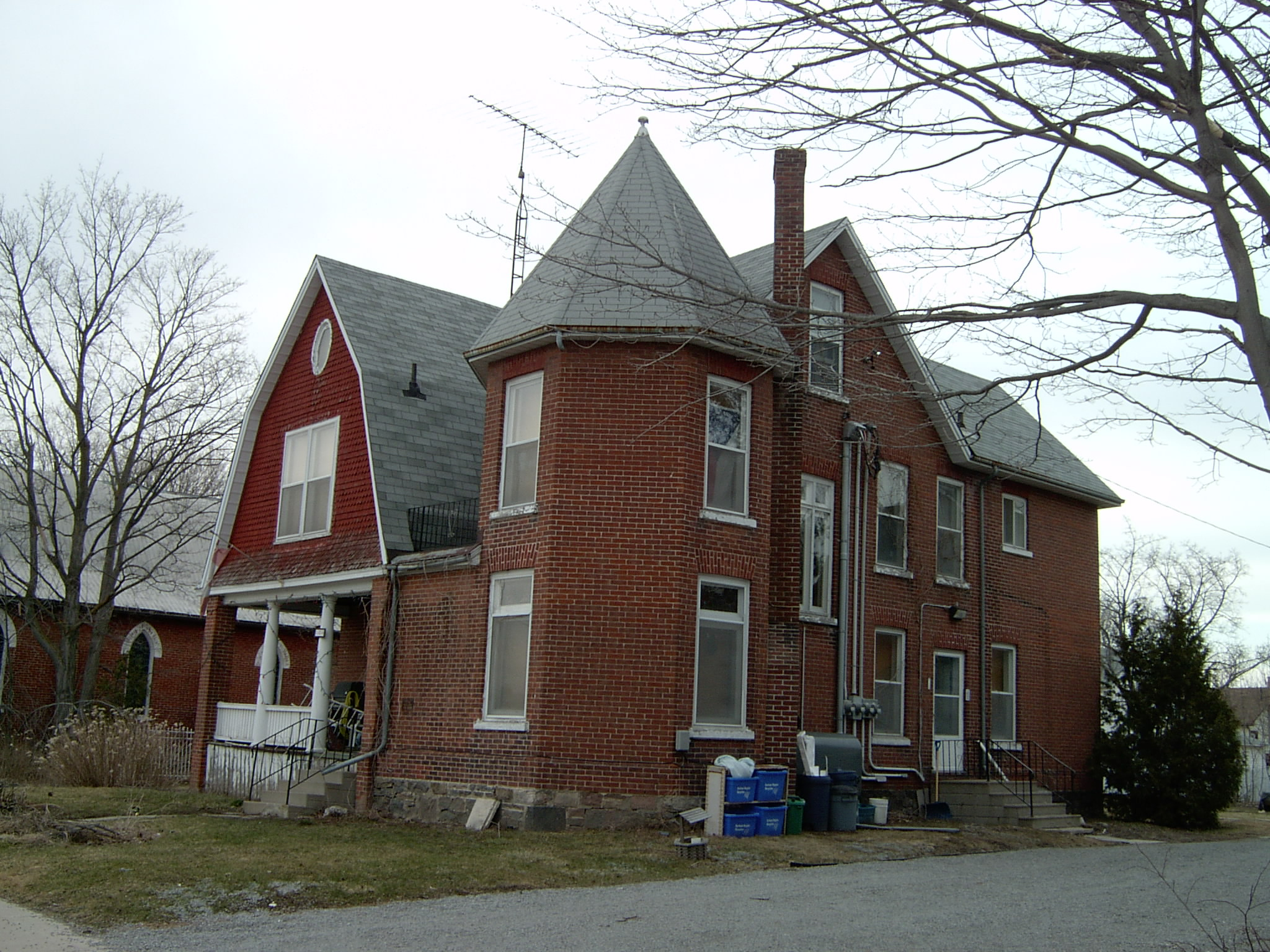
128 River Street, former home of Dr. Joseph Oliver

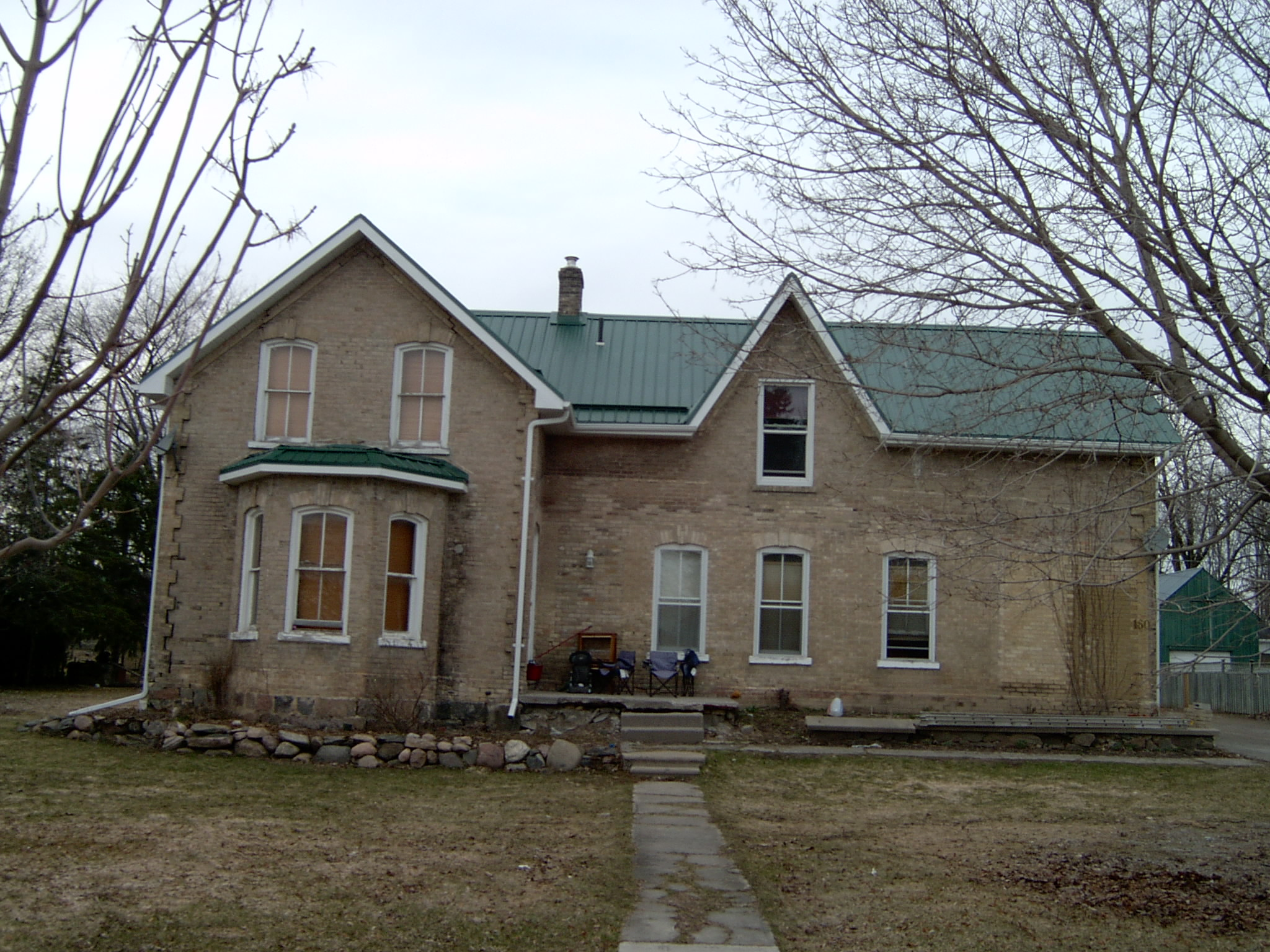
160 River Street, former home of Dr. James McDermott

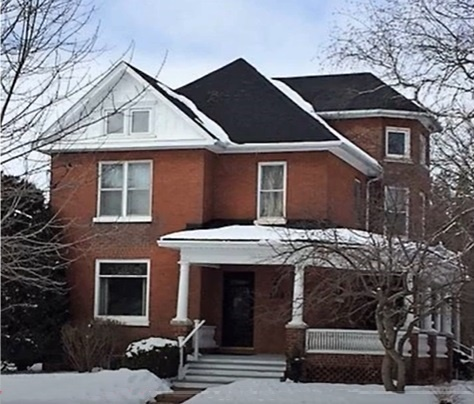
26 River Street, former home of Thomas Fogg

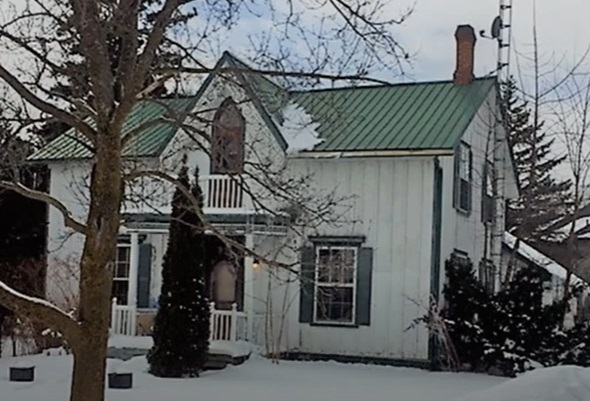
32 Albert Street S., former home of Harold Doble

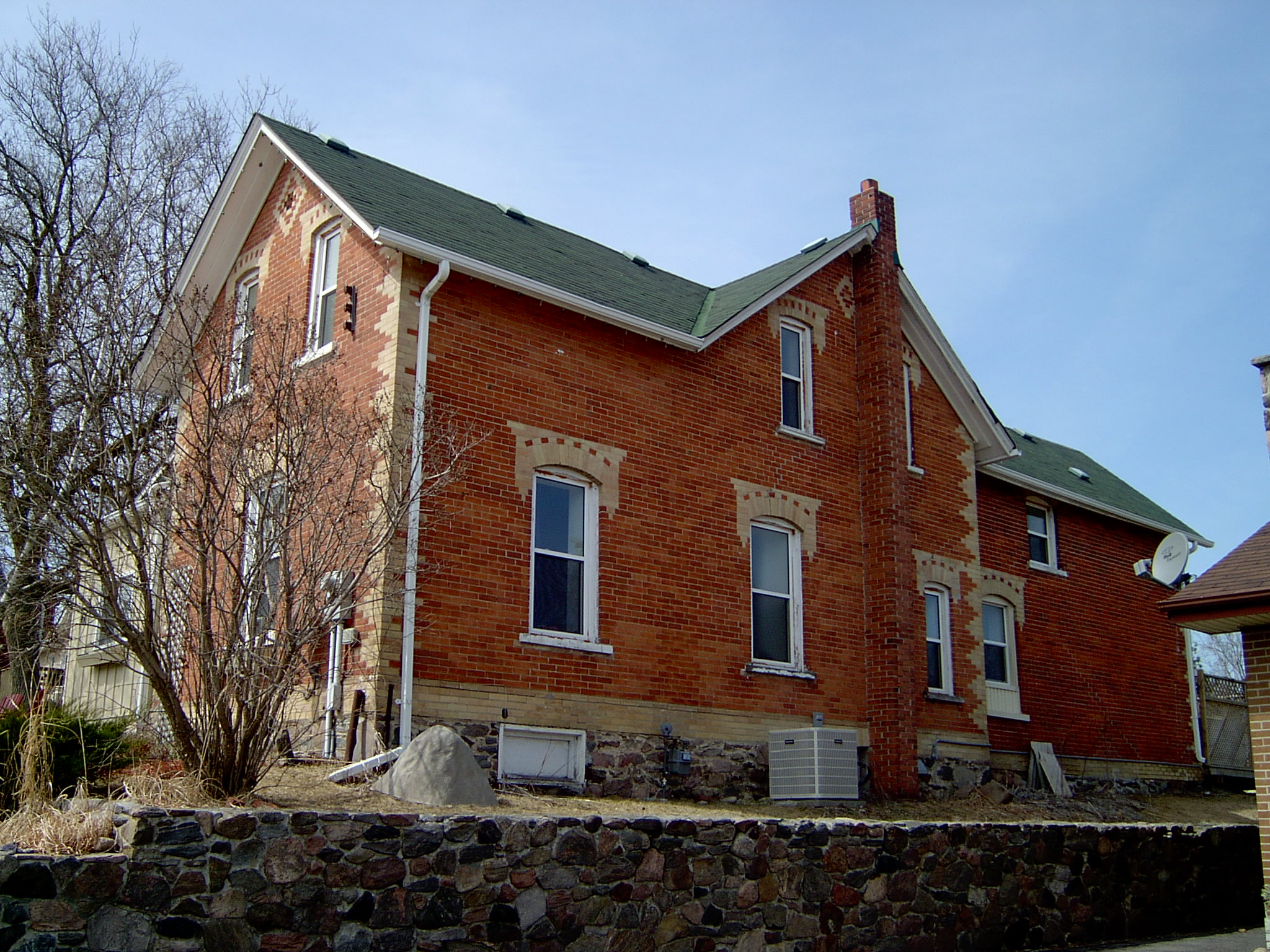
60 River Street, former home of George Kay

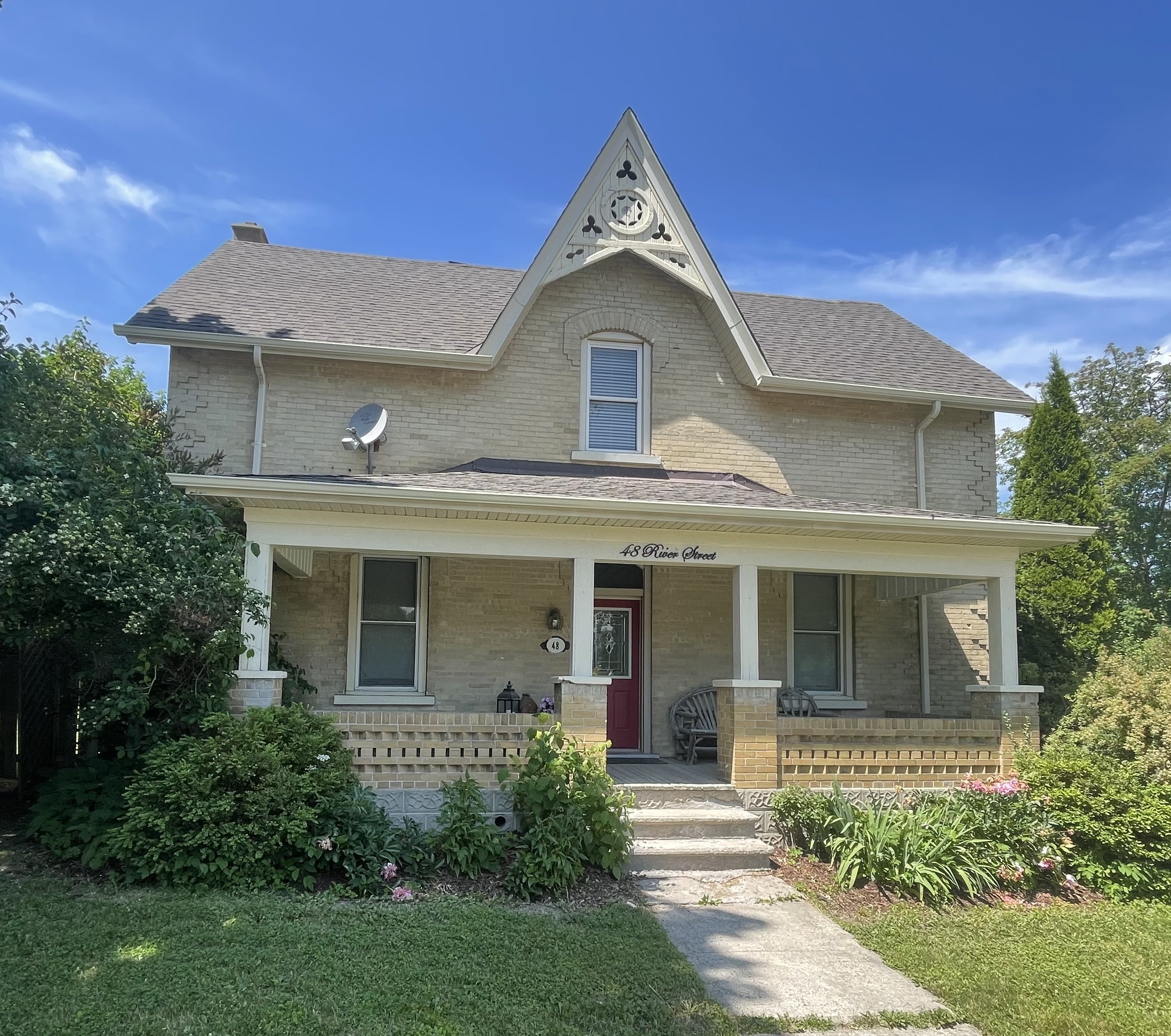
48 River Street, former home of Robert Murray Doble

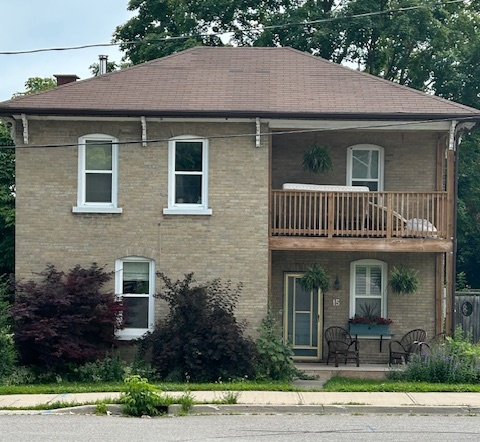
15 Albert St. N., former home of Frank Doble

== Demographics ==
In the 2021 Canadian census conducted by Statistics Canada, Sunderland had a population of 1,490 living in 537 of its 561 total private dwellings, a change of 19.9% from its 2016 population of 1,243. With a land area of 1.13 km^{2} (0.44 sq mi), it had a population density of 1,318.6/km^{2} (3,415.1/sq mi) in 2021.

== Geography ==
The region around Sunderland is rolling farmland, with dense first-growth deciduous forests and rich agricultural soil. Sunderland displays many typical traits of a temperate humid climate. Its altitude and proximity to the Canadian Shield allows for much deciduous forests with beginning sprouts of coniferous trees.

== Education ==
Sunderland has one public school, Sunderland Public School, which celebrated its 50-year anniversary on 20 October 2007. The nearest high school is Brock High School, located west of Cannington.

== Sports ==
Sunderland is home of the Brock Minor Hockey Association, the Sunderland Skating Club, the Sunderland Ringette Association, and Sunderland Minor Baseball.

== Events ==
Sunderland hosts the annual Maple Syrup Festival at the beginning of April each year. The town also hosts the annual Sunderland Fall Fair in September of each year. This fair has been held annually since the 1850s and is the longest continuously running fair in Ontario. As well, Sunderland hosts Orange Parades with the Orange Order, usually during the month of July.

== Service clubs ==
Sunderland has been home to a local Lions Club since 1955. As of 2011 the club has approximately 60 members which puts it amongst the largest in its Lions International District known as A-16. The club runs various fundraisers throughout the year such as a car draw and beach volleyball tournament as well as annually hosting a Blue Rodeo concert. All profits from these events are put back into service projects and used for the purpose of community betterment. One of the club's largest service projects is the annual Sunderland Lions Music Festival which is held over three weeks, beginning in mid-April.

== Nearby communities ==
- Beaverton, north
- Oakwood, east
- Pefferlaw, northwest
- Vroomanton, west
- Port Perry, southeast
- Uxbridge, southwest
- Cannington, northeast

== Transportation ==
- Ontario Highway 7 / Ontario Highway 12
- GO Bus 81, Connecting Sunderland to Whitby GO Station
- Small private registered aerodrome located 2 nautical miles (3.7 km; 2.3 mi) west of town (CSD7 - Sunderland Aerodrome)

== Other information ==
- Area code: +(00)1-705
- Postal code: L0C 1H0

There are about 30 homes on the extreme south-west corner of Brock Township with (rural route) Sunderland mailing addresses and a 905 North American area code.
