= Ontario Highway 103 =

Former Ontario provincial highway

Highway 103
- Highway 103 1944–1958 route Highway 12 concurrency (1965-1973)

Route information
- Maintained by the Ministry of Transportation of Ontario
- Length: 58.3 km (36.2 mi)
- Existed: July 11, 1944–May 15, 1976

Major junctions
- South end: Highway 69 in Foot's Bay
- North end: Highway 12 in Waubaushene

Location
- Country: Canada
- Province: Ontario
- Divisions: Simcoe County, Muskoka District

Highway system
- Ontario provincial highways; Current; Former; 400-series
← Highway 102	→ Highway 105
Former provincial highways
Highway 104 →

King's Highway 103, commonly referred to as Highway 103, was a provincially maintained highway in the Canadian province of Ontario. Located in the District Municipality of Muskoka and Simcoe County, the highway extended from Highway 12 at Waubaushene to Highway 69 at Foot's Bay. Established in 1944, it was originally a short gravel highway connecting Waubaushene to Port Severn. In 1950 it was chosen as the future route of the Trans-Canada Highway and extended to Foot's Bay. It existed until 1976, when a series of renumberings eliminated the designation, replacing it with Highway 69; Highway 400 has since been built over the majority of the former route.

== Route description ==
Highway 103 followed much of the route that Highway 400 now takes between Highway 12 at Coldwater and the former Highway 69 junction (Exit 189) south of Mactier. From there it followed what is now the east–west section of Lake Joseph Road to Foot's Bay, where it ended what was Highway 69, later Highway 169, and is presently Muskoka District Road 169 and the north–south section of Lake Joseph Road. Between Highway 400 and Foot's Bay, it is now designated as both Lake Joseph Road and Muskoka District Road 169. Between Coldwater and Waubaushene, the route was concurrent with Highway 12 for a brief period in the mid-1960s. From there, it crossed over Matchedash Bay and circled around the south and eastern shoreline of Sturgeon Bay to Port Severn. North of Port Severn, the route travelled through wilderness within the District of Muskoka for 38 kilometres (24 mi). At Foot's Bay, it encountered Highway 69, which continued east to Highway 11 in Gravenhurst and north to Parry Sound and Sudbury.

== History ==
Highway 103 was first designated during World War II as a stub route of Highway 12 from Waubaushene to Port Severn. The 10.3 kilometres (6.4 mi) highway was assumed on July 19, 1944. The original routing until the late 1950s followed what is now Pine Street, Coldwater Road and Duck Bay Road through Waubaushene. After crossing Matchedash Bay, the route turned onto Quarry Road, then turned north and followed what is now the northbound lanes of Highway 400 straight into Port Severn. It turned west along Port Severn Road across the Trent–Severn Waterway and ended at Lone Pine Road. The entire route was gravel surfaced. Beginning in 1956, Highway 501 continued west to Honey Harbour.

When Ontario signed the Trans-Canada Highway Agreement on April 25, 1950, it had already chosen a Central Ontario routing via Waubaushene and Parry Sound; Highway 17 through the Ottawa Valley was announced as a provincially-funded secondary route of the TCH the following day. The route of Highway 103 was chosen as a jump-off point to connect the two places. Tenders for building the approximately 40-kilometre (25 mi) extension from Port Severn to Highway 69 at Foot's Bay were called on September 25, 1953, and included bypasses of Waubaushene and Port Severn. Construction was underway by the following year. The new paved Highway 103 was open by September 1958, although the complex three-bridge Port Severn Bypass did not open until the following spring. The old portions of the route through Waubaushene and Port Severn were transferred to Tay Township on January 29, 1959.

In order to provide better route continuity for motorists travelling from Toronto to Sudbury, several highways were renumbered in the Muskoka area on May 15, 1976. The section of Highway 69 between Foot's Bay and its southern terminus of Highway 12 at Brechin was redesignated as Highway 169, while the entirety of Highway 103 was renumbered to form the new southern portion of Highway 69. The entirety of the former route (with the exception of the east–west section of Lake Joseph Road/Muskoka Road 169 west of Foot's Bay) has now been superseded by Highway 400.

== Major intersections ==
The following table lists the major junctions along Highway 103, as noted by the Ontario Department of Highways. The route is documented as it existed in 1968.

Division	Location	km	mi	Destinations	Notes
Simcoe	Coldwater	0.0	0.0	Highway 12 south – Orillia	Beginning of Highway 12 concurrency between 1965 and 1968
Simcoe	Waubaushene	8.9	5.5	Highway 12 north – Midland	End of Highway 12 concurrency, 1965 to 1968
Simcoe	Port Severn	14.8	9.2	Port Severn Cutoff	
Muskoka	Port Severn	17.2	10.7	Highway 501 (Honey Harbour Road)	Now District Road 5
Muskoka	Georgian Bay	39.9	24.8	Highway 660	
Muskoka	Georgian Bay	56.6	35.2	Highway 612	
Muskoka	Foot's Bay	58.3	36.2	Highway 69 – Gravenhurst, Parry Sound	
1.000 mi = 1.609 km; 1.000 km = 0.621 mi
