= Dr S.J. Phillips Public School =

Public elementary school in Oshawa, Ontario, Canada

Coordinates: 43.9139°N 78.8703°W

Location
- 625 Simcoe Street North; Oshawa, Ontario, L1G 4V5; Canada

Information
- Former name: North Simcoe Public School
- Type: Public
- Established: 1924
- Status: Open
- School board: Durham District School Board
- Superintendent: Micheal Bowman
- Principal: Christine Mackey
- Mascot: Phillips Falcon
- Website: https://phillips.ddsb.ca
- Last updated: 4 June 2026

Dr. S.J. Phillips Public School (known as North Simcoe School pre-1961) is a public elementary school in Oshawa, Ontario, Canada.

== History ==
Dr. S.J. Phillips Public School (then North Simcoe School) initially opened in 1924, located at the southeast corner of Simcoe Street North and Rossland Road West.

Upon the schools opening, the first principal was Jean Garrow.

== See also ==
- Durham District School Board
- Education in Ontario
