= Dr. F. J. Donevan Collegiate Institute =

Dr F J Donevan Collegiate Institute

Location
- 250 Harmony Road South; Oshawa, Ontario, L1H 6T9; Canada
- Coordinates: 43.89742°N 78.8318°W

Information
- School type: Public
- Founded: 1958-2010
- Status: Demolished
- School board: Durham District School Board
- Grades: 9-12
- Enrollment: 681 (2009)
- Language: English
- Website: web.archive.org/web/20091218110812/http://donevan.ddsbschools.ca:80/

Dr F J Donevan Collegiate Institute was located in Oshawa, Ontario, within the Durham District School Board. The school had students in grades 9–12 and offered a wide range of academic and extracurricular activities.

== Sports ==
Donevan Collegiate supported numerous male and female sports clubs including ice hockey, volleyball, basketball, soccer, lacrosse, tennis, badminton, etc. The Senior Boys Volleyball team captured AA LOSSA (Lake Ontario Secondary School Athletics) championships in both the 2006 and 2007 seasons, earning the team the opportunity to compete in the OFSAA (Ontario Federation of School Athletic Associations) tournament both years. Donevan's ice hockey team also fared well over the years, with the Junior Boys team capturing the AA LOSSA championship in the 2004/05 season.

== Ontario Secondary School Literacy Test (OSSLT) results ==
Donevan performed well on the 2008 OSSLT (Literacy Test), increasing overall results by 6% while the Board dropped 1% from the previous year. Overall, with Donevan's greater number of Applied and Essential-stream students, the whole school results show 78% of students successful (School Board average, 84%).

Results for Applied-stream students increased by 9% while those for Academic-stream students improved by 6% over the previous year.

Comparatively, Donevan outperformed the Board in the three major streams: Academic 96% (Board 95%), Applied 67% (Board 62%), Essential 35% (Board 28%). With the weighting of Donevan's greater number of Applied and Essential-stream students affecting the average, overall results are quite promising.

== History ==
Donevan first opened in 1958 and had an addition added on in 1970 which gave it a bigger cafeteria, a bigger library, and more classrooms. On May 17, 2010, the school board review committee voted to close the school at the end of the 2009–2010 school year.
