= Ontario Highway 501 =

Former Ontario provincial highway

Highway 501

Route information
- Maintained by the Ministry of Transportation and Communications
- Length: 13.1 km (8.1 mi)
- Existed: 1956–c. 1972

Major junctions
- South end: Highway 103 – Port Severn
- North end: Honey Harbour

Location
- Country: Canada
- Province: Ontario

Highway system
- Ontario provincial highways; Current; Former; 400-series
← Highway 500	→ Highway 502

Secondary Highway 501, commonly referred to as Highway 501, was a provincially maintained secondary highway in the Canadian province of Ontario. The highway was 13.1 kilometres (8.1 mi) long, connecting Highway 103 north of Port Severn with Honey Harbour.

Highway 501 was first assumed by the Department of Highways (DHO), predecessor to the Ministry of Transportation of Ontario, in 1956, along with most secondary highways in Ontario. In the early 1970s, the route was transferred to the newly established District Municipality of Muskoka and has since been known as Muskoka Road 5, or Honey Harbour Road. Today Muskoka Road 5 is accessed from Highway 400 at exit 156.

== Route description ==
The route of Highway 501 was, and remains, a short access road to summer cottages and islands along the rugged Georgian Bay shoreline, and the small port of Honey Harbour. The area, known for its scenic granite outcroppings, overlays the southern fringe of the Canadian Shield. Beginning at Port Severn, west of the modern Highway 400 interchange (exit 156) at what is now Violet Drive, the route travelled west for 1.3 kilometres (0.81 mi) to a crossroads, then proceeded north. This crossroad is now bypassed by a gradual curve. Continuing north, the route generally followed the current alignment of Muskoka Road 5, except between Bass Bay Road and Sunset Lane, where a former alignment lies in the forest east of the current road. The route meandered north and westward through the forest before entering Honey Harbour. The designation ended at the marina entrance in town.

== History ==
The route of Highway 501 was first assumed by the DHO in early 1956, along with several dozen other secondary highways. It was likely maintained as a development road prior to that. It connected Port Severn with Honey Harbour along a 13.1 kilometres (8.1 mi) route. The route remained unchanged as Highway 103 was built into Muskoka, a corridor now occupied by Highway 400. The creation of the District Municipality of Muskoka on January 1, 1971, resulted in the province transferring responsibility for secondary highways to the district. By 1973, Highway 501 had been redesignated as Muskoka Road 5, as it remains today.

== Major intersections ==
The following table lists the major junctions along Highway 501, as noted by the Ontario Department of Highways. The entire route was located in the District Municipality of Muskoka.

Location	km	mi	Destinations	Notes
Port Severn	0.0	0.0	Highway 103 – Port Severn	Now Highway 400 exit 156
Georgian Bay	8.1	5.0	District Road 48 (South Bay Road)	
Honey Harbour	13.1	8.1		Highway ended at marina entrance
1.000 mi = 1.609 km; 1.000 km = 0.621 mi
