= Ontario Highway 93 =

Ontario provincial highway

Highway 93
- Penetanguishene Road; Sarah Burke Memorial Highway
- Highway 93 highlighted in red

Route information
- Maintained by the Ministry of Transportation of Ontario
- Length: 24.1 km (15.0 mi)
- Existed: April 13, 1938–present

Major junctions
- South end: Highway 400 near Hillsdale
- North end: Highway 12 in Midland

Location
- Country: Canada
- Province: Ontario

Highway system
- Ontario provincial highways; Current; Former; 400-series
← Highway 89	→ Highway 94
Former provincial highways
← Highway 92

King's Highway 93, commonly referred to as Highway 93, is a provincially maintained highway in the Canadian province of Ontario. Located entirely within Simcoe County, the highway extends 23.9 kilometres (14.9 mi) from an interchange with Highway 400 in Springwater, just south of the community of Hillsdale, to an intersection with Highway 12 at the town limits of Midland. The route follows the historic Penetanguishene Road, an early colonization road which served to connect Lake Simcoe with Georgian Bay, thus providing an overland route from Lake Huron to Lake Ontario via Yonge Street.

Prior to 1997, the highway was nearly twice as long, extending 15 kilometres (9.3 mi) further south to meet Highway 11 and Highway 400A at Crown Hill (just north of Barrie, and seven kilometres further north to Penetanguishene. Because the southern leg paralleled Highway 400 just two kilometres to the east, and the northern segment carried primarily municipal traffic in Penetanguishene and Midland, both segments were transferred to Simcoe County that year. They were subsequently designated Simcoe County Road 93. On March 26, 2014, it was announced that the route would be renamed the Sarah Burke Memorial Highway, in memory of freestyle ski pioneer Sarah Burke.

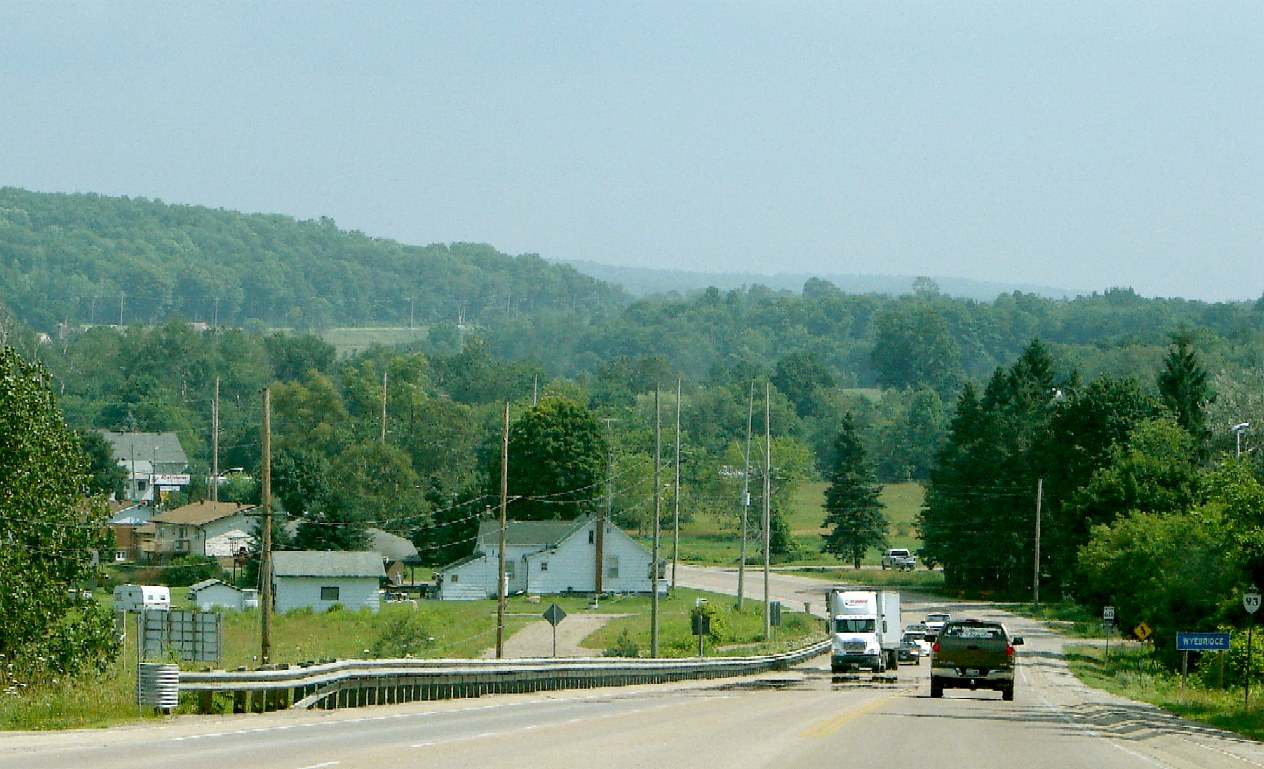
Highway 93 at Wyebridge

== Route description ==
In its current form, Highway 93 begins at an interchange with Highway 400; Exit 121. The highway previously continued south of there to an interchange with Highway 11 and what was then the unsigned Highway 400A, where Highway 11 left the present RIRO expressway to continue south through Barrie as a continuation of the course of Highway 93 and the southernmost part of the historic Penetanguishene Road, but this is now designated Simcoe County Highway 93. From Highway 400, the route meanders north along Penetanguishene Road through Simcoe County. It passes through community of Hillsdale and skirts the eastern shoreline of Orr Lake, providing access to numerous cottages located around the lake. Between both Hillsdale and Orr Lake, as well as between Orr Lake and Waverley, the highway is almost entirely surrounded by coniferous forests, with occasional farmland and rural homes dotting the landscape. Within the community of Waverley, the route encounters the northern terminus of former Highway 27, now Simcoe County Road 27.

North of Waverley, the highway continues to meander north towards Georgian Bay, departing from the old Penetanguishene Road at Mertz's Corner. Rural residences line the route between the two communities, transitioning to a mix of forest and farmland. It curves around the western side of a large hill before entering the community of Wyebridge, where it crosses the Wye River. Several kilometres north of Wyebridge, Highway 93 ends southwest of Midland at Highway 12; the two share northern termini, although provincial maintenance ends 200 metres (660 ft) north of the intersection. It once continued north into Penetanguishene, ending at the shoreline of Penetanguishene Harbour in Georgian Bay.

== History ==
Highway 93 follows the historic Penetanguishene Road, which continues south into Barrie south of the former highway's terminus. The road was initially surveyed by Samuel Street Wilmot in 1808 but no construction commenced. The North West Company had suggested in 1811 for this route again, but it was not until the Siege of Detroit in 1813 that the project was expedited. This road was built between 1814 and 1815, led by Dr. William "Tiger" Dunlop, from the north side of Kempenfelt Bay (east of Barrie), to the townsite and Naval establishment at Penetanguishene on Georgian Bay; it was the first road constructed in what is now Simcoe County. The route was assumed by the Department of Highways (DHO, predecessor to the modern Ministry of Transportation) in 1937.

=== Penetanguishene Road ===
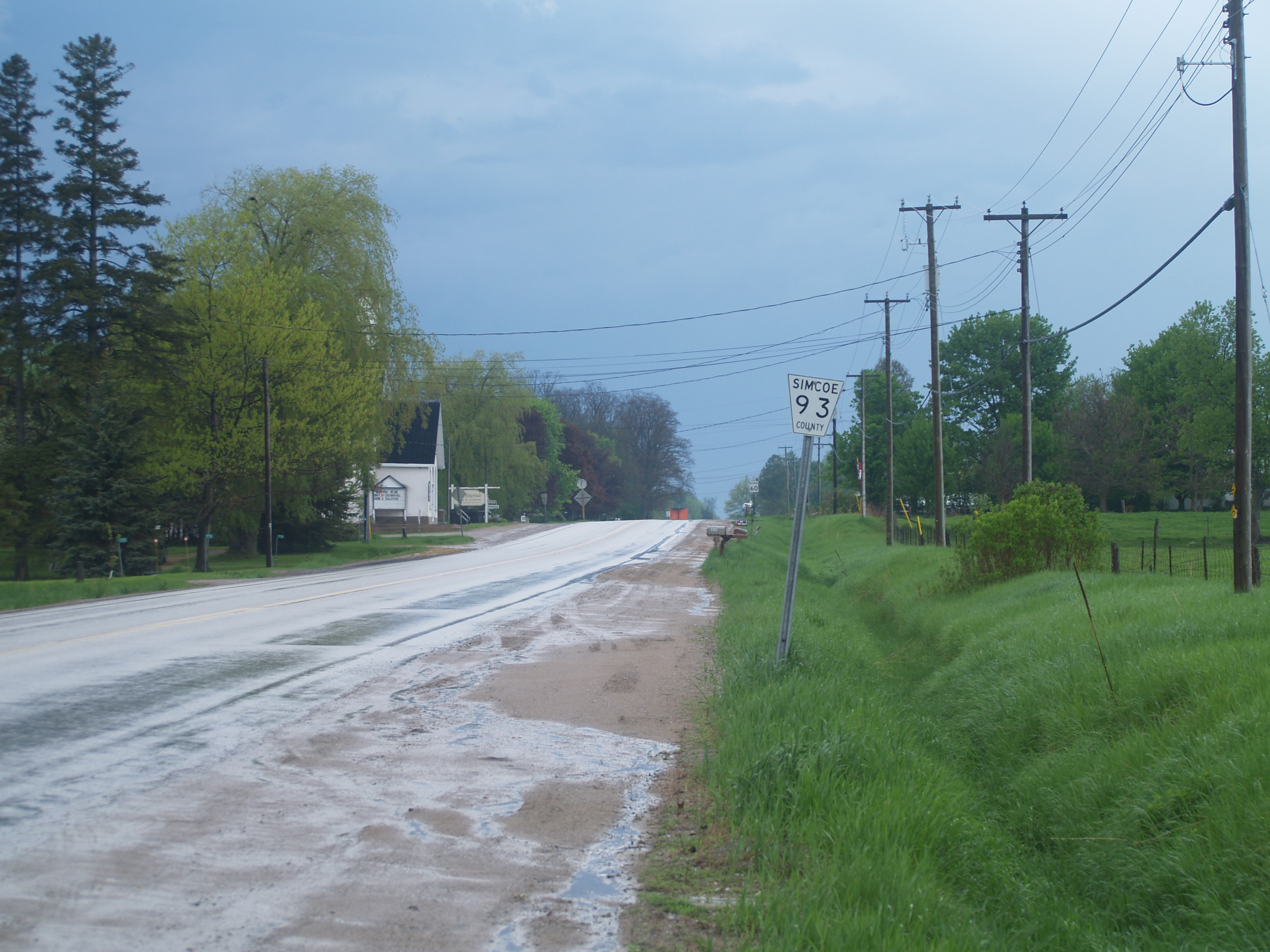
Highway 93 passed through the community of Dalston until 1997, when the section between Highway 11 and Highway 400 was downloaded to Simcoe County.

For several years the Holland River and Lake Simcoe provided the only means of transportation between York (now Toronto) and the upper Great Lakes; Holland Landing was the northern terminus of Yonge Street. The military route to Georgian Bay prior to, and during the War of 1812, crossed Lake Simcoe to the head of Kempenfelt Bay, then by the Nine Mile Portage to Willow Creek and the Nottawasaga River. The Penetanguishene Military Post was started before the war, however, lacking a suitable overland transport route, passage from York to Lake Huron continued via the Nottawasaga. The Penetanguishene Road replaced this route when the Naval Establishment was opened in 1818.

The route for the road was surveyed in 1808 by Samuel Wilmot. After the British captured Fort Michilimackinac in the War of 1812, the requirement to supply the captured fort created a need for ships to be built on Lake Huron, which in turn meant that an effective supply route needed to be cut. The decision was made to cut the road in November 1814 by General Gordon Drummond. It was completed by the following spring. Following the war, the surrounding land was purchased in the Lake Simcoe–Lake Huron Purchase from the Chippeway First Nation and the road opened for settlement. It was treated specially by the crown land office in that the strategic value of the route to the naval base led to the road being preferred for military settlers. Large numbers of soldiers who had served in Canada or elsewhere throughout the British Empire were settled along the road and in the vicinity of Penetanguishene, as well as pensioners from Chelsea Hospital. Many of the commuted pensioners were reduced to a state of extreme poverty.

In 1824, construction began to extend Penetanguishene Road south (with a U-shaped course around Kempenfelt Bay) to with connect with Yonge Street at Holland Landing. Completed in 1827 to the bay, the southern part of this extension was later redesignated as part of Yonge Street after the two sections were severed when the route through Barrie became incorporated into several perpendicular streets as the city grew. This portion of the Penetanguishene Road, as well as the present remaining section and the connecting streets south of the expressway portion of Highway 11, became a part of Highway 11 in 1920.

=== Provincial highway ===
Highway 93 was first assumed by the DHO on April 13, 1938, serving as an alternate route for Highway 27. The 28.2-kilometre (17.5 mi) gravel-surfaced highway began at Highway 11 at Crown Hill and ended at Highway 27 in Waverley; Highway 27 continued north along Penetanguishene Road. It was paved between Craighurst and Waverley in 1956, and between Crown Hill and Craighurst in 1960.

Meanwhile, Highway 400 was opened as a two lane freeway with an at-grade intersection at Highway 93 between Craighurst and Hillsdale on December 24, 1959. The freeway was twinned to four lanes and an interchange built at Highway 93 in the early 1980s, opening in 1982. The now-renamed Ministry of Transportation and Communications also renumbered several highways in Simcoe County to coincide with this, including redesignating Highway 27 between Waverley and Midland as part of Highway 93. This brought the highway to its peak length of 46.5 kilometres (28.9 mi).

As part of a series of budget cuts initiated by premier Mike Harris under his Common Sense Revolution platform in 1995, numerous highways deemed to no longer be of significance to the provincial network were decommissioned and responsibility for the routes transferred to a lower level of government, a process referred to as downloading. The 15.3-kilometre (9.5 mi) section of Highway 93 parallel to Highway 400 was determined to be redundant and was consequently downloaded to Simcoe County on April 1, 1997. The 7.3-kilometre (4.5 mi) section north of Highway 12 into Penetanguishene primarily served local traffic and was downloaded on the same day. Both downloaded sections are now known as Simcoe County Road 93.

The province dedicated the entire length of Highway 93 as the Sarah Burke Memorial Highway on March 26, 2014. Burke was born in Barrie and grew up in Midland; the freestyle skier died in a training accident in January 2012.

== Major intersections ==
The following table lists the major junctions along Highway 93, as noted by the Ministry of Transportation of Ontario. The entire route is located in Simcoe County.

Location	km	mi	Destinations	Notes
Springwater–Oro-Medonte boundary	−15.3	−9.5	County Road 93 begins Penetanguishene Road – Barrie Highway 11 – Toronto, Orillia	Former Highway 93 southern terminus; formerly Highway 400A south (Note: Highway 400A was unsigned as such but was instead signed as Highway 400 southbound and Highway 11 northbound until the latter was decommissioned south of the interchange and 400A redesignated as a new southern routing of 11 to meet Highway 400 directly)
Springwater–Oro-Medonte boundary	0.0	0.0	Highway 400 – Barrie, Parry Sound Highway 93 begins County Road 93 ends	Highway 93 southern terminus; Highway 400 exit 121
Springwater	7.6	4.7	County Road 19 (South Orr Lake Road / Moonstone Road)	
Waverley	12.7	7.9	County Road 27 south – Elmvale; County Road 23 east – Coldwater	Formerly Highway 27 south
Midland	23.9	14.9	Highway 12 south – Orillia	
Midland	24.1	15.0	Highway 93 ends County Road 93 begins	Highway 93 northern terminus 200 m (660 ft) north of Highway 12
Penetanguishene	31.2	19.4	Robert Street County Road 93 ends Main Street	Former Highway 93 northern terminus
1.000 mi = 1.609 km; 1.000 km = 0.621 mi: Closed/former; Route transition
