= Maxwell Heights Secondary School =

Coordinates: 43.9455°N 78.8506°W

Location
- 1100 Coldstream Drive; Oshawa, Ontario, L1K 0N1; Canada

Information
- School type: Public
- School board: Durham District School Board
- Principal: Saamah Jadoon
- Grades: 9-12
- Enrolment: 1,600 (2019/2020)
- Language: English
- Website: www.ddsb.ca/school/maxwellheights/Pages/default.aspx

Maxwell Heights Secondary School is a Canadian high school located in Oshawa, Ontario, within the Durham District School Board. The school was established in September 2009 and is named after a previous school, Maxwell Heights Public School (1955–1995). The school runs on the Modified School Calendar, starting a week earlier than schools on the traditional calendar, and closing for one week in November.

== See also ==
- Education in Ontario
- List of secondary schools in Ontario
