= J. S. Slauson =

American land developer and politician

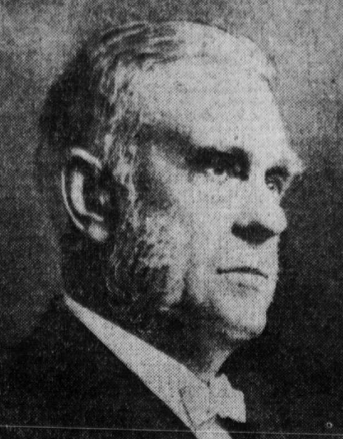
J. S. Slauson

Jonathan Sayre Slauson (1829–1905) was a land developer and politician in 19th century Southern California who was responsible for establishing the town of Azusa and being the mayor of Austin, Nevada.

== Biography ==
=== Early years ===
Slauson was born in Orange County, New York, on December 11, 1829. He went to an academy in Poughkeepsie, New York, completed school at the age of sixteen and then studied law, first with a private attorney and then at the New York State Law School, from which he graduated in 1854.

Slauson spent nine years as an attorney in New York City, but ill health impelled him to move to Austin, Nevada, in 1864, where he became a miner and was also elected mayor. Later, he resumed his law practice, this time in partnership with Charles E. De Long. Between 1868 and 1874 he lived with his family in San Francisco, California.

In the latter year the Slausons moved to Los Angeles, where he founded the Los Angeles County Bank, which he sold to John E. Plater.

Slauson purchased about 5,800 acres of land east of Los Angeles and was once called "the father of citrus fruit culture in the foothill region" and "the father of the town of Azusa" because of his holdings in the Azusa region. In 1886, he sold half the acreage to J. D. Bicknell, I. W. Hellman and others and retained 800 acres, which he incorporated as the Azusa Land and Water Company and laid out the design of a town. He also planted "Orange and lemon trees of the choicest budded varieties." He also became a landowner in Ontario, California, and in Los Angeles.

Slauson, who was president of the Los Angeles Chamber of Commerce and the Sunset Club, a social organization, contributed to establishing and assisting churches throughout Southern California. His other charities included the Boys' Home at Garvanza, the Los Angeles YMCA, a Los Angeles orphan asylum, the Salvation Army Rescue Home, and he raised a fund for the erection of a monument to Spanish–American War veterans in Central Park, now known as Pershing Square.

He was elected to the Los Angeles Board of Education on December 5, 1904, for a two-year term, but he resigned on September 23, 1905.

Slauson died December 28, 1905, and was survived by three children, Mrs. Louise Marshall (wife of Hugh Livingstone Macneil), Mrs. Kate Vosburg and James Slauson. Thousands of people attended along the route of the funeral cortege and in the vestibule of the City Hall, where Slauson's body lay in state. The procession to St. Paul's Pro-Cathedral was accompanied by a detachment of militia. After a private service at the family home, 2345 South Figueroa Street, interment was at Angelus-Rosedale Cemetery.

=== Slauson Avenue ===
The street Slauson Avenue in Los Angeles, was posthumously named and dedicated to him.
