= Uxbridge Secondary School =

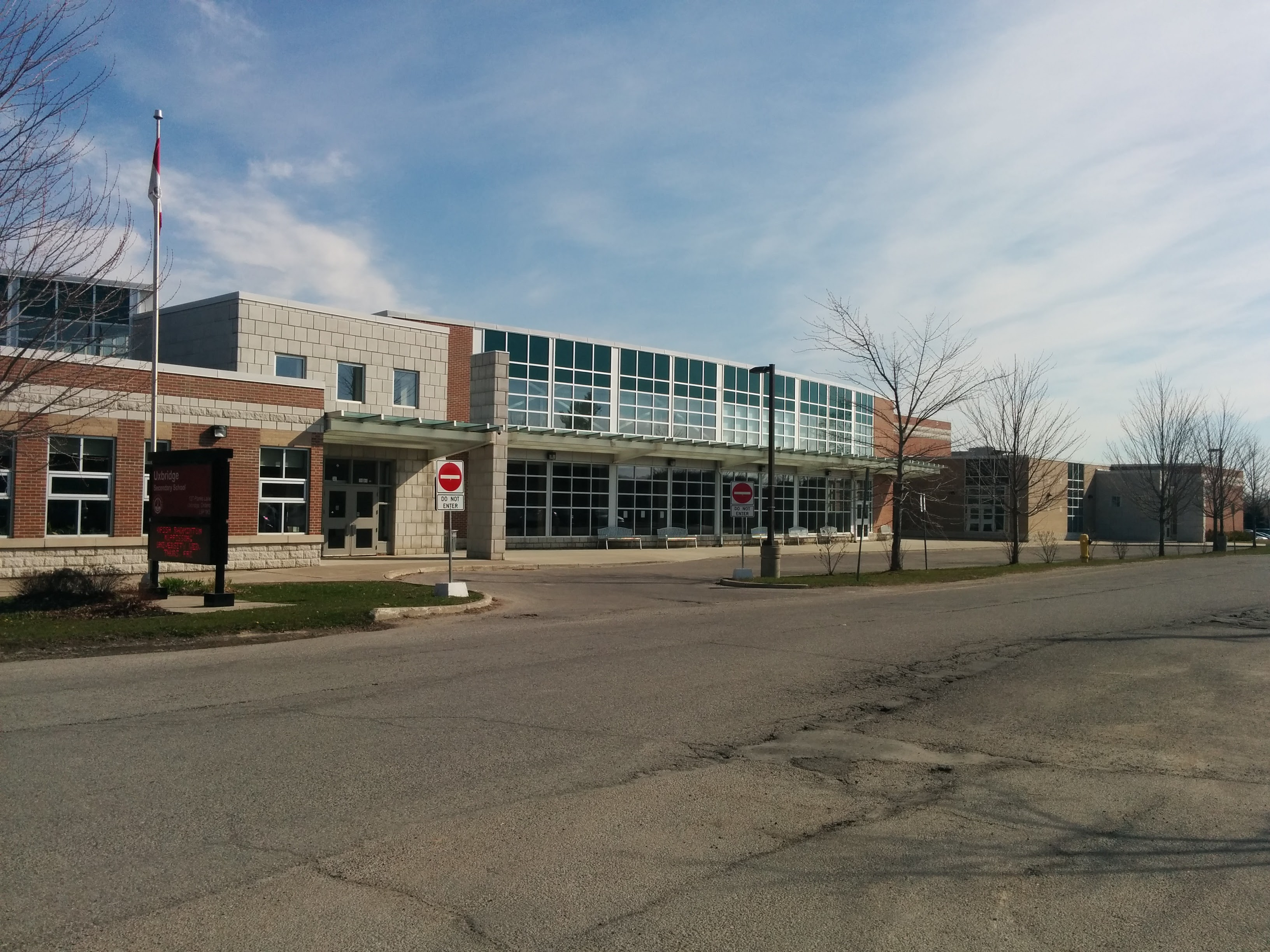
- Uxbridge Secondary in 2016

Location
- 127 Planks Lane; Uxbridge, Ontario, L9P 1K5; Canada; 44°6′33″N 79°6′49″W

Information
- Former name: Uxbridge High School
- School type: Public Secondary School
- Motto: Per ardua ad astra (Through struggle to the stars)
- Founded: 1872
- School board: Durham District School Board
- Superintendent: Mohamed Hamid
- Area trustee: Carolyn Morton
- Principal: Melissa Lee
- Grades: 9-12
- Enrolment: 1,020 (2023/2024)
- Language: English
- Colours: Black and Gold
- Mascot: Tiger
- Feeder schools: Claremont Public School, Goodwood Public School, Joseph Gould Public School, St. Joseph Caltholic School, Scott Central Public School, Quaker Village Public School, Uxbridge Public School
- Alumni: Steve Stevens
- Website: uxbridgess.ddsb.ca/en/index.aspx

Uxbridge Secondary School (U.S.S.) is a high school in the Township of Uxbridge, Ontario, and is one of 18 high schools within the Durham District School Board. The school has students from grades 9–12 and offers a wide range of academic and extracurricular activities.

== History and development ==
Originally called Uxbridge High School opened in 1872 opposite the then Methodist and now Trinity United Church on First Avenue. The school replaced the Grammar School that opened in 1856. The second school building was erected from 1923 to 1925 and has undergone five major additions since then in 1965, 1979, 1985, 2003, and 2013. The building as it stands today has 81 classrooms, two gymnasiums, a cafeteria, a learning commons/library, and numerous staff and maintenance areas. At one point, there were 13 portables on site, including a "portapack", but these have largely been replaced with a new extension to the school.

== Athletics ==
The Uxbridge Tigers have earned many awards on Cross-country running and rugby. In 2011, the senior boys won gold at the "AAAA" OFSAA rugby final. During the 2013 OFSAA cross country Finals, the senior girls placed first, achieving a gold medal. 2015-2016 Senior Boys Rugby 15's "AAA" OFSAA champions. 2015-2016 Senior Girls Volleyball "AAA" OFSAA champions. 2015-2016 Senior Boys Volleyball "AAA" OFSAA consolation champions. During the 2024–2025 season, the boys' curling team captured the silver medal at the "AAA" OFSAA Provincial Championship.

== See also ==
- Education in Ontario
- List of secondary schools in Ontario
