= Hugh Livingstone Macneil =

American rancher (1850–1901)

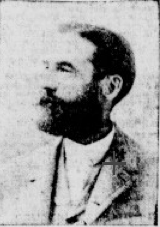
- Born: August 9, 1850; Wick, Canada West
- Died: October 21, 1901 (aged 51); Los Angeles, California
- Resting place: Rosedale Cemetery
- Spouse: Louise Slauson (m. 1884)

Hugh Livingstone Macneil (August 9, 1850 – October 21, 1901) was a pioneer rancher and town developer in southern California.

== Early years ==
Macneil was born in the town of Wick, Canada West, in 1850. He received a high school education and made plans for college, but the death of his father ended those plans. After a few years of experience in the business life of his Canada, Macneil removed to Chicago, where, in the capacity of cashier and auditor, he connected himself with the firm of Ingraham, Corbln & May, wholesale grocers.

== Career ==
The Chicago climate proving too severe, Macneil, in 1876, traveled to California. Lingering a short time in San Francisco, with a letter of introduction from Mr. A. N. Towne, then at the head of the Southern Pacific in that city, he came to Los Angeles. Here, he became connected with the Los Angeles County Bank as cashier. In 1887, he left the bank and spent four years in association with his father-in-law, Jonathan Sayre Slauson, in various land developments. As one of the owners of the Maclay Rancho, in the San Fernando Valley, he took an active part in developing and selling the land of the Rancho. The town of San Fernando, California, stands on this land. He acquired a large acreage where the towns of Ontario and Upland are located, soon after the Chaffeys had organized the Ontario colony, and assisted in promoting and establishing both of these cities. Macneil was also associated with J. S. Slauson, James Slauson and others in organizing the Azusa Land and Water Company, which, in April, 1887, established the town of Azusa. Macneil, in 1891, took up his residence there and for the next few years devoted himself to planting orange and lemon lands, the development and transportation of water from the San Gabriel Canon, and the early organization of the Southern California Fruit Exchange. He died in Los Angeles in 1901. He was the first president of the Caledonian Club, one of the early presidents of the California Club of Los Angeles, a charter member of the Los Angeles Athletic Club, and was also a member of the Creel Club and of the Sunset Club. He was for four years a California Fish and Game Commissioner.

== Personal life ==
He was a Republican and a Presbyterian. In Los Angeles, on September 17, 1884, he married Louise Slauson. There were two children, a daughter, Marion, and a son, Sayre (born 1886).

== Bibliography ==
- McGroarty, John Steven (1921). Los Angeles from the Mountains to the Sea: With Selected Biography of Actors and Witnesses to the Period of Growth and Achievement (Public domain ed.). American Historical Society.
