= Ajax High School =

Location
- 105 Bayly Street East; Durham Region; Ajax, Ontario, Ontario, L1S 1P2; Canada; 43°50′40″N 79°00′50″W

Information
- School type: High School
- Established: 1956
- School board: Durham District School Board
- School number: 905-683-1610
- Principal: Eijaz Ladhani
- Years offered: Grade 9-12
- Enrolment: 1,174 (2023-2024)
- Language: English, French Immersion
- Hours in school day: 6 Hours
- Colours: Blue and White
- Mascot: Ramy The Ram
- Team name: Rams
- Website: ajaxhs.ddsb.ca/en/index.aspx

Ajax High School (AHS) is located in Ajax, Ontario, Canada within the Durham District School Board. It is the largest secondary school in southern Ajax and the fourth-largest in all of Ajax. The school offers a wide range of academic and extracurricular activities. The school also offers a French Immersion program. Ajax High School was given a 5.5 (out of 10) rating in 2012/13 and ranked 478th out of 740 schools across Ontario. The schools official mascot is Ramy The Ram and the official colours are blue and white.

The school was opened in 1956 and has since undergone several large expansions. In the 1960s, a large section that today houses the main office, cafetorium, front entrance, courtyard, as well as several classrooms, was added. Later, in the early 2000s, a wing was added to the east side of the building. Many of these classrooms are now devoted to mathematics and science courses. The school also hosts a football field that is shared with surrounding schools.

== See also ==
- Education in Ontario
- List of secondary schools in Ontario
