= Eastdale Collegiate and Vocational Institute =

Location
- 265 Harmony Road North; Oshawa, Ontario, L1G 6L4; Canada; 43.9118°N 78.8360°W

Information
- School type: Public, High school
- Motto: Engage, Enrich, Empower
- Founded: 1966
- School board: Durham District School Board
- School number: (905) 723-8157
- Principal: Karla Torrente
- Grades: 9-12
- Enrolment: 1400 (2024/2025)
- Language: English
- Colours: Navy Blue and Gold
- Mascot: Ernie The Eagle
- Website: eastdalecvi.ddsb.ca

Eastdale Collegiate and Vocational Institute is located in Oshawa, Ontario within the Durham District School Board. The school has students in grades 9-12 and offers a wide range of academic and extracurricular activities. Eastdale offers courses in construction, communications, and manufacturing technology, as well as technical design.

Eastdale Collegiate and Vocational Institute has a Performing Arts Program called the Eastdale School of Theatre, Music, and Dance. This program allows students from Grade 9 to 12 to focus on two areas of general arts study while completing their Ontario Secondary School Diploma.

This Performing Arts program also allows students to expand their arts experience by linking to the Ministry of Education - Ontario's Specialist High Skills Major Pathway program in Arts and Culture. Created in 2008, this Specialist High Skills Major allows students to focus on applied or performing arts while experiencing "Reach Ahead" activities.

Eastdale CVI is home to the Eastdale Theatre Company, an organization that began in the late 1970s to produce musical productions. Performances have included FAME (2002), How to Succeed in Business Without Really Trying (2003), Once Upon a Mattress (2004), Grease (2005), The Sound of Music (2006), The Wizard of Oz (2007), Footloose (2008), Crazy For You (2009), The Music Man (2010), Peter Pan (2011), Back to the 80s (2012), and Little Shop of Horrors (2014). During the summer of 2005, the theatre company partnered with Summerstock Calgary to organize a performance of "Guys & Dolls", which performed at Parkwood and Yonge-Dundas Square.

The Eastdale Theatre Company remained an extra-curricular from its beginning right to 2012's "Back to the 80s". In 2013, the E.T.C. took a brief intermission. The musicals begun their second act as an accredited course. The inaugural production of this brand-new theatre programme was 2014's "Little Shop of Horrors".

In September 2010, Eastdale CVI and Dr. F. J. Donevan Collegiate merged after lengthy public consultation by the ARC Committee of the Durham District School Board. The Elementary schools within Donevan's Family of Schools have now become part of Eastdale's Family of Schools and, as such, will participate in Eastdale's academic initiatives.

== See also ==
- Education in Ontario
- List of secondary schools in Ontario
