= Pine Ridge Secondary School =

Location
- 2155 Liverpool Road North; Pickering, Ontario, L1X 1V4; Canada; 43.85213°N 79.09596°W

Information
- School type: Public secondary school
- Motto: Maxime Semper Facimus (We always do our best)
- Founded: September 8, 1992
- School board: Durham District School Board
- Superintendent: Martine Robinson
- Area trustee: Emma Cunningham; Stephen Linton
- School number: 935360
- Principal: Monique Muller
- Grades: 9–12
- Enrolment: 965 (2021/2022)
- Language: English
- Mascot: Puma
- Feeder schools: Bayview Heights Public School; Glengrove Public School; Maple Ridge Public School; Sir John A. Macdonald Public School; Valley Farm Public School; Valley View Public School; Vaughan Willard Public School; Trillium Woods Public School; William Dunbar Public School
- Public transit access: Durham Regional Transit
- Website: pineridgess.ddsb.ca

Pine Ridge Secondary School is a public secondary school located in Pickering, Ontario operating within the Durham District School Board. It serves students in grades 9 through 12. The building has three stories with the third story having two wings, the north and the south wing. The mascot is the Puma.

== Location ==
The school is situated outside a natural conservation area. It was built on September 8, 1992, and originally had 60 classrooms. In 2001, the school underwent major renovations to accommodate 20 additional classrooms.

== Stabbing ==
On January 17, 2018, a stabbing occurred at the school. A 16-year-old female student, a 17-year-old girl, and a 16-year-old male student (whose identities are protected by the Youth Criminal Justice Act) were arrested as a result of the stabbing.

== Achievements ==
In 2007, then-principal Sarah McDonald was named one of Canada's Outstanding Principals by the Learning Partnership and the Canadian Association of Principals.

In 2012, the province of Ontario awarded the school with its Premier's Safe School Award.

== Notable alumni ==
- Perdita Felicien, champion hurdler
- Shawn Mendes, singer-songwriter
- Chris Van Vliet, Canadian television/radio personality

== See also ==
- Education in Ontario
- List of secondary schools in Ontario
