= Vroomanton =

- Ghost town
- Interactive map of Vroomanton
- Coordinates: 44°16′32″N 79°7′1″W
- Country: Canada
- Province: Ontario
- Regional municipality: Durham
- Township: Brock Township, Ontario
- Time zone: UTC-5 (EST)
  - Summer (DST): UTC-4 (EDT)
- Forward sortation area: L??
- Area code: Area code 705
- NTS Map: 031D06
- GNBC Code: FDAFO

Vroomanton is a ghost town located just north-west of Sunderland in Brock Township, Ontario.

The farming town was founded by Colonel James Vrooman, who was granted free land here in 1820 for his heroic service in the War of 1812. (The Vrooman family- namely brother Solomon Vrooman's- participation in the Battle of Queenston Heights was vital in the victory for the British over the Americans, as the cannon at Vrooman's Point kept over 4000 American troops from crossing the Niagara River). The son of Dutch settlers James was born here in 1796 at Queenston Heights. He is buried along with his 2 wives at the United Church cemetery at Conc. 7 and Sideroad 17A.

Other early settlers in the village were: Wilson, Glendenning, Oke, Shier, Keenan and Speiran.

The Vroomans played a major role in the village's development. Colonel Vrooman offered land to John Gelbrae to build a grist mill on Vrooman Creek. Prior to this settlers had to walk 14 miles through the forest to the nearest grist mill in Uxbridge, Ontario with wheat bundles strapped to their backs. With the opening of the mills the population increased and soon the village had wooden sidewalks lined with shops

In its heyday the village had the two mills- a sawmill and gristmill, set-up where they dammed up the local Vrooman Creek and made a large pond. There was a school (built 1868), 2 churches, a post office (postmasters: M. McPhaden and N. Bolster), a hotel, 3 stores, a carriage shop, blacksmiths and an Orange Hall. These existed after the town plan was made with a total of 6 streets named: King, Queen, Simcoe, Nelson, Victoria and Brock. At its height the population was about 200.

Unfortunately as the village prospered the railway lines (Toronto and Nipissing Railway) did not come through. Instead, the lines came through at Sunderland, Ontario in 1871. Sunderland was a smaller village at the time, but quickly became the hub of Brock Township, Ontario, leaving Vroomanton to wither. Villagers moved away, buildings were torn down, until only the church, Orange Hall and school remained.

The Catholic Church on the east side of town was called St. Malachy's and was the central Catholic church for all of the former Ontario County (all the way to Uptergrove in the north). It had wooden shingles. An inspector warned the church to change the shingles as they were a fire hazard. On May 14, 1942, while the caretaker was burning leaves, a spark became lodged in a crack in the wooden shingles on the roof of St. Malachy's destroying its structure in a few hours. The story goes that asphalt shingles were purchased and stored in the basement waiting to be put on the roof. The Pastor, Father Toomey and the congregation thought that the damage was too great to repair so no new church was built in its place.

There are some remains of the past in this village. A very old wooden barn still stands rickety as can be on the main road behind some trees. The old school, built in 1868, has been lived in since 1972 at its original location at Queen and King Streets. The old Methodist Church is now a United Church, built in 1909 on the site of a previous wooden church built in 1854. Beside this church is the Vrooman's cemetery. An old wooden home decays beside the creek bridge. Queen Street and King Street are the village's only 2 remaining streets of its original six.
