= G. L. Roberts Collegiate and Vocational Institute =

G L Roberts Collegiate and Vocational Institute

Location
- 399 Chaleur Avenue; Oshawa, Ontario, L1J 1G5; Canada
- Coordinates: 43.8601°N 78.8454°W

Information
- School type: Public
- School board: Durham District School Board
- Principal: Jon Lepage (2024- )
- Grades: 9-12
- Enrolment: 435 (2019/2020)
- Language: English
- Website: glrobertscvi.ddsb.ca

G. L. Roberts Collegiate and Vocational Institute is located in Oshawa, Ontario within the Durham District School Board. The school has students in grades 9-12 and offers a wide range of academic and extracurricular activities. Opened in 1972, the school celebrated its 50th anniversary in 2022. The school offers a range of Specialist High Skills Major (SHSM) programs including Manufacturing Technology, Hospitality & Tourism, Environment, and Sport.

Sports at GL include Basketball, Volleyball, Rugby, Badminton, and Track & Field.

== Sports ==
- Boys Senior Basketball (Grades 11 & 12)
- Boys Junior Basketball (Grades 9 & 10)
- Girls Senior Basketball (Grades 11 & 12)
- Girls Junior Basketball (Grades 9 & 10)
- Boys Senior Soccer (Grades 11 & 12)
- Boys Junior Soccer (Grades 9 & 10)
- Girls Senior Soccer (Grades 11 & 12)
- Girls Junior Soccer (Grades 9 & 10)

== See also ==
- Education in Ontario
- List of secondary schools in Ontario
