= Thorah Township =

Former municipality in Brock, Ontario, Canada

Coordinates: 44°27′22″N 79°06′23″W

Thorah Township is a former municipality that today is a geographic township in Brock Township, in Central Ontario, Canada.

== History ==
The township was established in 1820. The origin of the name is unclear; it may have been named for the Pentateuch, the first five books of the Bible, known to those in the Jewish faith as the Torah. The Township was incorporated in 1850. The Village of Beaverton, originally part of the township, was incorporated as a separate municipality in 1884.

Part of the Trent–Severn Waterway was constructed through the northern portion of the Township and opened in 1907.

In 1974, Thorah was amalgamated with Brock Township and the Villages of Beaverton and Cannington to create an expanded Township of Brock.

== See also ==
- List of townships in Ontario
