= Brock, Ontario =

Brock
- Township (lower-tier)
- Township of Brock
- Beaverton Cannington Sunderland

- Coat of arms
- Interactive map of Brock
- Location within Regional Municipality of Durham Location within Southern Ontario
- Coordinates: 44°19′N 79°05′W
- Country: Canada
- Province: Ontario
- Region: Durham
- Incorporated: 1974

Government
  - Mayor: Michael Jubb
  - Councillors: List: Peter Frank; Claire Doble; Angela Canavan; Cria Pettingill; Lynn Campbell

Area
  - Total: 422.64 km^{2} (163.18 sq mi)

Population (2021)
  - Total: 12,567
  - Density: 29.735/km^{2} (77.012/sq mi)
- Time zone: UTC−05:00 (EST)
  - Summer (DST): UTC−04:00 (EDT)
- Website: www.townshipofbrock.ca

Brock is a township in the Regional Municipality of Durham, Ontario, Canada. Brock Township is also a former municipality and geographic township prior to the amalgamation that formed the current municipality. The Township of Brock is officially designated as the Smallmouth Bass Capital of Canada.

The Trent–Severn Waterway forms part of the northern border of the municipality, which enters Lake Simcoe through Ramara Township. There are five locks in Brock. Thorah Island in Lake Simcoe is within the municipal boundaries of Brock.

== History ==
The original Brock Township was surveyed in 1817 as part of York County and the first meetings were held in 1833. The township was named for Major General Sir Isaac Brock (1769–1812) whose estate received free land here for his service in the War of 1812. William Bagshaw became Brock's first Postmaster and Justice of the Peace in 1819 when he owned property on Concession 9. Other early, settler ancestors included names like: Acton, Charters, Dusto, Purvis, Rundle, Bagshaw, Doble, Phair, St. John, Umphrey, Brethour, Doyle, Fallowdown, Ruddy and Vrooman (for whom the semi-ghost town of Vroomanton was named).

In 1852, the Township became part of the newly created Ontario County. In 1878, Cannington was incorporated as a village and was no longer part of the Township for municipal purposes.

In 1974, Brock was amalgamated with Thorah Township and the villages of Beaverton and Cannington to form the new Township of Brock.

== Communities ==
Beaverton is the largest community and commercial centre of the township, while Cannington is home to the municipal administration and local high school.

Beaverton is the commercial and financial centre for the township, and several stores, services and entertainment facilities are located there.

Smaller communities in the township include Ball Subdivision, Blackwater, Cedar Beach, Creightons Corners, Derryville, Gamebridge, Layton, Maple Beach, Port Bolster, Pinedale, Saginaw, Sunderland, Thorah Beach, Vallentyne, Vroomanton, Wick and Wilfrid.

== Local Government ==
The municipal offices of Brock are located in Cannington

Brock is governed by a Mayor, a Regional Councillor and five Councillors, each representing one of the five municipal wards. As of the 2026 election the elected council members are:

- Mayor: Michael Jubb
- Regional Councillor: Peter Frank
- Councillors
  - Ward 1: Claire Doble
  - Ward 2: Diana Vessel
  - Ward 3: Mike Samis
  - Ward 4: Sally Morgan
  - Ward 5: Ted Smith

== Demographics ==
In the 2021 Census of Population conducted by Statistics Canada, Brock had a population of 12,567 living in 4,788 of its 5,297 total private dwellings, a change of 7.9% from its 2016 population of 11,642. With a land area of 422.64 km^{2} (163.18 sq mi), it had a population density of 29.7/km^{2} (77.0/sq mi) in 2021.

According to the 2016 Census, 94% of Brock residents have English as their mother tongue (one of the highest percentages in the Greater Toronto Area). No other mother tongue reaches 1%. The residents of Brock are older with a median age of 46.5 compared to the provincial average of 41.3.

Historical populations
Year	Pop.	±%
1991	11,057	—
1996	11,705	+5.9%
2001	12,110	+3.5%
2006	11,979	−1.1%
2011	11,341	−5.3%
2016	11,642	+2.7%
2021	12,567	+7.9%

== Notable people ==
- George Arthur Welsh – decorated World War I and World War II flying ace hero
- Duncan Macpherson – editorial cartoonist
- Basil McRae – former NHL player
- Hugh Livingstone Macneil – southern California pioneer, born in Wick

== See also ==
- List of townships in Ontario
