= Vroman, Nebraska =

Unincorporated community in Nebraska, United States

Coordinates: 40°58′01″N 100°15′26″W

Vroman is an unincorporated community in Lincoln County, Nebraska, United States.

== History ==
A post office was established at Vroman in 1887, and remained in operation until it was discontinued in 1903. The community was named for William Vroman, an early settler.
