= Durham District School Board =

School Board in Durham, Ontario

Address
- 400 Taunton Road East Whitby, Ontario, L1R 2K6; Canada
- Coordinates: 43.9198°N 78.9411°W

District information
- Type: School Board
- Motto: Ignite Learning
- Grades: K-12
- Chief executive officer: Camille Williams-Taylor
- Chair of the board: Tracy Brown
- Governing agency: Ministry of Education
- Schools: 167
- Budget: ~$6.7 billion (2025-2026)
- District ID: B66060

Students and staff
- Enrolment: ~58,200 (elementary); ~25,100 (secondary); ~83,300 (total)
- Staff: ~7,600
- Colours: Maroon, yellow, and blue

Other information
- Trustees: 11 elected trustees, 1 appointed First Nations trustee
- Student Trustees: 3 elected student trustees
- Website: www.ddsb.ca

The Durham District School Board (DDSB), known as English/French language Public District School Board No. 13 prior to 1999, is an English-language public-secular school board in the province of Ontario. The Board serves most of Durham Region, except for Clarington, which is a part of the Kawartha Pine Ridge District School Board.

The Board has more than 7,600 staff who serve approximately 58,200 elementary and 25,100 secondary school students. Its headquarters is located in Whitby.

Durham has four independent, coterminous boards, serving English (Durham District School Board), serving English-Catholic (Durham Catholic District School Board), French-secular (Conseil scolaire Viamonde), and French-Catholic (Conseil scolaire catholique MonAvenir) students.

The DDSB is located on the traditional and treaty territory of the Mississauga of Scugog Island First Nation, the Mississauga Peoples and the treaty territory of the Chippewas of Georgina Island First Nation.

== Land Acknowledgement ==
The Durham District School Board acknowledges that many Indigenous Nations have longstanding relationships, both historic and modern, with the territories upon which our school board and schools are located. Today, this area is home to many Indigenous peoples from across Turtle Island. We acknowledge that the Durham Region forms a part of the traditional and treaty territory of the Mississaugas of Scugog Island First Nation, the Mississauga Peoples and the treaty territory of the Chippewas of Georgina Island First Nation. It is on these ancestral and treaty lands that we teach, learn and live.

== History ==
The DDSB was created on January 1, 1974, as the Durham Region Board of Education (DRBE), succeeding the Ontario County Board of Education. In 1998, the DRBE was renamed the Durham District School Board, as it is known today. The francophone schools that were managed by the Board are now part of Conseil scolaire Viamonde.

At the same time as the creation of the DRBE, West Rouge became part of Scarborough, resulting in the transfer of a few schools to the then Scarborough Board of Education:

- West Rouge Public School;
- William G. Davis Public School;
- Joseph Howe Senior Public School.

== Organization ==
=== Board of Trustees ===
The Board of Trustees governs the DDSB. They are responsible for setting the strategic direction and policies that guide action, providing public oversight to the functions of the Board, and approving the annual budget.

The chair and vice-chair of the board and committees are elected annually by the board of trustees at its organizational meeting. The current chair of the board is Christine Thatcher, and its vice-chair is Deb Oldfield.

==== Trustees ====
Trustees are elected to a four-year term to represent the best interests of the community. The DDSB has eleven elected trustees and one appointed First Nations trustee.

Municipality	Trustees
Pickering	Emma Cunningham, Stephen Linton
Ajax	Donna Edwards, Kelly Miller
Whitby	Michelle Arseneault, Tracy Brown, Christine Thatcher
Oshawa	Deb Oldfield, Shailene Panylo, Mark Jacula
Uxbridge-Scugog-Brock	Carolyn Morton
First Nations	Chad Cowie

==== Student Trustees ====
Three student trustees are elected to the Board of Trustees from Pickering-Ajax, Whitby-Oshawa, and Uxbridge-Scugog-Brock to represent students. They can participate in discussion, suggest motions, and have a non-binding vote. They also lead the Student Senate, which is made up of students from across the Board.

==== Committees ====
The Board of Trustees has three standing committees: the Education Finance Committee, Governance and Policy Committee, and Director's Performance Review Committee.

=== Administrative Council ===
The Administrative Council is responsible for administering policies passed by the board of trustees and the day-to-day operations of the board. The Administrative Council is led by the Director of Education, currently Camille Williams-Taylor. It is also composed of superintendents, who lead departments and support local schools.

== Gifted Program ==
The DDSB operates a gifted program for students in grades 4–12. Students can enter a self-contained class with other gifted students at select schools or remain at their home school with teacher accommodations. Learning in the program is curated to be more relevant to each student, and material is taught at an accelerated rate. Acceptance into the gifted program is based on being identified in the top 2% of students.

== Schools ==
The DDSB has 141 schools and learning centres. They are composed of 118 elementary schools, 19 secondary schools, and the 4 learning centres. The learning centres are: Grove School, Durham Alternative Secondary School, Durham Continuing Education and Elementary@home

Municipality	Elementary School	Secondary School
Pickering	Altona Forest PS; Bayview Heights PS; Biidassige Mandamin PS; Claremont PS; Elizabeth B. Phin PS; Fairport Beach PS; Frenchman's Bay PS; Gandatsetiagon PS; Glengrove PS; Highbush PS; Josiah Henson PS; Maple Ridge PS; Rosebank Road PS; Valley Farm PS; Valley View PS; Vaughan Willard PS; Westcreek PS; William Dunbar PS	Dunbarton HS; Pine Ridge SS
Ajax	Alexander G. Bell PS; Applecroft PS; Bolton C. Falby PS; Cadarackque PS; Carruthers Creek PS; daVinci PS; Dr. Roberta Bondar PS; Duffin's Bay PS; Eagle Ridge PS; Lakeside PS; Lester B. Pearson PS; Lincoln Alexander PS; Lincoln Avenue PS; Ontario Street PS; Michaelle Jean PS; Nottingham PS; Roland Michener PS; Roméo Dallaire PS; Rosemary Brown PS; Southwood Park PS; Terry Fox PS; Viola Desmond PS; Vimy Ridge PS; Westney Heights PS	Ajax HS; J. Clarke Richardson Col.; Pickering HS
Whitby	Bellwood PS; Blair Ridge PS; Brooklin Village PS; Capt. M. Vandenbos PS; C.E. Broughton PS; Col. J. E. Farewell PS; Chris Hadfield PS; Dr. R. Thornton PS; E. A. Fairman PS; Fallingbrook PS; Glen Dhu PS; Heartwood PS; Jack Miner PS; John Dryden PS; Julie Payette PS; Meadowcrest PS; Ormiston PS; Pierre Elliott Trudeau PS; Pringle Creek PS; Robert Munsch PS; Sir Samuel Steele PS; Sir William Stephenson PS; West Lynde PS; Whitby Meadows PS; Whitby Shores PS; Williamsburg PS; Willows Walk PS; Winchester PS	Anderson CVI; Brooklin HS; Donald A. Wilson SS; Henry Street HS; Sinclair SS
Oshawa	Adelaide McLaughlin PS; Beau Valley PS; Bobby Orr PS; Clara Hughes PS; College Hill PS; Coronation PS; David Bouchard PS; Dr. C.F. Cannon PS; Dr. S.J. Phillips PS; Elsie MacGill PS; Forest View PS; Glen Street PS; Gordon B. Attersley PS; Harmony Heights PS; Hillsdale PS; Jeanne Sauvé PS; Kedron PS; Lakewoods PS; Maamawi iyaawag PS; Mary Street Community School; Norman G. Powers PS; Northern Dancer PS; Pierre Elliott Trudeau PS; Queen Elizabeth PS; Seneca Trail PS; Sherwood PS; Stephen G. Saywell PS; Sunset Heights PS; Village Union PS; Vincent Massey PS; Waaban PS; Walter E. Harris PS; Waverly PS; Woodcrest PS	Eastdale CVI; G.L. Roberts CVI; Maxwell Heights SS; O'Neill CVI; R.S. McLaughlin CVI; Cedar Valley SS
Uxbridge	Goodwood PS; Joseph Gould PS; Quaker Village PS; Scott Central PS; Uxbridge PS	Uxbridge SS
Scugog	Cartwright Central Public School; Greenbank Public School; Prince Albert Public School; R.H. Cornish Public School; S.A. Cawker Public School	Port Perry HS
Brock	Beaver River PS; McCaskill's Mills PS; Sunderland PS	Brock HS

== See also ==
- Durham Catholic District School Board
- Conseil scolaire Viamonde
- Conseil scolaire catholique MonAvenir
- List of school districts in Ontario
- List of secondary schools in Ontario
