= Ramara =

- Township (lower-tier)
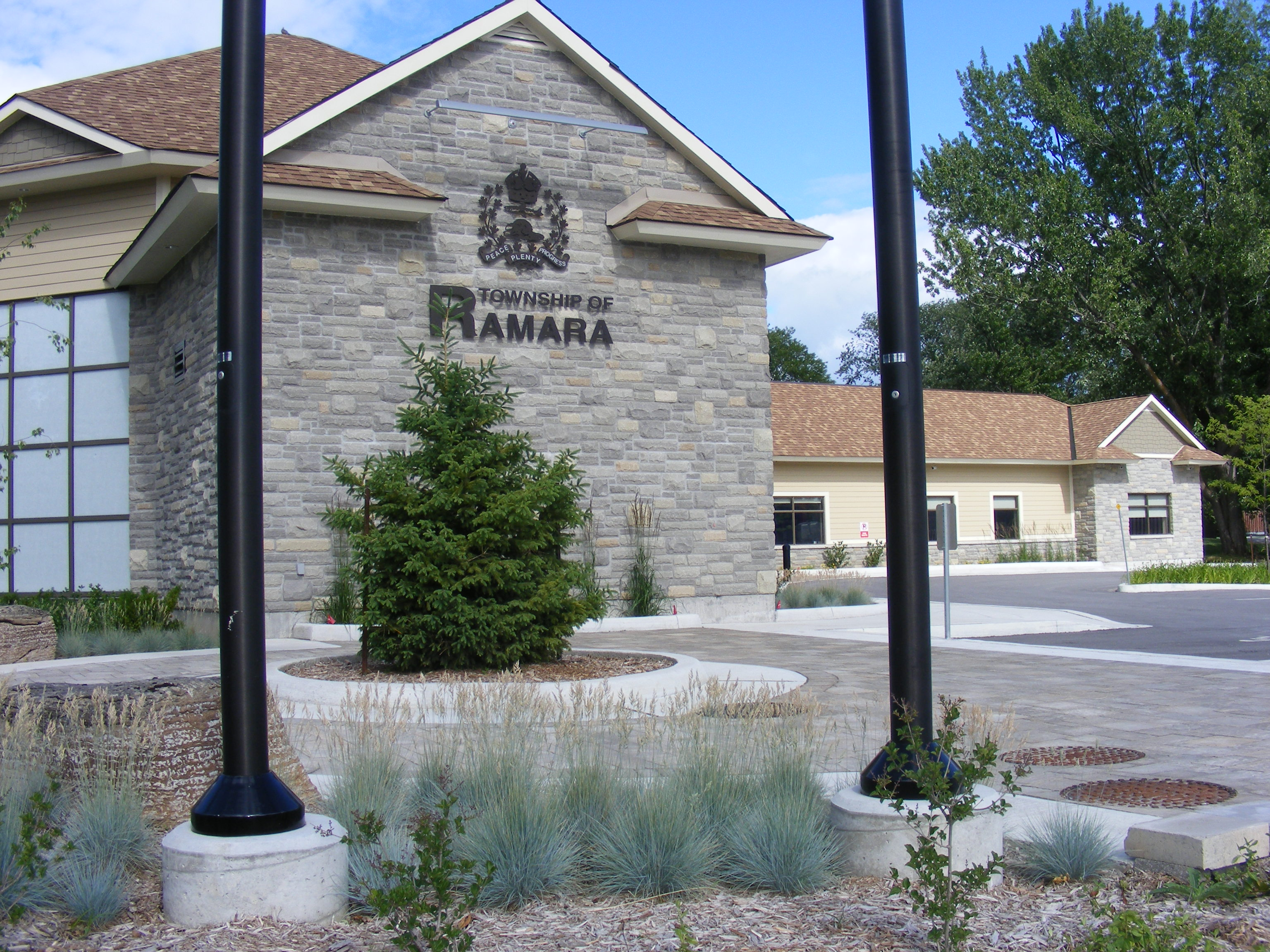
- Municipal office in Brechin

- Location within Simcoe County Location within Southern Ontario
- Coordinates: 44°38′N 79°13′W
- Country: Canada
- Province: Ontario
- County: Simcoe
- Incorporated: January 1, 1994

Government
  - Mayor: Basil Clarke
  - MPs: Adam Chambers
  - MPPs: Jill Dunlop

Area
  - Land: 414.94 km^{2} (160.21 sq mi)

Population (2021)
  - Total: 10,377
  - Density: 25/km^{2} (65/sq mi)
- Time zone: UTC-5 (Eastern (EST))
  - Summer (DST): UTC-4 (EDT)
- Area codes: 705, 249, 683
- Website: www.ramara.ca

Ramara is a lower-tier township municipality in Simcoe County, Ontario, Canada.

Ramara was formed on January 1, 1994, through the amalgamation of the townships of Rama (incorporated on January 1, 1869) and Mara (incorporated on January 1, 1850). Farming, tourism, and aggregate are the primary industries and are supported by a wide variety of local enterprises.

The area is perhaps best known for its proximity to Casino Rama, which is actually located on the neighbouring First Nations reserve of Chippewas of Mnjikaning First Nation in Rama.

== Geography ==
The municipality stretches along the northeastern shore of Lake Simcoe from Gamebridge to Orillia, and along the entire eastern shore of Lake Couchiching from Orillia to Washago.

=== Communities ===
The township comprises the communities of:

- Atherley
- Bayshore Village
- Bayview Beach
- Bonnie Beach
- Brechin
- Brechin Beach
- Brechin Point
- Concord Point
- Cooper's Falls
- Fawkham
- Floral Park
- Fountain Beach
- Gamebridge
- Gamebridge Beach
- Geneva Park
- Glenrest Beach
- Grays Bay
- Hopkins Bay
- Joyland Beach
- Lagoon City
- Lakeview Beach
- Little Falls
- Longford Mills
- Mara Beach
- Mariposa Beach
- McDonald Beach
- Millington (ghost town)
- Murphy Beach
- New Gamebridge Beach
- Oaklawn Beach
- O'Connell
- Orkney Point
- Orkney Beach
- Paradise Point
- Point of Mara Beach
- Prophet Beach
- Ramona
- Rathburn
- Riverside Beach
- Sandy Beach
- Sandy Pine Beach
- Southview Cove
- Talbot
- Tanglewood Beach
- Udney
- Uptergrove
- Val Harbour

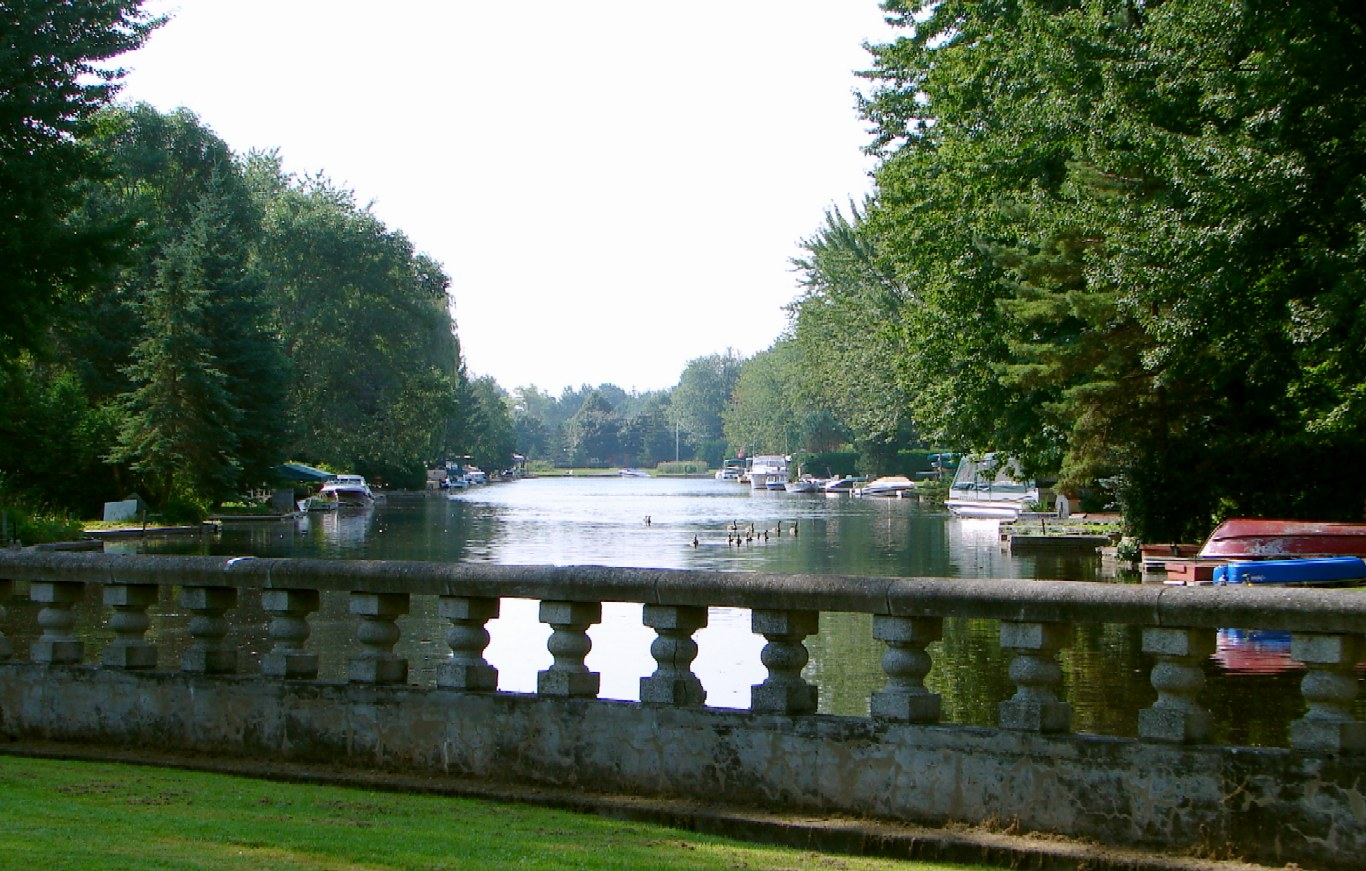
Lagoon City

Brechin is one of the township's largest communities. The town has all the necessities of a small town, such as grocery stores, gas stations, restaurants as well as schools and churches. The town is also a central meeting location for the area's youth where they partake in numerous recreational activity involving the town's proximity to the lake.

The Township of Ramara owns and operates the Ramara Centre, located at 5482 Highway 12, between Atherley and Uptergrove. The Township of Ramara also owns community centres in Longford, Udney and Brechin that are operated by Community Centre Boards of Management which are composed of volunteers.

There are three fire halls in the Township. Fire Hall #1 is located at 3290 County Road 47, Brechin, at the corner of County Rd. 47 and Hwy. 12. Fire Hall #2 is located at 85 Patricia Drive, Atherley, at the corner of Patricia Drive and Balsam Rd. Fire Hall #3 is located at 7305 Simcoe County Rd. 169, Washago, at County Rd. 169 & Switch Rd.

The Ontario Lumberjack Championships were held at the Brechin Ball Park on the second Saturday in June in 2012, 2013, and 2014.

The Canadian rock band Floral Park takes its name from the Floral Park community in which one of the band's members grew up.

=== Goffatt Island ===
Located off Sandy Beach, Goffatt Island is a privately owned 11.10 acres (4.49 ha) island in Lake Simcoe.

=== Climate ===
Climate data for Lagoon City, Ontario (1991−2020 normals, extremes 1995–2020)
Month	Jan	Feb	Mar	Apr	May	Jun	Jul	Aug	Sep	Oct	Nov	Dec	Year
Record high °C (°F)	11.0 (51.8)	11.1 (52.0)	22.4 (72.3)	25.6 (78.1)	30.5 (86.9)	33.5 (92.3)	34.1 (93.4)	33.7 (92.7)	32.7 (90.9)	26.3 (79.3)	18.1 (64.6)	14.1 (57.4)	34.1 (93.4)
Mean daily maximum °C (°F)	−3.8 (25.2)	−2.6 (27.3)	2.2 (36.0)	8.8 (47.8)	16.7 (62.1)	22.0 (71.6)	24.5 (76.1)	23.8 (74.8)	20.2 (68.4)	12.8 (55.0)	5.9 (42.6)	−0.3 (31.5)	10.9 (51.6)
Daily mean °C (°F)	−8.2 (17.2)	−7.5 (18.5)	−2.5 (27.5)	4.7 (40.5)	12.3 (54.1)	17.8 (64.0)	20.4 (68.7)	19.7 (67.5)	15.8 (60.4)	9.2 (48.6)	2.7 (36.9)	−3.6 (25.5)	6.7 (44.1)
Mean daily minimum °C (°F)	−12.6 (9.3)	−12.4 (9.7)	−7.1 (19.2)	0.5 (32.9)	8.0 (46.4)	13.5 (56.3)	16.4 (61.5)	15.6 (60.1)	11.4 (52.5)	5.6 (42.1)	−0.6 (30.9)	−7 (19)	2.6 (36.7)
Record low °C (°F)	−33.8 (−28.8)	−33 (−27)	−29.8 (−21.6)	−16.2 (2.8)	−2.9 (26.8)	4.2 (39.6)	8.4 (47.1)	7.0 (44.6)	−0.7 (30.7)	−4.6 (23.7)	−17 (1)	−31.2 (−24.2)	−33.8 (−28.8)
Average relative humidity (%) (at 15:00)	79.4	75.2	69.2	66.4	66.5	69.7	66.6	66.5	69.1	72.1	77.8	81.8	71.7
Source: Environment and Climate Change Canada

== History ==
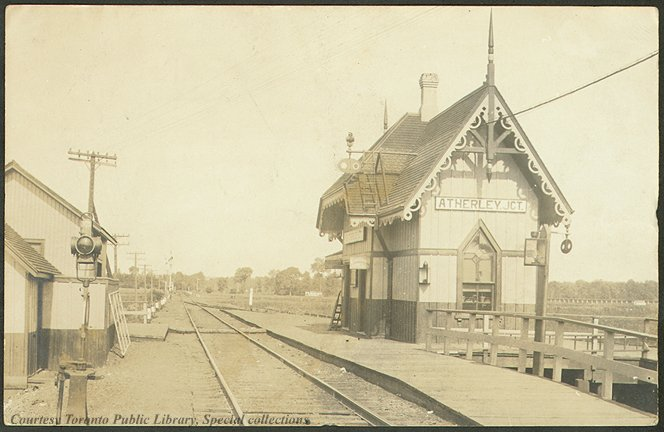
GTR Atherley Junction Railway station in Atherley, 1910

The former townships of Rama and Mara were first named in 1820. The origins of the names are unclear, as both may be either Spanish words (rama for "branch" and mara for "sea") or Biblical references, both meaning "bitter" (rama for Ramah, the biblical town of Benjamin in ancient Israel, and mara for Marah, named in the biblical Book of Exodus as the place where Moses sweetened the bitter waters for the Israelites). As both styles of place naming were popular in Ontario at the time, it is not clear which one is correct.

The townships were originally part of York County but were transferred to Ontario County when they were first incorporated as an amalgamated municipality in 1852. They were later reincorporated as separate municipalities in 1869.

A portion of Rama Township was allocated to form what became the Mnjikaning First Nation 32 Indian reserve of the Chippewas of Mnjikaning First Nation. Many Indigenous people were living on the narrow strip of land that separates lakes Simcoe and Couchiching between Atherley and Orillia. These lands were surrendered by treaty in 1836. Later, the local Indian Agent began purchasing lands in Rama Township and the Indigenous people were resettled there. The main settlement on the reserve is also known as Rama and is the site of Casino Rama.

North of Rama, the community of Longford Mills was established in 1868. In 1867, the American lumberman Henry W. Sage had purchased blocks of land in Rama Township after buying timber berths in Oakley Township in Muskoka District. Sage had considered relocating his mill from Bell Ewart to a point between the Black River and Lake Couchiching or possibly at Wasdell Falls. The area lacked rail transport and so the sawn lumber would have to be barged to the Northern Railway at Bell Ewart. Instead, Sage came up with the idea of a canal to float logs from the Black River to supply the mills of Lake Simcoe. The Rama Timber Transport Company was formed in 1868. That allowed the logs of Muskoka and Victoria to reach the mills of Lake Simcoe, and it also helped to establish the community of Longford Mills.

Ontario County was dissolved upon the formation of the Regional Municipality of Durham in 1974, and both townships were transferred to Simcoe County. As part of the municipal restructuring of Simcoe County, Mara and Rama Townships were reamalgamated to form Ramara in 1994.

== Demographics ==
In the 2021 Census of Population conducted by Statistics Canada, Ramara had a population of 10,377 living in 4,408 of its 6,166 total private dwellings, a change of 9.4% from its 2016 population of 9,488. With a land area of 414.94 km^{2} (160.21 sq mi), it had a population density of 25.0/km^{2} (64.8/sq mi) in 2021.

Historical census populations – Ramara
Year	Pop.	±%
1996	7,812	—
2001	8,615	+10.3%
2006	9,427	+9.4%
2011	9,275	−1.6%
2016	9,488	+2.3%
2021	10,377	+9.4%
Population counts are not adjusted for boundary changes. Source: Statistics Canada

Historical census populations – Mara Township

Year	Pop.	±%
1871	2,697	—
1881	3,237	+20.0%
1891	3,152	−2.6%
1901	2,921	−7.3%
1911	2,871	−1.7%
1921	2,468	−14.0%

Year	Pop.	±%
1931	2,301	−6.8%
1941	2,059	−10.5%
1951	2,143	+4.1%
1956	2,357	+10.0%
1961	2,495	+5.9%
1966	2,651	+6.3%

Year	Pop.	±%
1971	3,071	+15.8%
1976	3,654	+19.0%
1981	3,793	+3.8%
1986	4,249	+12.0%
1991	4,829	+13.7%

Source: Statistics Canada

Historical census populations – Rama Township

Year	Pop.	±%
1871	904	—
1881	1,370	+51.5%
1891	1,752	+27.9%
1901	1,618	−7.6%
1911	1,588	−1.9%
1921	1,229	−22.6%

Year	Pop.	±%
1931	1,027	−16.4%
1941	832	−19.0%
1951	797	−4.2%
1956	818	+2.6%
1961	916	+12.0%
1966	956	+4.4%

Year	Pop.	±%
1971	1,100	+15.1%
1976	1,287	+17.0%
1981	1,422	+10.5%
1986	1,503	+5.7%
1991	1,991	+32.5%

Source: Statistics Canada

== Transportation ==
=== Rail ===
Washago station, located in the neighbouring township of Severn, is served by Via Rail's weekly Canadian transcontinental service between Toronto and Vancouver. The station was also formerly a stop on the Ontario Northland Railway's Northlander service.

The gingerbread style Atherley Junction station was built by the Grand Trunk Railway in what is now Ramara in 1897, but it was destroyed by a fire in 1931. It was likely rebuilt after 1931 by Canadian National Railway, and now the structure is now located at Couchiching Beach Park in Orillia, Ontario.

=== Bus ===
There is bus service from Toronto to Washago operated by Ontario Northland Motor Coach Services. As well, there is extensive charter bus service to Casino Rama.

=== Car ===
Ontario Highway 12 (Trans Canada Highway) is a main connecting road between Ontario Highway 169 and Rama Road (Simcoe County Road 44).

=== Air ===
The closest airport is Lake Simcoe Regional Airport located between Barrie, Ontario and Orillia, and the closest major airport is Toronto Pearson Airport, via Highway 12 and Highway 400.

== See also ==
- List of townships in Ontario
