= Vrooman's Point =

Coordinates: 43.177517°N 79.056888°W

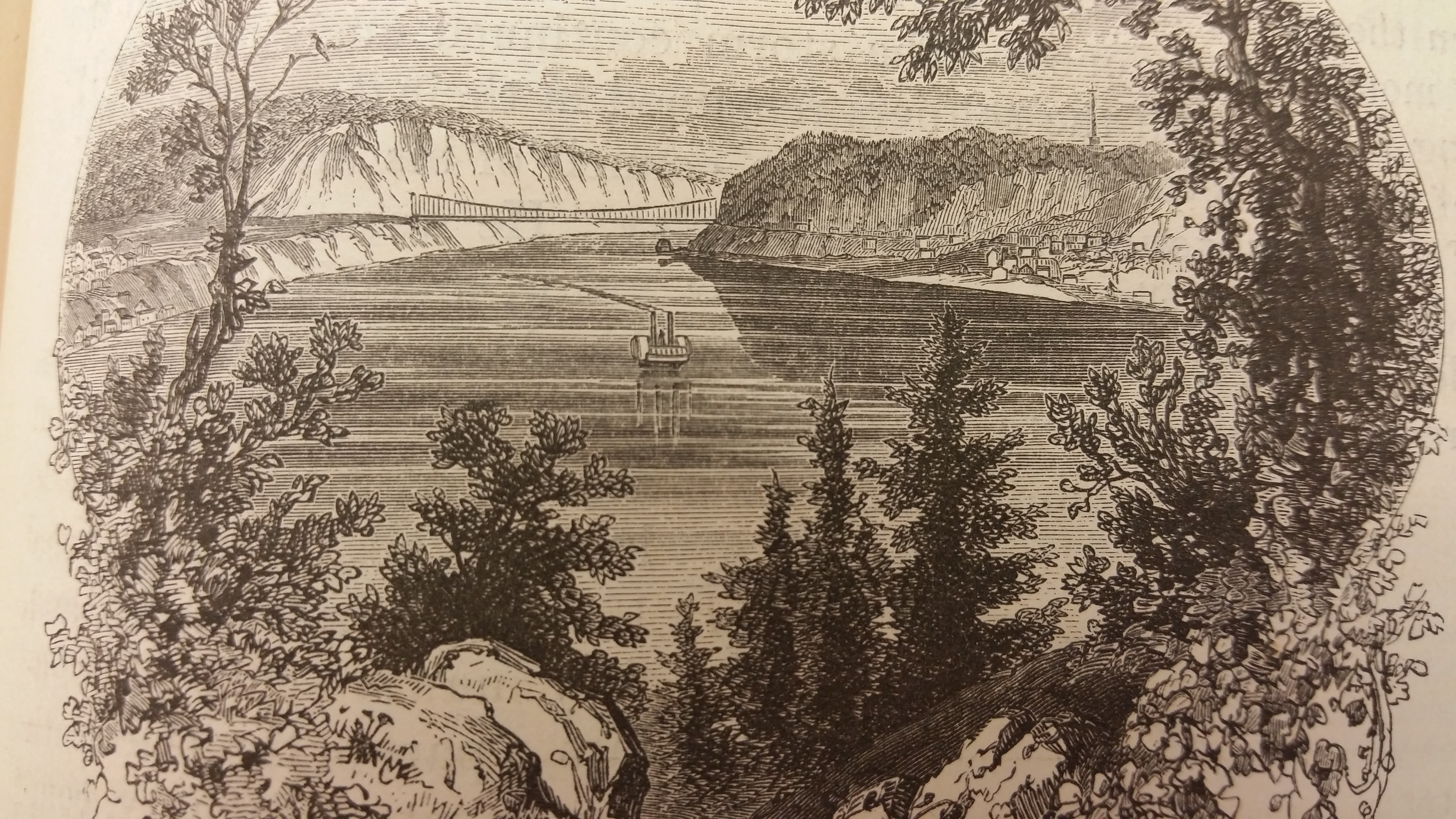
Vrooman's Point

Vrooman's Point is a geographical feature in Ontario, Canada, near the border with the United States. The point projects out into the course of the Niagara River, and is located about a mile north of the town of Queenston, Ontario. The point is also near the city of Lewiston, New York across the river. It was either named after Sergeant Adam Vrooman of the Loyalist Regiment, Butler's Rangers, who originally acquired the property, or after his eldest son, Solomon, who inherited it in 1810 and lived there in 1812.

During the Battle of Queenston Heights in the War of 1812, Vrooman's Point was the location of a vital British twenty-four-pounder artillery piece. Despite being near the limits of its range trying to bombard the battle, the piece harassed American troops on the American shore trying to embark their boats for Canada and the battle, as well as providing support for the British recapture of the heights. The cannon was commanded by Captain Samuel Hatt of the Upper Canadian militia and Lieutenant John Ball.

A monument commemorating the point's role in the battle has been erected. Together with the other monuments to the battle in the area, the point is a popular tourist site.
