= Beaverton, Ontario =

Beaverton
- Unincorporated community
- Osborne Street
- Interactive map of Beaverton
- Coordinates: 44°25′51″N 79°09′10″W
- Country: Canada
- Province: Ontario
- Regional municipality: Durham
- Township: Brock
- Settled: 1822

Area
  - Total: 4.82 km^{2} (1.86 sq mi)

Population (2016)
  - Total: 2,822
  - Density: 585.6/km^{2} (1,517/sq mi)
- Time zone: UTC-5 (EST)
  - Summer (DST): UTC-4 (EDT)
- Forward sortation area: L0K 1A0
- Area code: Area code 705
- NTS Map: 31D6 Beaverton
- GNBC Code: FAGNA

Beaverton is a community in Brock Township in the Regional Municipality of Durham, Ontario, Canada. It is located on the eastern shore of Lake Simcoe at the mouth of the Beaver River.

== History ==
Beaverton was first settled in 1822. It was called Calder's Mills (after an early miller Duncan Miller and Alexander Calder), Mill Town and Milton until it was renamed Beaverton when the post office was opened in 1835.

By 1869, Beaverton was a village with a population of 700 in the Township of Thorah Township in Ontario County. It was the terminus of the Port Hope, Lindsay and Beaverton Railway in 1858. The steamer Emily May plied daily between Beaverton and Bell Ewart station of the Northern Railroad. There were stages daily to Whitby and Oshawa. In 1884, Beaverton separated from the Township and was incorporated as a Village.

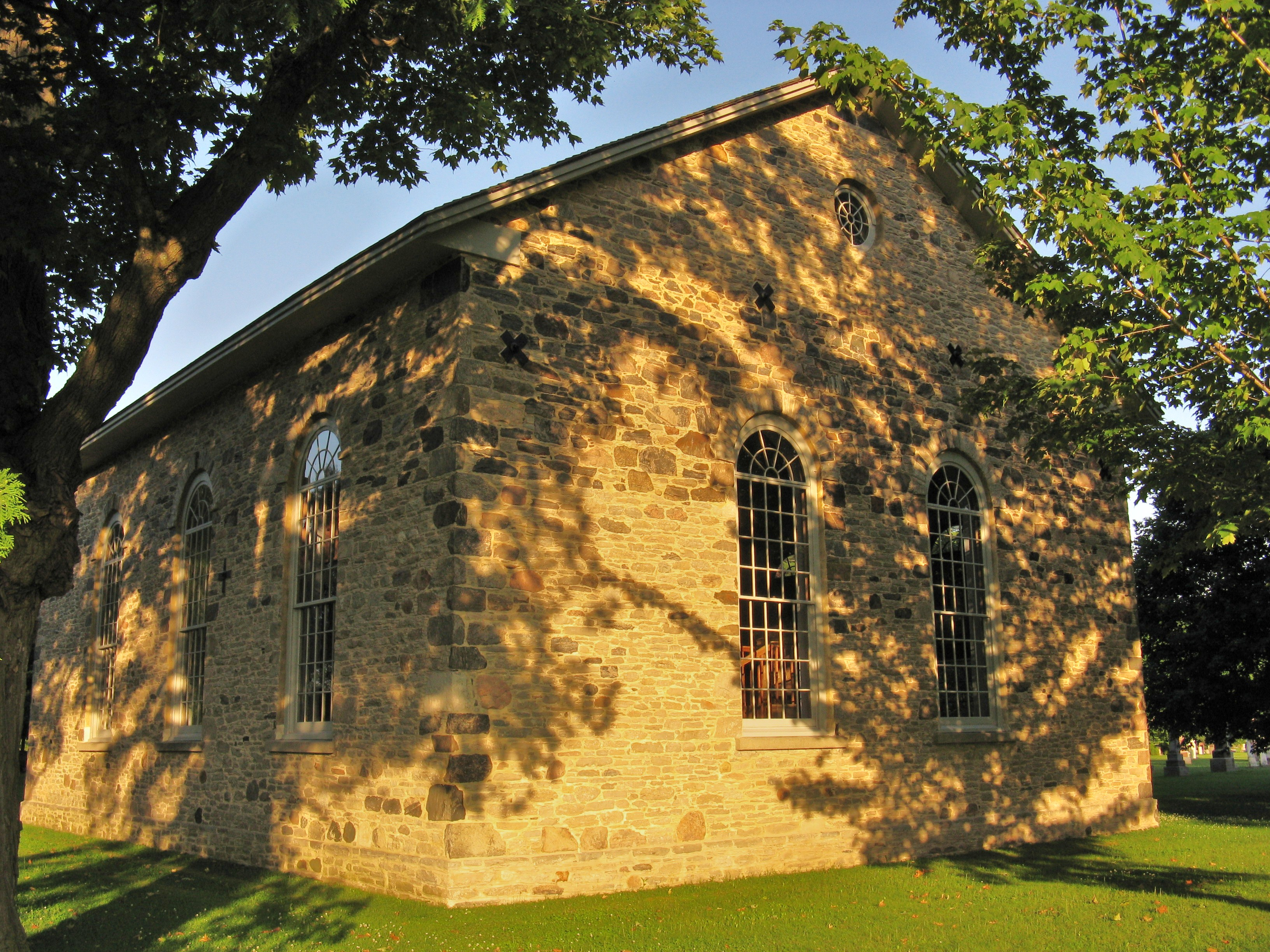
Old Stone Church in Beaverton, Ontario

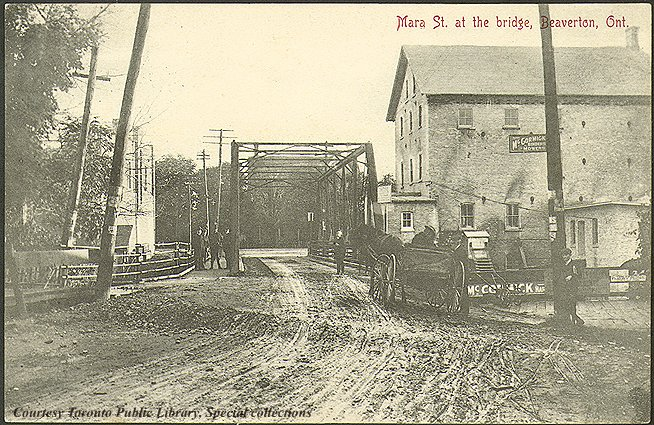
Beaverton, 1910

As part of the creation of Durham Region in 1974, Beaverton was amalgamated with Thorah Township, the original Brock Township and the Villages of Cannington and Sunderland to create the newly expanded Township of Brock.

Today, Beaverton is the largest community in Brock. There are three elementary schools in Beaverton and area, as well as an arena, curling club, public library, small harbour and yacht club. The local economy is based on the provision of services to the surrounding area, supplemented by some manufacturing (car parts manufacturer Flex N Gate See burn). Tourism also plays a role; the Trent-Severn Waterway connects with Lake Simcoe a few kilometres north of Beaverton and the area attracts cottagers from other regions of the Province.

Beaverton's downtown core has many stores, services, and two bars, attracting people from around the local area.

Beaverton is the home of The Strand Theatre. The Old Stone Church, built in 1853 and a National Historic Site of Canada, is also located in Beaverton.

The local post office services the town with lock boxes and rural routes.

== Notable people ==
- Ron Baird – Sculptor.
- Lieutenant William John Gillespie – World War I flying ace.
- Foster Hewitt – NHL broadcaster.
- Tim McCaskell – educator, writer, and activist.
- Basil and Chris McRae – former NHL players.
- John Ritchie MacNicol – Member of Parliament.
- Duncan Macpherson – Editorial cartoonist.
- Richard McMillan – Shakespearean actor.

== In popular culture ==
- The 1973, Canadian horror classic, Cannibal Girls, was filmed in the downtown of Beaverton. Sections of the downtown (The Strand Theatre, King's Bishop Tavern, the library and the bridge) can all be seen. In the movie, the fictitious town that Beaverton filled in for was called Farnhamville.
- The 1984 comedy, Oddballs, was also shot in the area just north along Lake Simcoe, and also at the Trent-Severn Waterway's bridge entry into the lake.
- The Story of Life starring a young girl on a mission to find her lost father was filmed here.
- The movie Jasper, Texas was partially filmed in and around Beaverton, as was the 1987 thriller Dead of Winter.
- In 2012 the Canadian music group The Strumbellas filmed the music video for the song "Sheriff" here.
