= Gamebridge, Ontario =

Unincorporated community in Ontario, Canada

Coordinates: 44.496635°N 79.153267°W

Gamebridge is an unincorporated community in Ontario, Canada. It is recognized as a designated place by Statistics Canada.

== Demographics ==
In the 2021 Census of Population conducted by Statistics Canada, Gamebridge had a population of 119 living in 46 of its 55 total private dwellings, a change of 3.5% from its 2016 population of 115. With a land area of 0.28 km^{2} (0.11 sq mi), it had a population density of 425.0/km^{2} (1,100.7/sq mi) in 2021.

== See also ==
- List of communities in Ontario
- List of designated places in Ontario
