= Cannington, Ontario =

- Cameron Street

- Location in southern Ontario
- Coordinates: 44°20′58″N 79°02′27″W
- Country: Canada
- Province: Ontario
- Regional Municipality: Durham
- Municipality: Brock
- First settled: 1833
- Incorporated (village): 1878
- Amalgamated: 1974
- Time zone: UTC-5 (Eastern Time Zone)
  - Summer (DST): UTC-4 (Eastern Time Zone)
- Postal Code: L0E 1E0

Cannington is a community in Brock Township, Durham Region, Ontario, Canada. The town is on the Beaver River.

== History ==
Originally part of the original Brock Township, Cannington was first settled in 1833. It was first known as McCaskill's Mills after a local mill-owning family. In 1849, a post office was opened, at which point the settlement was renamed Cannington after former British foreign secretary and Prime Minister George Canning (1770–1827). Cannington separated from Brock Township in 1878 when it was incorporated as a Village.

When Durham Region was created in 1974, Cannington was amalgamated with the original Brock Township, Thorah Township and the Village of Beaverton to create the newly expanded Township of Brock. In 1987 there was a fire that destroyed dozens of homes through the town.

== Amenities ==
The community serves as a service centre for the surrounding rural area. It is home to the municipal offices of Brock Township, as well as a secondary school, Brock High School, and an elementary school, McCaskill's Mills Public School, named after the original town name, which was opened in 2006. It was originally two separate schools, H.W. Knight Public School, and Cannington Public School, which later amalgamated. The elementary school offers a French Immersion Program, but not the high school. French Immersion students are bused to Port Perry High School, which offers the program. The post office on Cameron St. W. services locals with lock boxes and two rural routes. There are multiple restaurants such as Mays Restaurant, Pub 12 and The Wing House.

GO Bus route 81 connects the community to Whitby GO Station, which provides GO train connections to Toronto. Two northbound buses (to Beaverton) and two southbound buses (to Whitby) serve the community each day.

== Notable people ==
Cannington was the adopted hometown of guitarist Don Ross for twelve years. Ross' daughter, poet and author Tara McGowan-Ross, also lived there for much of her adolescence.

Cannington was home to the author Timothy Findley, who wrote a memoir, From Stone Orchard, about his experiences living at a farm on the outskirts of Cannington. McCaskill's Mills features as a setting in his 1995 novel "The Piano Man's Daughter". After Findley moved to France due to declining health, dancer Rex Harrington purchased Stone Orchard. Cannington's public library, the Timothy Findley Memorial Branch, is named after him.

Cannington is the birthplace of Rick MacLeish (1950–2016), an NHL hockey player who played with the Philadelphia Flyers in the 1970s and 1980s.

== Events ==
In October, there is the Cannington Haunted Attraction, a collection of Halloween-themed activities in MacLoed Park.
