= List of designated places in Ontario =

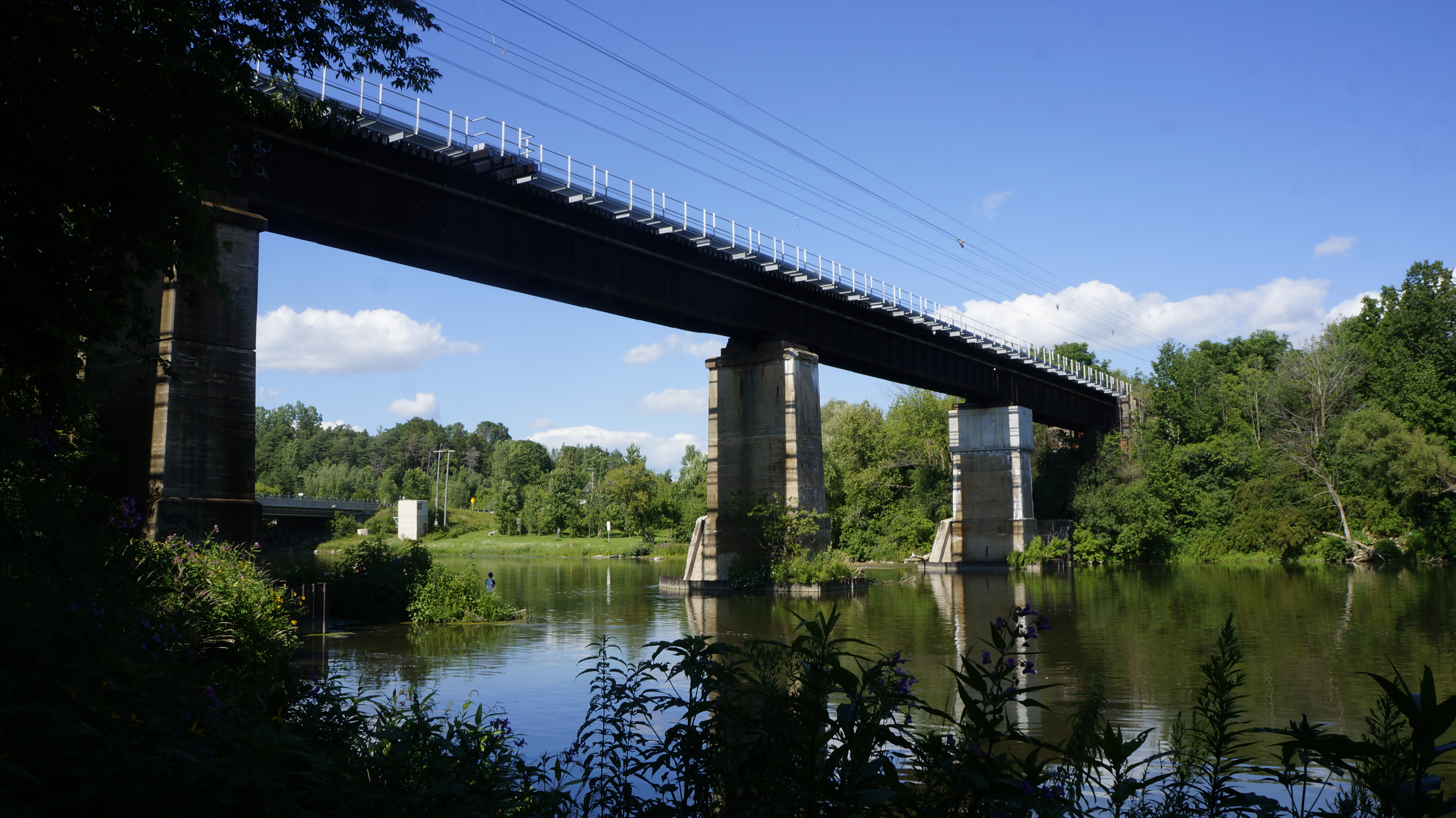
Railway bridge connecting Kitchener to Breslau, Ontario's most populous designated place

A designated place is a type of geographic unit used by Statistics Canada to disseminate census data. It is usually "a small community that does not meet the criteria used to define incorporated municipalities or Statistics Canada population centres (areas with a population of at least 1,000 and no fewer than 400 persons per square kilometre)." Provincial and territorial authorities collaborate with Statistics Canada in the creation of designated places so that data can be published for sub-areas within municipalities. Starting in 2016, Statistics Canada allowed the overlapping of designated places with population centres.

In the 2021 Census of Population, Ontario had 135 designated places, an increase from 129 in 2016. Designated place types in Ontario include 45 dissolved municipalities, 44 local service boards, 37 municipal defined places, and 9 dissolved population centres. In 2021, the 135 designated places had a cumulative population of 74,105 and an average population of 549. Ontario's largest designated place is Breslau with a population of 5,053.

== List ==
List of designated places in Ontario
Name	Type	2021 Census of Population				
Name	Type	Population (2021)	Population (2016)	Change (%)	Land area (km^{2})	Population density (per km^{2})
Alban part A	Local service board	1,051	990	+6.2%	125.71	8.4/km^{2}
Alban part B	Local service board	63	58	+8.6%	51.5	1.2/km^{2}
Arkona	Dissolved municipality	648	634	+2.2%	2.53	256.1/km^{2}
Armstrong	Local service board	146	193	−24.4%	323.85	0.5/km^{2}
Athens	Dissolved municipality	974	982	−0.8%	2.12	459.4/km^{2}
Bayfield	Dissolved municipality	1,250	1,218	+2.6%	2.79	448.0/km^{2}
Beachburg	Dissolved municipality	1,074	1,054	+1.9%	4.29	250.3/km^{2}
Blackstock	Municipal defined place	786	781	+0.6%	0.9	873.3/km^{2}
Bloomfield	Dissolved municipality	477	576	−17.2%	2.05	232.7/km^{2}
Bloomingdale	Municipal defined place	230	230	0.0%	0.59	389.8/km^{2}
Blyth	Dissolved municipality	1,065	989	+7.7%	2.5	426.0/km^{2}
Bothwell	Dissolved municipality	908	856	+6.1%	2.01	451.7/km^{2}
Braeside	Dissolved municipality	203	190	+6.8%	1.85	109.7/km^{2}
Branchton	Municipal defined place	355	375	−5.3%	0.59	601.7/km^{2}
Breslau	Municipal defined place	5,053	3,778	+33.7%	5.44	928.9/km^{2}
Britt part A	Local service board	284	273	+4.0%	34.3	8.3/km^{2}
Britt part B	Local service board	5	20	−75.0%	3.26	1.5/km^{2}
Brussels	Retired population centre	993	1,158	−14.2%	0.87	1,141.4/km^{2}
Cache Bay	Dissolved municipality	658	641	+2.7%	2.85	230.9/km^{2}
Caesarea	Municipal defined place	816	823	−0.9%	0.85	960.0/km^{2}
Campbell part A	Local service board	595	466	+27.7%	158.09	3.8/km^{2}
Campbell part B	Local service board	0	0	NA	0	—
Caramat	Local service board	45	50	−10.0%	35.28	1.3/km^{2}
Cartier	Local service board	218	241	−9.5%	58.41	3.7/km^{2}
Chalk River	Dissolved municipality	1,025	1,000	+2.5%	2.31	443.7/km^{2}
Chatsworth	Dissolved municipality	560	535	+4.7%	0.76	736.8/km^{2}
Claremont	Municipal defined place	1,215	1,202	+1.1%	2.12	573.1/km^{2}
Clifford	Dissolved municipality	875	823	+6.3%	2.67	327.7/km^{2}
Conestogo	Municipal defined place	1,272	1,270	+0.2%	2.16	588.9/km^{2}
Croft part A	Local service board	572	386	+48.2%	148.46	3.9/km^{2}
Croft part B	Local service board	50	50	0.0%	30.45	1.6/km^{2}
Deloro	Dissolved municipality	143	139	+2.9%	1.06	134.9/km^{2}
Epsom	Municipal defined place	181	177	+2.3%	0.48	377.1/km^{2}
Erie Beach	Dissolved municipality	153	150	+2.0%	0.24	637.5/km^{2}
Erieau	Dissolved municipality	363	389	−6.7%	0.69	526.1/km^{2}
Ferguson	Local service board	352	392	−10.2%	46.3	7.6/km^{2}
Finch	Dissolved municipality	541	417	+29.7%	2.07	261.4/km^{2}
Flesherton	Dissolved municipality	590	584	+1.0%	3.64	162.1/km^{2}
Foleyet	Local service board	165	177	−6.8%	11.15	14.8/km^{2}
Foxboro Green	Municipal defined place	398	422	−5.7%	0.58	686.2/km^{2}
Gamebridge	Municipal defined place	119	115	+3.5%	0.28	425.0/km^{2}
Gogama	Local service board	310	325	−4.6%	56.75	5.5/km^{2}
Goodwood	Municipal defined place	689	663	+3.9%	1.43	481.8/km^{2}
Grand River	Municipal defined place	757	778	−2.7%	3.79	199.7/km^{2}
Greenbank	Municipal defined place	584	554	+5.4%	0.78	748.7/km^{2}
Hampton	Municipal defined place	775	755	+2.6%	1.23	630.1/km^{2}
Hawk Junction	Local service board	138	158	−12.7%	83.35	1.7/km^{2}
Hawkesville	Municipal defined place	301	311	−3.2%	0.44	684.1/km^{2}
Heidelberg Wellesley	Municipal defined place	392	387	+1.3%	0.38	1,031.6/km^{2}
Heidelberg Woolwich	Municipal defined place	640	666	−3.9%	0.55	1,163.6/km^{2}
Hepworth	Dissolved municipality	519	506	+2.6%	3.55	146.2/km^{2}
Highgate	Dissolved municipality	299	338	−11.5%	2.88	103.8/km^{2}
Highway 401 Employment Area	Municipal defined place	48	29	+65.5%	3.87	12.4/km^{2}
Hillsburgh	Retired population centre	1,152	1,124	+2.5%	2.94	391.8/km^{2}
Hudson	Local service board	266	270	−1.5%	17.11	15.5/km^{2}
Hurkett	Local service board	94	214	−56.1%	53.08	1.8/km^{2}
Iron Bridge	Dissolved municipality	592	629	−5.9%	31.89	18.6/km^{2}
Jogues	Local service board	214	312	−31.4%	79.15	2.7/km^{2}
Kaministiquia	Local service board	643	625	+2.9%	136.95	4.7/km^{2}
Killaloe	Dissolved municipality	487	594	−18.0%	6.69	72.8/km^{2}
King-Lebel	Local service board	354	379	−6.6%	83.76	4.2/km^{2}
Komoka	Retired population centre	1,882	1,754	+7.3%	1.11	1,695.5/km^{2}
Lanark	Dissolved municipality	803	778	+3.2%	4.77	168.3/km^{2}
Lancaster	Dissolved municipality	729	750	−2.8%	0.72	1,012.5/km^{2}
Lappe	Local service board	1,434	1,436	−0.1%	145.62	9.8/km^{2}
Lee Valley	Local service board	242	491	−50.7%	3.15	76.8/km^{2}
Linwood	Municipal defined place	734	759	−3.3%	0.98	749.0/km^{2}
Lion's Head	Dissolved municipality	624	597	+4.5%	2.01	310.4/km^{2}
Madawaska	Local service board	325	347	−6.3%	262.96	1.2/km^{2}
Madsen	Local service board	153	147	+4.1%	52.74	2.9/km^{2}
Magnetawan	Dissolved municipality	268	259	+3.5%	1.57	170.7/km^{2}
Manchester	Municipal defined place	111	99	+12.1%	0.48	231.3/km^{2}
Manilla	Municipal defined place	102	76	+34.2%	0.27	377.8/km^{2}
Mannheim	Retired population centre	1,002	982	+2.0%	0.99	1,012.1/km^{2}
Maryhill	Municipal defined place	605	576	+5.0%	0.79	765.8/km^{2}
Maxville	Dissolved municipality	748	816	−8.3%	2.03	368.5/km^{2}
McGregor Bay part A	Local service board	201	10	+1,910.0%	38.69	5.2/km^{2}
McGregor Bay part B	Local service board	0	0	NA	12.23	0.0/km^{2}
Minaki	Local service board	197	173	+13.9%	150.23	1.3/km^{2}
Missanabie	Local service board	33	40	−17.5%	0.27	122.2/km^{2}
Moose Factory South	Municipal defined place	495	672	−26.3%	1.51	327.8/km^{2}
Mount Hope	Retired population centre	2,413	2,368	+1.9%	1.44	1,675.7/km^{2}
Nestleton	Municipal defined place	71	74	−4.1%	0.27	263.0/km^{2}
Nestleton Station	Municipal defined place	211	217	−2.8%	0.91	231.9/km^{2}
Nestor Falls part A	Local service board	304	242	+25.6%	427.19	0.7/km^{2}
Nestor Falls part B	Local service board	0	0	NA	47.98	0.0/km^{2}
Nestor Falls part C	Local service board	0	0	NA	71.81	0.0/km^{2}
Neustadt	Dissolved municipality	546	517	+5.6%	2.88	189.6/km^{2}
Newboro	Dissolved municipality	262	251	+4.4%	4.81	54.5/km^{2}
Newburgh	Dissolved municipality	695	729	−4.7%	13.02	53.4/km^{2}
Newtonville	Municipal defined place	629	576	+9.2%	2.26	278.3/km^{2}
Oba	Local service board	5	15	−66.7%	100.92	0.0/km^{2}
Onaping - Levack	Retired population centre	1,941	1,990	−2.5%	8.27	234.7/km^{2}
Pearson	Local service board	343	347	−1.2%	143.24	2.4/km^{2}
Petersburg	Municipal defined place	374	340	+10.0%	0.66	566.7/km^{2}
Plantagenet	Dissolved municipality	1,056	1,027	+2.8%	3.9	270.8/km^{2}
Port Bolster	Municipal defined place	192	135	+42.2%	0.46	417.4/km^{2}
Redditt	Local service board	139	116	+19.8%	70.01	2.0/km^{2}
Restoule	Local service board	502	455	+10.3%	122.01	4.1/km^{2}
Robinson	Local service board	149	110	+35.5%	226.96	0.7/km^{2}
Rodney	Retired population centre	1,004	998	+0.6%	2.08	482.7/km^{2}
Roseville	Municipal defined place	342	338	+1.2%	0.4	855.0/km^{2}
Rosseau	Dissolved municipality	288	223	+29.1%	1.75	164.6/km^{2}
Rossport	Local service board	96	65	+47.7%	1.15	83.5/km^{2}
Savard	Local service board	244	282	−13.5%	201.55	1.2/km^{2}
Seagrave	Municipal defined place	396	458	−13.5%	1.13	350.4/km^{2}
Searchmont	Local service board	445	392	+13.5%	374.74	1.2/km^{2}
Shakespeare	Local service board	160	170	−5.9%	36.53	4.4/km^{2}
Shallow Lake	Dissolved municipality	541	505	+7.1%	1.54	351.3/km^{2}
Sonya	Dissolved municipality	60	50	+20.0%	0.15	400.0/km^{2}
Springfield	Dissolved municipality	761	878	−13.3%	1.92	396.4/km^{2}
St. Agatha	Municipal defined place	450	450	0.0%	0.67	671.6/km^{2}
St. Isidore	Dissolved municipality	892	805	+10.8%	1.17	762.4/km^{2}
Stockyards/Martin Grove	Municipal defined place	246	246	0.0%	1.15	213.9/km^{2}
Sultan	Local service board	45	64	−29.7%	2.76	16.3/km^{2}
Tara	Dissolved municipality	1,119	1,138	−1.7%	2.4	466.3/km^{2}
Teeswater	Retired population centre	1,030	995	+3.5%	2.52	408.7/km^{2}
Terrace Bay	Retired population centre	1,523	1,606	−5.2%	9.42	161.7/km^{2}
Thamesville	Dissolved municipality	774	861	−10.1%	2.22	348.6/km^{2}
Thedford	Dissolved municipality	842	749	+12.4%	2.24	375.9/km^{2}
Thorne	Local service board	172	204	−15.7%	0.69	249.3/km^{2}
Tiverton	Dissolved municipality	717	725	−1.1%	2.26	317.3/km^{2}
Trout Creek	Dissolved municipality	458	538	−14.9%	3.13	146.3/km^{2}
Utica	Municipal defined place	121	113	+7.1%	0.45	268.9/km^{2}
Vienna	Dissolved municipality	736	773	−4.8%	2.71	271.6/km^{2}
Wabigoon	Local service board	419	373	+12.3%	50.53	8.3/km^{2}
Wardsville	Dissolved municipality	420	382	+9.9%	2.21	190.0/km^{2}
Webbwood	Dissolved municipality	440	485	−9.3%	2.82	156.0/km^{2}
West Montrose	Municipal defined place	245	257	−4.7%	0.34	720.6/km^{2}
Wilfrid	Municipal defined place	99	89	+11.2%	0.17	582.4/km^{2}
Willisville & Whitefish Falls	Local service board	321	286	+12.2%	158.61	2.0/km^{2}
Winterbourne	Municipal defined place	343	313	+9.6%	0.51	672.5/km^{2}
Woodville	Dissolved municipality	718	826	−13.1%	2.28	314.9/km^{2}
Zephyr	Municipal defined place	452	505	−10.5%	1.26	358.7/km^{2}
Zurich	Dissolved municipality	941	917	+2.6%	0.85	1,107.1/km^{2}
Total designated places	—	74,105	72,751	+1.9%	4,457.05	16.6/km^{2}
Province of Ontario	—	14,223,942	13,448,494	+5.8%	892,411.76	15.9/km^{2}

== See also ==
- List of census agglomerations in Ontario
- List of population centres in Ontario
