= Heidelberg, Ontario =

Heidelberg is the name of two adjacent designated places in the Canadian province of Ontario:

- Heidelberg Wellesley, Ontario in the Township of Wellesley
- Heidelberg Woolwich, Ontario in the Township of Woolwich
