= Paul Frey =

Canadian heldentenor

Paul Frey (born April 20, 1941) is a Canadian heldentenor, internationally known for his performances in the operas of Richard Wagner. He has performed many times at the Bayreuth Festival and the Metropolitan Opera. He can be heard on CD and seen on DVD.

== Early life and education ==
Paul Frey was born in Heidelberg, Ontario. (Note: There are two adjacent communities with this name—Heidelberg Wellesley, Ontario and Heidelberg Woolwich, Ontario. The sources do not specify which is meant.) He is of Mennonite background. In the early 1960s he sang in a male quartet in his home town and in the Schneider Male Chorus in Kitchener, Ont, whose director Paul Berg encouraged him to take voice lessons. He was a professional hockey player and owned a trucking business. He trained his voice at the University of Toronto Opera School as the first recipient of the Edward Johnson Scholarship.

== Career ==
In 1978 Frey was engaged at the Stadttheater Basel where he sang the lead roles in Werther (his debut), Fidelio, and The Bartered Bride. He was engaged in February 1986 to substitute for Peter Hofmann in the title role of Lohengrin at Mannheim. Wolfgang Wagner heard the acclaimed performance and signed Frey to sing at the Bayreuth Festival, where he debuted in 1987 as Lohengrin (later broadcast by the CBC) and reprised the role in 1988 under conductor Peter Schneider and stage director Werner Herzog. After his Bayreuth debut, he performed at most of the major European opera houses, especially as Wagner's Lohengrin, Parsifal, Erik, and Walther von Stolzing, although he has sung a wide variety of lyric and heldentenor roles, including the title role in Britten's Peter Grimes, Aeneas in Berlioz' Les Troyens, Tamino in The Magic Flute, Titus in La Clemenza di Tito, and Corrado in Verdi's Il Corsaro; he is also renowned as Florestan in Fidelio and Max in Der Freischütz. He made his debut at the Metropolitan Opera in New York in 1987 as Bacchus in Ariadne auf Naxos.

He can be seen on DVD as Walther von Stolzing (from the Australian Opera) and as Lohengrin (from Bayreuth).
