= Heidelberg (disambiguation) =

Heidelberg is a city of 150,000 in southwestern Germany.

Heidelberg may also refer to:

== Places ==
Europe

- Heidelberg, Taurida Governorate, Ukraine (now Novohorivka, Tokmak)

Oceania

- Heidelberg, Victoria, Australia
  - Heidelberg railway station
- Heidelberg, New Zealand, a suburb of Invercargill

Africa

- Heidelberg, Gauteng, South Africa
- Heidelberg, Western Cape, South Africa

North America

- Heidelberg Wellesley, Ontario, Canada
- Heidelberg Woolwich, Ontario, Canada
- Heidelberg, Kentucky, USA
- Heidelberg, Minnesota, USA
- Heidelberg, Mississippi, USA
- Heidelberg, Pennsylvania, USA
- Heidelberg Township, Berks County, Pennsylvania, USA
- Lower Heidelberg Township, Pennsylvania, USA
- North Heidelberg Township, Pennsylvania, USA
- South Heidelberg Township, Pennsylvania, USA
- Heidelberg Township, Lebanon County, Pennsylvania, USA
- Heidelberg Township, Lehigh County, Pennsylvania, USA
- Heidelberg Township, York County, Pennsylvania, USA
- Heidelberg, Texas, USA
- Heidelberg Street, a neighborhood in Detroit, Michigan, USA

== Education ==
- Heidelberg University, Germany
- Heidelberg University (Ohio), United States
- Heidelberg Center for Latin America, European-affiliated university in Chile
- Colegio Heidelberg, Gran Canaria, Spain
- Heidelberg Centre - School of Graphic Communications Management, Toronto, Canada

== Other uses ==
- Heidelberg strain of salmonella
- Heidelberg School, the Australian art movement
- Heidelberg Appeal, 1992 scientific manifesto
- Heidelberg Project by Tyree Guyton in Detroit, Michigan
- HeidelbergCement, a cement and building materials company
- Heidelberg, brand name of Heidelberger Druckmaschinen printing presses
- Heidelberg, codename for the third release of Fedora Core, a Linux distribution
- Heidelberg Catechism
- Heidelberg Tun
- Heidelberg Disputation
- Heidelberg Tavern massacre, Cape Town, South Africa
- Heidelberg (electoral district)
- Heidelberger Druckmaschinen AG, German mechanical engineering company

== See also ==
- Homo heidelbergensis
