= Pearson, Ontario =

Coordinates: 48.192566°N 89.625396°W

Pearson is an unincorporated community in Ontario, Canada. It is recognized as a designated place by Statistics Canada.

== Demographics ==
In the 2021 Census of Population conducted by Statistics Canada, Pearson had a population of 343 living in 140 of its 157 total private dwellings, a change of -1.2% from its 2016 population of 347. With a land area of 143.24 km^{2} (55.31 sq mi), it had a population density of 2.4/km^{2} (6.2/sq mi) in 2021.

== See also ==
- List of communities in Ontario
- List of designated places in Ontario
