= Croft, Ontario =

Unincorporated community in Ontario, Canada

Coordinates: 45.667151°N 79.732681°W

Croft is an unincorporated community in Ontario, Canada. It is recognized as a designated place by Statistics Canada.

== Demographics ==
In the 2021 Census of Population conducted by Statistics Canada, Croft had a population of 622 living in 309 of its 689 total private dwellings, a change of 42.7% from its 2016 population of 436. With a land area of 178.91 km^{2} (69.08 sq mi), it had a population density of 3.5/km^{2} (9.0/sq mi) in 2021.

Population of Croft
| Name | Population (2021) | Population (2016) | Change | Land area (km^{2}) | Population density |
|---|---|---|---|---|---|
| Croft part A | 572 | 386 | +48.2% | 148.46 | 3.9/km^{2} |
| Croft part B | 50 | 50 | 0.0% | 30.45 | 1.6/km^{2} |
| Total | 622 | 436 | +42.7% | 178.91 | 3.5/km^{2} |

== See also ==
- List of communities in Ontario
- List of designated places in Ontario
