= Heidelberger (surname) =

Heidelberger is a German language habitational surname denoting a person originally living in any one of several settlements named Heidelberg ("heath mountain" or less probably "heathen mountain") and may refer to:

- Charles Heidelberger (1920–1983), American cancer researcher
- Irène Heidelberger-Leonard, German literary critic
- Jörg Heidelberger (1942–2015), German politician
- Michael Heidelberger (1888–1991), American immunologist
