= Zephyr, Ontario =

Unincorporated community in Ontario, Canada

Coordinates: 44.201025°N 79.265136°W

Zephyr is an unincorporated community in Ontario, Canada. It is recognized as a designated place by Statistics Canada.

== Demographics ==
In the 2021 Census of Population conducted by Statistics Canada, Zephyr had a population of 452 living in 170 of its 176 total private dwellings, a change of -10.5% from its 2016 population of 505. With a land area of 1.26 km^{2} (0.49 sq mi), it had a population density of 358.7/km^{2} (929.1/sq mi) in 2021.

== See also ==
- List of communities in Ontario
- List of designated places in Ontario
