= Greenbank, Ontario =

Unincorporated community in Ontario, Canada

Coordinates: 44.152155°N 79.015178°W

Greenbank is an unincorporated community in Ontario, Canada, located within the township of Scugog. It is recognized as a designated place by Statistics Canada.

== Demographics ==
In the 2021 Census of Population conducted by Statistics Canada, Greenbank had a population of 584 living in 203 of its 209 total private dwellings, a change of 5.4% from its 2016 population of 554. With a land area of 0.78 km^{2} (0.30 sq mi), it had a population density of 748.7/km^{2} (1,939.2/sq mi) in 2021.

== Notable people ==
- Anna Beecroft Briggs (1860s-1949), playwright

== See also ==
- List of communities in Ontario
- List of designated places in Ontario
