= McDougall, Ontario =

McDougall
- Township (single-tier)
- Township of McDougall
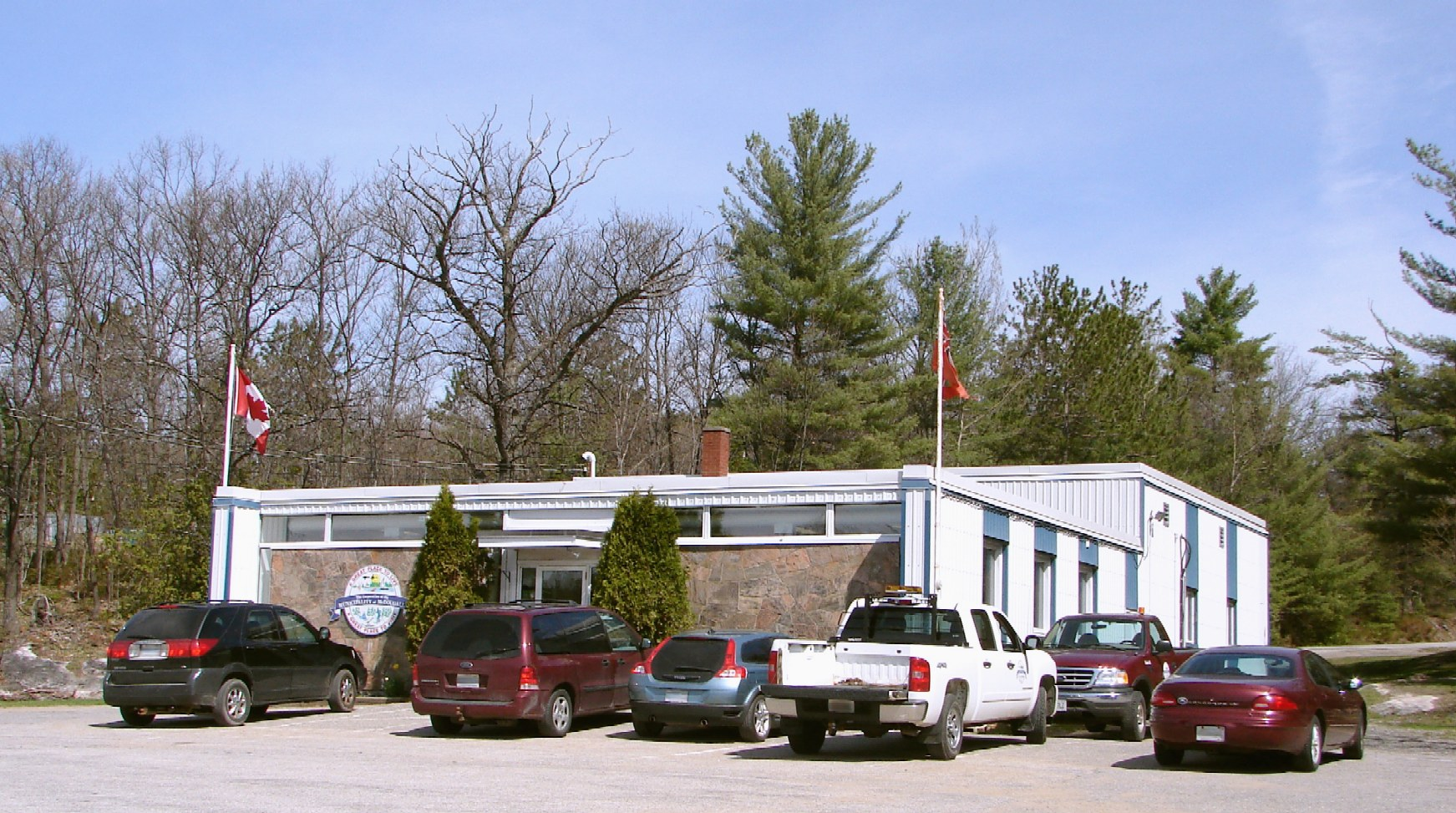
- Municipal office
- Motto(s): A Great Place To Live, A Great Place To Visit
- Location within Southern Ontario
- Coordinates: 45°27′N 80°01′W
- Country: Canada
- Province: Ontario
- District: Parry Sound
- Incorporated: May 1, 1872

Government
  - Type: Township
  - Mayor: Dale Robinson
  - Fed. riding: Parry Sound-Muskoka
  - Prov. riding: Parry Sound—Muskoka

Area
  - Land: 264.02 km^{2} (101.94 sq mi)

Population (2021)
  - Total: 2,744
  - Density: 10.4/km^{2} (27/sq mi)
- Time zone: UTC-5 (EST)
  - Summer (DST): UTC-4 (EDT)
- Area codes: 705, 249
- Website: mcdougall.ca

McDougall is a township in central Ontario, Canada, on the Parry Sound in Parry Sound District. It was named after William McDougall, one of the Fathers of Confederation.

In 2000, the Township of McDougall annexed with the unorganized geographic township of Ferguson, and became the Municipality of McDougall, effective January 1, 2001.

== Communities ==
The township comprises the communities of Badger's Corners, Nobel, and Waubamik.

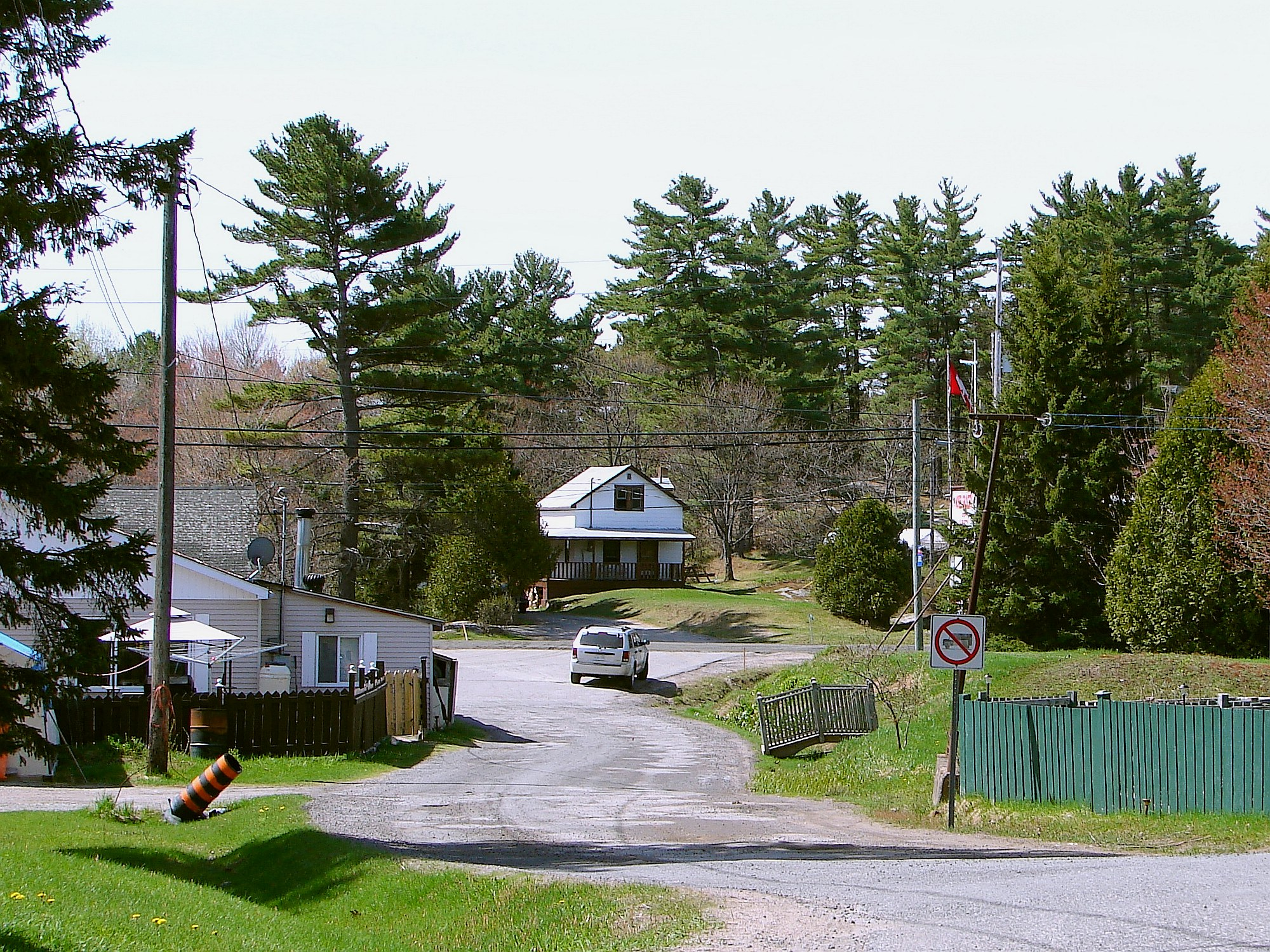
Nobel

== Demographics ==
Canada census – McDougall community profile

	2021	2016	2011
Population	2,744 (+1.6% from 2016)	2,702 (-0.1% from 2011)	2,705 (0% from 2006)
Land area	264.02 km^{2} (101.94 sq mi)	268.48 km^{2} (103.66 sq mi)	268.3 km^{2} (103.6 sq mi)
Population density	10.4/km^{2} (27/sq mi)	10.1/km^{2} (26/sq mi)	10.1/km^{2} (26/sq mi)
Median age	52.0 (M: 51.6, F: 52.4)	50.3 (M: 49.9, F: 50.9)	48.7 (M: 47.6, F: 49.4)
Private dwellings	1,673 (total) 1,154 (occupied)	1,521 (total)	1,664 (total)
Median household income	$92,000	$81,115

References: 2021 2016 2011

Historical census populations – McDougall, Ontario

Year	Pop.	±%
1881	725	—
1891	340	−53.1%
1901	503	+47.9%
1911	620	+23.3%
1921	1,474	+137.7%
1931	1,488	+0.9%
1941	2,191	+47.2%
1951	1,819	−17.0%

Year	Pop.	±%
1956	2,062	+13.4%
1961	2,219	+7.6%
1966	2,058	−7.3%
1971	2,225	+8.1%
1976	2,499	+12.3%
1981	1,687	−32.5%
1986	1,729	+2.5%
1991	2,061	+19.2%

Year	Pop.	±%
1996	2,299	+11.5%
2001	2,608	+13.4%
2006	2,704	+3.7%
2011	2,705	+0.0%
2016	2,702	−0.1%
2021	2,744	+1.6%

Population counts are not adjusted for boundary changes.
Source: Statistics Canada

Mother tongue (2021):

- English as first language: 94.0%
- French as first language: 1.3%
- English and French as first languages: 0.4%
- Other as first language: 4.0%

== See also ==
- List of townships in Ontario
