= Wilfrid, Ontario =

Unincorporated community in Ontario, Canada

Coordinates: 44.320508°N 79.174741°W

Wilfrid is an unincorporated community in Ontario, Canada. It is recognized as a designated place by Statistics Canada.

== Demographics ==
In the 2021 Census of Population conducted by Statistics Canada, Wilfrid had a population of 99 living in 40 of its 44 total private dwellings, a change of 11.2% from its 2016 population of 89. With a land area of 0.17 km^{2} (0.066 sq mi), it had a population density of 582.4/km^{2} (1,508.3/sq mi) in 2021.

== See also ==
- List of communities in Ontario
- List of designated places in Ontario
