= Hwy. 401 Employment Area, Ontario =

Coordinates: 43.331984°N 80.444585°W

Hwy. 401 Employment Area is an unincorporated community in Ontario, Canada. It is recognized as a designated place by Statistics Canada.

== Demographics ==
In the 2021 Census of Population conducted by Statistics Canada, Hwy. 401 Employment Area had a population of 48 living in 21 of its 22 total private dwellings, a change of 65.5% from its 2016 population of 29. With a land area of 3.87 km^{2} (1.49 sq mi), it had a population density of 12.4/km^{2} (32.1/sq mi) in 2021.

== See also ==
- List of communities in Ontario
- List of designated places in Ontario
