= Grand River, Ontario =

Unincorporated community in Ontario, Canada

Coordinates: 43.316962°N 80.314524°W

Grand River is an unincorporated community in Ontario, Canada. It is recognized as a designated place by Statistics Canada.

== Demographics ==
In the 2021 Census of Population conducted by Statistics Canada, Grand River had a population of 757 living in 276 of its 282 total private dwellings, a change of -2.7% from its 2016 population of 778. With a land area of 3.79 km^{2} (1.46 sq mi), it had a population density of 199.7/km^{2} (517.3/sq mi) in 2021.

== See also ==
- List of communities in Ontario
- List of designated places in Ontario
