= Onaping - Levack, Ontario =

Coordinates: 46.632774°N 81.395880°W

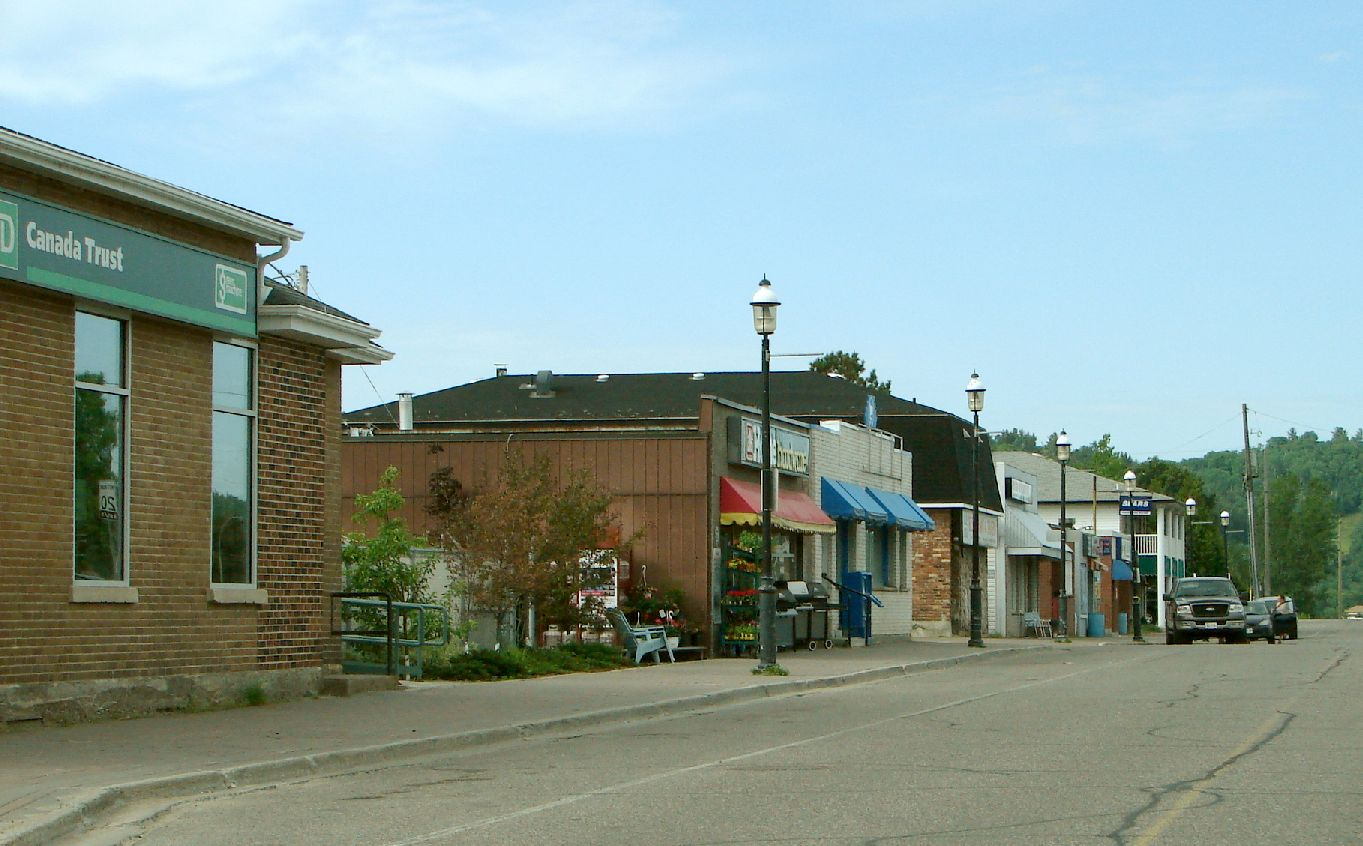
Levack

Onaping - Levack is an unincorporated community in Greater Sudbury, Ontario, Canada. It is recognized as a designated place by Statistics Canada, and consists of the adjacent communities of Onaping and Levack.

== Demographics ==
In the 2021 Census of Population conducted by Statistics Canada, Onaping - Levack had a population of 1,941 living in 874 of its 912 total private dwellings, a change of -2.5% from its 2016 population of 1,990. With a land area of 8.27 km^{2} (3.19 sq mi), it had a population density of 234.7/km^{2} (607.9/sq mi) in 2021.

== Name origin ==
Onaping may be a corruption of the Anishinaabemowin word onamaning. Onaman means red ochre and the locative suffix "ing" transforms the word into "place of the red ochre". Onaping lies on the ridge of the Sudbury basin, an area rich in iron-bearing minerals. Levack was named after Mary Levack Mowatt, the mother of Sir Oliver Mowatt, Ontario premier from 1872 to 1896.

== See also ==
- List of communities in Ontario
- List of designated places in Ontario
