= Alban, Ontario =

Unincorporated community in Ontario, Canada

Coordinates: 46.104703°N 80.626336°W

Alban is an unincorporated community in Ontario, Canada. It is recognized as a designated place by Statistics Canada.

== History ==
The community of Alban was originally established in 1907 as Rutter, named for the nearby railway station in 1907, but in 1937 the community was renamed for Rev. J. Alban Filiatrault.

== Demographics ==
In the 2021 Census of Population conducted by Statistics Canada, Alban had a population of 1,114 living in 533 of its 893 total private dwellings, a change of 6.3% from its 2016 population of 1,048. With a land area of 177.21 km^{2} (68.42 sq mi), it had a population density of 6.3/km^{2} (16.3/sq mi) in 2021.

Population of Alban
Name	Population (2021)	Population (2016)	Change	Land area (km^{2})	Population density
Alban part A	1,051	990	+6.2%	125.71	8.4/km^{2}
Alban part B	63	58	+8.6%	51.5	1.2/km^{2}
Total	1,114	1,048	+6.3%	177.21	6.3/km^{2}

== See also ==
- List of communities in Ontario
- List of designated places in Ontario
