= Stockyards/Martin Grove, Ontario =

Unincorporated community in Ontario, Canada

Coordinates: 43.511730°N 80.546691°W

Stockyards/Martin Grove is an unincorporated community in Ontario, Canada. It is recognized as a designated place by Statistics Canada.

== Demographics ==
In the 2021 Census of Population conducted by Statistics Canada, Stockyards/Martin Grove had a population of 246 living in 139 of its 141 total private dwellings, a change of 0% from its 2016 population of 246. With a land area of 1.15 km^{2} (0.44 sq mi), it had a population density of 213.9/km^{2} (554.0/sq mi) in 2021.

== See also ==
- List of communities in Ontario
- List of designated places in Ontario
