= North Dumfries =

Township in Ontario, Canada

- Township (lower-tier)
- Township of North Dumfries
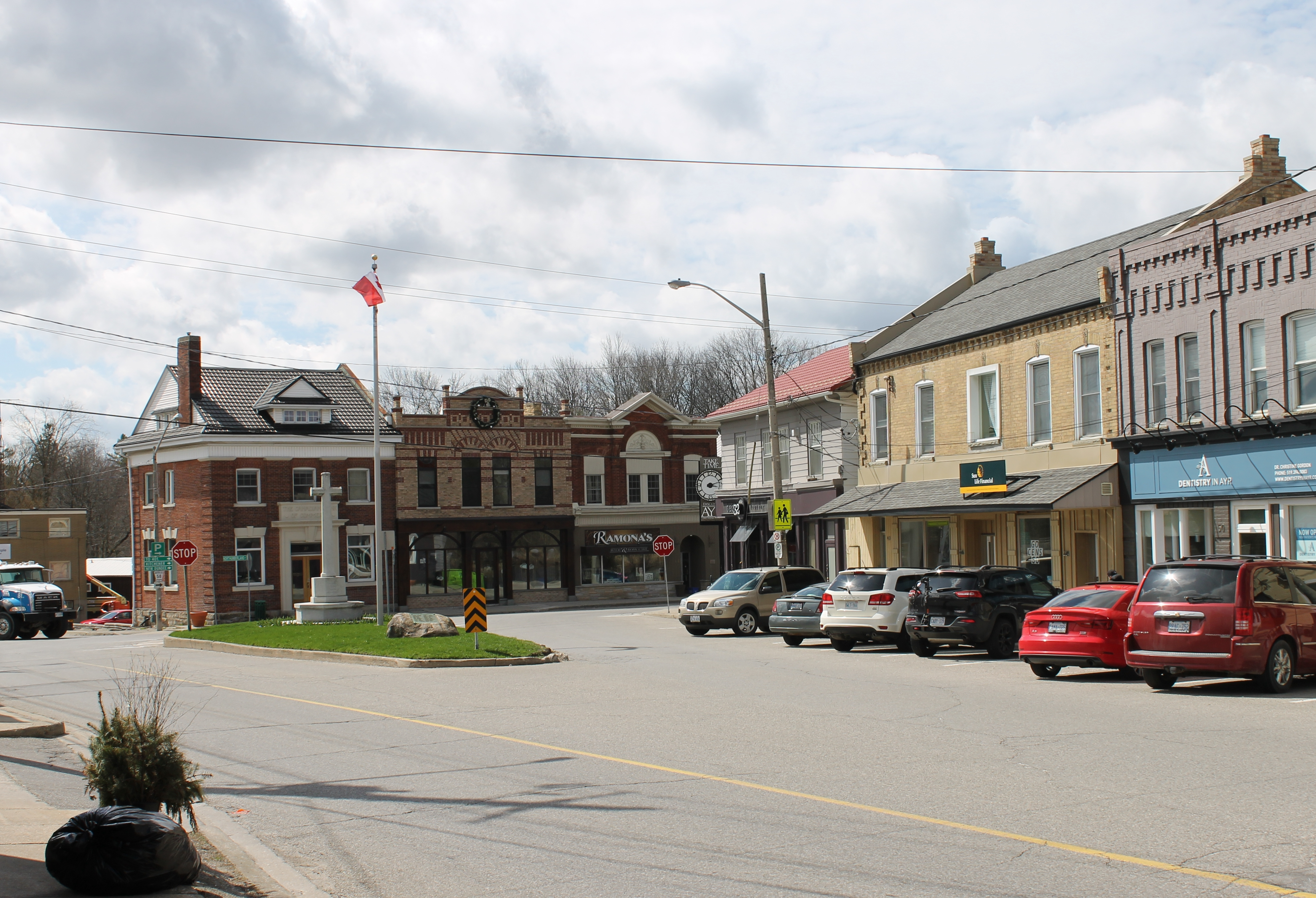
- Downtown Ayr

- Location within Regional Municipality of Waterloo Location within Southern Ontario
- Coordinates: 43°19′N 80°23′W
- Country: Canada
- Province: Ontario
- Region: Waterloo
- Settled: 1816
- Incorporated: 1819

Government
  - Mayor: Susan Foxton
  - Federal riding: Cambridge
  - Prov. riding: Cambridge

Area
  - Land: 187.44 km^{2} (72.37 sq mi)

Population (2016)
  - Total: 10,215
  - Density: 54.5/km^{2} (141/sq mi)
- Time zone: UTC-5 (EST)
  - Summer (DST): UTC-4 (EDT)
- Postal Code: N0B
- Area codes: 519, 226, 548
- Website: www.northdumfries.ca

The Township of North Dumfries is a rural township in Ontario, Canada, part of the Regional Municipality of Waterloo.

== Communities ==
North Dumfries includes the following communities: Ayr, Branchton, Clyde (formerly from Beverley Township, Wentworth County), Reidsville and Roseville. It also contains rural clusters and hamlets such as Brown, Clarkson, Dickie One, Dickie Two, Dumfries, Greenfield, Hall, H’Ayritage, Highway Twenty-Four, Innanen, Lockie, Mackie, McLean, Morrison, Orr's Lake, Parker, Plumtree, Ranchlands, Riverview, Taylor, Wrigley and Young.

== History ==
The history of North Dumfries is closely tied to that of the old City of Galt, now part of the City of Cambridge but which in the early 19th century was part of Gore District. Galt was founded on the east bank of the Grand River by Absalom Shade on behalf of William Dickson of Niagara. Dickson had bought 94,305 acres (381.64 km^{2}) of land in 1816 for 24,000 pounds, and named it after his hometown of Dumfries in Scotland. The Nith River passes through Dumfries in Canada just as the River Nith passes through Dumfries in Scotland. That same year, he had the land surveyed and opened it for settlement. By 1817, a number of sawmills were operating in the district and the population, comprising 38 families, had reached 163. In 1819, the first municipal meeting for the Township of Dumfries North was held.

In 1820, Dickson encouraged further settlement on his land by inviting other Scotsmen to buy land, resulting in a wave of immigration from 1825 until 1832 when every plot of land was filled.

What is now the village of Ayr, then consisting of three small settlements, was first settled in 1822 by Abel Mudge, initially as a squatter. He built a dam, a sawmill and a grist mill at the junction of Smith and Cedar Creek. A post office opened at the settlement called Mudge's Mills in 1840, with the name Ayr, named after a town in Scotland. The other two settlements, Jedburgh to the east and Nithvale to the west, were not yet a part of Ayr but received their mail at the single post office. The population in 1846 was 230 persons, working in businesses such as a grist mill, barrel making, carpentry, wool processing, blacksmithing, tanning hides, making shoes and clothing, or carpentry. The population of Ayr did not reach 1000 until almost 1870. The largest business was a foundry.

In 1847 or 1848, the John Watson Manufacturing Company (later Ayr Machinery Works) had opened and became very successful, shipping iron implements across the country by 1870. By 1854, the village had a small library, two school houses, a fire company, a newspaper and a single (Presbyterian) church.

In 1858, Cruickston Park house was rebuilt by New York architect Detlef Lienau for the American heiress Eliza Astor and her English husband Matthew Wilks, and was later home tot their son Matthew Astor Wilks. The house has been used as a filming location for TV series and for the 2010 film Red.

The village of Ayr, including Jedburgh, was incorporated in 1884 with John Watson as the Reeve. What is now North Dumfries originally formed the north half of Dumfries Township, hence the current name. With the introduction of the county system in the mid-nineteenth century, Dumfries was split between the new Waterloo and Brant Counties. The remaining southern half of the old Dumfries Township is now South Dumfries in Brant County. At about the same time Dumfries Township was divided, the City of Galt was extracted from it as an autonomous municipality within the new Waterloo County. Though the two municipalities (Galt and North Dumfries) were now technically separated from one another, their histories are tightly interwoven as the township nearly envelopes what was then Galt.

The township's easternmost section (around the village of Clyde) was originally part of Beverley Township (now the city of Hamilton); it was transferred to North Dumfries Township in 1973.

== Demographics ==
In the 2021 Census of Population conducted by Statistics Canada, North Dumfries had a population of 10,619 living in 3,689 of its 3,768 total private dwellings, a change of 4% from its 2016 population of 10,215. With a land area of 188.09 km^{2} (72.62 sq mi), it had a population density of 56.5/km^{2} (146.2/sq mi) in 2021.

The ethnic makeup of the township is 97.5% White, 1% Aboriginal and 1.5% visible minorities, of which the largest groups are Black (0.4%), South Asian and Latin American (0.3% each). Around 21.2% of the population is under the age of 14, while those over 65 number 10.3%. The average age is 39.0. There are 3050 private dwellings occupied by usual residents, out of a total of 3103 dwellings. Mother tongues spoken are:

- English as first language: 88.7%
- French as first language: 1.3%
- English and French as first language: 0%
- Other as first language: 10.1%

Population trend:

- Population in 2016: 10,215
- Population in 2011: 9,334 (2006–2011 population change: 3.0%)
- Population in 2006: 9,063
- Population in 2001: 8,769
- Population in 1996: 7,817
- Population in 1991: 6,821

== Local government ==
The citizens of North Dumfries are represented by the mayor and four township councillors. The mayor is directly elected while the councillors are elected in four wards. The mayor serves as the township's sole representative on Regional Council. As of the 2022 election, the elected council members are:

Mayor: Sue Foxton

Councillors:

- Ward 1: Rod Rolleman
- Ward 2: Derrick Ostner
- Ward 3: Alida Wilms
- Ward 4: Scott Tilley

== See also ==
- List of townships in Ontario
- List of municipalities in Ontario
