= Beachburg =

Community in Ontario, Canada

Coordinates: 45.735725°N 76.863109°W

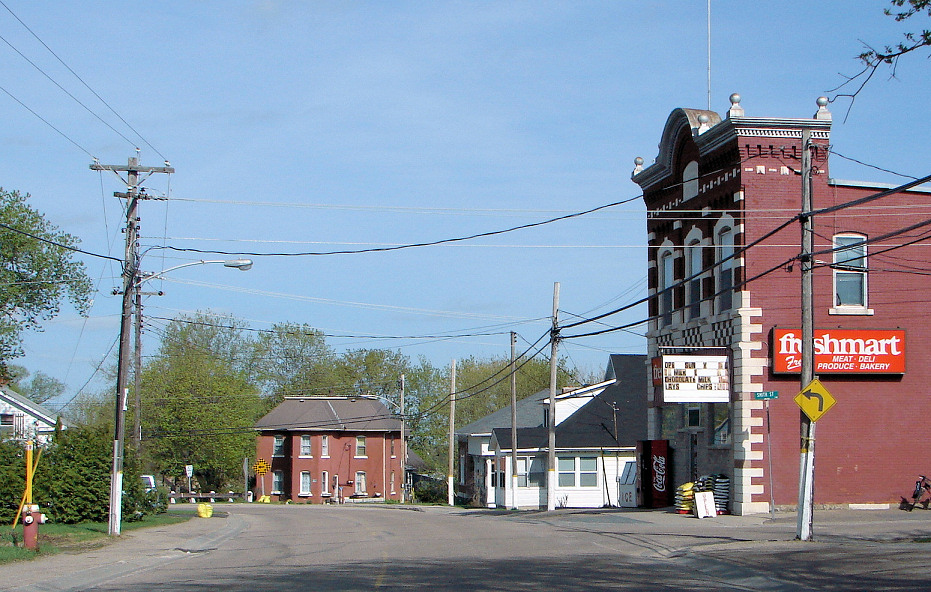
Beachburg Road and Smith Street in Beachburg

Beachburg is an unincorporated community in Renfrew County, Ontario, Canada. It is recognized as a designated place by Statistics Canada.

== History ==
In 1959, the Village of Beachburg was separated from Westmeath Township and incorporated.

== Demographics ==
In the 2021 Census of Population conducted by Statistics Canada, Beachburg had a population of 1,074 living in 430 of its 452 total private dwellings, a change of 1.9% from its 2016 population of 1,054. With a land area of 4.29 km^{2} (1.66 sq mi), it had a population density of 250.3/km^{2} (648.4/sq mi) in 2021.

== See also ==
- List of communities in Ontario
- List of designated places in Ontario
