= Nestleton, Ontario =

Unincorporated community in Ontario, Canada

Coordinates: 44.152593°N 78.798407°W

Nestleton is an unincorporated community in Ontario, Canada. It is recognized as a designated place by Statistics Canada.

== Demographics ==
In the 2021 Census of Population conducted by Statistics Canada, Nestleton had a population of 71 living in 27 of its 27 total private dwellings, a change of -4.1% from its 2016 population of 74. With a land area of 0.27 km^{2} (0.10 sq mi), it had a population density of 263.0/km^{2} (681.1/sq mi) in 2021.

== See also ==
- List of communities in Ontario
- List of designated places in Ontario
