= List of cities on the Great Lakes =

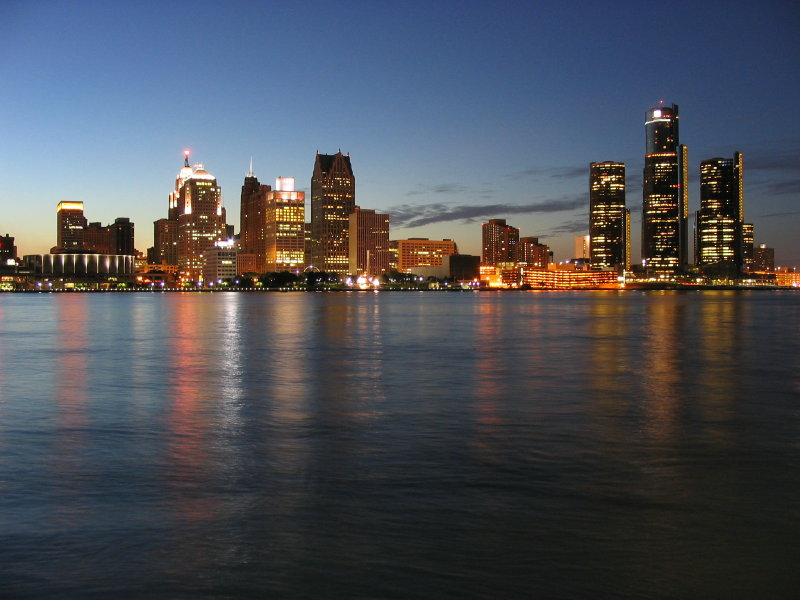
Detroit Skyline at Dusk

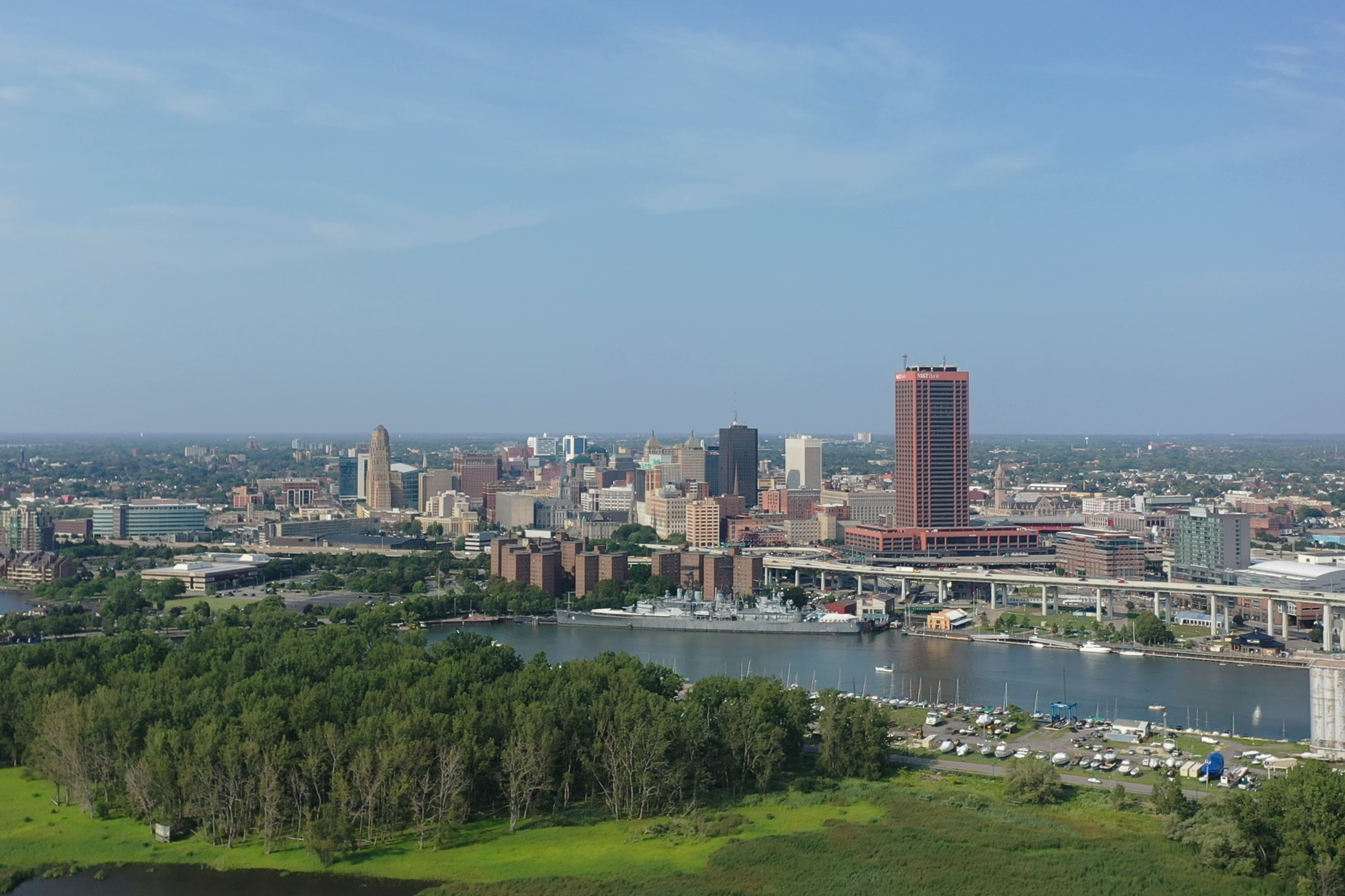
A view of Buffalo, New York, taken from Outer Harbor

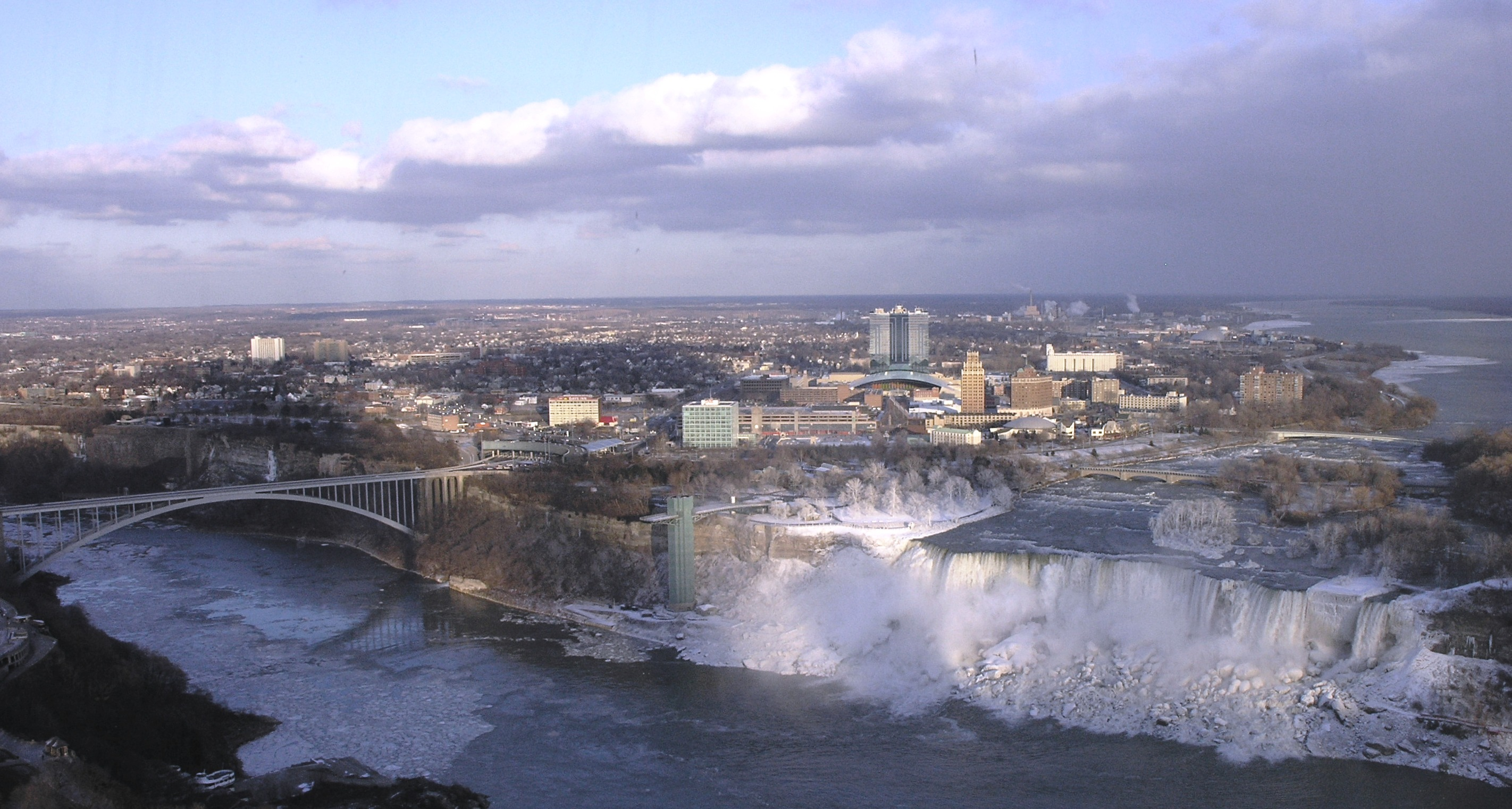
Niagara Falls, New York from Skylon Tower

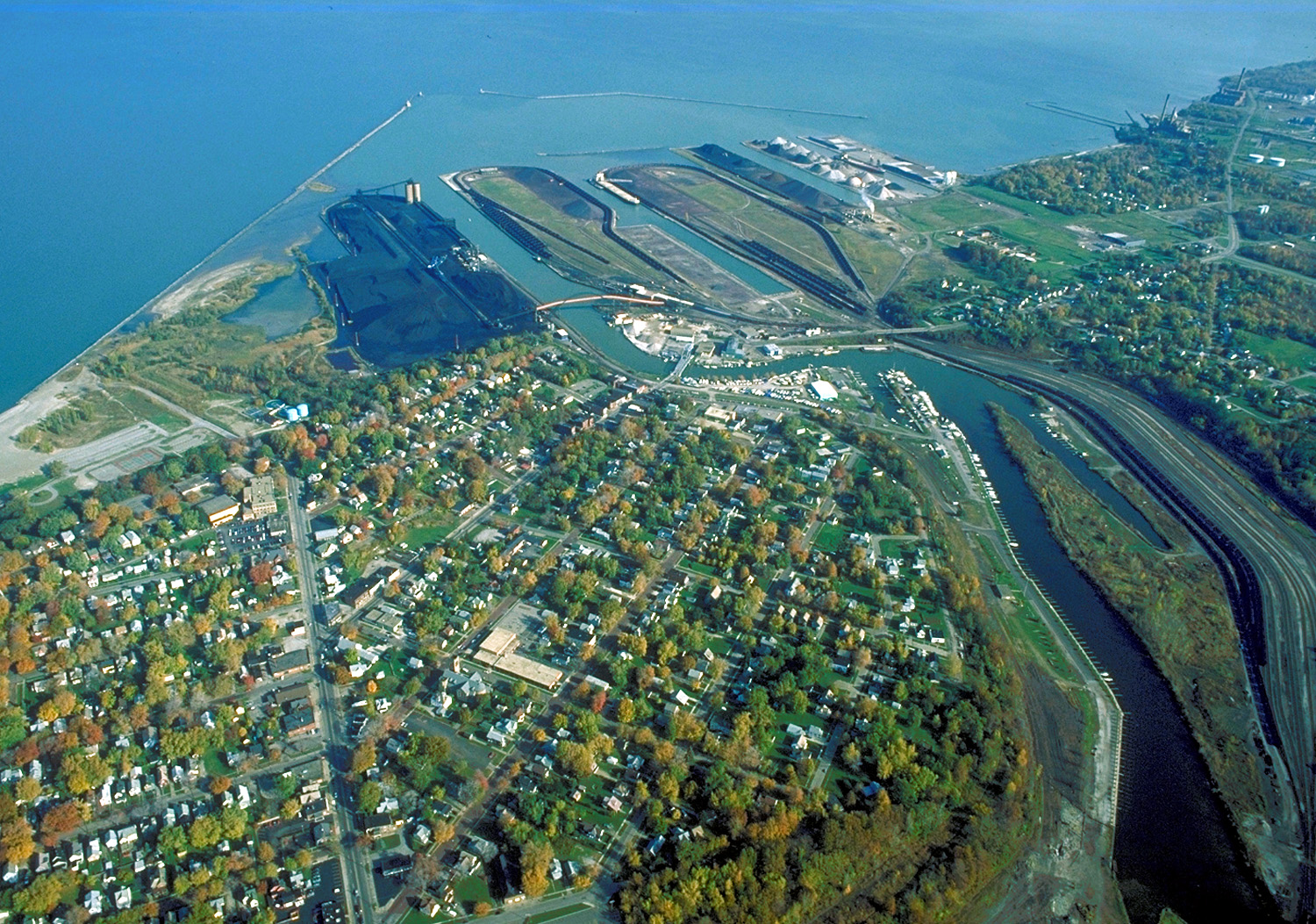
Aerial view of Ashtabula, Ohio

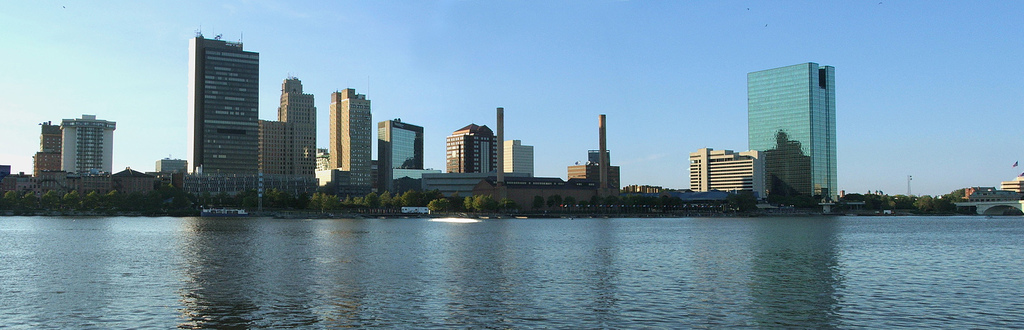
Toledo, Ohio skyline

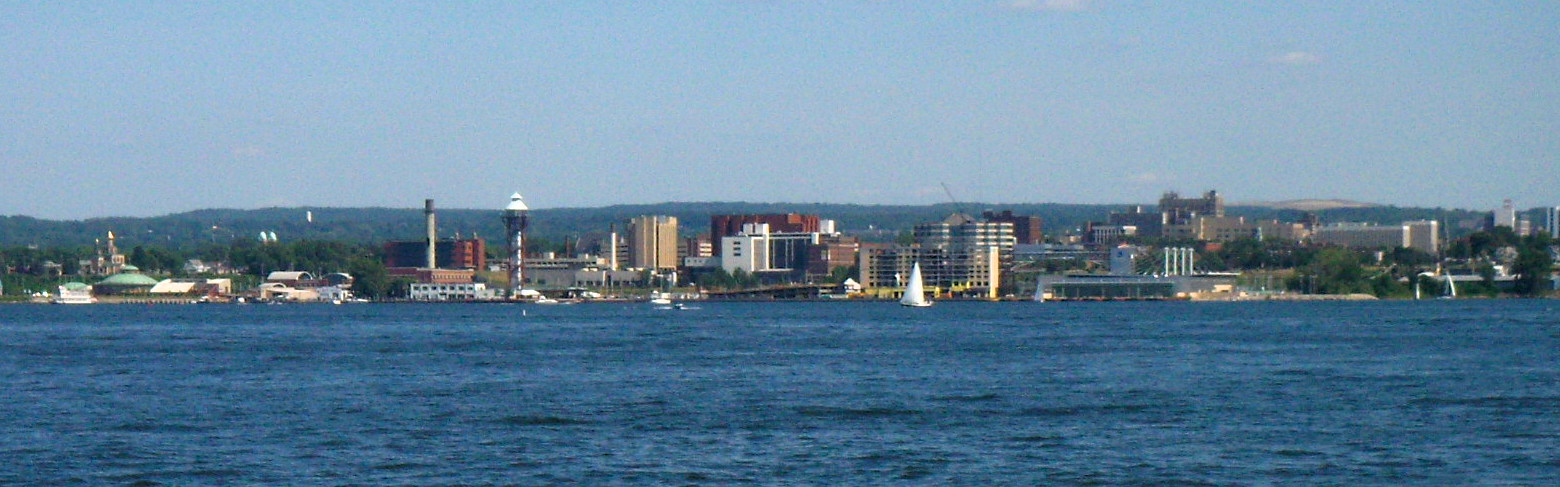
The Erie Skyline on Lake Erie

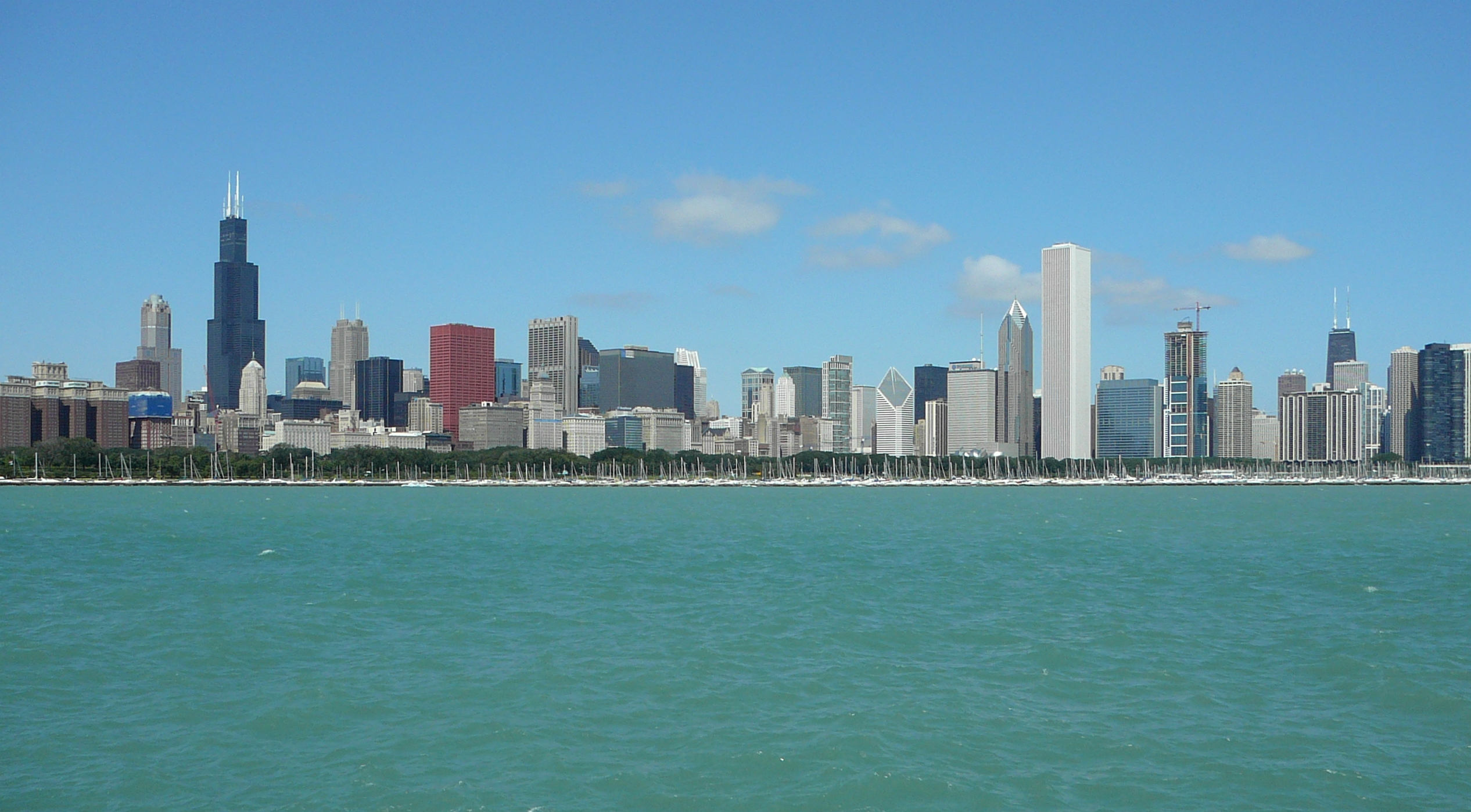
The Chicago Skyline on Lake Michigan

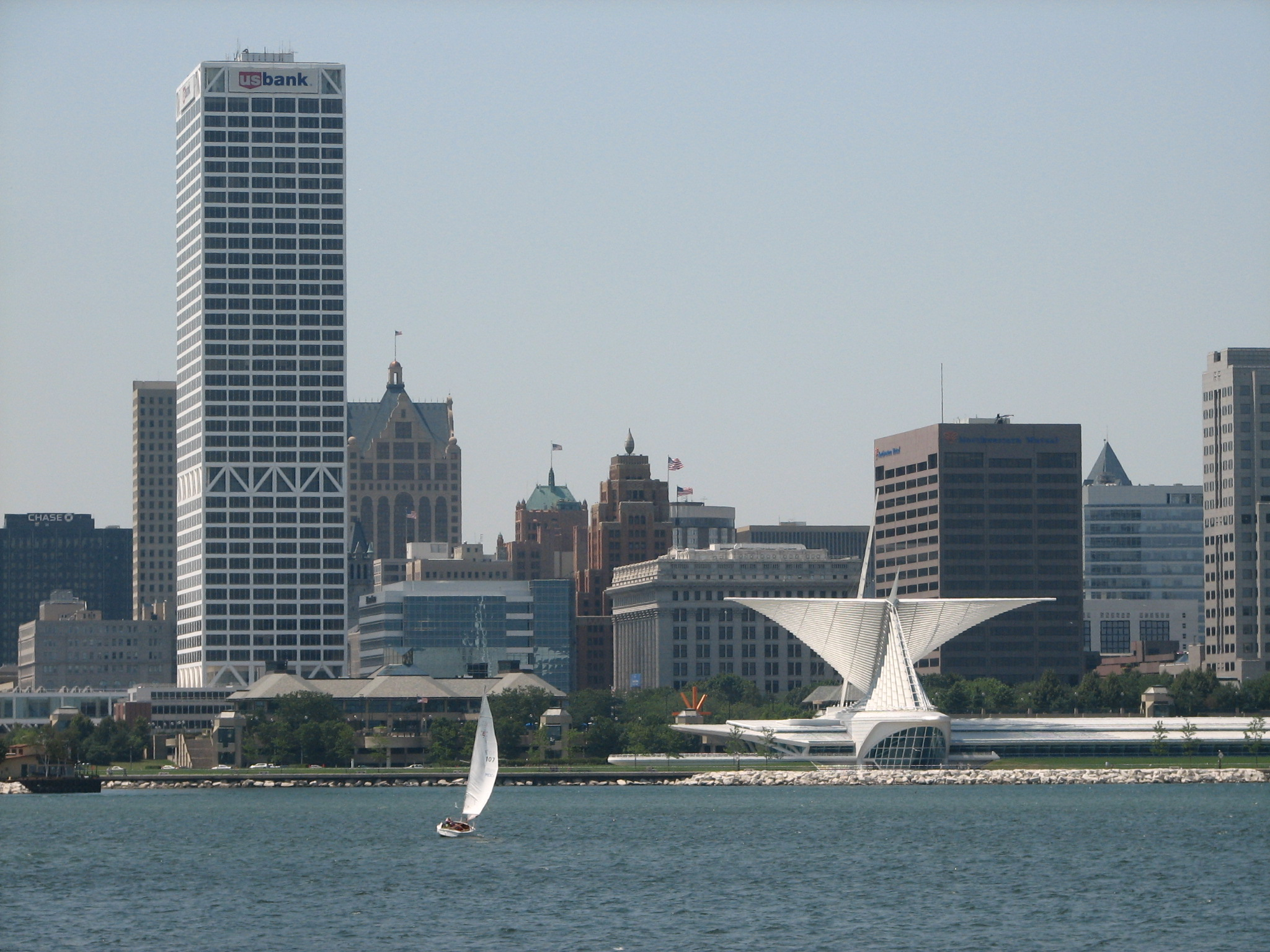
Milwaukee from the harbor

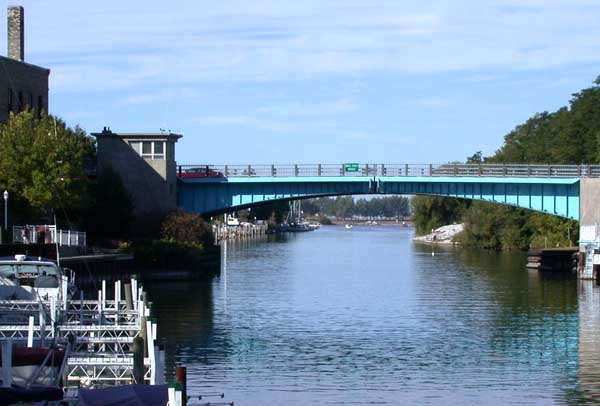
River waterfront in Manistee, Michigan

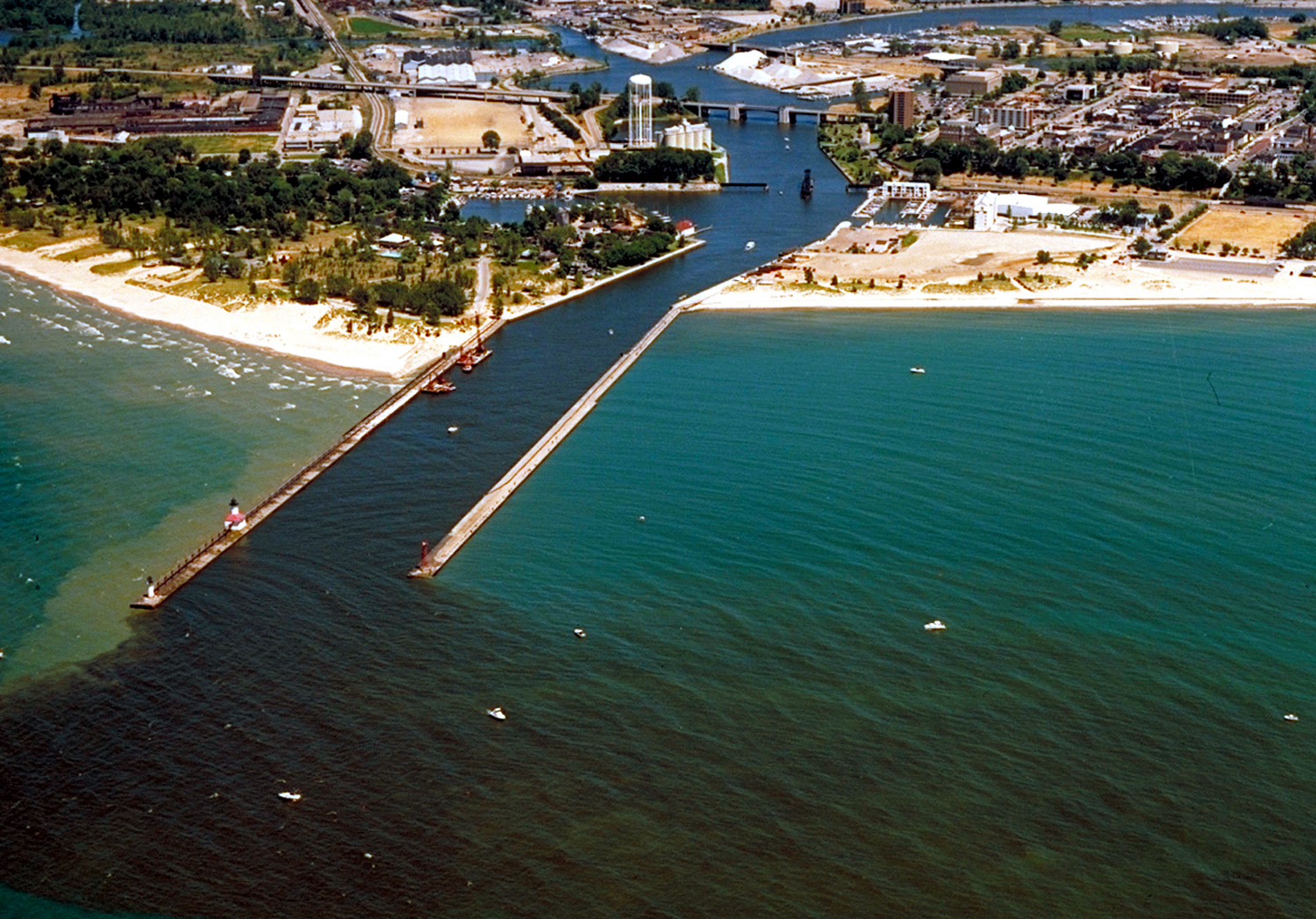
Aerial view of St. Joseph, Michigan

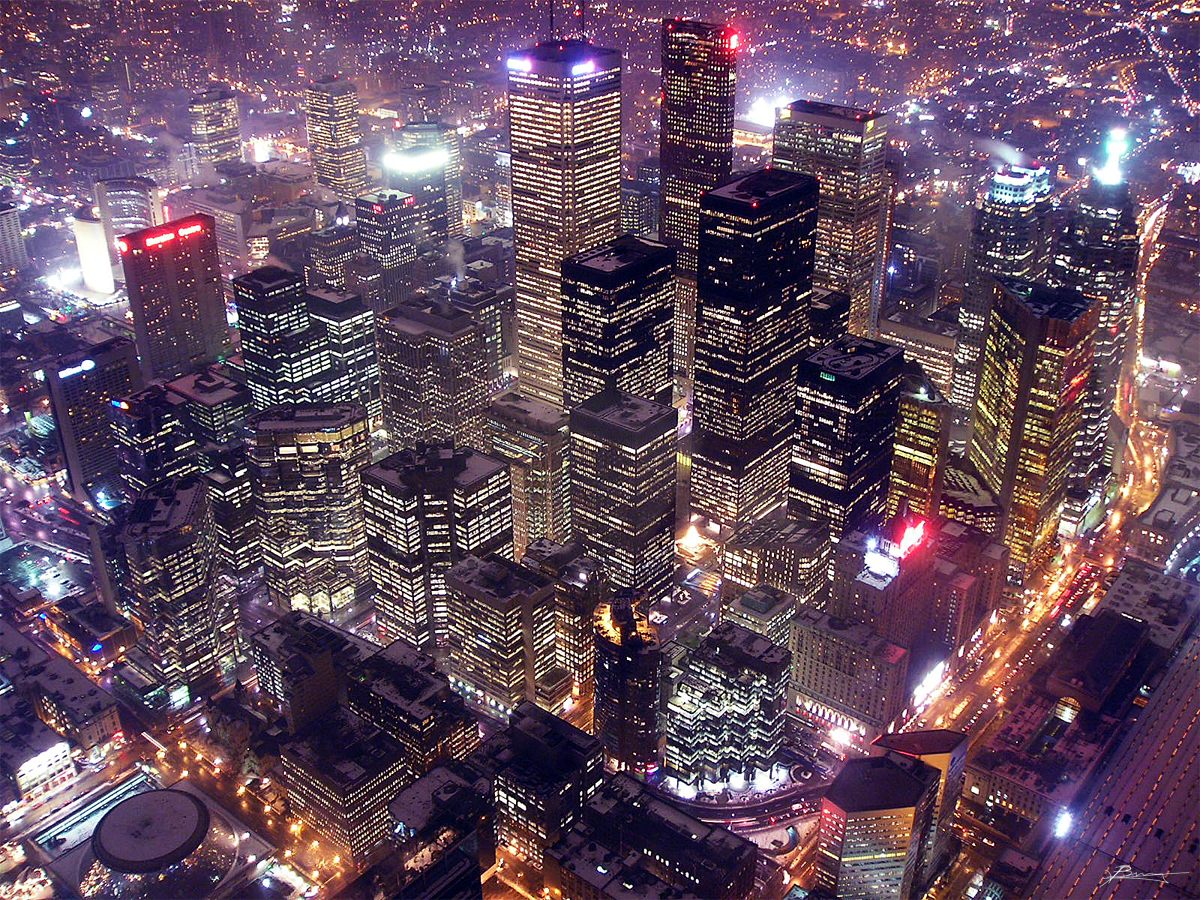
The city's Financial District in Downtown Toronto at night.

This is a list of cities on the Great Lakes of the United States and Canada, arranged by the body of water on which they are located. Cities with more than 100,000 population are in bold, major cities are italicized.

== Lake Superior ==
- **Thunder Bay, Ontario**
- Sault Sainte Marie, Ontario
- Grand Marais, Minnesota
- Silver Bay, Minnesota
- Beaver Bay, Minnesota
- Two Harbors, Minnesota
- Duluth, Minnesota
- Superior, Wisconsin
- Bayfield, Wisconsin
- Washburn, Wisconsin
- Ashland, Wisconsin
- Marquette, Michigan
- Munising, Michigan
- Houghton, Michigan
- Grand Marais, Michigan
- Sault Sainte Marie, Michigan
- Ontonagon, Michigan

== Lake Michigan ==
- Gladstone, Michigan
- Escanaba, Michigan
- Menominee, Michigan
- Marinette, Wisconsin
- Oconto, Wisconsin
- **Green Bay, Wisconsin**
- Sturgeon Bay, Wisconsin
- Algoma, Wisconsin
- Kewaunee, Wisconsin
- Two Rivers, Wisconsin
- Manitowoc, Wisconsin
- Sheboygan, Wisconsin
- Port Washington, Wisconsin
- **Milwaukee, Wisconsin**
- St. Francis, Wisconsin
- Cudahy, Wisconsin
- South Milwaukee, Wisconsin
- Oak Creek, Wisconsin
- Racine, Wisconsin
- Kenosha, Wisconsin
- Waukegan, Illinois
- North Chicago, Illinois
- Lake Forest, Illinois
- Highwood, Illinois
- Highland Park, Illinois
- Evanston, Illinois
- **Chicago, Illinois**
- Hammond, Indiana
- Whiting, Indiana
- East Chicago, Indiana
- Gary, Indiana
- Portage, Indiana
- Michigan City, Indiana
- New Buffalo, Michigan
- Bridgman, Michigan
- St. Joseph, Michigan
- Benton Harbor, Michigan
- South Haven, Michigan
- Douglas, Michigan
- Saugatuck, Michigan
- Holland, Michigan
- Grand Haven, Michigan
- Ferrysburg, Michigan
- Norton Shores, Michigan
- Muskegon, Michigan
- Ludington, Michigan
- Manistee, Michigan
- Frankfort, Michigan
- Traverse City, Michigan
- Charlevoix, Michigan
- Petoskey, Michigan
- Harbor Springs, Michigan

== Lake Huron ==
- Sarnia, Ontario
- Owen Sound, Ontario
- Penetanguishene, Ontario
- Midland, Ontario
- Wasaga Beach, Ontario
- Collingwood, Ontario
- Parry Sound, Ontario
- Sauble Beach, Ontario
- Alpena, Michigan
- Bay City, Michigan
- Cheboygan, Michigan
- East Tawas, Michigan
- Mackinac Island, Michigan
- Mackinaw City, Michigan
- Port Huron, Michigan
- Rogers City, Michigan
- Tawas City, Michigan

== Lake Erie ==
- Kingsville, Ontario
- Leamington, Ontario
- Port Colborne, Ontario
- Monroe, Michigan
- Luna Pier, Michigan
- **Toledo, Ohio**
- Oregon, Ohio
- Port Clinton, Ohio
- Sandusky, Ohio
- Huron, Ohio
- Vermilion, Ohio
- Lorain, Ohio
- Sheffield Lake, Ohio
- Avon Lake, Ohio
- Bay Village, Ohio
- Rocky River, Ohio
- Lakewood, Ohio
- **Cleveland, Ohio**
- Euclid, Ohio
- Willowick, Ohio
- Eastlake, Ohio
- Mentor-on-the-Lake, Ohio
- Mentor, Ohio
- Ashtabula, Ohio
- Conneaut, Ohio
- **Erie, Pennsylvania**
- Dunkirk, New York
- Lackawanna, New York
- **Buffalo, New York**

== Lake Ontario ==
- **Kingston, Ontario**
- Belleville, Ontario (Located on Bay of Quinte)
- **Oshawa, Ontario**
- **Whitby, Ontario**
- **Ajax, Ontario**
- **Pickering, Ontario**
- **Toronto, Ontario**
- **Mississauga, Ontario**
- **Oakville, Ontario**
- **Burlington, Ontario**
- **Hamilton, Ontario**
- **St. Catharines, Ontario**
- **Rochester, New York**
- Oswego, New York

== Cities on rivers or smaller lakes between two Great Lakes ==
- Sault Ste. Marie, Michigan (St. Marys River)
- Sault Ste. Marie, Ontario (St. Marys River)
- Marysville, Michigan (St. Clair River)
- St. Clair, Michigan (St. Clair River)
- Marine City, Michigan (St. Clair River)
- Algonac, Michigan (St. Clair River)
- New Baltimore, Michigan (Lake St. Clair)
- St. Clair Shores, Michigan (Lake St. Clair)
- Grosse Pointe Farms, Michigan (Lake St. Clair)
- Grosse Pointe, Michigan (Lake St. Clair)
- Grosse Pointe Park, Michigan (Lake St. Clair)
- **Detroit, Michigan** (Detroit River)
- **Windsor, Ontario** (Detroit River)
- River Rouge, Michigan (Detroit River)
- Ecorse, Michigan (Detroit River)
- Wyandotte, Michigan (Detroit River)
- Riverview, Michigan (Detroit River)
- Trenton, Michigan (Detroit River)
- Gibraltar, Michigan (Detroit River)
- Niagara Falls, New York (Niagara River)
- Niagara Falls, Ontario (Niagara River)
- Grosse Ile, Michigan (Detroit River)

== See also ==
- List of ports on the Great Lakes
