= Foxboro Green, Ontario =

Coordinates: 43.418250°N 80.697052°W

Foxboro Green is an unincorporated community in Ontario, Canada. It is recognized as a designated place by Statistics Canada.

== Demographics ==
In the 2021 Census of Population conducted by Statistics Canada, Foxboro Green had a population of 398 living in 214 of its 217 total private dwellings, a change of -5.7% from its 2016 population of 422. With a land area of 0.58 km^{2} (0.22 sq mi), it had a population density of 686.2/km^{2} (1,777.3/sq mi) in 2021.

== See also ==
- List of communities in Ontario
- List of designated places in Ontario
