= Campbell, Ontario =

Coordinates: 45.732179°N 83.376273°W

Campbell is an unincorporated community in Ontario, Canada. It is recognized as a designated place by Statistics Canada.

== Demographics ==
In the 2021 Census of Population conducted by Statistics Canada, Campbell had a population of 595 living in 260 of its 462 total private dwellings, a change of 27.7% from its 2016 population of 466. With a land area of 158.09 km^{2} (61.04 sq mi), it had a population density of 3.8/km^{2} (9.7/sq mi) in 2021.

Population of Campbell
Name	Population (2021)	Population (2016)	Change	Land area (km^{2})	Population density
Campbell part A	595	466	+27.7%	158.09	3.8/km^{2}
Campbell part B	0	0	NA	0	NA
Total	595	466	+27.7%	158.09	3.8/km^{2}

== See also ==
- List of communities in Ontario
- List of designated places in Ontario
