= Clyde, Ontario =

- Dispersed Rural Community
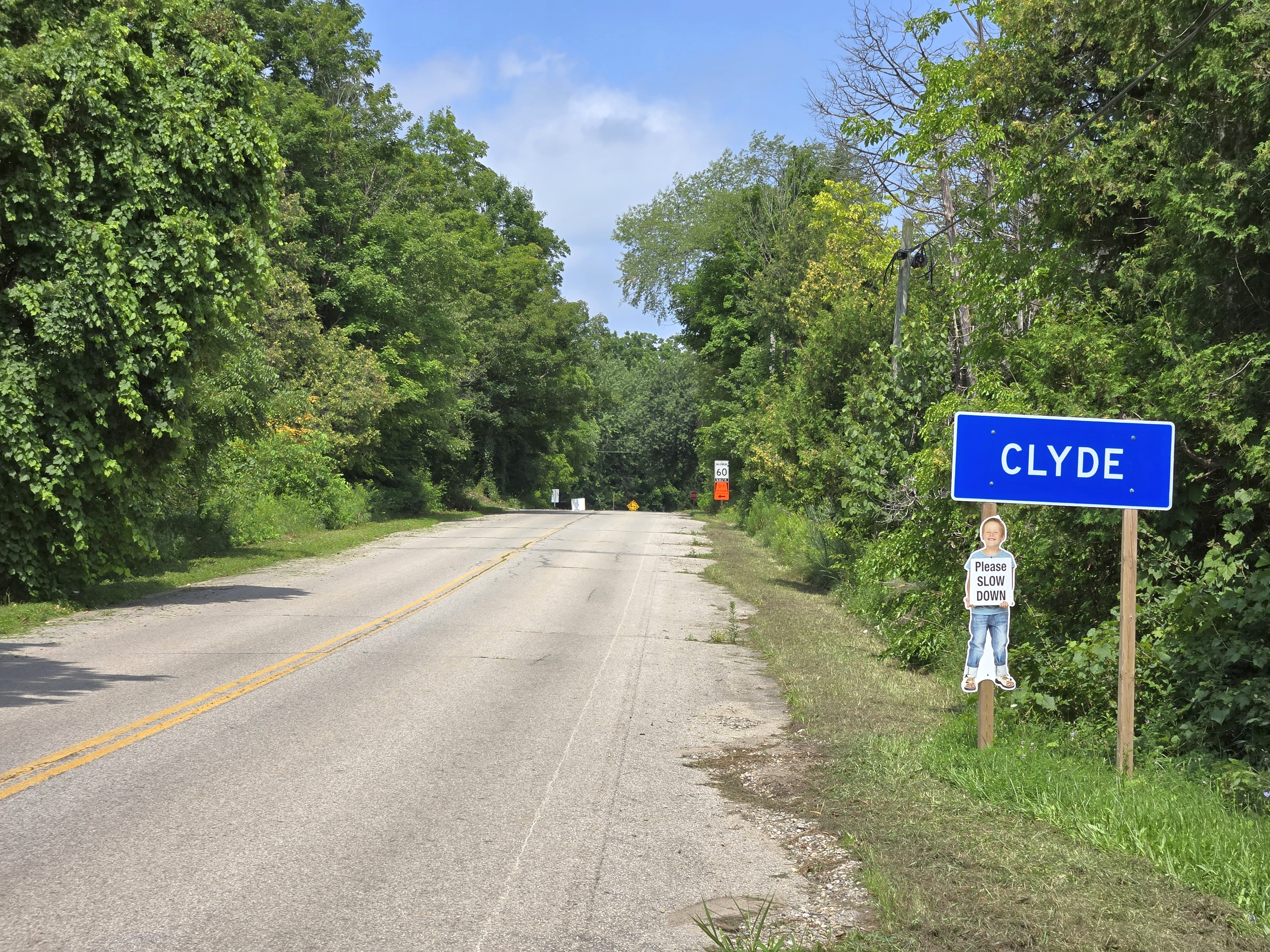
- Village Road in Clyde

- Location within Regional Municipality of Waterloo Location within Southern Ontario
- Coordinates: 43°23′03″N 80°13′42″W
- Province: Ontario
- Regional municipality: Waterloo
- Township: North Dumfries
- Time zone: UTC-5 (Eastern (EST))
  - Summer (DST): UTC-4 (EDT)
- GNBC Code: FARUL

Clyde is a dispersed rural community in North Dumfries, Waterloo Region, Ontario, Canada.

== History ==
Clyde was one of the last settlements established in the former Beverley Township, because it was farthest in distance from the main centre of Dundas.

William Anderson and his wife cleared trees and established a farm here in 1831. Other Scottish immigrants followed, and the settlement was named "Clyde" after the River Clyde in Scotland.

The first school built was a log school. It was replaced by a frame school in 1851. The early settlement had a post office opened in 1857, a blacksmith, hotel, wagon shop, shoe shop, Gospel Hall, and the Clyde Store, destroyed by fire in 1923.

In 1973, a portion of Beverly Township—which included Clyde—was amalgamated into the Township of North Dumfries.
