= Roseville, Ontario =

Roseville
- Unincorporated community
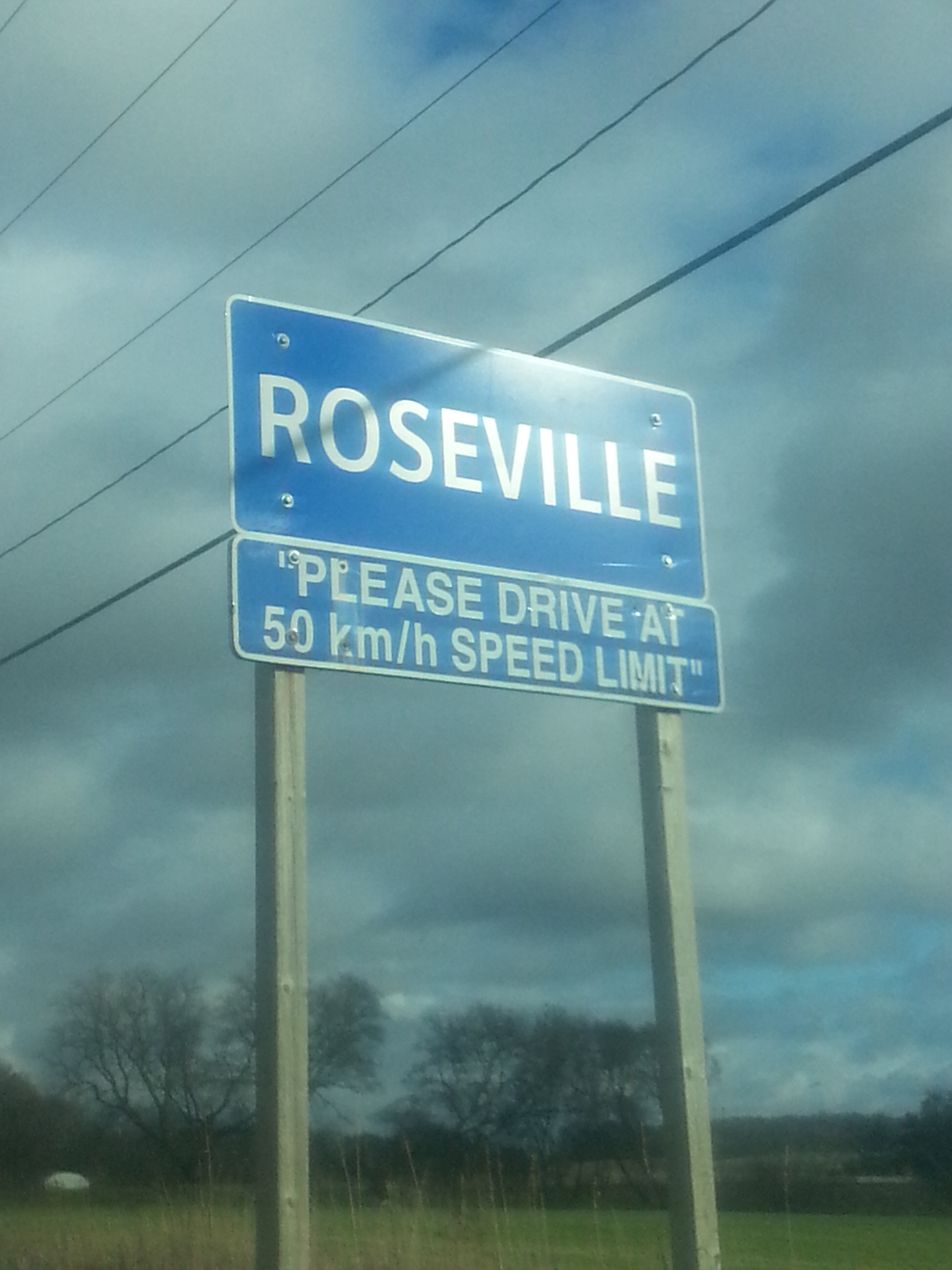
- Town sign in Roseville, Ontario

- Location within Regional Municipality of Waterloo Location within Southern Ontario
- Coordinates: 43°20′35″N 80°28′32″W
- Country: Canada
- Province: Ontario
- Regional municipality: Waterloo
- Township: North Dumfries
- Time zone: UTC-5 (EST)
  - Summer (DST): UTC-4 (EDT)
- Forward sortation area: N0B 1E0
- Area codes: 519 and 226
- NTS Map: 040P08
- GNBC Code: FCMGD

Roseville is a community in Ontario, Canada located at 43°20′35″N 80°28′31″W. It is within the rural township of North Dumfries, which forms part of the Region of Waterloo, and is located between Ayr, Kitchener and Highway 401.

There is another community in Ontario named Roseville located in the Regional Municipality of Durham near Uxbridge.

== History ==
=== Early settlement ===
The area around what would become Roseville was settled by Europeans during the 1820s. This first wave was a mix of Scottish and Pennsylvania German settlers, who occupied lots in Concessions 10–12 of Dumfries Township along the Roseville, Cedar Creek, and New Dundee roads. One local history claims that the Roseville Road had been a "Native American trail" before European settlement, and afterward was used as a bush road that led to a lime kiln north of the village. Families such as Bricker, Detweiler, Clemens, Johnston, Reynolds, and Crumbeck were early settlers. These families lived in log homes which usually consisted of a single room with a loft, and were heated by an open fireplace.

By 1824, Jacob Rosenberger had arrived. He was from Montgomery County, Pennsylvania and had purchased 160 acres (65 ha) of land in Concession 12 on the Roseville Road. He subdivided this land into smaller lots, which became the site of some of the first village buildings. Rosenberger left within a decade for the nearby Beverley Township, and later died of cholera during the 1834 epidemic.

=== Name ===
Several popular etymologies exist around the origin of Roseville's name. The one considered most plausible by the local historian rych mills is that it is derivative from Rosenberger's name, given his role in the development of the village.

More fanciful explanations include one published in the 1920s by the antiquarian William J. Wintemberg, based on an interview with a Roseville resident named Louis Kaiser. In this version, "Roseville" was back-formed from "Rose-will", with "will" being Pennsylvania Dutch for "wants". The explanation for this is that an early resident named Rose was "always looking for drinks".

Another origin suggested in histories written in the 1950s and 1960s was that it was based on the name of an early resident, who was an English shoemaker named Rose.

=== Later development ===
Records from 1864 indicate that Roseville, nine miles from Berlin (Kitchener), had a sawmill owned by Henry Bricker, a general store, a school, two hotels, and a post office; the population was about 150. In 1880, the population was about 200. There were some stores and shops, a school and churches.

During its history, Roseville has had two taverns, two hotels, four churches, three schools, a sawmill, and a shingle factory. There has also been a wagon and carriage works, a blacksmith shop, a printing shop, two cooper shops, a turnip factory, a post office, a candy store, a shoe shop, and a general store.

== Demographics ==
In the 2021 Census of Population conducted by Statistics Canada, Roseville had a population of 342 living in 108 of its 112 total private dwellings, a change of 1.2% from its 2016 population of 338. With a land area of 0.4 km^{2} (0.15 sq mi), it had a population density of 855.0/km^{2} (2,214.4/sq mi) in 2021.
