= Ferguson, Ontario =

Coordinates: 45.481696°N 80.000780°W

Ferguson is an unincorporated community in Ontario, Canada. It is recognized as a designated place by Statistics Canada.

== Demographics ==
In the 2021 Census of Population conducted by Statistics Canada, Ferguson had a population of 352 living in 178 of its 388 total private dwellings, a change of -10.2% from its 2016 population of 392. With a land area of 46.3 km^{2} (17.9 sq mi), it had a population density of 7.6/km^{2} (19.7/sq mi) in 2021.

== See also ==
- List of communities in Ontario
- List of designated places in Ontario
