= McGregor Bay, Ontario =

Unincorporated community in Ontario, Canada

Coordinates: 46.084339°N 81.647045°W

McGregor Bay is an unincorporated community in Ontario, Canada. It is recognized as a designated place by Statistics Canada.

== Geography ==
McGregor Bay is on the LaCloche Peninsula within the Manitoulin District.

== Demographics ==
In the 2021 Census of Population conducted by Statistics Canada, McGregor Bay 201 had a population of 201 living in 83 of its 175 total private dwellings, a change of 1910% from its 2016 population of 10. With a land area of 50.92 km^{2} (19.66 sq mi), it had a population density of 3.9/km^{2} (10.2/sq mi) in 2021.

Population of McGregor Bay
Name	Population (2021)	Population (2016)	Change	Land area (km^{2})	Population density
McGregor Bay part A	201	10	+1,910.0%	38.69	5.2/km^{2}
McGregor Bay part B	0	0	NA	12.23	0.0/km^{2}
Total	201	10	+1,910.0%	50.92	3.9/km^{2}

== See also ==
- List of communities in Ontario
- List of designated places in Ontario
