= Anna Beecroft Briggs =

Canadian-born American organist and writer

Anna Beecroft Briggs (1860s-1949) was a Canadian-born American writer of plays and educational articles. Born in Greenbank, Ontario, Canada, she initially pursued a career as an organist and choir leader before deafness caused her to transition to writing. Briggs edited the Canadian Ladies' Home Journal and was a prolific contributor of essays, articles, and verse to American journals such as Good Housekeeping and the Ladies' Home Journal. After relocating to Los Angeles, California, she turned her civic interests to prison reform and crime detection, which she incorporated into several of her later plays, including The Jury Deliberates.

== Early life and education ==
Anna Beecroft was born in Greenbank, Ontario, Canada, in the 1860s. (Note: Winter (1978) records Anna's year of birth as 1860. Lawrence (1927) records that she was born in Toronto, Canada, on March 15, 1864. Binheim (1928) records her birth being in Canada, on March 15, 1865.) Her parents were Alvary and Margaret Beecroft. Briggs grew up in Saintfield.

She was educated in public schools. Having musical talents, she toured her local district with singing schools.

== Career ==
Deciding to become a music teacher, for many years in her early career, Briggs was an organist and choir leader.

Unable to continue as a music teacher after becoming deaf, she turned her attention to writing. In the late 1890s, Briggs forged her writing career as editor of the Canadian Ladies' Home Journal, while also contributing poems and articles to magazines. Briggs contributed essays, editorials, special articles and verse to several American journals, including Good Housekeeping, Ladies' Home Journal, Progress Magazine, Canadian Magazine, Mind, and Boston Brown Book. She was a prolific writer of letters, including state governors and U.S. presidents such as Woodrow Wilson.

It is a hopeful sign of the times that the number Is slowly but surely increasing who believe that society can best protect itself by the application of science, Christian ethics, and a study of human nature in restoring and lifting up the fallen and that there is no justification for depriving them of life or even of 'liberty and the pursuit of happiness' to the extent now practiced especially in the treatment of youthful offenders." (Anna B. Briggs, Los Angeles Evening Post-Record, 1927)

Her civic interests turned to prisoner rights, prison reform, and crime detection. These topics were woven into several of her plays, including Courts of Injustice (1916), The Jury Deliberates (one-act play, 1925) The Vanishing Jury (1929), Sensations, and Heart Beats (1942). Heart Beats gave rise to several Hollywood actors.

Briggs was a member of the Southern California Woman's Press Club, Verse Writers Club, Drama League, and Playcrafters.

== Awards and honors ==
- 1927, First prize, Southern California Woman's Press Club contest for one act plays
- 1928, First prize, Southern California Woman's Press Club contest for one act plays

== Personal life ==
In 1892, she married D. Leslie Briggs, who kept a store in Myrtle, Ontario. They had two children.

A few years after marriage, the couple relocated to Toronto, with Mr. Briggs entering the seed business with a brother. Mrs. Briggs became deaf around this time and learned to lip read. In 1914, for health reasons, she removed to Los Angeles, California, her husband joining later.

During a European tour, she met Bernard Shaw.

Anna Beecroft Briggs died at her home in Los Angeles, on September 7, 1949; internment was at Forest Lawn. (Note: Whitby (1978) gave Anna's age at time of death as 89, while her Los Angeles Times obituary recorded her as being 87.)

== Selected works ==
- Courts of Injustice (1916)
- The Jury Deliberates (1925)
- The Vanishing Jury (1929)
- Sensations
- Heart Beats: A Comedy Drama in Three Acts (1942) (text)
