= Branchton, Ontario =

Human settlement in Ontario, Canada

Coordinates: 43.310888°N 80.259288°W

Branchton is an unincorporated community in Ontario, Canada. It is recognized as a designated place by Statistics Canada.

The settlement was named for its location on the Galt-Brantford branch of the Great Western Railway, abandoned in 1986.

== Demographics ==
In the 2021 Census of Population conducted by Statistics Canada, Branchton had a population of 355 living in 129 of its 129 total private dwellings, a change of -5.3% from its 2016 population of 375. With a land area of 0.59 km^{2} (0.23 sq mi), it had a population density of 601.7/km^{2} (1,558.4/sq mi) in 2021.

== See also ==
- List of communities in Ontario
- List of designated places in Ontario
