= List of ports on the Great Lakes =

Below is a list of ports in the Great Lakes region, which includes Lake Erie, Lake Huron, Lake Michigan, Lake Ontario, and Lake Superior, as well as the smaller Lake St. Clair.

== Lake Superior ==
=== Michigan ===
- Houghton
- Marquette
- Munising
- Sault Ste. Marie

=== Ontario ===
- Sault Ste. Marie
- Thunder Bay
- Wawa
- Heron Bay
- Marathon

=== Minnesota ===
- Duluth
- Two Harbors
- Silver Bay
- Taconite Harbor

=== Wisconsin ===
- Superior
- Ashland
- Bayfield
- La Pointe

== Lake Michigan ==
=== Michigan ===
- Benton Harbor
- Brevort
- Escanaba
- Frankfort
- Grand Haven
- Holland
- Ludington
- Manistee
- Manistique
- Menominee
- Muskegon
- Naubinway
- New Buffalo
- Pentwater
- Petoskey
- St. Joseph
- South Haven
- Traverse City
- Port Inland
- Charlevoix
- Port Sheldon

=== Indiana ===
- Michiana Shores
- Michigan City
- Hammond
- Gary
- East Chicago
- Burns Harbor
- Portage

=== Illinois ===
- Calumet City
- Chicago
- Waukegan

=== Wisconsin ===
- Milwaukee
- Kenosha
- Racine
- Manitowoc
- Sturgeon Bay
- Green Bay
- Howard
- Oconto
- Marinette
- Sheboygan
- Port Washington
- Two Rivers
- Kewaunee

== Lake Huron ==
=== Michigan ===
- St. Ignace
- Cheboygan
- Rogers City
- Alpena
- Harrisville
- East Tawas
- Tawas City
- Standish
- Bay City
- Port Austin
- Sandusky
- Port Huron
- De tour Village
- Drummond Township

=== Ontario ===
- Sarnia
- Goderich
- Owen Sound
- Thessalon
- The North Shore
- McGregor Bay
- Midland
- Collingwood
- Penetanguishene
- Wiarton
- Tobermory
- Tehkummah
- Little Current
- Parry Sound

== Lake Saint Clair ==
=== Michigan ===
- Algonac
- Mount Clemens
- Detroit
- St Clair
- Marine City

=== Ontario ===
- Windsor
- Tecumseh

== Lake Erie ==
=== Michigan ===
- Monroe
- Luna Pier

=== Ohio ===
- Ashtabula
- Cleveland
- Conneaut
- Fairport
- Lorain
- Sandusky
- Toledo
- Huron
- Put in Bay
- Lakeside Marblehead
- Port Clinton
- Rocky River

=== Pennsylvania ===
- Erie

=== New York ===
- Buffalo
- Niagara Falls
- Dunkirk

=== Ontario ===
- Kingsville
- Leamington
- Nanticoke
- Niagara Falls
- Port Colborne
- Port Stanley
- Port Maitland
- Port Burwell
- Port Dover
- Amherstburg
- LaSalle

== Lake Ontario ==
=== New York ===
- Rochester
- Alexandria Bay
- Oswego
- Clayton

=== Ontario ===
- Toronto
- Hamilton
- St. Catharines
- Picton
- Port Weller
- Oshawa
- Kingston
- Oakville
- Bronte
- Mississauga
- Port Hope
- Cobourg
- Cramahe
- Belleville
- Bath
