= Beverley Township, Ontario =

Township in Home District, Upper Canada

Coordinates: 43°18′N 80°10′W

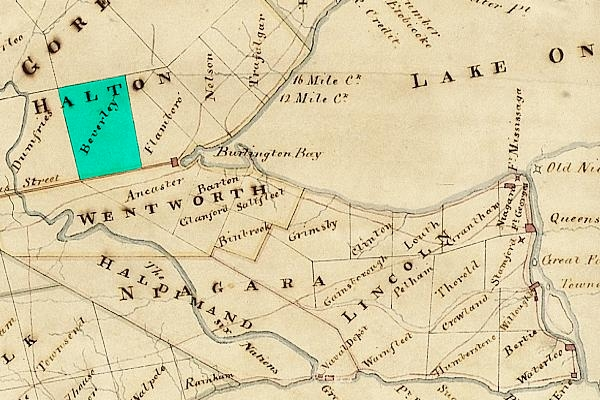
Beverley Township highlighted in green on an 1818 map.

Beverley Township was a township established in 1792 in Home District in the then Upper Canada, today Ontario, Canada. It was named for the town of Beverley in the East Riding of Yorkshire, England, by John Graves Simcoe.

In 1974, part of Beverley Township joined North Dumfries Township, while the remainder was amalgamed with West Flamborough and East Flamborough. The area is now part of the city of Hamilton.

== See also ==
- List of townships in Ontario
- Westover, Ontario
- Clyde, Ontario - a settlement in Beverly Township
