= Sonya, Ontario =

Sonya
- Unincorporated community
- Interactive map of Sonya
- Coordinates: 44°13′59″N 78°57′27″W
- Country: Canada
- Province: Ontario
- Regional municipality: Durham
- City: Kawartha Lakes
- Time zone: UTC-5 (EST)
  - Summer (DST): UTC-4 (EDT)
- Forward sortation area: L??
- Area codes: 905 and 289
- NTS Map: 031D02
- GNBC Code: FCQAH

Sonya (pronounced Sawn•ya) is a small hamlet in Durham Region and the City of Kawartha Lakes in Ontario, Canada. It is located 3 km north of Seagrave on Simcoe Street, also known as Regional Road 2.

A recently constructed sub-division has expanded the hamlet from about 15 houses to more than 30. At one time it had a railroad station, as part of the Whitby, Port Perry, and Lindsay Railroad, a post office, a blacksmith shop, and a general store. The railroad closed in the 1940s and the general store was destroyed by fire in the 1950s. The railroad trackbed is still visible just west of the hamlet where it crossed the concession road, and the station, now gone, was located just north of the road.

The former Knox Presbyterian Church, built in 1893, is now a private residence, after closing in the 1980s.

The village park land is now surrounded by the new subdivision and was once home to the Sonya Sleigh Riders baseball team.

== Demographics ==
In the 2021 Census of Population conducted by Statistics Canada, Sonya had a population of 60 living in 20 of its 21 total private dwellings, a change of 20% from its 2016 population of 50. With a land area of 0.15 km^{2} (0.058 sq mi), it had a population density of 400.0/km^{2} (1,036.0/sq mi) in 2021.
