= Heidelberg Center for Latin America =

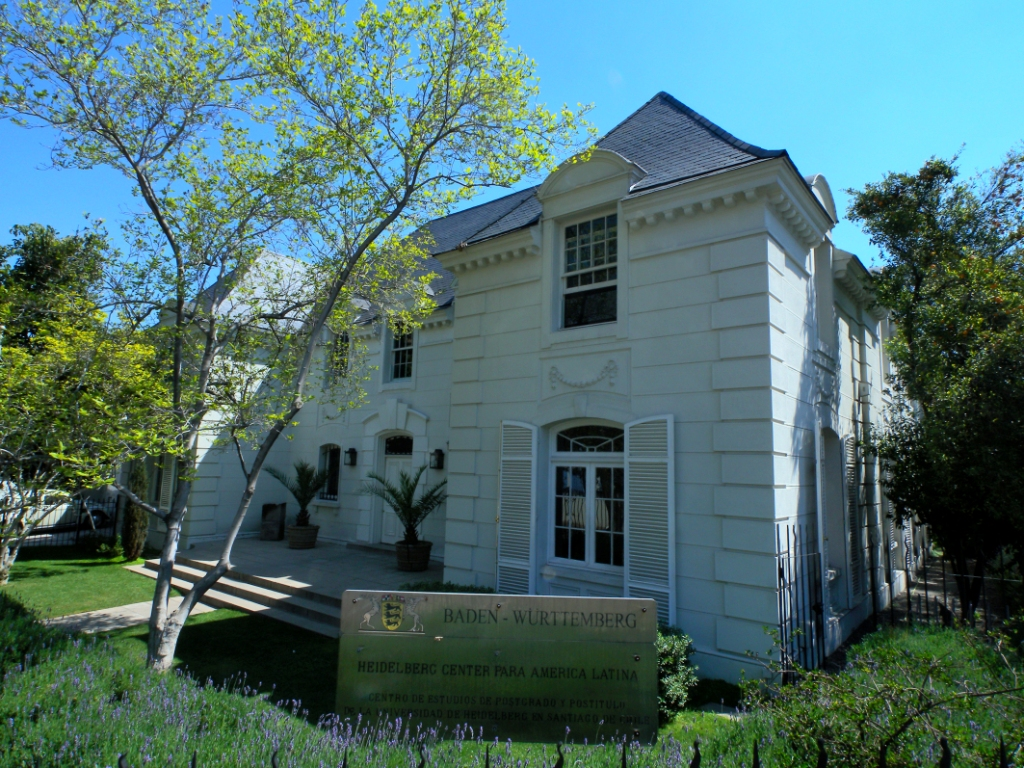
Heidelberg Center for Latin America

The Heidelberg Center for Latin America (Spanish: Heidelberg Center para América Latina; German: Heidelberg Center Lateinamerika) is a postgraduate institute in Santiago de Chile affiliated with Heidelberg University. It was founded in 2001 and officially opened on 9 April 2002. It is the only European-affiliated university in Chile.
