= Heidelberg Wellesley, Ontario =

Community in Ontario, Canada

Coordinates: 43.523039°N 80.622443°W

Heidelberg Wellesley is an unincorporated community in Ontario, Canada, in the Township of Wellesley, Regional Municipality of Waterloo. It is recognized as a designated place by Statistics Canada.

== Demographics ==
In the 2021 Census of Population conducted by Statistics Canada, Heidelberg Wellesley had a population of 392 living in 149 of its 150 total private dwellings, a change of 1.3% from its 2016 population of 387. With a land area of 0.38 km^{2} (0.15 sq mi), it had a population density of 1,031.6/km^{2} (2,671.8/sq mi) in 2021.

== See also ==
- List of communities in Ontario
- List of designated places in Ontario
