= Heidelberg Woolwich, Ontario =

Community in Ontario, Canada

Coordinates: 43.524779°N 80.616086°W

Heidelberg Woolwich is an unincorporated community in Ontario, Canada, in the Township of Woolwich, Regional Municipality of Waterloo. It is recognized as a designated place by Statistics Canada.

== Demographics ==
In the 2021 Census of Population conducted by Statistics Canada, Heidelberg Woolwich had a population of 640 living in 227 of its 232 total private dwellings, a change of -3.9% from its 2016 population of 666. With a land area of 0.55 km^{2} (0.21 sq mi), it had a population density of 1,163.6/km^{2} (3,013.8/sq mi) in 2021.

== See also ==
- List of communities in Ontario
- List of designated places in Ontario
