= Lists of communities in Ontario =

There are various lists of communities in Ontario, grouped by status, type or location:

- List of census subdivisions in Ontario - local municipalities, First Nations reserves and settlements, unorganized areas
- List of cities in Ontario - places which are incorporated as cities
- List of francophone communities in Ontario - places which are designated as French language service areas due to having a significant minority or majority Franco-Ontarian population
- List of municipalities in Ontario - all incorporated municipalities in the province regardless of type
- List of population centres in Ontario - urban areas, without regard to municipal boundaries
- List of towns in Ontario - places which are incorporated as towns
- List of township municipalities in Ontario - places with the municipal status of township
- List of unincorporated communities in Ontario - places which are not incorporated, but exist as neighbourhoods or settlements inside larger municipal entities
- List of villages in Ontario - places which are incorporated as villages
