= Keswick High School =

Location
- 100 Biscayne Boulevard; Keswick, Ontario, L4P 3L5; Canada; 44°13′24″N 79°27′28″W

Information
- School type: High school
- School board: York Region District School Board
- Principal: Casey Daleman
- Grades: 9-12
- Enrolment: 895 (October 2018)
- Language: English
- Colours: Red and white
- Mascot: Cougar
- Website: www.yrdsb.ca/schools/keswick.hs
- Last updated: November 2024

Keswick High School is a public high school in the York Region District School Board. It is located in Keswick, Ontario, and serves Grade 9 to 12 students from the growing Keswick community. It follows the curriculum standards set by the Ontario Ministry of Education and was officially opened in September 2000.

== History ==
Construction began in 1998. The school was built in order to accommodate the rising population of its surrounding suburban area, which continues to grow in rapid numbers. Previously, residents of the town of Georgina (including, among others, the communities of Keswick, Sutton, Pefferlaw, and Udora) commuted to Sutton District High School. However, the population count of the Sutton D.H.S. surpassed 2200, and would only rise due in part to the double cohort. Already well above its intended capacity, Keswick High School was built.

== Notable events ==
- Visual Arts teacher James Ruddle lived in a box for 66 hours, painting the inside of it.
- In 2009, an Asian student was the victim of an alleged racially motivated assault. After he fought back, he was charged with assault and threatened with expulsion by his school. 400 students walked out of the high school to protest bullying and stand up against racism. Despite the fact that the Asian student previously had an excellent record and only threw one punch, apparently in self-defence against a racially motivated attack, the principal had originally called for the extreme measure of expelling him from all schools in the region. It was particularly sensitive because of a series of attacks on Asian fishermen in the same area in 2007, which led to an investigation by the Ontario Human Rights Commission.

== See also ==
- Education in Ontario
- List of secondary schools in Ontario
- York Region District School Board
- Keswick, Ontario
- Georgina, Ontario
