= Georgina Public Libraries =

Georgina Public Library
- Location: 261 Garrett Styles Drive, Keswick, ON, L4P 0T4 90 Wexford Drive, Keswick, ON L4P 3P7 5279 Black River Road, Sutton, ON L0E 1R0 76 Pete's Lane, Pefferlaw, ON L0E 1N0
- Established: 1986
- Branches: 4

Access and use
- Population served: 46,000

Other information
- Director: Joseph Moncada
- Employees: 43 including student and occasional staff members
- Website: http://www.georginalibrary.ca

Georgina Public Library is a library system in Georgina, Ontario, Canada with locations in Keswick, Sutton and Pefferlaw. It was founded when the Town of Georgina was formed from North Gwillimbury Township, the Village of Sutton, and Township of Georgina in 1986.

It has four community-based branches that serve the information, entertainment, and learning needs of clients through children, teens, young adults, and adult programs, services, and collections. The branches share staff, collections, resources, and policies and work collaboratively to meet the needs of all communities within the town including Baldwin, Jackson's Point, Port Bolster, Sibbald Point, Virginia, and Udora.

== History ==
Georgina Public Library evolved out of individual community libraries. Keswick's first public library was founded in the 1960s, and housed in the Optimist International Hall before being moved to a former post office building beside the fire fighters and police stations. Doris Brown was the first librarian and she led the library from its inception until her retirement in 1978. The Keswick branch moved into the much larger Stephen Leacock Centre in 1985 following a vigorous fundraising campaign with Whipper Billy Watson. Branches in Sutton and Pefferlaw served community needs but outgrew their physical space and the Town opened a new Pefferlaw Branch in 1989. In 1996, the Sutton branch was incorporated into a new shared facility with York Region's public and separate school boards on Black River Road. Keswick's branch moved to a shared facility in the Georgina Ice Palace on Wexford Drive and Woodbine Avenue in 2002. The library is a member of the Ontario Library Consortium.

== Services ==
The library is growing to meet the demands of a developing community as Georgina becomes increasingly part of the expansive Greater Toronto Area. Recent changes include a revamped children's area in Keswick, laptop stations in both Keswick and Sutton, and countless aesthetic changes. Various programs are hosted by Georgina Public Library for everyone from babies to adults. These range from Reading Circle and Tween Team in Keswick, to Sewing and Yoga in Sutton. As well, there are several annual programs held by the Children's and Youth Services around Halloween and Christmas. The branches offer free Wi-Fi and computer access, as well as computer literacy courses. The material collection includes fiction and non-fiction books for kids, teens, and adults, DVD's, audiobooks, e-books, magazines, newspapers, and video games. Patrons may also order interlibrary loans as well as enjoy reciprocal loan privileges with neighbouring library systems.

== Photo gallery ==
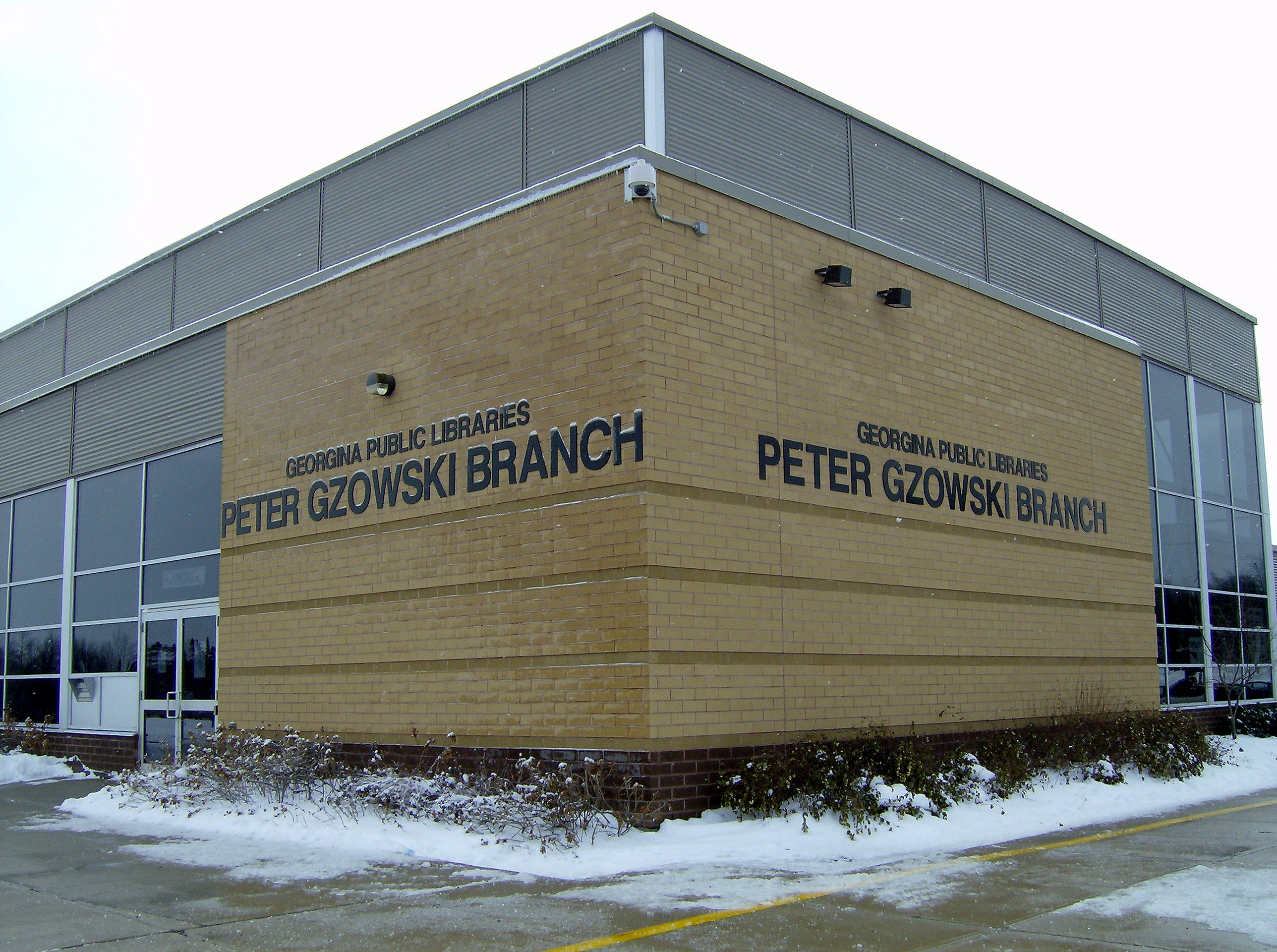
Exterior of the Sutton branch named in honour of broadcaster Peter Gzowski.

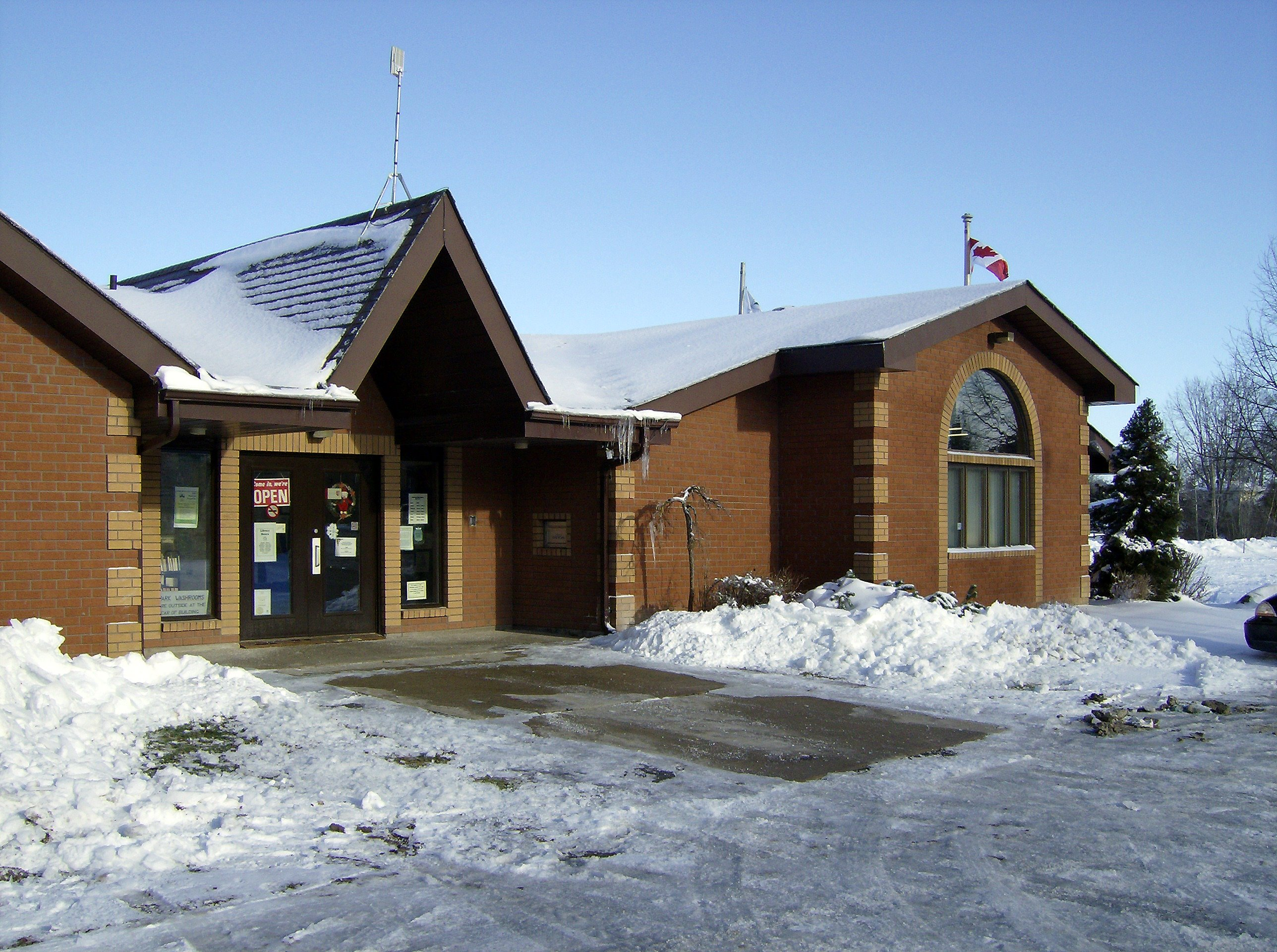
Pefferlaw branch on a sunny winter morning.

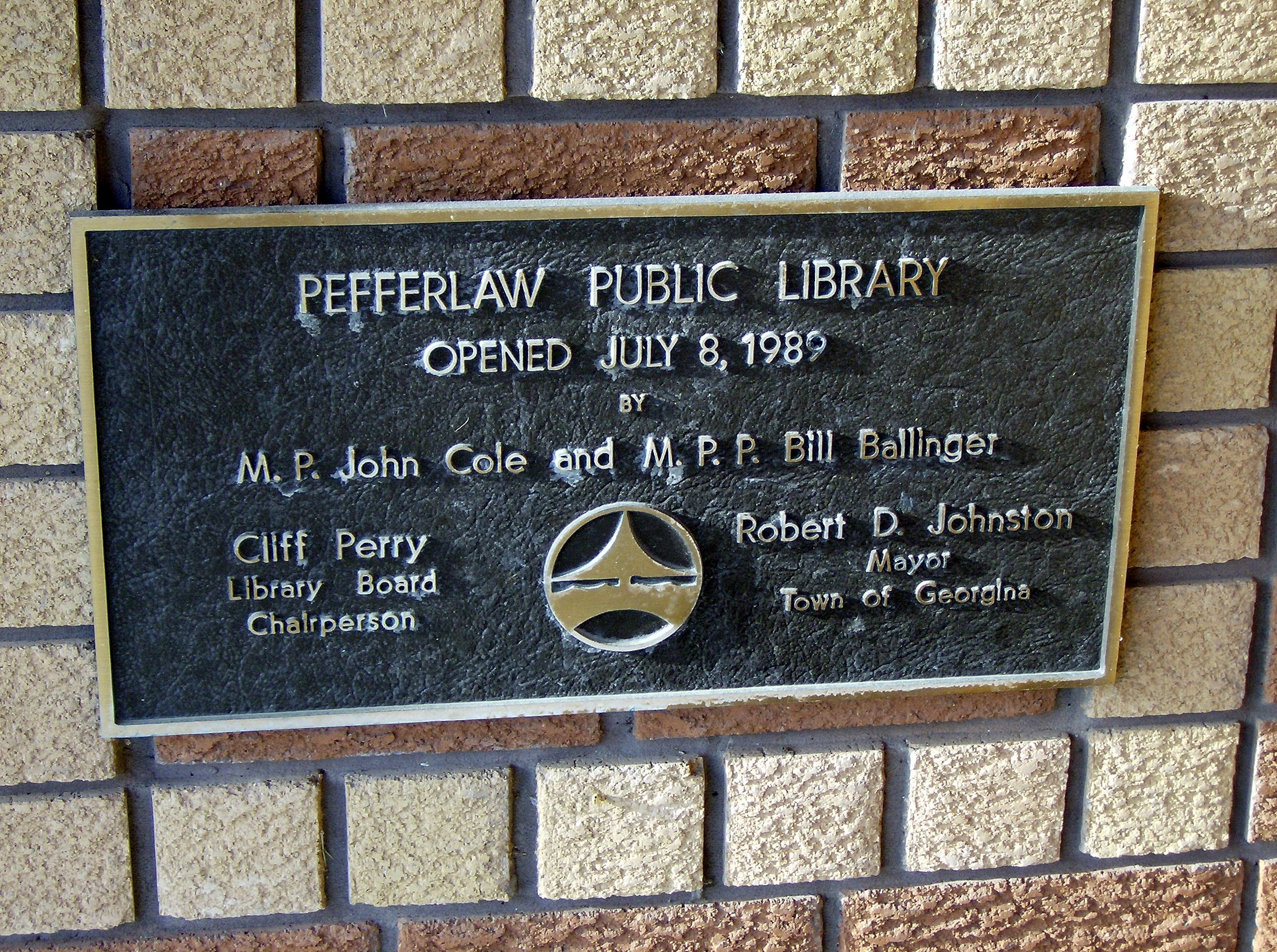
Plaque on opening dedication.

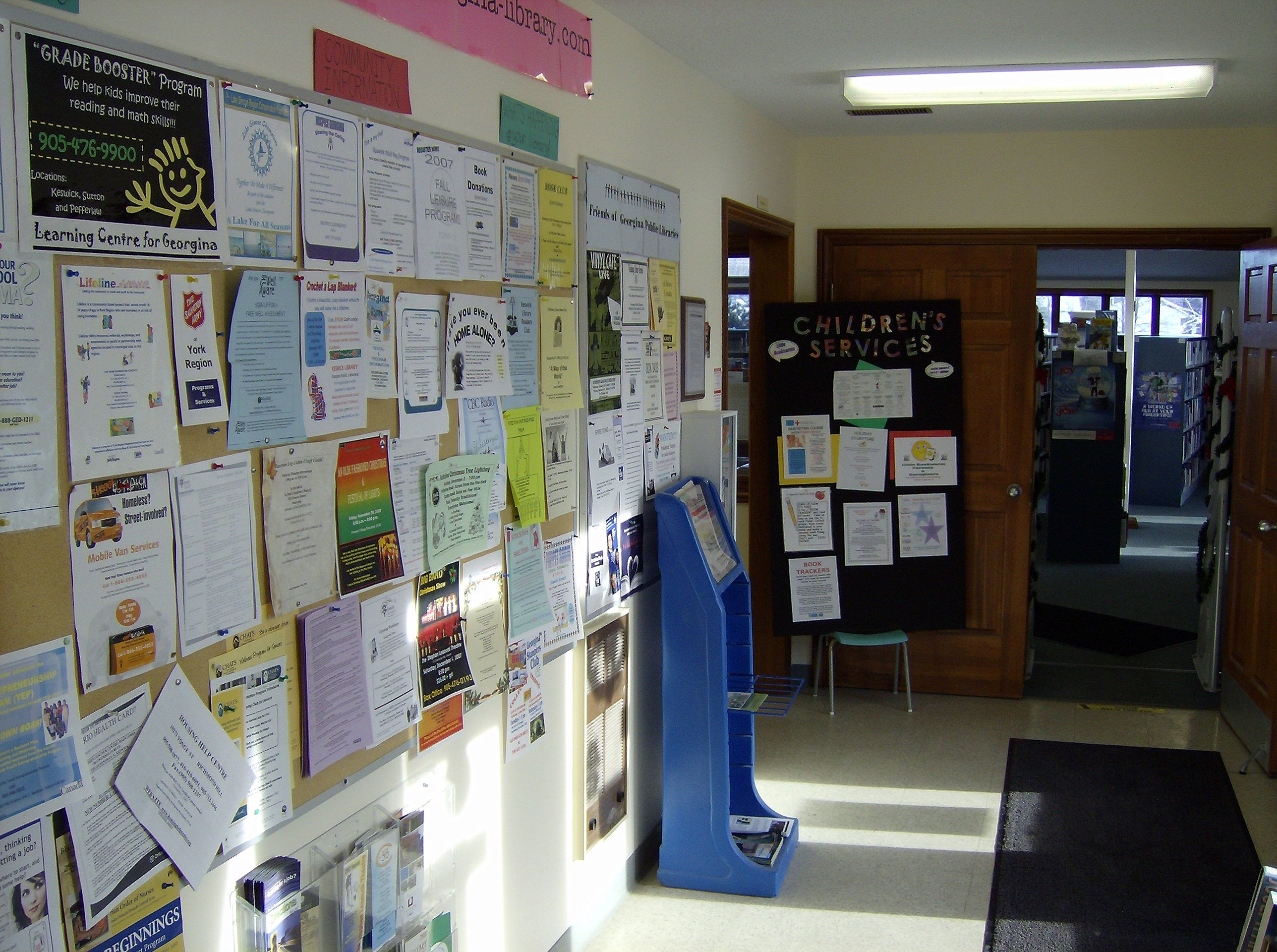
The busy bulletin board in the Pefferlaw branch.

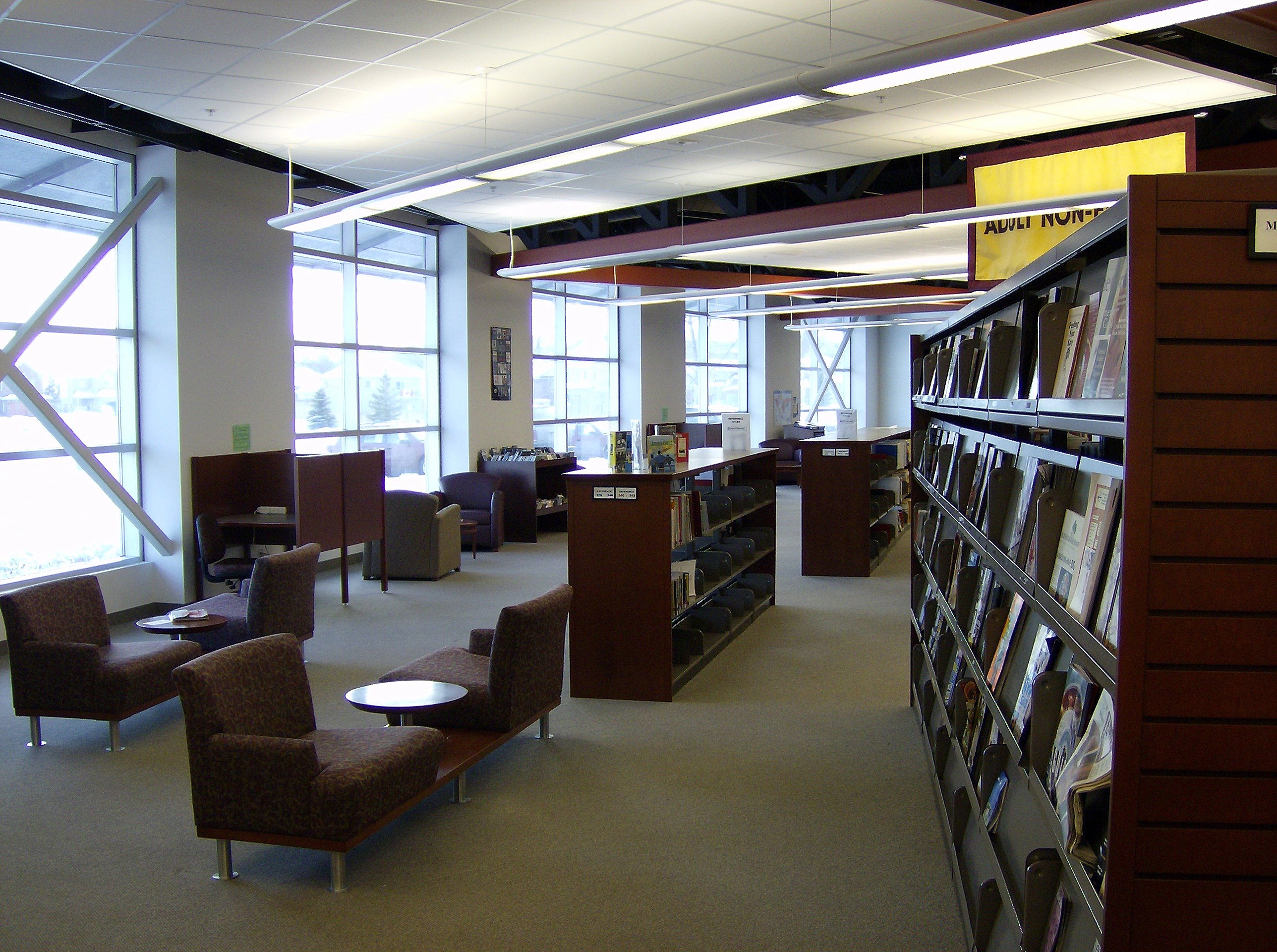
Keswick branch's interior allows natural light.

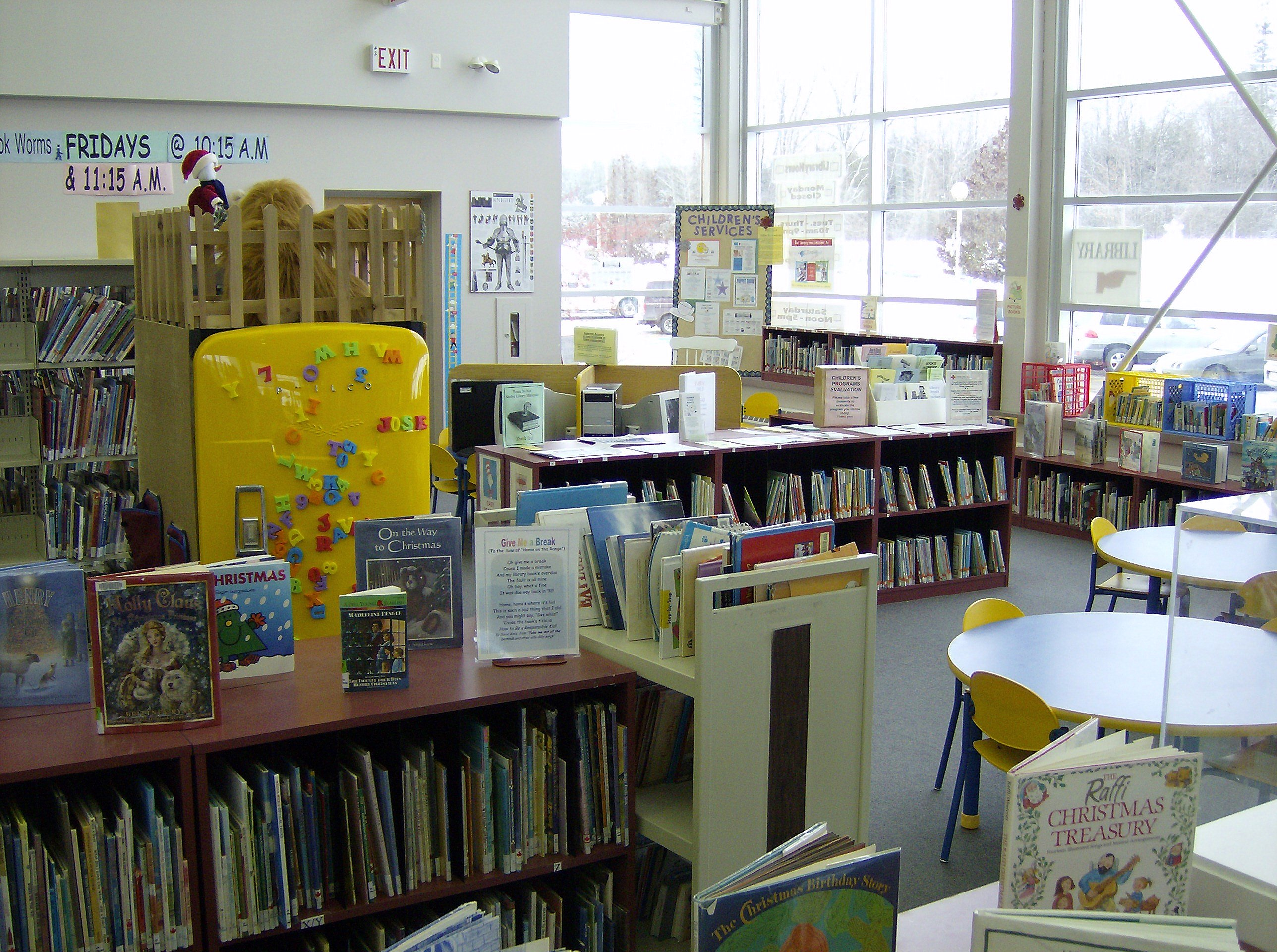
Sutton's branch Children's area.

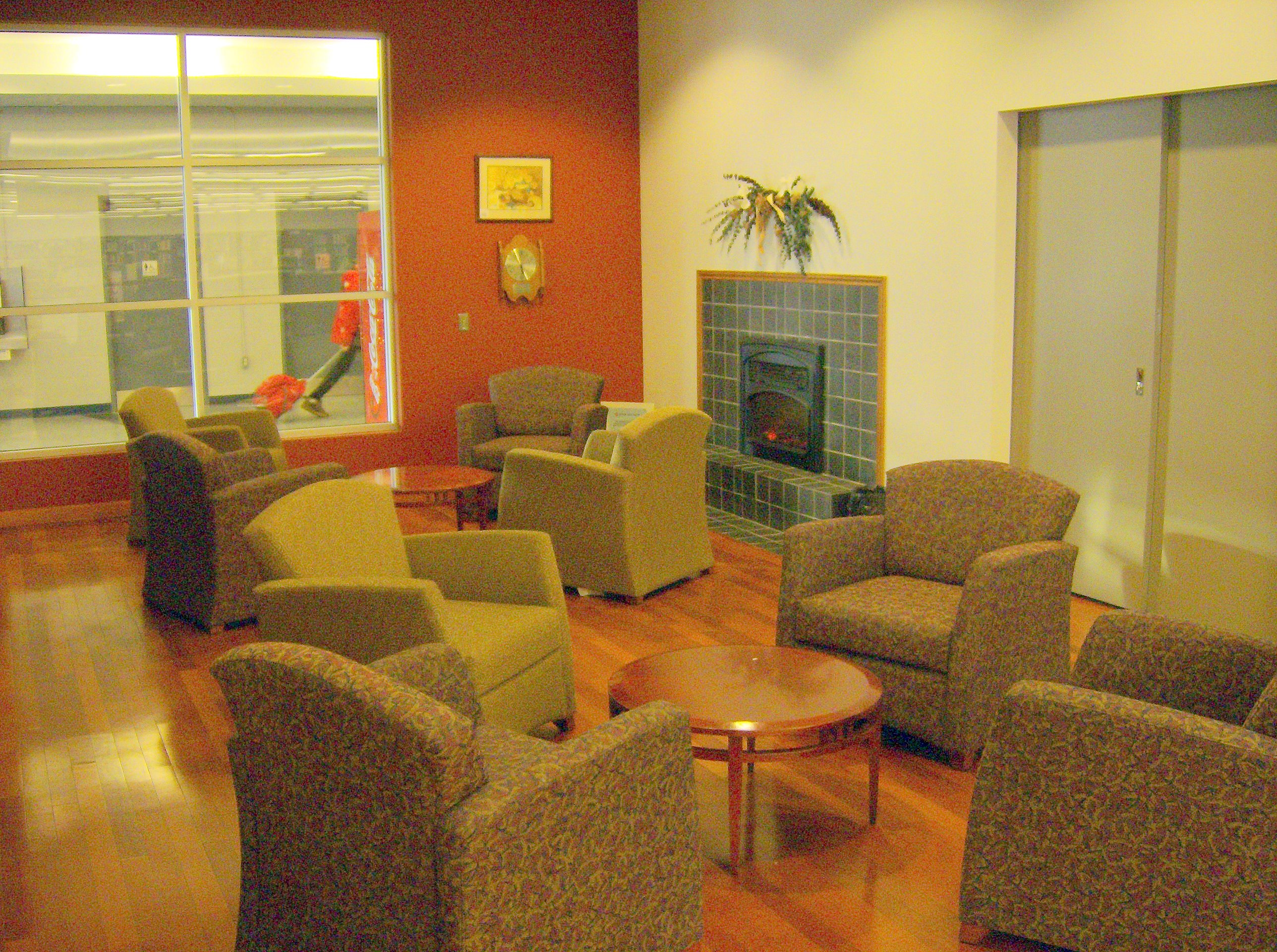
Keswick branch's reading lounge includes a fireplace.

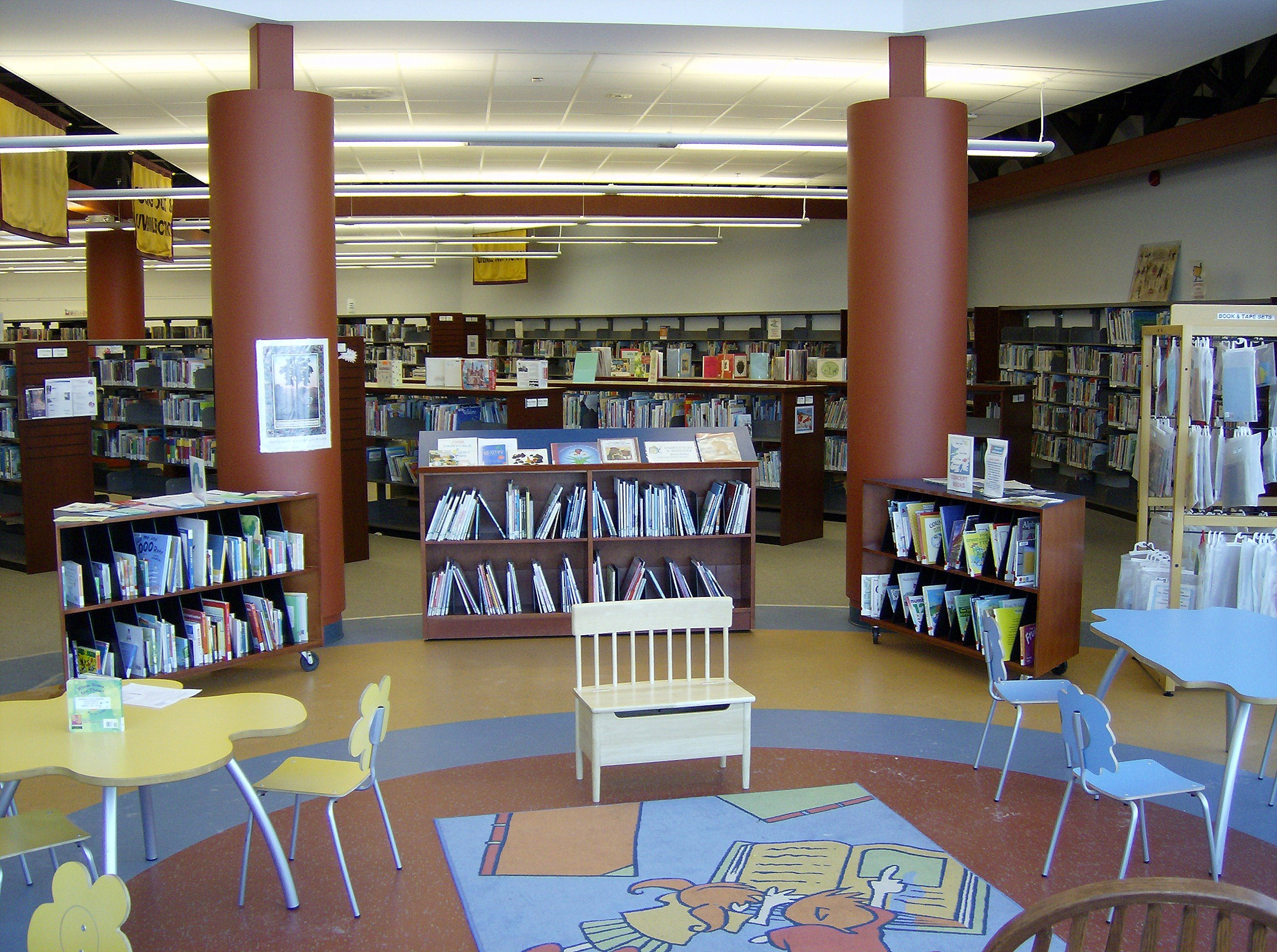
Keswick branch's kid’s area.

== See also ==
- Ontario Public Libraries
