= Sutton District High School =

Location
- 20798 Dalton Road; Sutton West, Ontario, L0E 1R0; 44°18′10″N 79°21′43″W

Information
- School type: High school
- Founded: 1929; 97 years ago
- School board: York Region District School Board
- Superintendent: Michael Grieve
- Area trustee: Carolyn Butterworth
- Principal: Joe Foti
- Grades: 9-12
- Enrolment: 483 (September 2025)
- Language: English
- Colours: Blue and White
- Mascot: Skippy the Sabre
- Team name: Sabres
- Affiliation: Secular
- Website: www.yrdsb.ca/schools/suttondistrict.hs/
- Last updated: September 2014

Sutton District High School is a public high school in the York Region District School Board with approximately 500 students. It is located in Sutton, Ontario, Canada and serves Grade 9 to 12 students. It is the primary secondary school for most communities in the town of Georgina, including Sutton West, Pefferlaw, and Udora. It had previously served the town's largest community, Keswick, but this changed with the opening of Keswick High School in 2000.

== History ==
Sutton D.H.S. opened its doors in 1956. Revisions were made in 1962, and again in 1969.

== Student life ==
The school offers a variety of athletic programs for students, including lacrosse, basketball, soccer, rugby, volleyball, baseball, hockey, and more. As of September 2016, the school is a member of the FIRST Robotics Competition. Their team number is 6514, and their name is the Sutton Robotics League. In addition to sports, the school has a student council and an athletic council.

== See also ==
- Education in Ontario
- List of secondary schools in Ontario
- York Region District School Board
- Sutton, Ontario
- Georgina, Ontario
