= List of historic places in Regional Municipality of York =

This is a list of historic places in Regional Municipality of York, Ontario, containing heritage sites listed on the Canadian Register of Historic Places (CRHP), all of which are designated as historic places either locally, provincially, territorially, nationally, or by more than one level of government.

== List of historic places ==
| Name | Address | Coordinates | Government recognition (CRHP №) | Wikidata ID | Image |
|---|---|---|---|---|---|
| Armoury | 89 Mosley Street; Aurora ON | 43°59′56″N 79°27′43″W | Federal (7519) | | More images |
| Aurora Post Office | 15213 Yonge Street; Aurora ON | 43°59′56″N 79°28′02″W | Aurora municipality (7299) | | More images |
| Ballymore Farmhouse | 26 Hadley Court; Aurora ON | 44°01′30″N 79°26′59″W | Aurora municipality (8914) | | More images |
| Canadian National Railway Station | 135 Wellington Street; Aurora ON | 44°00′03″N 79°27′35″W | Federal (6500) | | More images |
| The Carpenter's House | 69 Wellington Street East; Aurora ON | 44°00′02″N 79°27′49″W | Aurora municipality (6406) | | More images |
| Church Street School | 22 Church Street; Aurora ON | 43°59′50″N 79°27′56″W | Ontario (10401), Aurora municipality (6379) | | More images |
| The Dead House | 14253 Yonge Street; Aurora ON | 43°58′36″N 79°27′40″W | Aurora municipality (8931) | | More images |
| Elmwood Lodge | 15032 Yonge Street; Aurora ON | 43°59′39″N 79°28′00″W | Aurora municipality (9031) | | More images |
| Enos Lundy House | 938 St. John's Sideroad; Aurora ON | 44°01′31″N 79°26′41″W | Aurora municipality (8927) | | More images |
| Hartman's Corners Schoolhouse | 118 Wellington Street; Aurora ON | 44°00′05″N 79°27′39″W | Aurora municipality (8928) | | More images |
| Hillary House | 15372 Yonge Street; Aurora ON | 44°00′10″N 79°28′07″W | Federal (11951), Aurora municipality (8826) | | More images |
| Horton Place | 15342 Yonge Street; Aurora ON | 44°00′07″N 79°28′07″W | Aurora municipality (8661) | | More images |
| The Keeper's House | 14253 Yonge Street; Aurora ON | 43°58′35″N 79°27′42″W | Aurora municipality (8932) | | More images |
| Morrison House | 74 Wellington Street East; Aurora ON | 44°00′02″N 79°27′48″W | Aurora municipality (8917) | | More images |
| Northeast Old Aurora Heritage Conservation District | Aurora ON | 44°00′08″N 79°27′55″W | Aurora municipality (8929) | | |
| The Pugh House | 106 Wells Street; Aurora ON | 43°59′45″N 79°27′46″W | Aurora municipality (8916) | | More images |
| Aurora Radial Railway Bridge Abutment | 520 Industrial Parkway South; Aurora ON | 43°58′56″N 79°27′43″W | Aurora municipality (8930) | | More images |
| The Red House | 16003 Yonge Street; Aurora ON | 44°01′02″N 79°28′13″W | Aurora municipality (8933) | | More images |
| The Roderick and Ethel Smith House | 88 Wells Street; Aurora ON | 43°59′48″N 79°27′47″W | Aurora municipality (8934) | | More images |
| W. Lewis Stephens House | 97 Wells Street; Aurora ON | 43°59′47″N 79°27′45″W | Aurora municipality (18580) | | More images |
| The Walter Grice House | 89 Wells Street; Aurora ON | 43°59′48″N 79°27′45″W | Aurora municipality (8915) | | More images |
| Willow Farm | 15900 Yonge Street; Aurora ON | 44°00′57″N 79°28′23″W | Aurora municipality (8919) | | More images |
| Wilton Barn | 13831 Leslie Street; Aurora ON | 43°58′33″N 79°24′35″W | Aurora municipality (8918) | | More images |
| Sharon Temple National Historic Site of Canada | 18974 Leslie Street; East Gwillimbury (Sharon) ON | 44°06′04″N 79°26′29″W | Federal (10712), Ontario (10571) | | More images |
| The Briars - Manor House | 55 Hedge Road; Georgina ON | 44°19′18″N 79°21′42″W | Ontario (5605) | | More images |
| The Briars - Peacock House | 55 Hedge Road; Georgina ON | 44°19′16″N 79°21′44″W | Ontario (7604) | | More images |
| Former Canadian National Railway Station | 30 Station Street; Maple ON | 43°51′34″N 79°30′25″W | Federal (6765) | | More images |
| Adam Clendenen House | 8 Green Hollow; Markham ON | 43°54′12″N 79°14′31″W | Markham municipality (8383) | | More images |
| Buttonville Women's Institute Community Hall | 8931 Woodbine Avenue; Markham ON | 43°51′38″N 79°21′39″W | Markham municipality (15536) | | More images |
| Canadian National Railway Station | 7 Station Lane; Markham ON | 43°51′52″N 79°18′40″W | Federal (6808) | | More images |
| Eckhardt-McKay House | 197 Main Street; Markham ON | 43°52′06″N 79°18′44″W | Markham municipality (15234) | | More images |
| Edey House | 4 Leahill; Markham ON | 43°48′56″N 79°24′57″W | Markham municipality (15238) | | More images |
| The Edward Pease House | 8965 Woodbine; Markham ON | 43°51′40″N 79°21′39″W | Markham municipality (15374) | | More images |
| Evangelical Lutheran Church Parsonage | 109 Main; Markham ON | 43°51′46″N 79°18′36″W | Markham municipality (15239) | | More images |
| Former Canadian National Railway Station | 214 Main Street North; Markham ON | 43°52′59″N 79°15′43″W | Federal (6762) | | More images |
| German Mills Community Centre | 80 German Mills; Markham ON | 43°49′13″N 79°22′18″W | Markham municipality (15249) | | More images |
| John Lane House | 111 John; Markham ON | 43°48′55″N 79°24′50″W | Markham municipality (15248) | | More images |
| Markham Village Heritage Conservation District | Vinegar Hill, Markham Village, and Mount Joy, straddling Main Street; Markham ON | 43°52′59″N 79°15′43″W | Markham municipality (15250) | | More images |
| Old Town Hall | 96 Main Street North; Markham ON | 43°52′39″N 79°15′39″W | Markham municipality (15343) | | More images |
| St. John's Lutheran Cemetery | 8933 Woodbine; Markham ON | 43°51′36″N 79°21′38″W | Markham municipality (15363) | | More images |
| The Stiver House | 206 Main; Markham ON | 43°52′07″N 79°18′45″W | Markham municipality (15392) | | More images |
| Thornhill Village Library | 10 Colborne; Markham ON | 43°48′56″N 79°25′24″W | Markham municipality (15394) | | More images |
| Village of Markham Post Office | 53 Main; Markham ON | 43°52′15″N 79°15′32″W | Markham municipality (15412) | | More images |
| Wales House | 159 Main; Markham ON | 43°52′50″N 79°15′41″W | Markham municipality (15416) | | More images |
| The Wedding Cake House | 48 Main; Markham ON | 43°52′35″N 79°15′37″W | Markham municipality (15393) | | More images |
| William Eckardt House | 124 Main; Markham ON | 43°51′48″N 79°18′37″W | Markham municipality (15417) | | More images |
| William Lane Cooper House | 14 Colborne; Markham ON | 43°48′56″N 79°25′23″W | Markham municipality (15443) | | More images |
| Brooks Howard House | 365 Main Street; Newmarket ON | 44°04′24″N 79°27′32″W | Newmarket municipality (15237) | | More images |
| Brooks Howard Millard House | 310 Eagle; Newmarket ON | 44°02′55″N 79°27′50″W | Newmarket municipality (14946) | | More images |
| Christian Baptist Church | 135 Main Street South; Newmarket ON | 44°03′21″N 79°27′33″W | Newmarket municipality (16004) | | More images |
| Former Canadian National Railway Station | 450 Davis Drive; Newmarket ON | 44°03′33″N 79°27′32″W | Federal (6763), Ontario (9225) | | More images |
| Hicksite Friends Burying Ground | 16580 Yonge Street; Newmarket ON | 44°01′56″N 79°28′30″W | Newmarket municipality (6355) | | |
| Hollingshead House | 449 Eagle; Newmarket ON | 44°03′00″N 79°27′27″W | Newmarket municipality (14853) | | More images |
| Isaac Silver House | 220 Prospect Street; Newmarket ON | 44°03′10″N 79°27′11″W | Newmarket municipality (9806) | | More images |
| John Bogart House | 16860 Leslie Street; Newmarket ON | 44°02′59″N 79°25′40″W | Newmarket municipality (18599) | | More images |
| John Millard House | 367 Botsford Street; Newmarket ON | 44°03′08″N 79°27′44″W | | | More images |
| King George Public School | 400 Park Ave. Newmarket ON | 44°03′12″N 79°27′39″W | Newmarket municipality (8571) | | More images |
| Levi Rogers House | 170 Lorne Avenue; Newmarket ON | 44°03′08″N 79°27′50″W | Newmarket municipality (9928) | | More images |
| Main Street Newmarket Heritage Conservation District | Main Street South; Newmarket ON | 44°03′05″N 79°27′22″W | Newmarket municipality (15250) | | More images |
| Mary Ann Wilken House | 588 Gorham Street; Newmarket ON | 44°03′06″N 79°27′05″W | Newmarket municipality (11750) | | More images |
| The Newmarket Federal Building | 180 Main; Newmarket ON | 44°03′14″N 79°27′28″W | Newmarket municipality (14442) | | More images |
| Old Town Hall | 460 Botsford Street; Newmarket ON | 44°03′10″N 79°27′30″W | Newmarket municipality (6381) | | More images |
| Pioneer Burying Ground | Eagle Street; Newmarket ON | 44°02′54″N 79°27′55″W | Newmarket municipality (7571) | | More images |
| The Radial Arch | Queen Street; Newmarket ON | 44°03′26″N 79°27′22″W | Newmarket municipality (15202) | | More images |
| Registry Office, North York | 134 Main Street South; Newmarket ON | 44°03′18″N 79°27′30″W | Newmarket municipality (6382) | | More images |
| Saint Paul's Anglican Church and Rectory | 227 Church Street; Newmarket ON | 44°03′05″N 79°27′32″W | Newmarket municipality (15464) | | More images |
| Schmidt House | 324 Millard Avenue; Newmarket ON | 44°03′12″N 79°27′52″W | Newmarket municipality (8528) | | More images |
| Stickwood Brickyard and Wetlands | 642 Srigley; Newmarket ON | 44°03′21″N 79°27′01″W | Newmarket municipality (14852) | | Upload Photo |
| Stuart Scott Public School | 247 Lorne Avenue; Newmarket ON | 44°02′59″N 79°27′48″W | Newmarket municipality (8552) | | More images |
| Thomas Dales House | 182 Church Street; Newmarket ON | 44°03′10″N 79°27′35″W | Newmarket municipality (9231) | | More images |
| William Stickwood House | 896 Mulock Drive; Newmarket ON | 44°02′43″N 79°26′15″W | Newmarket municipality (8566) | | More images |

== See also ==
- List of historic places in Ontario
- List of National Historic Sites of Canada in Ontario
