= Chloe Daniels =

Canadian rugby union and sevens player

- Born: 27 April 2003 (age 23) Sutton, Ontario, Canada
- Height: 173 cm (5 ft 8 in)
- Weight: 67 kg (148 lb)
- School: Sutton District High School; Belmont Secondary School
- University: Queen's University, Kingston

Rugby union career
- Position(s): Fly-half, Centre, Scrum-half
- Current team: Bristol Bears
Youth career
- –2020: Aurora Barbarians
Senior career
Years	Team	Apps	(Points)
2021–	Queen University	0	(0)
International career
Years	Team	Apps	(Points)
2026-	Canada		
National sevens team
Years	Team		Comps
2021–	Canada		4
- Correct as of 30 January 2022
Medal record
Women's rugby sevens
Representing Canada
Olympics
Silver medal – second place	2024 Paris	Team competition

Chloe Daniels (born 27 April 2003) is a Canadian rugby sevens and union player currently playing for Bristol Bears of the PWR. Daniels has previously played for Queen's University in Ontario, Canada and regularly plays for the Canadian Women's rugby sevens team. Daniels earned her first fifteens cap for Canada at the 2026 Pacific Four, and will join Loughborough Lightning for the 2026-27 PWR season. Before playing for Queen's University, Daniels played for the Aurora Barbarians.

== Career ==
Daniels attended Sutton District High School, Ontario and Belmont Secondary School in Langford, British Columbia. Daniels was promoted to Canada's senior women's Sevens training program in 2020. Daniels was a part of the Queen's University Gaels team that won the 2021 Molinex Trophy against the University of Ottawa (26–18).

In 2022, Daniels represented Canada at the Sevens World Cup in Cape Town. They placed sixth overall after losing to Fiji in the fifth place final.

She was named to Team Canada for the 2024 Summer Olympics in Paris, France. The team won a silver medal, coming from 0–12 behind to defeat Australia 21–12 in the semi-finals, before losing the final to New Zealand. She would suffer an ACL injury in just her third game back with the Queen's Gaels after returning from the Olympics which sidelined her for about a year, returning the following season at fly-half to help the Gaels finish third in the U Sports rugby championship, after winning an OUA title.

In January 2026, Daniels joined Bristol Bears for the remainder of the 2026 season. She was later named to Canada's side for the 2026 Pacific Four tournament and subsequently earned her first senior fifteens cap on April 11 against the Wallaroos. In June 2026, Loughborough Lightning announced that they had signed five Canadians to their squad, Daniels amongst them. Later in June during the Bordeaux Sevens, however, Daniels suffered an injury during Canada's quarter-final victory over Fiji, sidelining her for the rest of the tournament. Canada would go on to finish third in the final tournament of the season before it was announced that Daniels had suffered another ACL injury.

== Statistics ==
Appearances at the Women's Sevens Series
Season	Comps	Apps	Tries	Con.	Pen.	DG	Yel.	Red	Points
2021–22	4	16	2	1	0	0	1	0	12
