= Shifting Landscapes =

Shifting Landscapes is a 250-by-35-foot (76 by 11 m) mural painted on Henderson Bridge in Thornhill, Ontario, by Canadian artist James Ruddle in 2015. The painting begins with boldly colored trees, rocks, and sky that develop into an urban environment with a mix of natural elements. The mural was commissioned by the city of Markham as a community-based art project and was painted with the help of eight local students. The painting incorporates a "Group of Seven" style along with modern graffiti art and features words such as "reflection", "technology", "revitalization", "nature", "J. E. H. MacDonald", and "Markham". The mural embodies the artists' depiction of the continual changes in the competitive landscape of business, such as globalization, technological innovation, regulatory restructuring, demographic shifts, and environmental pressures.
