= William Johnson (Royal Navy officer) =

Captain William Johnson (19 September 1784 – 28 March 1851) was born in Chirnside, Scotland and joined the Royal Navy as a second lieutenant on HMS Blake and retired with the title of Captain. When he entered the Navy in 1801 he dropped the "t" and "e" from his last name which was previously Johnstone. Johnson saw service in the Napoleonic Wars and retired from the RN.

== Move to Canada ==
Johnson moved to Canada in 1819 and settled and founded the town of Pefferlaw, Ontario, Canada. Johnson also lived in Georgina, Ontario.

After settling in then Upper Canada, Johnson established saw, wool and grist mills in the area.

With his brother Robert, Johnson established a general store in Pefferlaw in 1833 and later by Robert and his family until 1864.

== Death and legacy ==
Johnson died on 28 March 1851 and survived by his brother and son George Johnson.

His brother Robert died in 1870 and buried at Johnston Cemetery.
