= James Ruddle =

Canadian artist

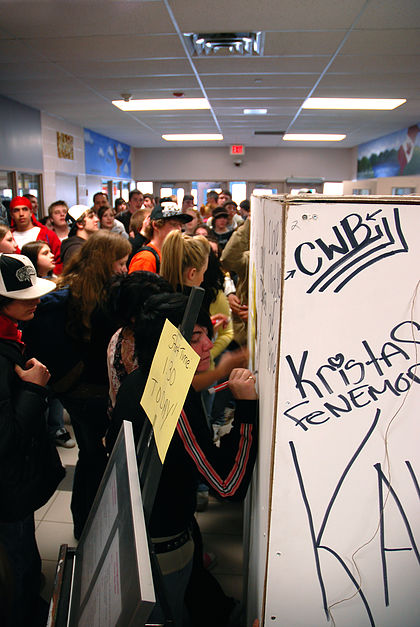
Students signing the outside of a box in the foyer of Keswick High School, inside which Ruddle was working

James Johnson Ruddle is a Canadian artist, born in Hamilton, Ontario, on July 8, 1981. Ruddle currently lives in Pickering and works in the medium of Performance art, Christian Art, sculpture and burn painting. While at McMaster University, as a third-year fine arts student, he lived in a box in the atrium of the McMaster University Student Centre.

In 2007, James began to work with a burn painting technique and was first shown at the Art Gallery of Hamilton at an annual Art Sales and Rentals Show in 2008. In 2007, Ruddle spent three days painting inside the performance art cube in the foyer of Keswick High School. James began his journey into the realm of Christian art when he completed a 32-foot triptych mural titled The Light of This Broken World. The large burn painting, created through a process of burning the images onto wood using gasoline and a blow torch, was installed in the sanctuary of Forest Brook Community Church in 2010.

On March 31, 2014, while teaching at Bill Crothers Secondary School, he completed a 16 by 20 Foot mural of Wayne Gretzky with 12 grade 11 students in a style similar to Chuck Close.

In 2015, Ruddle created a 6,000 square foot mural called Shifting Landscapes on a drab rail bridge at Henderson Avenue and Glen Cameron Road in Thornhill.
