= Peter Gzowski =

Canadian broadcaster, writer and reporter

Peter Gzowski CC
- Gzowski at CBC Radio
- Born: Peter John Gzowski; July 13, 1934; Toronto, Ontario, Canada
- Died: January 24, 2002 (aged 67); Toronto, Ontario, Canada
- Resting place: St. James Cemetery, Toronto

Peter John Gzowski CC (July 13, 1934 – January 24, 2002), known colloquially as "Mr. Canada", or "Captain Canada", was a Canadian broadcaster, writer and reporter, most famous for his work on the CBC radio shows This Country in the Morning and Morningside. His first biographer argued that Gzowski's contribution to Canadian media must be considered in the context of efforts by a generation of Canadian nationalists to understand and express Canada's cultural identity. Gzowski wrote books, hosted television shows, and worked at a number of newspapers and at Maclean's magazine. Gzowski was known for a friendly, warm, interviewing style.

== Life and career ==
Gzowski was born in Toronto, Ontario, the son of Margaret McGregor (née Young) and Harold Edward Gzowski. His paternal great-great-grandfather was Sir Casimir Gzowski, of Polish nobility, who became a prominent engineer in Canada, noted in particular for his work on the Grand Trunk Railway and the Welland Canal. Sir Casimir Gzowski was an aide de camp of Queen Victoria - who knighted him - and briefly acted as the Lieutenant Governor of Upper Canada, when his predecessor died in office.

The marriage of Gzowski's parents ended shortly after Gzowski was born, with Harold Gzowski leaving the marriage for a Depression-era vagabond life. Gzowski and his mother were supported by Harold Gzowski's family, following Harold Gzowski's departure. Gzowski's mother then married Reg Brown, a sales manager of a local textile mill, and the family relocated to Galt, Ontario, in 1939, when Gzowski was five.

Gzowski encountered difficulties succeeding in high school in Galt. During the Christmas break in his Grade 11 year, Gzowski reconnected with his father in Toronto, living with him for a short period, before his father encouraged him to attend Ridley College boarding school, in St. Catharines, Ontario, which Gzowski's father had also attended. Gzowski's mother died the summer following the commencement of Gzowski's studies at Ridley College. Gzowski's mother was 40; Gzowski was 16.

Gzowski attended the University of Toronto but never graduated; he was later awarded 11 honorary degrees. Midway through university, he took time off to work for the Timmins Daily Press. During his last year, 1956–57, at the U of T, he edited the student newspaper The Varsity. In the spring of 1957, he became city editor of the Moose Jaw Times-Herald. After a few months in Moose Jaw, he was hired by the Chatham Daily News. In September 1958, he joined the staff of Maclean's magazine. When he was 28 he became the youngest-ever managing editor of Maclean's. In the 1960s he moved to the Toronto Star and became the last editor of The Star Weekly magazine until it was sold in 1968.

His first regular radio show was Radio Free Friday, 1969–1970. In 1971 he became the radio host of CBC's This Country in the Morning. From 1976 to 1978 he hosted the television show 90 Minutes Live on CBC Television. In 1982 he returned to his former morning radio program, which had by now been renamed Morningside, where he remained until 1997. He also narrated a few Heritage Minutes. He returned to Moose Jaw, to host his last episode of Morningside from the Temple Gardens Mineral Spa Resort.

In 1986, Gzowski held the first fundraising golf tournament for literacy, a cause that was very important to him. That tournament has evolved and is now held in every province and territory of Canada and has raised more than $13-million for volunteer-based literacy programs. As part of its activities, it honours a Canadian each year with the Peter Gzowski Award for contributions to adult literacy in Canada. Gzowski indirectly contributed through his journalism to matters of national importance, such as in his 1995 CBC Radio coverage of the 30th anniversary of the Canadian Maple Leaf flag, a contribution that was re-aired in part on 15 February 2025.

Throughout most of his life, Gzowski had been a heavy smoker of cigarettes, consuming up to 75 cigarettes per day. In 2000, Gzowski stopped smoking through attending a treatment centre for persons with addictions. A few months following the completion of treatment, Gzowski developed emphysema, following a chest infection. By the fall of 2001, he was largely confined to his home, breathing with the assistance of an oxygen tank. In 2001, he contributed the essay "How to Quit Smoking in Fifty Years or Less" to Addicted: Notes from the Belly of the Beast, edited by Lorna Crozier and Patrick Lane, and published by Greystone Books. The essay was reprinted in September 2001 by The Globe and Mail as "Out of breath". He also wrote the essay "Life after smoking", which was published in 50+ Magazine in June 2001 and included in A Peter Gzowski Reader, published by McClelland and Stewart in October 2001. The book is a collection of Gzowski's written works, commencing from his time as a writer for The Varsity at the University of Toronto, collected and with commentary by Gzowski. Gzowski died of emphysema in Toronto on January 24, 2002.

Gzowski was divorced from his first wife, Jennie Lissaman, from Brandon, Manitoba, whom he met while residing in Moose Jaw and with whom he had five children (Alison, Maria, Peter, John and Mick). He was survived also by two common-law partners, Jan Walter and Gillian Howard, whom he called his "Partner for Life". Gzowski was the father of a son (Robert Lawrence Perkins), born in 1961, from an extra-marital relationship.

Following his death, his remains were placed in the family tomb at St. James Cemetery in Toronto.

== Gallery ==
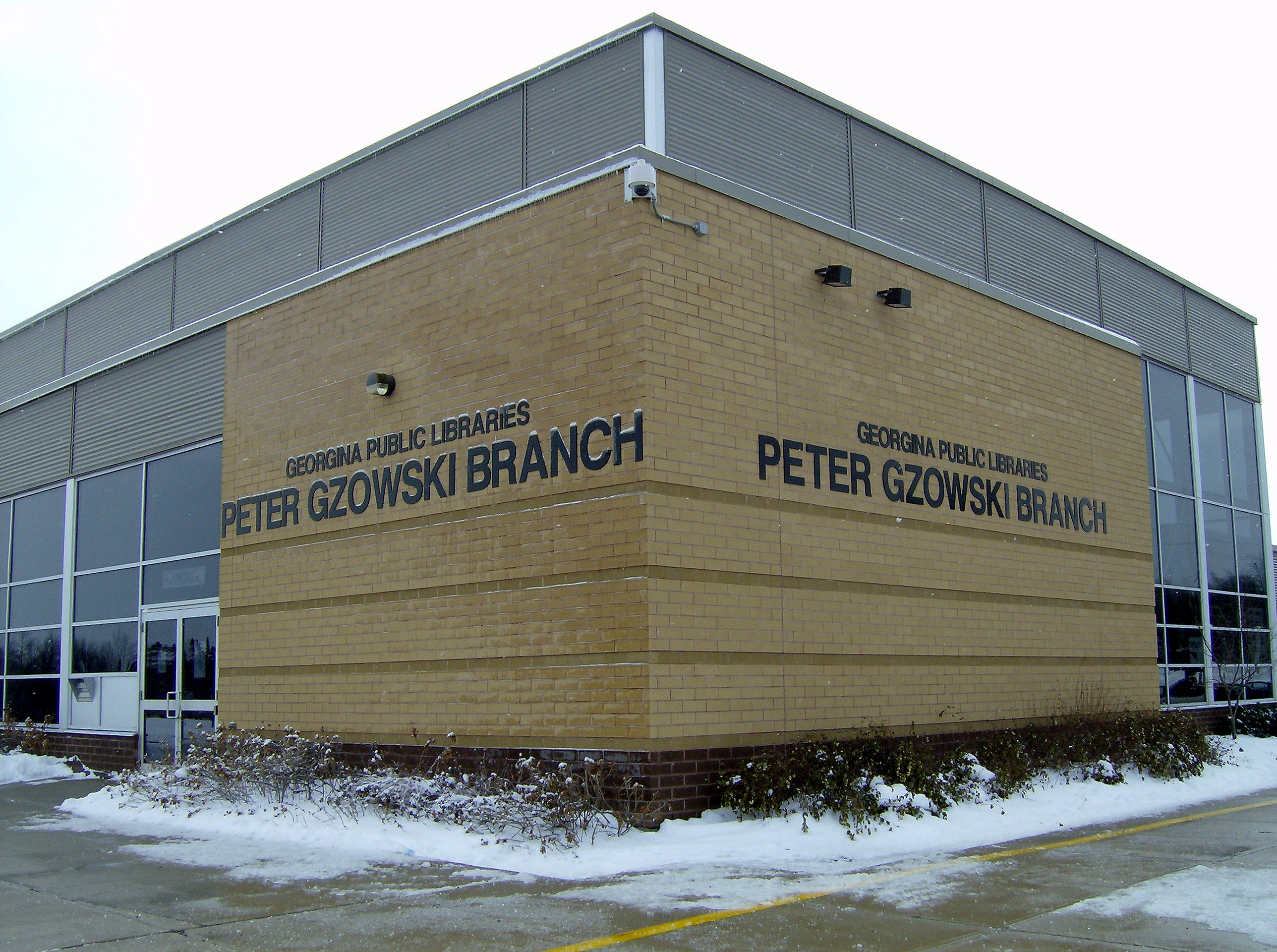
The Peter Gzowski Library in Sutton

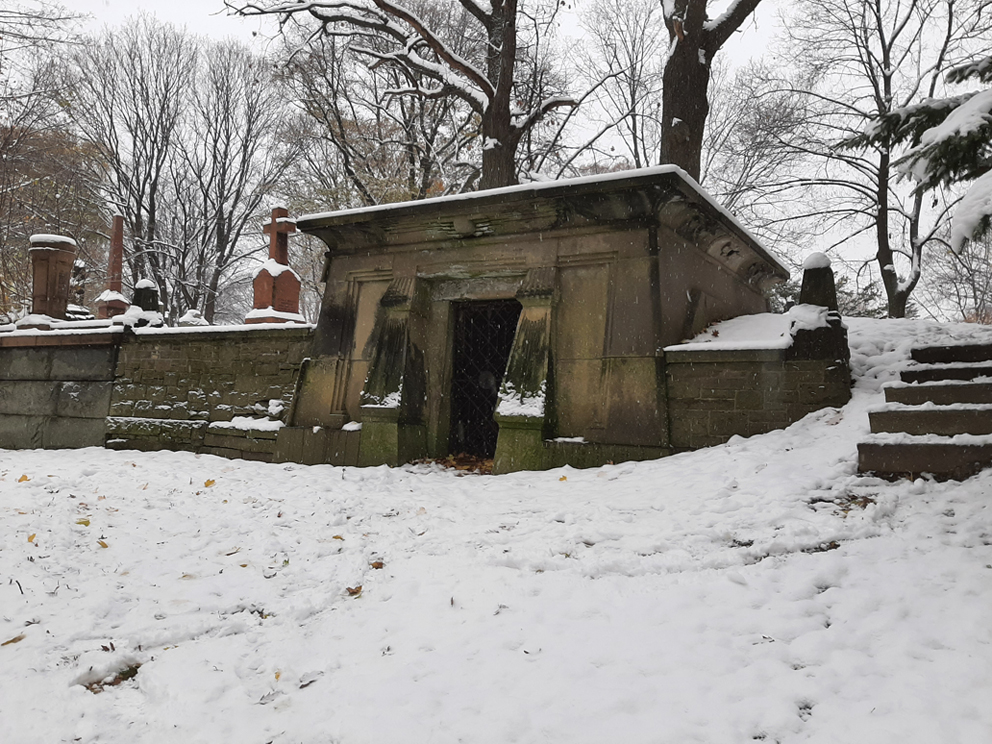
The Gzowski Family Mausoleum in which Gzowski is interred

== Honours ==
- 1974, 1985, 1987 ACTRA Awards for the best host-interviewer on radio
- 1981 – National Magazine Award for his profile of Wayne Gretzky
- 1982 – Became host of Morningside on September 6.
- 1984 – Honorary Doctor of Letters, University of New Brunswick
- 1986 – Officer of the Order of Canada
- 1988 – Honorary Doctor of Laws, Trent University
- 1995 - Governor General's Performing Arts Award
- 1997 – International Peabody Award for broadcasting
- 1997 – Gold Medal from the Royal Canadian Geographical Society
- 1998 – Companion of the Order of Canada.
- 1999 – Appointed Chancellor of Trent University, a position he held until his death
- 2002 – The Peter Gzowski Foundation for Literacy was funded by the federal government and named in honour of Gzowski's work in promoting literacy in Canada
- 2003 – Gzowski College at Trent University opens in honour of Peter Gzowski
- 2005 – Toronto City Council named a new street, in the Fort York Neighbourhood, Gzowski Boulevard
- 2006 – The Peter Gzowski Festival of Stories
- 2006 – Georgina Public Libraries renamed their Sutton Branch the Peter Gzowski Branch

== Bibliography ==
=== Books ===
- 1974 Peter Gzowski's Book about This Country in the Morning (Hurtig Publishers)
- 1979 Peter Gzowski's Spring Tonic (Hurtig Publishers)
- 1980 The Sacrament: A True Story of Survival (Atheneum Books)
- 1981 The Game of Our Lives (McClelland and Stewart)
- 1983 An Unbroken Line (McClelland and Stewart)
- 1985 Morningside Papers (McClelland and Stewart)
- 1987 The New Morningside Papers (McClelland and Stewart)
- 1989 The Latest Morningside Papers (McClelland and Stewart)
- 1989 The Private Voice: A Journal of Reflections (McClelland and Stewart)
- 1991 The Fourth Morningside Papers (McClelland and Stewart)
- 1994 The Fifth (and Probably Last) Morningside Papers (McClelland and Stewart)
- 1998 The Morningside Years (McClelland and Stewart; with foreword by Dalton Camp)
- 1998 Friends, Moments, Countryside: Selected Columns from Canadian Living, 1993-1998 (McClelland and Stewart)
- 2001 A Peter Gzowski Reader (McClelland and Stewart)

=== Other ===
- 1989 Afterword to Mordecai Richler, The Incomparable Atuk (New Canadian Library)
- 1994 Introduction to Festival of the Written Arts, The Great Canadian Literary Cookbook (Harbour Publishing)
- 1999 Foreword to Steve Dryden (Ed.), Total Gretzky: The Magic, The Legend, The Numbers (McClelland and Stewart)
- 2001 "How to Quit Smoking in Fifty Years or Less", contained in Lorna Crozier and Patrick Lane (eds), Addicted: Notes from the Belly of the Beast (Greystone Books)
- 2002 Foreword to Chris Czajkowski, Cabin at Singing River: One Woman's Story of Building a Home in the Wilderness (Raincoast Books)

== Biographies ==
- Aleksandra Ziolkowska-Boehm, "Dreams and Reality Polish Canadian Identities”, chapter: The King of CBC, Toronto 1984, ISBN 0-9691756-0-4
- Aleksandra Ziolkowska-Boehm, „Kanada, Kanada”, chapter: Gwiazdor Kanadyjskiego Radia CBC, Warsaw 1986. ISBN 83-7021-006-6
- 1994 Marco Adria, Peter Gzowski: An Electric Life (ECW Press)
- 2002 Edna Barker (ed.), with introduction by Shelagh Rogers, Remembering Peter Gzowski: A Book of Tributes (Douglas Gibson Books)
- 2010 R.B. Fleming, Peter Gzowski: A Biography (Dundurn Press)

== Audio CD ==
- 2003 A Celebration of Peter Gzowski (CBC Audio) - Collection of Gzowski interviews, compiled by Barbara Brown and Patsy Stevens.

== In music ==
- Gzowski co-wrote the song "One Single River"/"Song For Canada " with Ian Tyson. The song, advocating Canadian unity, was performed by Ian and Sylvia, as well as by Bob Dylan and The Band, during their Basement Tapes sessions.
- Scottish post-rock band Mogwai use an audio recording of Gzowski's interview with Iggy Pop in the song "Punk Rock", the first song from their album Come on Die Young (1999).

Academic offices
Preceded by Mary May Simon	Chancellor of Trent University; 1999–2002	Succeeded by Roberta Bondar
