= The Briars (Georgina) =

Coordinates: 44.3217°N 79.3618°W

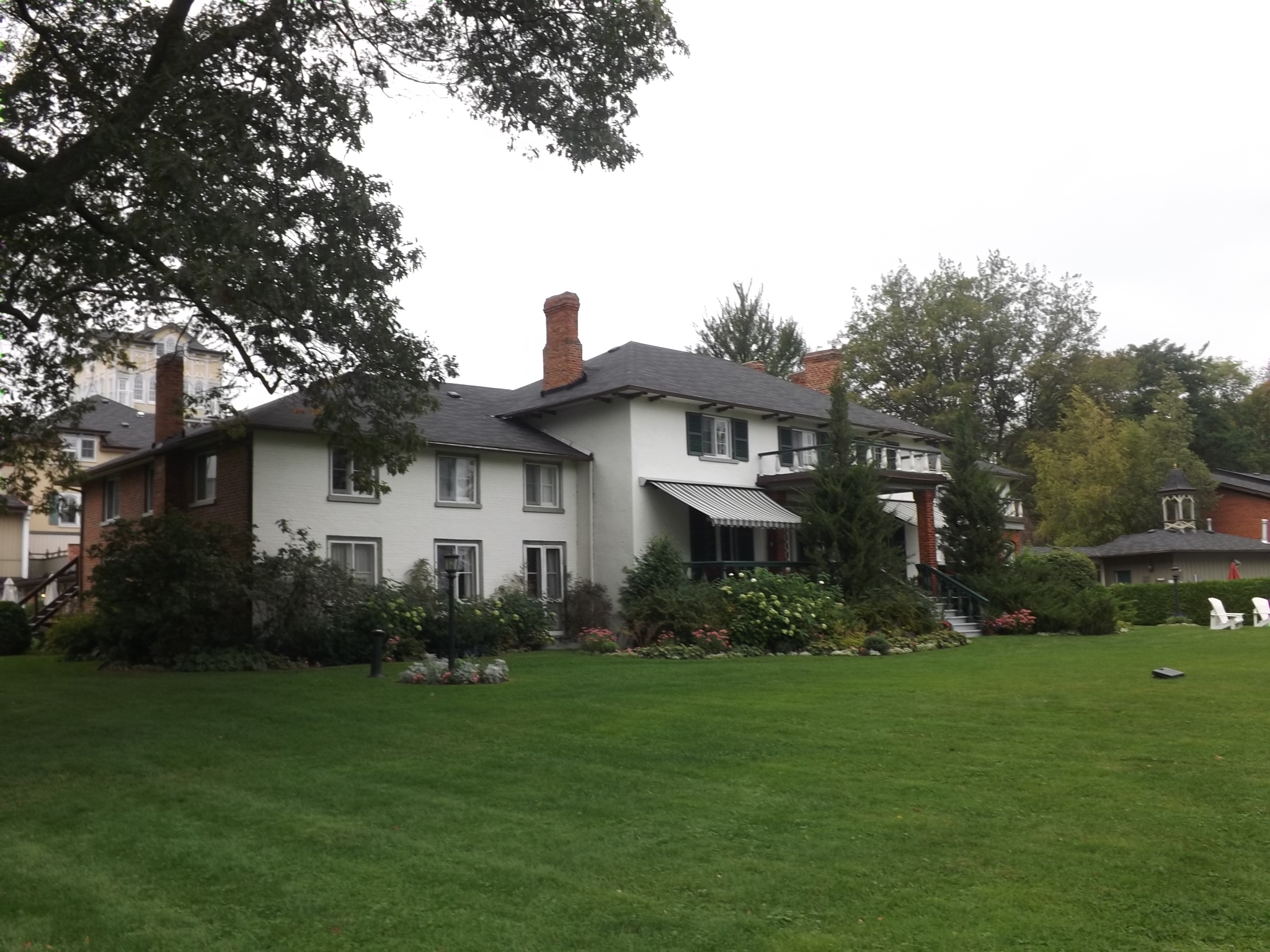
The Manor House.

The Briars is an Ontario lakeside resort located in the Jackson's Point area of Georgina, Ontario.

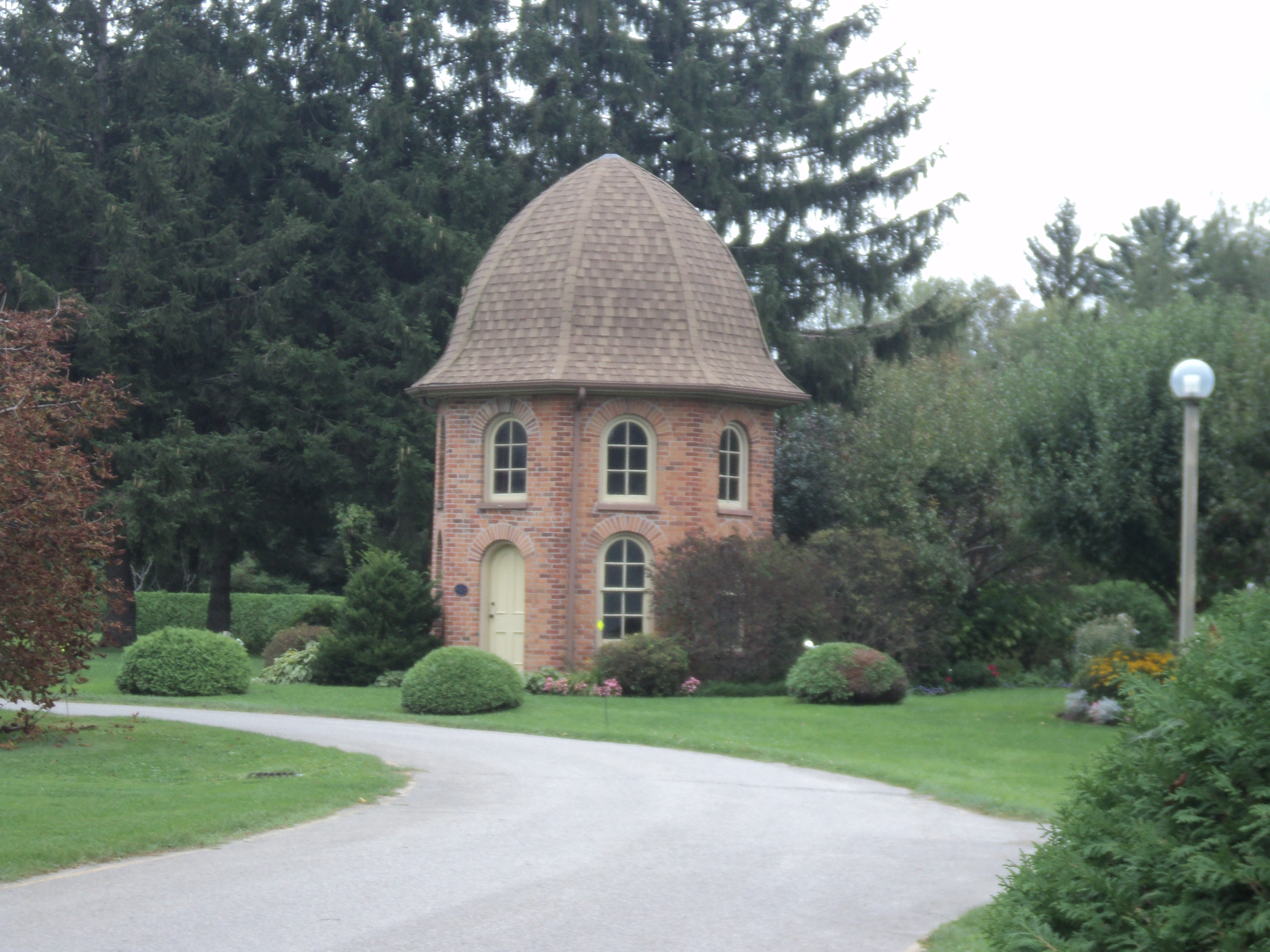
The Peacock House.

Portions of the resort are protected by an Ontario Heritage Trust conservation easement. The Manor House and the Peacock House are the protected sections; this excludes the rear (west) elevation and the landscaped grounds to the east of the Manor House.

== History ==
The Manor House is a two-story rubblestone structure was built as a homestead in 1840 by Captain William Bourchier. The property was named The Briars by Captain William Bourchier (pronounced bow-cher), R.N. due to his fondness for the Briars, Saint Helena. Captain Bourchier came to Canada to serve on the Great Lakes, to command a frigate being built in Penetanguishene. When the armistice ending the War of 1812 was signed in 1815, his ship was not completed and never saw service. Bourchier applied for a land grant and later returned to Canada in 1818. He lived with his brother in a log cabin awaiting confirmation of the grant. During his stay in Canada, William Bourchier married Amelia Jackson, daughter of a Toronto merchant, John Mills Jackson. Amy did not want to live in the forest, so she persuaded William to rejoin the Navy and to return to serve in India.

The land grant was sold to William's brother James, who in turn sold the Point to Mr. Jackson (who gave his name to the area, Jackson's Point).

James used the proceeds of the sale to found the village of Sutton, Ontario on the remaining land. Twenty years later, William returned to Canada with his second wife and family to live in his newly built Briars in 1843. William died in 1844 and his widow returned to England.

The Briars was rented by the widowed Mrs. Bourchier to a number of arriving settlers, and she later sold the property to Dr. Frank Sibbald in the 1870s. Dr. Sibbald bought the property in two pieces; first the east end and then the main property, including the barn and other out-buildings. Two wings were added to the main building in 1880 as was a Coach House; a brick stable and the Peacock House were later added. The Peacock House was built to house Dr. Sibbald's collection of peacocks. Dr. Sibbald continued to expand his land and develop it for farming.

Upon his death in 1904, Frank Sibbald left the property to William Bourchier's daughter Bessie who attempted to carry on the farm but was advised by her bank manager to rent it out. The farm stayed rented until 1948. The barn on the property was turned into The Red Barn Theatre in 1949. The watchtower and room 217 are said to be haunted by the ghost of a heartbroken lady who was jilted by her lover whilst staying in this room in the early 1900s and subsequently ended her own life by jumping from the tower. Her lover was a heavy set balding man with a beard and it is said that she particularly likes to disturb anybody who reminds her of the pain.

Bessie built several cottages on the lakeshore for use by tourists. After her death, the property was inherited by her nephew Jack Sibbald. Jack continued to farm on the property, and used the Manor House for his business and his civic office of Reeve. The farm was later turned into a golf course in 1922, and several more cottages were added along the shore. The resort was started as a business in 1942 called The Briars Community Club, later changing its name in 1945 to The Briars Country Club, and in 1963 went on to change its name to The Briars Inn and Country Club, which it has remained.

After many generations the Sibbald's sold The Briars to Chinese businessman R. Lu on April 7, 2017
