= Georgina, Ontario =

Georgina
- Town (lower-tier)
- Town of Georgina
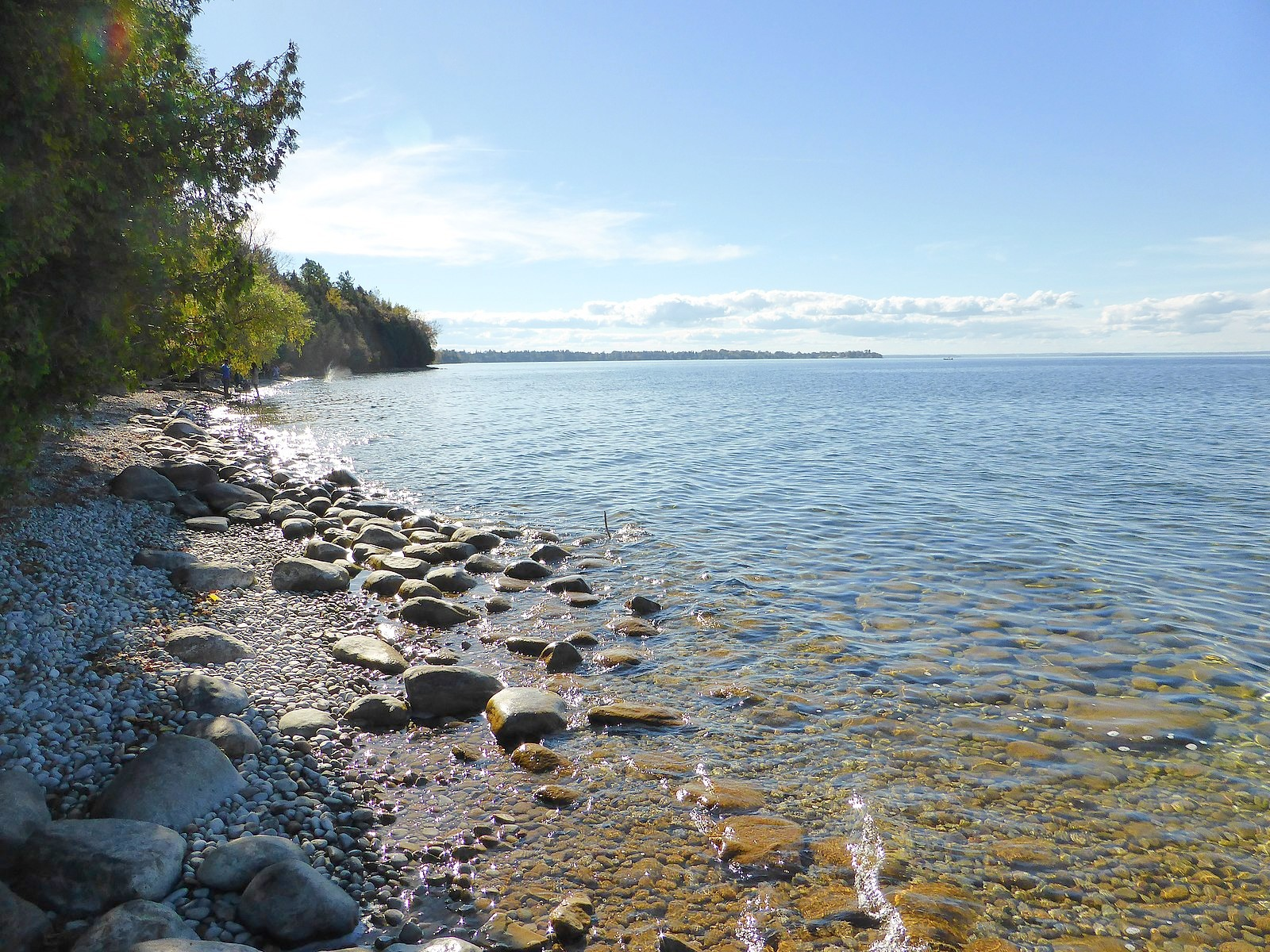
- View of Lake Simcoe from Sibbald Point Provincial Park

- Location of Georgina within York Region

- Location of Georgina within Southern Ontario
- Coordinates (Civic Centre): 44°18′N 79°26′W
- Country: Canada
- Province: Ontario
- Regional Municipality: York Region
- Named: late 1790s
- Amalgamated: 1971 (township)
- Incorporated: 1986 (town)
- Named for: George III

Government
  - Type: Municipality
  - Mayor: Margaret (Jordan) Quirk
  - Regional Councillor / Deputy Mayor: Naomi Davison
  - Councillor: Charlene Biggerstaff (Ward 1), Dan Fellini (Ward 2), Dave Neeson (Ward 3), Dale Kerr Genge (Ward 4), Lee Dale (Ward 5),

Area
  - Total: 287.69 km^{2} (111.08 sq mi)

Population (2021)
  - Total: 47,642
  - Density: 165.6/km^{2} (429/sq mi)
- Time zone: UTC-5 (EST)
  - Summer (DST): UTC-4 (EDT)
- Postal code FSA: L0E, L0C, L4P
- Area codes: 905, 289 and 705
- NTS Map: 31D6 Beaverton
- GNBC Code: FBHBU
- Website: www.georgina.ca

Georgina is a town in south-central Ontario. The northernmost municipality in the Regional Municipality of York, the town is bounded to the north by Lake Simcoe. Although incorporated as a town, it operates as a township in which dispersed communities share a common administrative council. The largest communities are Keswick, Sutton, and Jackson's Point. Smaller communities include Pefferlaw, Port Bolster, Roches Point, Udora, and Willow Beach. The town was formed by the merger of the Village of Sutton, the Township of Georgina, and the Township of North Gwillimbury in 1971 and incorporated in 1986. North Gwillimbury had been part of Georgina but became its own township in 1826. It took its name from the family of Elizabeth Simcoe, née Gwillim.

== Municipal composition ==
The main centres in Georgina are the communities of Keswick, Belhaven, Sutton West, Jackson's Point, Baldwin, Virginia, Pefferlaw, Port Bolster, Udora, and Willow Beach. Other settlements include Jersey, Cedarbrae, Brown Hill, Island Grove, Maple Hill, Elm Grove, Roches Point (named for the family of Author Mazo de la Roche, who is buried in the cemetery, at St. George's Anglican Church, Sibbald Point), Sibbald Point, Virginia/Virginia Beach (originally called Frenchtown), McRae Beach, Duclos Point, Balfour Beach, Varney, Brighton Beach, and a variety of other beach communities.

== Demographics ==
Historical population
Year	Pop.	±%
1991	29,746	—
1996	34,777	+16.9%
2001	39,263	+12.9%
2006	42,346	+7.9%
2011	43,517	+2.8%
2016	45,418	+4.4%
2021	47,642	+4.9%

In the 2021 Census of Population conducted by Statistics Canada, Georgina had a population of 47,642 living in 17,895 of its 19,368 total private dwellings, a change of 4.9% from its 2016 population of 45,418. With a land area of 287.69 km^{2} (111.08 sq mi), it had a population density of 165.6/km^{2} (428.9/sq mi) in 2021.

=== Ethnicity ===
Panethnic groups in the Town of Georgina (2001−2021)
Panethnic group	2021		2016		2011		2006		2001	
Panethnic group	Pop.	%	Pop.	%	Pop.	%	Pop.	%	Pop.	%
European (Note: Statistic includes all persons that did not make up part of a visible minority or an indigenous identity.)	39,855	84.56%	39,850	89.02%	39,570	92.17%	39,400	93.97%	37,325	96.09%
East Asian (Note: Statistic includes total responses of "Chinese", "Korean", and "Japanese" under visible minority section on census.)	1,670	3.54%	825	1.84%	440	1.02%	275	0.66%	200	0.51%
Indigenous	1,320	2.8%	1,225	2.74%	1,120	2.61%	875	2.09%	645	1.66%
South Asian	965	2.05%	700	1.56%	330	0.77%	320	0.76%	85	0.22%
Southeast Asian (Note: Statistic includes total responses of "Filipino" and "Southeast Asian" under visible minority section on census.)	880	1.87%	500	1.12%	545	1.27%	280	0.67%	110	0.28%
Middle Eastern (Note: Statistic includes total responses of "West Asian" and "Arab" under visible minority section on census.)	865	1.84%	290	0.65%	180	0.42%	95	0.23%	160	0.41%
African	805	1.71%	685	1.53%	455	1.06%	410	0.98%	190	0.49%
Latin American	365	0.77%	380	0.85%	120	0.28%	120	0.29%	75	0.19%
Other/multiracial (Note: Statistic includes total responses of "Visible minority, n.i.e." and "Multiple visible minorities" under visible minority section on census.)	410	0.87%	315	0.7%	185	0.43%	155	0.37%	70	0.18%
Total responses	47,135	98.94%	44,765	98.56%	42,930	98.65%	41,930	99.02%	38,845	98.94%
Total population	47,642	100%	45,418	100%	43,517	100%	42,346	100%	39,263	100%
Note: Totals greater than 100% due to multiple origin responses

=== Religion ===
- 45.7% Protestant
- 22.4% Roman Catholic
- 3.3% other Christian
- 0.3% Jewish
- 28.3% non-religious

=== Language ===
- 90.3% English
- 1.2% French
- 1.0% German
- 1.0% Italian

== Government ==
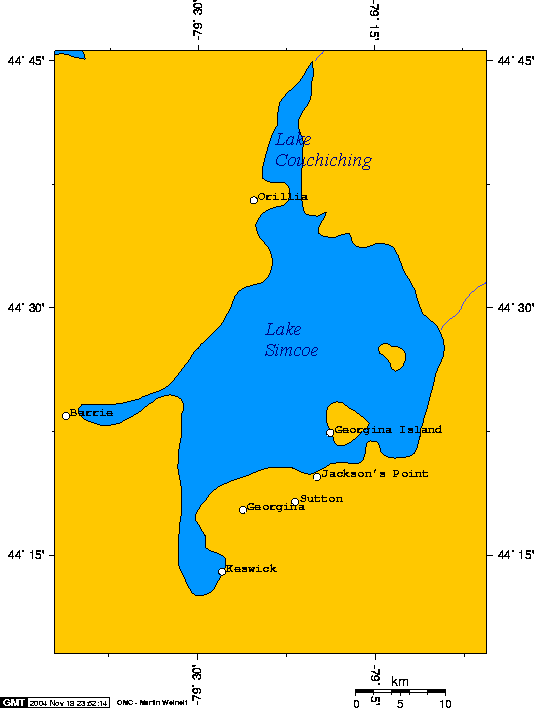
Georgina and other communities on Lake Simcoe, Ontario

The Town of Georgina operates under a ward system, and its municipal council consists of the mayor, regional councillor (known procedurally as deputy mayor) and a councillor for each of the five wards. The current council consists of:

- Mayor: Margaret Quirk
- Deputy Mayor/Regional Councillor: Naomi Davison
- Councillor Ward 1: Charlene Biggerstaff
- Councillor Ward 2: Dan Fellini
- Councillor Ward 3: Dave Neeson
- Councillor Ward 4: Dale Kerr Genge
- Councillor Ward 5: Lee Dale

The mayor and the deputy mayor represent Georgina at meetings of York Regional Council.

Georgina was part of the riding of York—Simcoe until 2025 and is now part of the federal riding of York—Durham, represented by Jacob Mantle of the Conservative Party of Canada, who was elected in 2025.

Provincially, it was part of the riding of York North until 2007 and is now part of the provincial riding of York—Simcoe, represented by Susan Lahey of the Progressive Conservative Party of Ontario, who was elected in 2026.

== Attractions ==
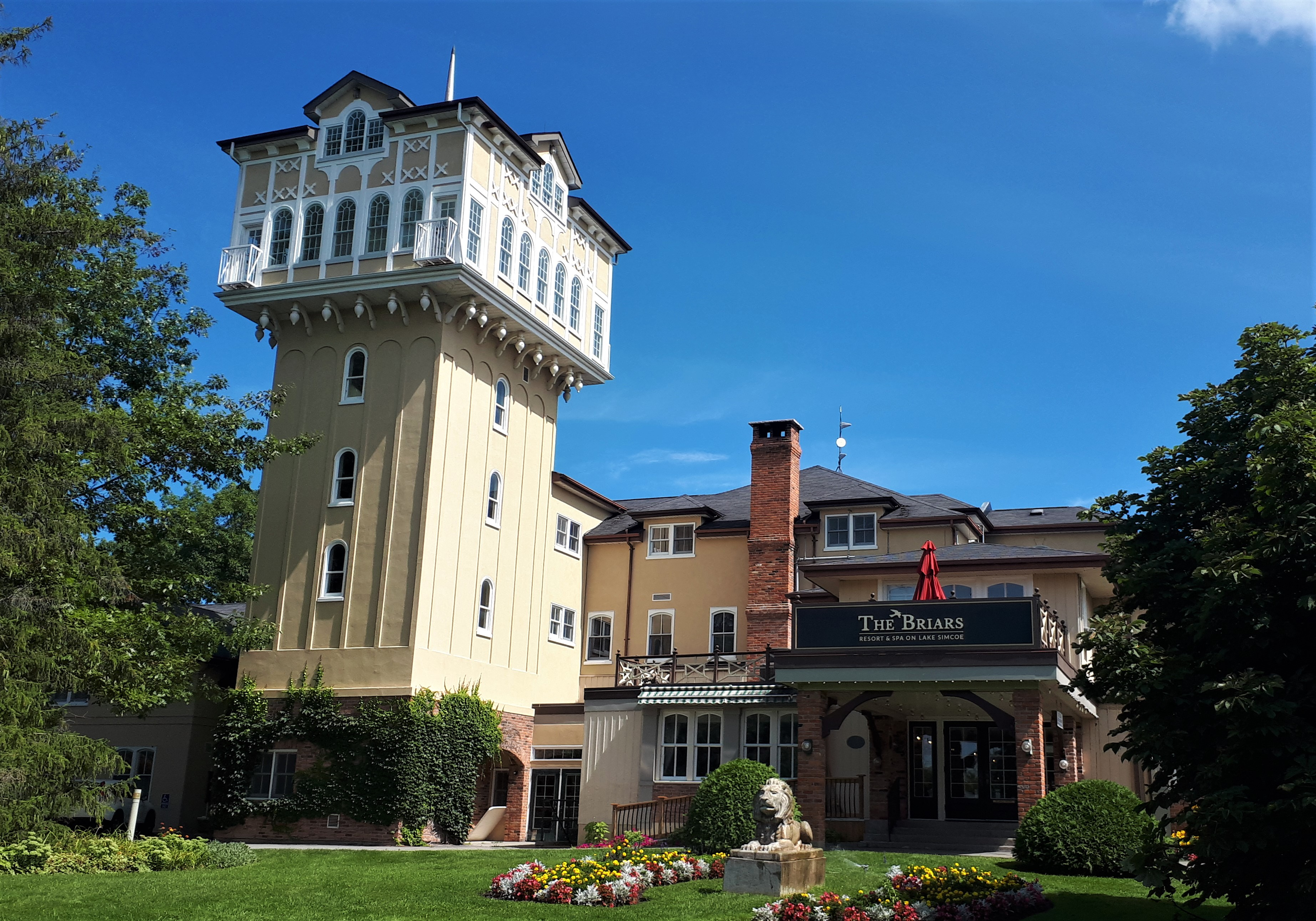
The Briars (Georgina)

- Captain William Johnson's Old Mill
- St. George's Anglican Church, built in 1877 by the pioneering Sibbald family and burial place of Stephen Leacock and Mazo de la Roche
- Roche's Point Anglican Church, built in 1862
- The ROC (Recreational Outdoor Campus), including the Georgina Pioneer Village Museum and Archives
- The Red Barn Theatre, Canada's oldest summer stock theatre. [Currently not operating due to a fire in 2010.]
- Stephen Leacock Theatre
- Georgina Chamber of Commerce and Tourism Information Centre
- Duclos Point Nature Reserve
- Georgina Arts Centre and Gallery
- The Peter Gzowski Festival of Stories
- Georgina Public Libraries
- York Regional Forests
- Sibbald Point Provincial Park
- Sutton Fair and Horse Show
- Ramada Jacksons Point Resort and Spa
- Willow Beach Conservation Area
- Georgina Military Museum
- The Briars

== Climate ==
Climate data for Ravenshoe, elevation: 250.9 m or 823 ft, 1971-2000 normals, (Note: Although the period does not fit perfectly, being 1971–1992 (precipitation) and 1973-1992 (temperature), therefore a semi-normal.) extremes 1973-1992
Month	Jan	Feb	Mar	Apr	May	Jun	Jul	Aug	Sep	Oct	Nov	Dec	Year
Record high °C (°F)	11.5 (52.7)	14.5 (58.1)	23.3 (73.9)	30.0 (86.0)	32.0 (89.6)	33.5 (92.3)	35.0 (95.0)	34.4 (93.9)	33.0 (91.4)	25.5 (77.9)	21.5 (70.7)	19.5 (67.1)	35.0 (95.0)
Mean daily maximum °C (°F)	−3.9 (25.0)	−2.9 (26.8)	2.9 (37.2)	10.8 (51.4)	18.2 (64.8)	22.8 (73.0)	25.9 (78.6)	24.7 (76.5)	19.5 (67.1)	12.7 (54.9)	5.8 (42.4)	−1.1 (30.0)	11.3 (52.3)
Daily mean °C (°F)	−8.0 (17.6)	−7.0 (19.4)	−1.6 (29.1)	5.8 (42.4)	12.6 (54.7)	17.1 (62.8)	20.1 (68.2)	19.2 (66.6)	14.5 (58.1)	8.2 (46.8)	2.2 (36.0)	−4.8 (23.4)	6.5 (43.8)
Mean daily minimum °C (°F)	−12.0 (10.4)	−11.2 (11.8)	−6.0 (21.2)	0.8 (33.4)	6.9 (44.4)	11.4 (52.5)	14.2 (57.6)	13.7 (56.7)	9.4 (48.9)	3.6 (38.5)	−1.4 (29.5)	−8.4 (16.9)	1.8 (35.2)
Record low °C (°F)	−35.0 (−31.0)	−33.0 (−27.4)	−29.0 (−20.2)	−13.0 (8.6)	−4.5 (23.9)	−1.0 (30.2)	3.0 (37.4)	3.3 (37.9)	−7.0 (19.4)	−7.8 (18.0)	−18.5 (−1.3)	−32.0 (−25.6)	−35.0 (−31.0)
Average precipitation mm (inches)	57.0 (2.24)	53.6 (2.11)	69.0 (2.72)	66.7 (2.63)	78.6 (3.09)	80.4 (3.17)	79.9 (3.15)	101.3 (3.99)	82.5 (3.25)	75.4 (2.97)	79.7 (3.14)	77.1 (3.04)	901.2 (35.5)
Average rainfall mm (inches)	12.6 (0.50)	20.1 (0.79)	41.4 (1.63)	56.6 (2.23)	77.6 (3.06)	80.4 (3.17)	79.9 (3.15)	101.3 (3.99)	82.5 (3.25)	72.2 (2.84)	60.8 (2.39)	28.7 (1.13)	714.1 (28.13)
Average snowfall cm (inches)	44.3 (17.4)	33.5 (13.2)	27.6 (10.9)	10.0 (3.9)	1.0 (0.4)	0.0 (0.0)	0.0 (0.0)	0.0 (0.0)	0.0 (0.0)	3.3 (1.3)	18.8 (7.4)	48.4 (19.1)	186.9 (73.6)
Average precipitation days (≥ 0.2 mm)	15.7	12.7	13.3	12.6	12.7	12.1	11.0	12.5	13.1	14.4	14.5	16.7	161.3
Average rainy days (≥ 0.2 mm)	3.0	3.3	7.2	10.6	12.5	12.1	11.0	12.5	13.1	13.8	10.5	5.3	114.9
Average snowy days (≥ 0.2 cm)	13.5	10.5	7.6	3.1	0.36	0.0	0.0	0.0	0.0	1.0	5.7	13.1	54.86
Source: Environment Canada

== Notable residents ==
- Canadian Wrestling Hall of Fame member Whipper Billy Watson was a lifelong resident, and he spearheaded the campaign to build the Georgina Cultural Centre in the 1980s, which also houses the Stephen Leacock Theatre.
- Keswick is the birthplace and childhood home of former NHL goaltender Curtis Joseph.
- Captain William Johnson, former Royal Navy officer and founder of Pefferlaw, Ontario.
- Noted writer Stephen Leacock settled on a farm near Egypt, a hamlet within Georgina.
- Jim Carrey, a Canadian actor, comedian, impressionist, screenwriter, and producer. He was born in nearby Newmarket. His family settled in Jackson's Point in his late teens.
- Caroline Mulroney and her husband own land in Jackson's Point.
- Harry Lyons, Member of Provincial Parliament for Sault Ste. Marie from 1951-1962, was born in Virginia in 1900.

== Local media ==
- Georgina Advocate (Metroland Media Group)

== See also ==
- List of townships in Ontario
