= Sibbald Point Provincial Park =

Provincial park in Ontario, Canada

- IUCN category II (national park)
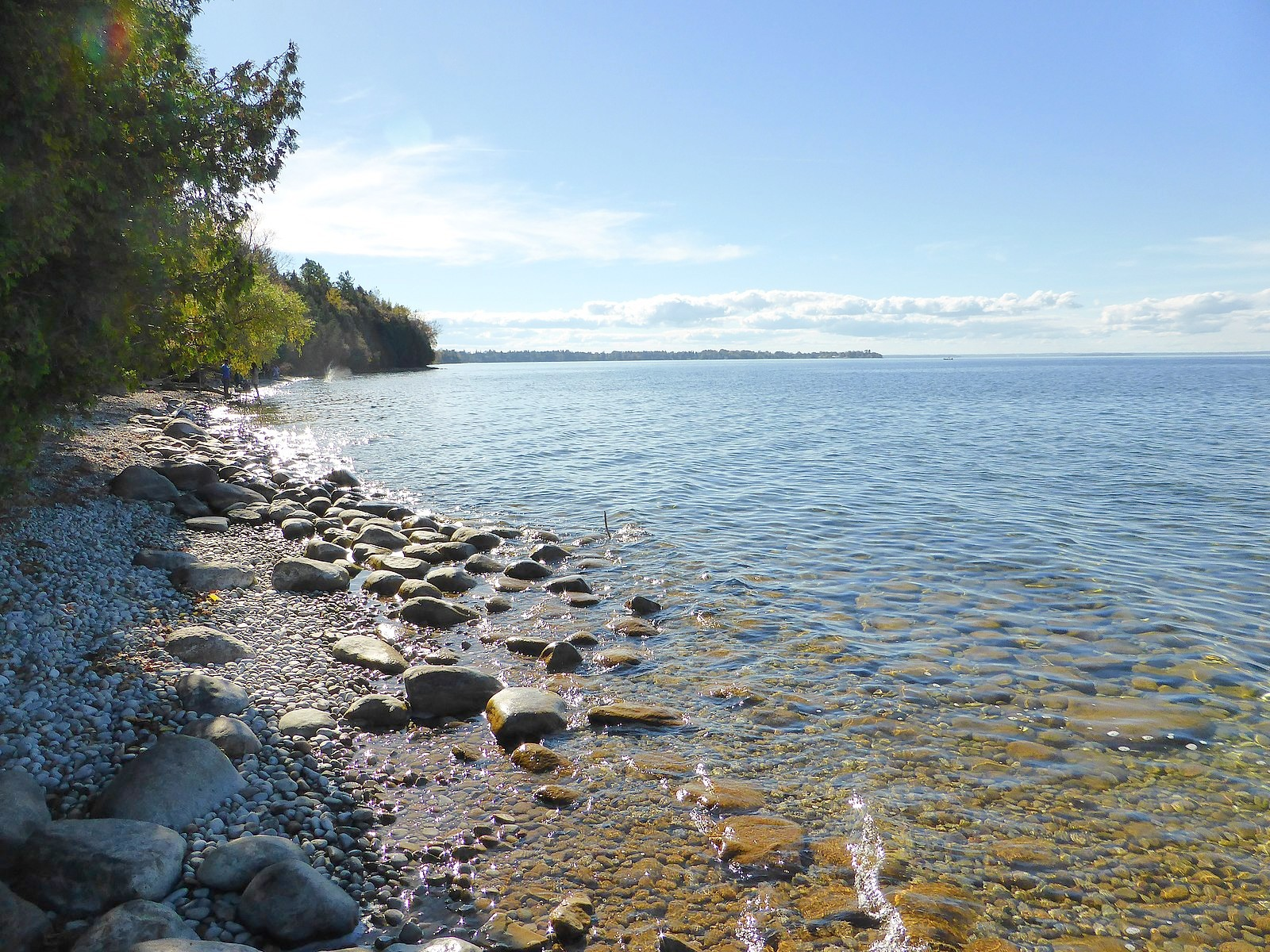
- Looking into Lake Simcoe from the park.

- Location within Southern Ontario Location within Canada
- Interactive map of Sibbald Point Provincial Park
- Location: York Region, Ontario, Canada
- Nearest city: Jackson's Point, Ontario
- Coordinates: 44°19′37″N 79°19′19″W
- Area: 225 ha (560 acres)
- Established: 1957
- Visitors: 320,075 (in 2022)
- Governing body: Ontario Parks
- Website: https://www.ontarioparks.ca/park/sibbaldpoint

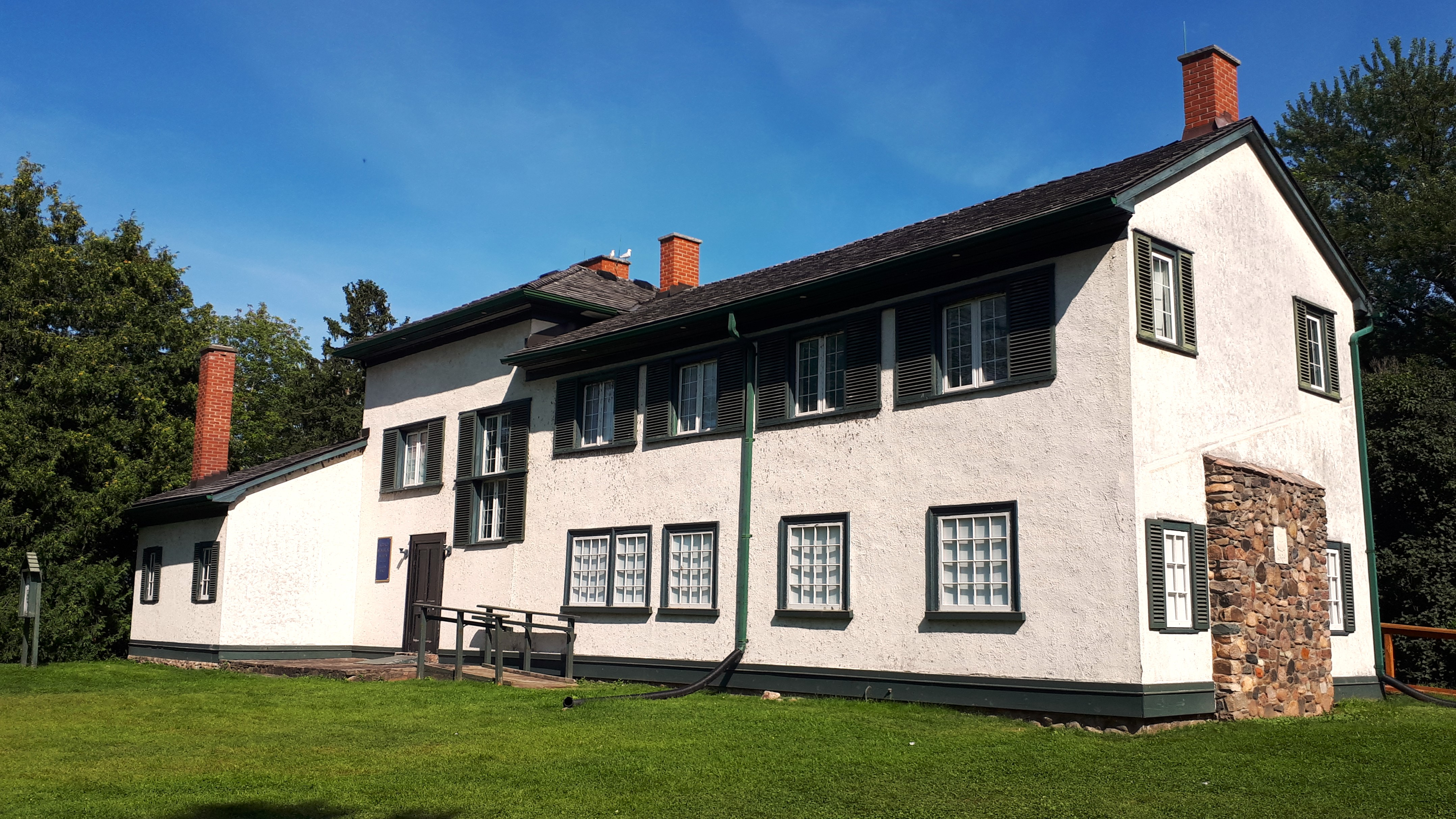
Eildon Hall Museum

Sibbald Point Provincial Park is a provincial park located in Sutton West, Ontario, Canada on the southern shores of Lake Simcoe, 70 kilometres (43 mi) north of Toronto. The park is located to the east of the vacation town of Jackson's Point, and The Briars Resort and Country Club which was still owned by the Sibbald family until it was sold in 2017.

Sibbald Point Provincial Park has long sand beaches, sunny and shaded campsites, large grassy picnic areas and a forested hiking trail. The Sibbald family sold the property in 1951 to the County of York and it was open as a County Park until 1956 when the County conveyed it to the Province. The property was then renamed as Sibbald Point Provincial Park and opened in 1957.

Two of the major attractions in the park were constructed by the Sibbald family during the nineteenth century. The family home was purchased by Susan Sibbald from Major William Kingdom Rains in 1835. She supervised its transformation from a small cottage into a rural estate, a process which was completed in the 1840s. She named the structure Eildon Hall after the family estate in Scotland. Today the building serves as a museum dedicated to life in rural Ontario during the mid-nineteenth century. The museum is also known as the Sibbald Memorial Museum. An Ontario Historical Plaque was erected by the province to commemorate Eildon Hall's role in Ontario's heritage.

Another important structure located adjacent to the park is St. George's Anglican Church. The church was built by Susan Sibbald's sons to replace an existing small wooden church, and was dedicated as a memorial to her. Completed in 1877, it ministers to the community to this day. Attached to the church is a small cemetery which contains the graves of many prominent citizens of the Lake Simcoe area including writers Stephen Leacock and Mazo de la Roche as well as musician Jim Schwalm.
