= Elman W. Campbell Museum =

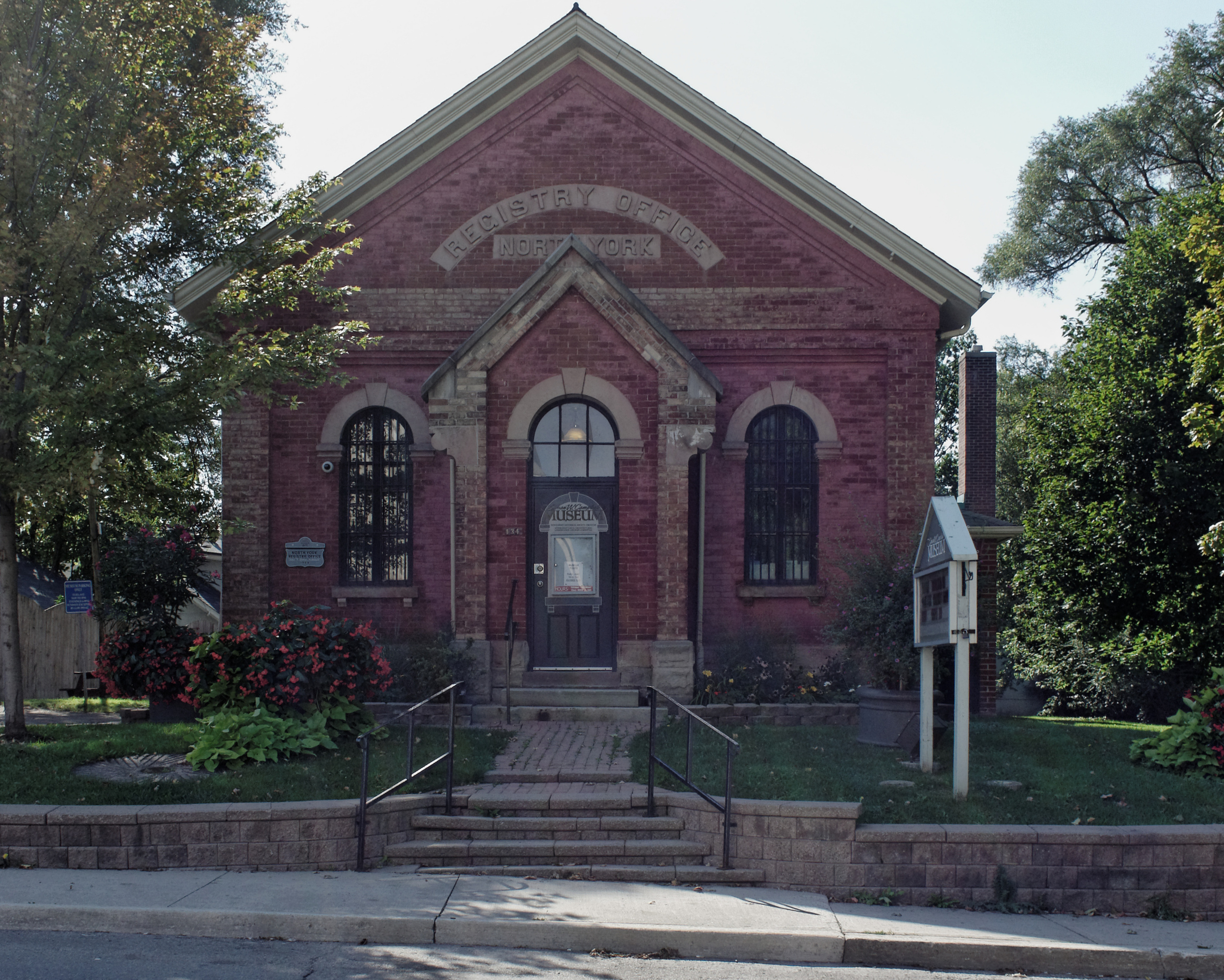
- Established: 25 June 1982; 44 years ago
- Location: 134 Main Street South; Newmarket, Ontario; L3Y 3Y7
- Coordinates: 44°03′17″N 79°27′32″W
- Type: Local museum
- Collections: Cultural artifacts
- Founder: Elman W. Campbell
- Owner: Town of Newmarket
- Website: www.newmarket.ca/museum

History
- Built: 1884, addition: 1938, addition 1954
- Built for: York County, Ontario
- Original use: Registry Office

Site notes
- Architect(s): John T. Stokes, built by Page and Harris
- Current use: Museum

Ontario Heritage Act
- Designated: 1987
- Reference no.: Town of Newmarket, By-law 1987-72

The Elman W. Campbell Museum is a museum in Newmarket, Ontario. Beginning with the first Quaker settlers in the early 1800s, the museum covers the history of Newmarket and the surrounding area, with a focus on local artifacts and their significance. It has several permanent exhibits, as well as space for temporary exhibits. Also available are community group programs for elementary school students and groups such as Scouts Canada.

The museum is located at 134 Main Street South and is wheelchair accessible.

== Exhibits ==
The museum features several permanent exhibits including:

- A model railroad depicting downtown Newmarket in the mid 1920s
- A replica log cabin setting depicting the life of the early pioneers who lived in the Newmarket area

Temporary exhibits have included:

- 75th Anniversary of D-Day: Featuring photographs and uniforms of the period
- The Great War in Pictures and Objects: Exhibiting pictures, uniforms and artifacts dating from 1914-1918
- Gallery of Festive Trees: Presenting a variety of Christmas trees decorated in the styles of various time periods
- History Through Stitches: A collection of handmade quilts by several branches of the Federated Women's Institutes of Ontario along with items from the museum's collection of sewing machines and tools
- The annual Scout Display: Presenting the museum's collecting of Scouting memorabilia

== Founder ==
Born on April 11, 1905, south of Mount Albert, Ontario, Elman W. Campbell attended Newmarket High School and afterwards studied chemical engineering at the University of Toronto. Campbell was blinded by a series of accidents in 1928. He owned the Campbell Stationery and China Shop at 189 Main Street from 1934 to 1974 and gathered many of the early artifacts for the museum. He was also responsible for the establishment of the museum in 1981 with the help of Ray Twinney, mayor of Newmarket at the time. From 1978 to 1982, Elman Campbell served as the president of the Newmarket Historical Society.

== Current and former buildings ==
When it originally opened in 1982, the museum was located on the top floor of the Old Fire Hall at 140 Main Street South.

In October 1990, the museum was moved to 543 Timothy Street in order to take advantage of the greater floor space and available parking.

Since 1996, the museum has been housed in the former North York Registry Office, built in 1884. Built in the Classical Revival style, the building was designated in 1987 under the Ontario Heritage Act for its historical and architectural significance. It served as the regional registry office from its construction until 1980, when the records were moved to the recently built Provincial Court Building at 50 Eagle Street West. The building was then used as the location for the administrative offices of York Region until they were moved to the York Region Administrative Centre in 1993. The museum shares the building with the Newmarket Historical Society Archives as well as Heritage Newmarket.
