= Udora, Ontario =

Human settlement in Ontario, Canada

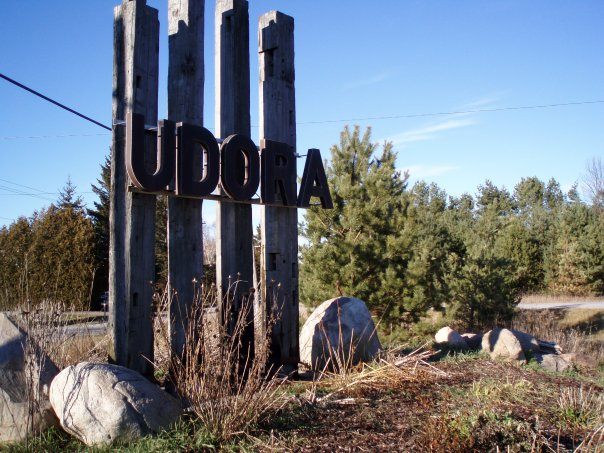
- Udora town sign in the north end on Christmas, 2006
- Interactive map of Udora, Ontario
- Coordinates: 44°15′24″N 79°10′59″W
- Country: Canada
- Province: Ontario
- Regional municipality: York and Durham

Government
  - Mayor of Georgina: Margaret Quirk
  - Mayor of Uxbridge: Dave Barton
  - MPP Georgina: Caroline Mulroney (PCO)
  - MPP Uxbridge: Peter Bethlenfalvy (PCO)
  - MP York—Durham: Jacob Mantle (CPC)

Population (2021)
  - Total: 684
- Time zone: UTC-5 (EST)
  - Summer (DST): UTC-4 (EDT)
- Forward sortation area: L0C, L9P
- Area codes: 705, 905
- NTS Map: 031D06
- GNBC Code: FCYTN

Udora is a small rural hamlet community in central Ontario, Canada. It has a population just over 600 and is situated in the most south-eastern part of Georgina, split between York Region and Durham Region. Originally known as Snoddon Corners, the hamlet of Udora was named after the Snoddon Hotel, established by William Snodden, who laid out village lots and built the hotel in 1854. In 1862, the community was renamed Udora, after settler Udora Bret-hour Webster, though the name is sometimes misspelled as ‘Eudora’.

In the centre of Udora, commonly referred to as the downtown area, a general store served as a functioning post office, up until 2024.

== History ==
In the 1950s, the Independent Toronto Estonian Women’s Association purchased land in the north-west side of Udora, divided the land into 150 subdivided lots for summer cottages to Estonians in Toronto and named the grounds Jõekääru, which means River Bend in English, named because Pefferlaw River runs through the grounds. Local street names in the grounds are also in the native Estonian. With the cottages also came the Estonian Children's Camp, which is still active to date as an Estonian language immersion camp for part of the summer.

Highway 48 (which links Markham to Port Bolster) lies to the north while Highway 12 linking to Whitby and Orillia, lies to the east. Within Udora Ravenshoe Road intersects with Victoria Road/Concession Road 7/Durham Road 1. Area code 705 is bounded to the north while the south of Udora is in Area code 905. The Canadian National Railway runs north of Udora, having its nearest train station in Pefferlaw.

Udora is located about 10 km South of Port Bolster, at Lake Simcoe. About 20 km S/E of Sutton, about 25 to 30 km SW of Beaverton and Orillia, west of Lindsay, north of Uxbridge, about 50 km north of Whitby, about 80 km north of Toronto and NE of Newmarket, Ontario.

West of Victoria lies The Udora Community Hall, opened in 1974, along with a baseball diamond, playground and basketball / tennis (badminton) court. In the winter, the court also hosts a small skate rink for kids.

== Rural Fibre Internet ==
In December 2020, the Government of Canada, in partnership with the Regional Municipality of York, announced a significant investment to bring high-speed internet to rural communities in Ontario, including Udora and Georgina Island. The federal government contributed $2 million through the Connect to Innovate program, while York Region invested $3 million. As of August 2021, access is now available through Vianet.

== Climate ==
Climate data for Udora, Ontario (1991–2020 normals, extremes 1989–2020)
Month	Jan	Feb	Mar	Apr	May	Jun	Jul	Aug	Sep	Oct	Nov	Dec	Year
Record high °C (°F)	14.0 (57.2)	17.0 (62.6)	27.0 (80.6)	30.0 (86.0)	34.0 (93.2)	35.5 (95.9)	35.5 (95.9)	36.0 (96.8)	33.5 (92.3)	29.0 (84.2)	24.0 (75.2)	16.5 (61.7)	36.0 (96.8)
Mean daily maximum °C (°F)	−3.1 (26.4)	−1.8 (28.8)	3.9 (39.0)	11.4 (52.5)	19.0 (66.2)	24.0 (75.2)	26.3 (79.3)	25.4 (77.7)	21.5 (70.7)	13.7 (56.7)	6.5 (43.7)	0.1 (32.2)	12.2 (54.0)
Daily mean °C (°F)	−7.2 (19.0)	−6.5 (20.3)	−1.0 (30.2)	5.8 (42.4)	12.8 (55.0)	17.9 (64.2)	20.3 (68.5)	19.5 (67.1)	15.6 (60.1)	9.0 (48.2)	2.5 (36.5)	−3.5 (25.7)	7.1 (44.8)
Mean daily minimum °C (°F)	−11.7 (10.9)	−11.2 (11.8)	−6.1 (21.0)	0.2 (32.4)	6.5 (43.7)	11.8 (53.2)	14.2 (57.6)	13.4 (56.1)	9.7 (49.5)	4.2 (39.6)	−1.5 (29.3)	−7.1 (19.2)	1.9 (35.4)
Record low °C (°F)	−34.0 (−29.2)	−30.5 (−22.9)	−33.0 (−27.4)	−15.0 (5.0)	−5.0 (23.0)	1.0 (33.8)	5.0 (41.0)	3.5 (38.3)	−2.5 (27.5)	−7.0 (19.4)	−18.0 (−0.4)	−33.0 (−27.4)	−34.0 (−29.2)
Average precipitation mm (inches)	67.0 (2.64)	51.3 (2.02)	50.4 (1.98)	69.3 (2.73)	79.8 (3.14)	102.7 (4.04)	86.4 (3.40)	81.5 (3.21)	80.1 (3.15)	77.6 (3.06)	73.2 (2.88)	64.2 (2.53)	883.4 (34.78)
Average rainfall mm (inches)	25.1 (0.99)	15.4 (0.61)	28.8 (1.13)	62.1 (2.44)	79.5 (3.13)	102.7 (4.04)	86.4 (3.40)	81.5 (3.21)	80.1 (3.15)	75.8 (2.98)	54.6 (2.15)	24.3 (0.96)	716.2 (28.20)
Average snowfall cm (inches)	41.9 (16.5)	35.9 (14.1)	20.9 (8.2)	8.0 (3.1)	0.3 (0.1)	0.0 (0.0)	0.0 (0.0)	0.0 (0.0)	0.0 (0.0)	1.8 (0.7)	18.6 (7.3)	39.9 (15.7)	167.3 (65.9)
Average precipitation days (≥ 0.2 mm)	14.3	10.9	10.7	11.7	11.8	11.1	11.3	10.4	11.0	15.2	13.9	14.1	146.3
Average rainy days (≥ 0.2 mm)	4.2	2.8	6.2	10.6	11.8	11.1	11.3	10.4	11.0	15.1	10.1	5.4	110.0
Average snowy days (≥ 0.2 cm)	11.0	8.9	5.5	1.9	0.07	0.0	0.0	0.0	0.0	0.46	4.6	9.3	41.7
Source: Environment Canada

== Nearest places ==
- Pefferlaw, north
- Sunderland, east
- Leaskdale, immediately south
- Uxbridge, 16 km south
- Zephyr, southwest
- Sutton, west

== Community demographics ==
- Total Population: 684
- Total Dwellings: 304
- Total Land Area in squared KM: 5.45
