= Pefferlaw =

- Unincorporated community
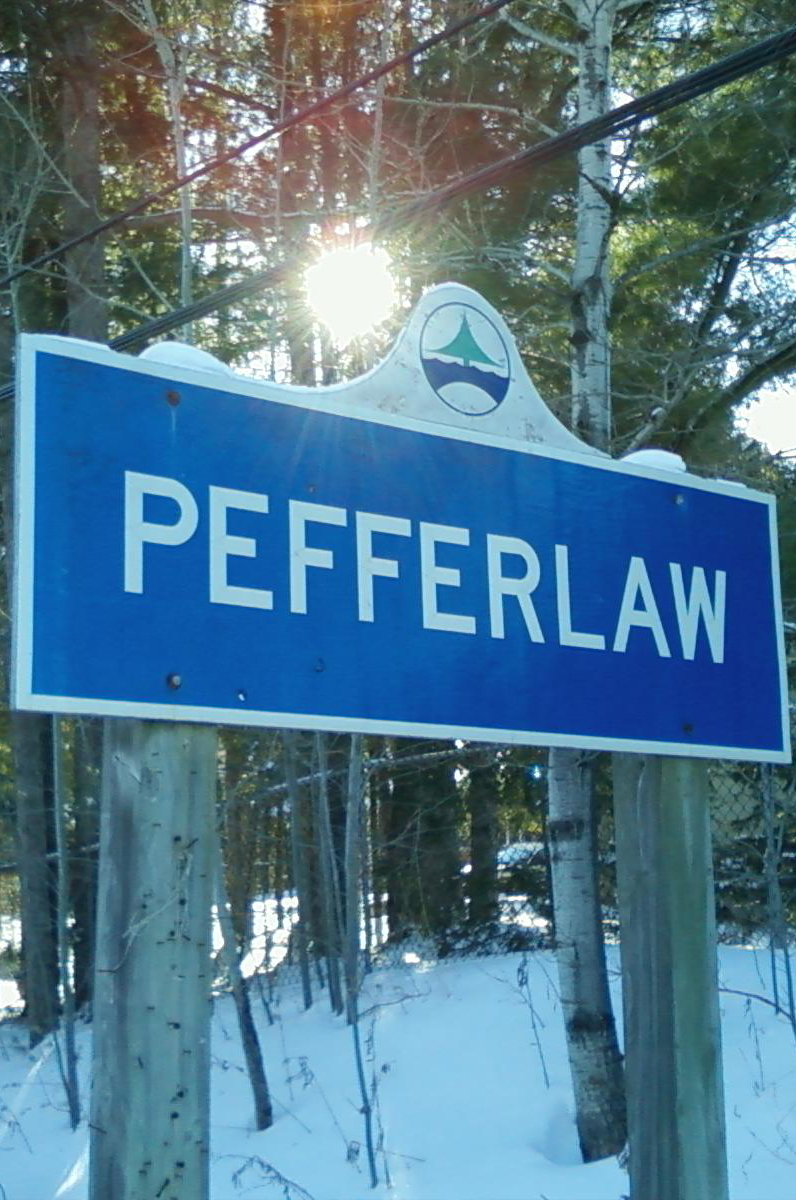
- Entrance sign on Pefferlaw Road, north of the community
- Interactive map of Pefferlaw
- Coordinates: 44°18′53″N 79°12′6″W
- Country: Canada
- Province: Ontario
- Regional municipality: York
- Town: Georgina

Population
  - Estimate (2021) (Note: Pefferlaw is located in Census Tract 5350470.00 within Georgina [Census Subdivision]): 2,951
- Demonym: Pefferlaneans
- Time zone: UTC−5 (EST)
  - Summer (DST): UTC−4 (EDT)
- Forward sortation area: L0E 1N0
- Area code: 705
- NTS Map: 031D06
- GNBC Code: FDLDP

Pefferlaw is a community within the Town of Georgina, located 3 kilometres south of the southeastern shores of Lake Simcoe. The Pefferlaw River runs south of the community's commercial district. Pefferlaw is passed on the north by Highway 48 and Lake Ridge Road (Durham Road 23) to the east, and is serviced by Pefferlaw Road which links these two traffic arteries. Pefferlaw along with Virginia Beach, Udora and Port Bolster is in the 705 area code. The Canadian National railway passes through Pefferlaw and, until the early 1990s, served a train station in the community's commercial district. This railway links Toronto with Orillia and Northern Ontario with Via Rail transcontinental trains heading to Vancouver.

== Geography and information ==
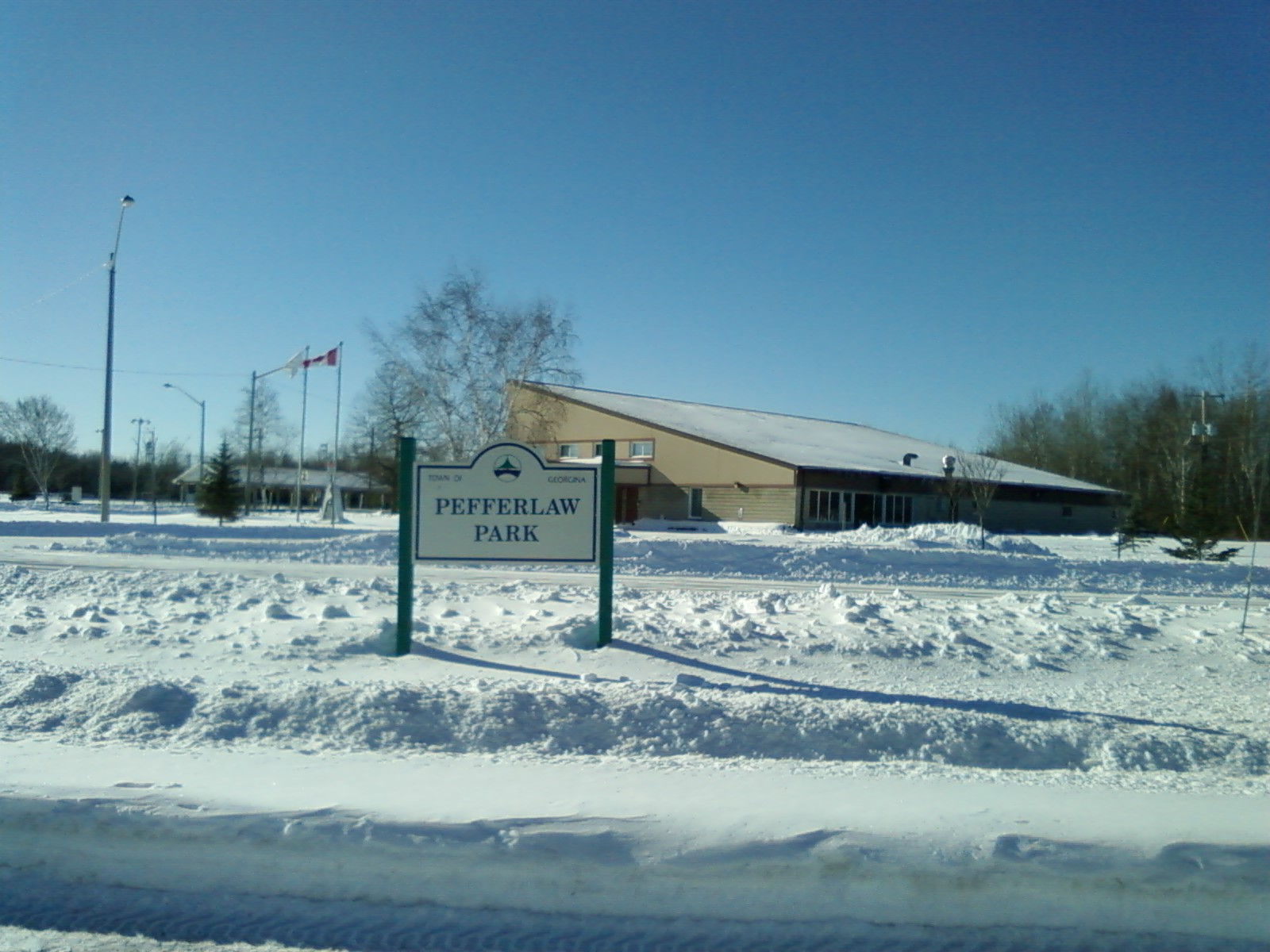
Pefferlaw Lions Hall and park, located in the community's south end The Pefferlaw Lions Community Centre is in the background.

Census information is not available for Pefferlaw. It is counted as part of the Georgina Census division. However, data for Pefferlaw largely falls within the census tract 5350470.00, allowing for estimates.

- Population: about 3,000 (2005 estimate)
- Altitude: about 200 to 250 metres above sea level

The town is largely centered around the Pefferlaw Dam, blocking the Pefferlaw River. The dam is operated by the Lake Simcoe Region Conservation Authority. Pefferlaw's commercial district lies just north of the dam, and features a supermarket, hotel, youth centre, automobile service station, Canada Post office, medical centre with pharmacy, Liquor Control Board of Ontario retail store, and a branch of the Canadian Imperial Bank of Commerce. The town features several public facilities operated by the Town of Georgina, including a public library, community centre, fire station, and a large multi-use park. Cedardale Church is now the only place of worship in Pefferlaw, located just north of the intersection of Morning Glory Road and Pefferlaw Road. The York Region District School Board operates Morning Glory Public School, an elementary school 5 minutes north of town on Highway 48.

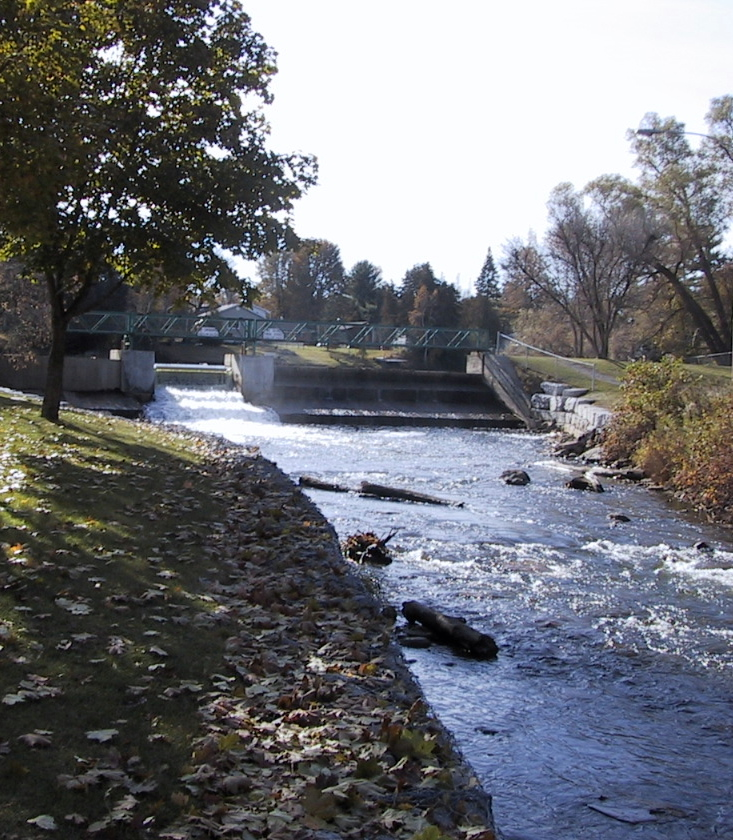
The Pefferlaw Dam, located just south of downtown

Pefferlaw is primarily situated in a forest setting. Farmlands are to the west, the northwest and the north. More farmlands are east of Lake Ridge Road and Pefferlaw. The forests are almost connected with the forests south of Sutton. The forests cover most of the area around Pefferlaw and to the south with a few farmlands as well as within the shoreline of Lake Simcoe. The forests are mainly composed of pine and other varieties of trees and the size is about 600 to 700 square kilometres and about 80% of the area around Pefferlaw.

=== Community groups ===
- 659 Brock Squadron, Royal Canadian Air Cadets
- Pefferlaw Lions Club
- Pefferlaw Association of Ratepayers (PAR)
- Scouts Canada, 1st Pefferlaw Group

=== Approximate driving times to nearby communities ===
- Udora, 10 minutes south
- Cannington, 15 minutes east
- Sutton, 15 minutes west
- Keswick, 20 minutes west
- Beaverton, 20 minutes northeast
- Uxbridge, 20 minutes south
- Sunderland, 25 minutes southeast
- Whitby, 45 minutes south

=== Relative location ===
Pefferlaw is located about 13 kilometres southwest of Beaverton, about 15 kilometres east of Sutton, and about 45 kilometres south of Orillia. It is 37 kilometres west of Lindsay, 23 kilometres north of Uxbridge, about 50 kilometres north of Whitby, about 90 kilometres northeast of Toronto, and 40 kilometres northeast of the nearest major commercial centre and seat of York Region, Newmarket.

== History ==
Pefferlaw was founded in the late 1820s by Captain William Johnson; a British Naval Officer who was released from service in 1815 following the Battle of Waterloo. The name, Pefferlaw, was suggested to Captain Johnson by his brother in remembrance of a field among the heather on their old homestead and means, “a beautiful greensward.”

The first preserved diaries of William Johnson begin in 1832. By that time he had a sawmill, woolen mill and gristmill built at Pefferlaw.

The first store in the village of Pefferlaw was built in August 1833. Soon after, Robert Johnson, brother of William, took over running the store and shortly thereafter built a large two-story red brick house on the edge of the bank beside the store which still stands today. The second store in Pefferlaw was built by George Johnson, son of Captain William, this in 1856.

Banking came to Pefferlaw with the arrival of the C.N.R. Railway in 1906.

The Pefferlaw area, like all early hamlets had its share of hotels – one at every crossroad. The Morning Glory Hotel was built in the 1860s and stood for many years on the site of the present day Morning Glory Public School. The tavern was well patronized by river drivers, lumber workers and stage coach passengers and drivers. The Mansion House Hotel was built in 1884. When it changed owners in 1906 the establishment was renamed, Hotel Belvedere.

Captain Johnson died in 1851 at "Oldcastle", lot 6, conc. 7, Georgina, which was always his home. He is buried there.
