= Sutton, Ontario =

Sutton
- Unincorporated community
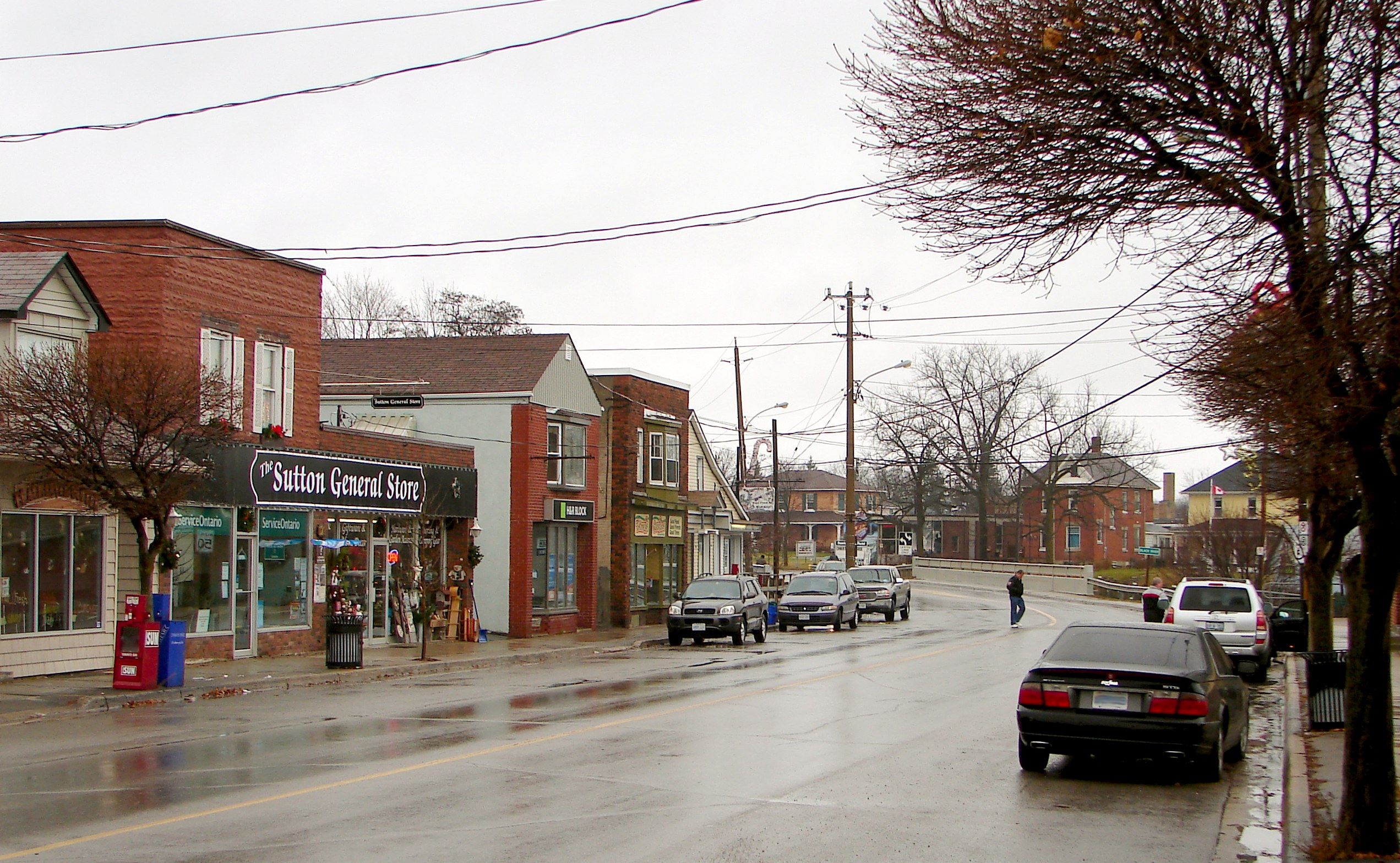

- Location within Southern Ontario
- Coordinates: 44°18′18″N 79°21′29″W
- Country: Canada
- Province: Ontario
- Regional municipality: York
- Town: Georgina

Population (2011)
  - Total: 5,938
  - Density: 455.7/km^{2} (1,180/sq mi)
- Demonym(s): Suttonite, Suttonian
- Time zone: UTC-5 (EST)
  - Summer (DST): UTC-4 (EDT)
- Forward sortation area: L0E
- Area codes: 905 and 289
- NTS Map: 031D06
- GNBC Code: FCUFV

Sutton is a suburban community located nearly 2 km south of Lake Simcoe in Ontario, Canada. The community was formerly a village but is now part of the Town of Georgina after amalgamation with it and North Gwillimbury in 1971. The Black River runs on the north end of the downtown. Highway 48 goes just south of the downtown. Sutton has a population of just over 6,000 people. Sutton is located about 1 hour north of Toronto.

Sutton has a population of 5,938 (2011), which is a -1.4% decrease since 2006.

== Geography ==
Sutton is located in the Regional Municipality of York, and is situated around a small river, the Black River, that flows from the south and East. Sutton is passed by a road linking Woodbine Avenue and the highway linking Toronto and Beaverton (Highway 48) forming a T junction to the southeast. The nearest superhighway is Highway 404 to the southwest which was extended to reach Keswick, Ontario in 2014 at Ravenshoe road and Woodbine Ave. Woodbine Avenue runs from Steeles Avenue at the Toronto-Markham border all the way to Lake drive in Georgina when the road curves and turns into Baseline Road. The road known as Baseline Road connects Sutton to Keswick. Sutton was once bounded with the old township of North Gwillimbury to the west. From the amalgamation, Sutton is in the central part of Georgina. The Canadian National rail runs south of Sutton and links with Toronto and Orillia as well as Northern Ontario. Sutton is located E of Keswick, about 25 to 30 km SW of Beaverton, S of Orillia, W of Lindsay, about 12 to 15 km N of Mount Albert, about 70 to 75 km N of Toronto and about 35 km NE of Newmarket.

Sutton is sandwiched between forests and farmlands. A large forest dominates the south and southeast covering about 50 to 100 km^{2} directly outside Sutton. The forest are mainly made up of pine and other varieties of trees. Farmlands cover the west and southwest dominating about 50 km^{2} and to the east. The downtown streets are aligned at a 45° angle. Snake Island is situated to the northwest. A small bay is to the northeast.

Housing developments came in the mid-20th century to the northern part and continued slowly until the 1980s. The subdivision 2 km to the east continued in the 1980s and the early-1990s whereas each street is alphabetized from A to L. Housing projects later slowed in the 1990s and the 2000s and the population has slowed. Cottages are also found in the area located along the shore of Lake Simcoe.

== History ==
The first inhabitants were Indigenous people (Ojibwe), as Sutton was a rich area for hunting, fishing, and gathering thousands of years ago.

James O'Brien Bourchier was the first settler in 1821 and built saw and grist mills. The community was originally named Bourchier's Mills, but was renamed Sutton West in 1885, possibly after Sutton-on-Hull in East Yorkshire. However, it's usually called just Sutton.

== Attractions ==
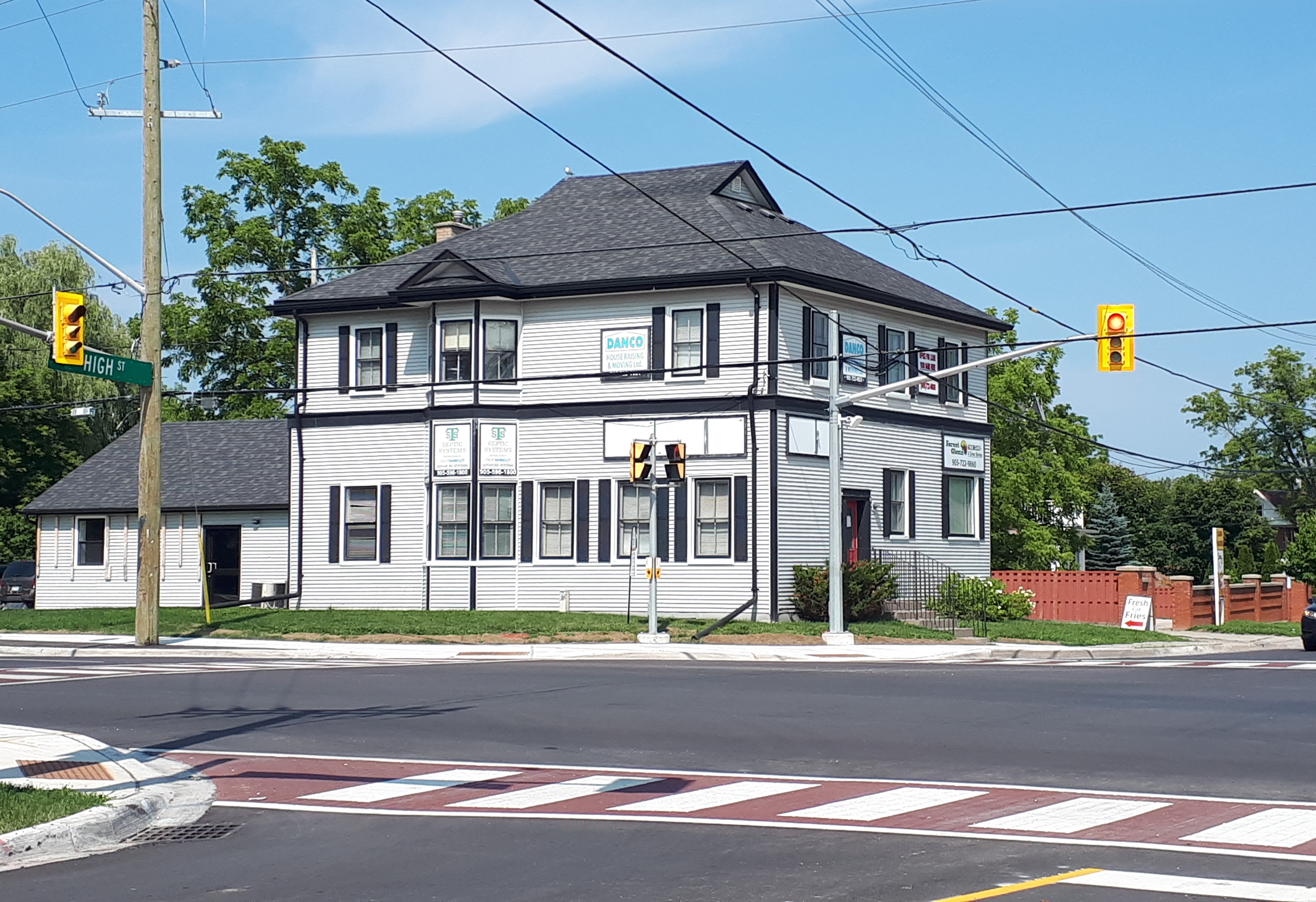
Sutton Radial Station, at the corner of High Street and Dalton Road

=== Sibbald Point Provincial Park ===
Sibbald Point Provincial Park is a day use and campground facility, with a large sandy beach, electrical and non-electrical sites, hiking trails, boating access to Lake Simcoe, and the Sibbald Family Museum.

=== Pioneer Village ===
Located near the shore of Lake Simcoe, the Pioneer Village is a 10-acre space with many buildings to teach the history of Georgina between the years of 1850 and 1920. There is a one-room school house, general store, train station, blacksmith shop, an apothecary and a log house. They also have many archives including family documents, land records, photos, and scrapbooks. The Pioneer village holds tours, camps, workshops, and other events throughout the season. Admission is granted by donation unless specified for a certain event.

=== Beaches ===
Sutton is home to many beaches including De La Salle Park, Holmes Point Park, Jackson's Point/Bonnie Park, North Gwillimbury Park, Willow Beach Conservation Area, Willow Wharf, and Young's Harbour. These areas are extremely popular in the summer months, attracting tourism, holding sports, activities and events.

=== Sutton Fair and Horse Show ===
The Sutton Fair & Horse Show is an annual event that takes place at the fairgrounds located near the Sutton arena. The four-day event on the second weekend in August is put on by the Sutton Agricultural Society. The Sutton Fair is held at the Sutton Fair Grounds which are located at 3 Fairpark Lane, in Sutton West, Ontario, Canada. Sutton is located in York Region, Ontario, just north of Toronto. The event grounds are available for rental during the rest of the year. The location offers parking onsite, 2 pavilions, 3 horse rings (1 dirt and 2 grass rings), race track, outdoor stage, ticket booths, barricades/gates and more. The fair contains a variety of events including Horse & Livestock Competitions, Home craft Exhibits, Truck & Tractor Pull, Dog Show, Horse Pull, Demolition Derby, Worlds Finest Midway. Arena displays and vendors set up all around the premises are sure to have something that will catch your eye.

=== Canada Day ===
With the new ROC (Recreational Outdoors Centre), Canada Day festivities are held in a much larger and accommodating space. Live entertainment, children's activities, food, Ribfest, and fireworks are the main attractions.

=== Santa Claus Parade of Lights ===
The annual Santa Clause Parade of Lights takes place beginning at 5pm to makes Christmas lights shine on the floats. The parade begins at Lake Drive East and Dalton Road and ends at the Sutton Fairgrounds.

=== Notable people ===
Ailish Forfar, former professional women's hockey player for the Markham Thunder of the CWHL and represented Canada on the international stage at the 2019 Winter Universiade. She is now a host on Sportsnet and the Sportsnet Radio Network.

Chloe Daniels, professional rugby sevens player for Team Canada’s National sevens team. Playing in the 2024 Summer Olympics in Paris, France and winning a silver medal. She currently plays for Queen’s University Women’s Rugby Team in Ontario, Canada.

== Nearest places ==
- Keswick, west
- Mount Albert, south
- Pefferlaw, east
- Jackson's Point, north
- Beaverton, east
