= Victoria County, Ontario =

Historical county in Ontario, Canada

County of Victoria
- County of Canada
- 1863–2001
- A historic map of Victoria County, published in 1881.
- Capital: Lindsay, Ontario
- Government
  - Type: Democracy
- Warden
  - 1863: Patrick McHugh (first)
- History
  - Separation from the United Counties of Peterborough and Victoria: 1863
  - Withdrawal of seven townships to the District of Muskoka: 1868 (detached), 1877 (withdrawn)
  - Withdrawal of three townships to the Provisional County of Haliburton: 1874
  - Manvers Township ceded from Durham County: 1973
  - Amalgamated to form the City of Kawartha Lakes, as a result of the Common Sense Revolution: 2001
- Political subdivisions: List: Emily Township; Ops Township; Mariposa Township; Verulam Township; Fenelon Township; Eldon Township; Somerville Township; Bexley Township; Carden Township; Laxton, Digby and Longford Township; Dalton Township; Manvers Township
Preceded by	Succeeded by
United Counties of Peterborough and Victoria	Kawartha Lakes

The County of Victoria, or Victoria County, was a county in the Canadian province of Ontario. It was formed in 1854 as The United Counties of Peterborough and Victoria, and separated from Peterborough in 1863. In 2001, the county was dissolved and reformed as the city of Kawartha Lakes. While British settlement began in 1821, the area that was encompassed by Victoria County had already been inhabited by First Nations, including by the Wendat.

== History ==
The history of Victoria County began with the passing of the Constitutional Act in 1791, dividing Canada into two provinces: Upper Canada (present day Ontario) and Lower Canada (present day Québec); and appointing a lieutenant-governor for each.

The first lieutenant-governor of Upper Canada was Colonel John Graves Simcoe, who surveyed the province and set out tracts of land for immigrants with genuine interests. Before the land that became Victoria County could be surveyed, however, speculators had Simcoe removed from office in 1796, and the land was secured from settlement for over 20 years.

Following the War of 1812, a large wave of immigration prompted the province to purchase more land from local Indian tribes. On 5 November 1818, six Mississauga chiefs, Buckquaquet of the Eagles, Pishikinse of the Reindeers, Paudash of the Cranes, Cahgahkishinse of the Pike, Cahgageewin of the Snakes, and Pininse of the White Oaks, met in Port Hope. There they surrendered the rights to over four thousand square kilometres of land, known as the "Mississauga Tract". In exchange, the Indians (numbering about 400) were to receive $750 per year in goods. However, the government later changed this to $10 per year for each living person born before the deal was signed.

The Mississauga Tract included all of Victoria and Peterborough counties, as well as parts of 28 adjacent townships. Following the purchase, the land became Newcastle District in 1802. In 1845, it was renamed Colborne District consisting of the County of Peterborough. In 1851, Peterborough County was divided into the counties of Peterborough and Victoria, which were united for municipal purposes as the United Counties of Peterborough and Victoria.

Townships forming the United Counties of Peterborough and Victoria (1851)
County of Peterborough	County of Victoria
Belmont; Methuen; Burleigh; Dummer; Harvey; Douro; Smith; Monaghan North; Asphodel; Ennismore; Otonabee	Mariposa; Ops; Emily; Eldon; Fenelon; Bexley; Verulam; Somerville

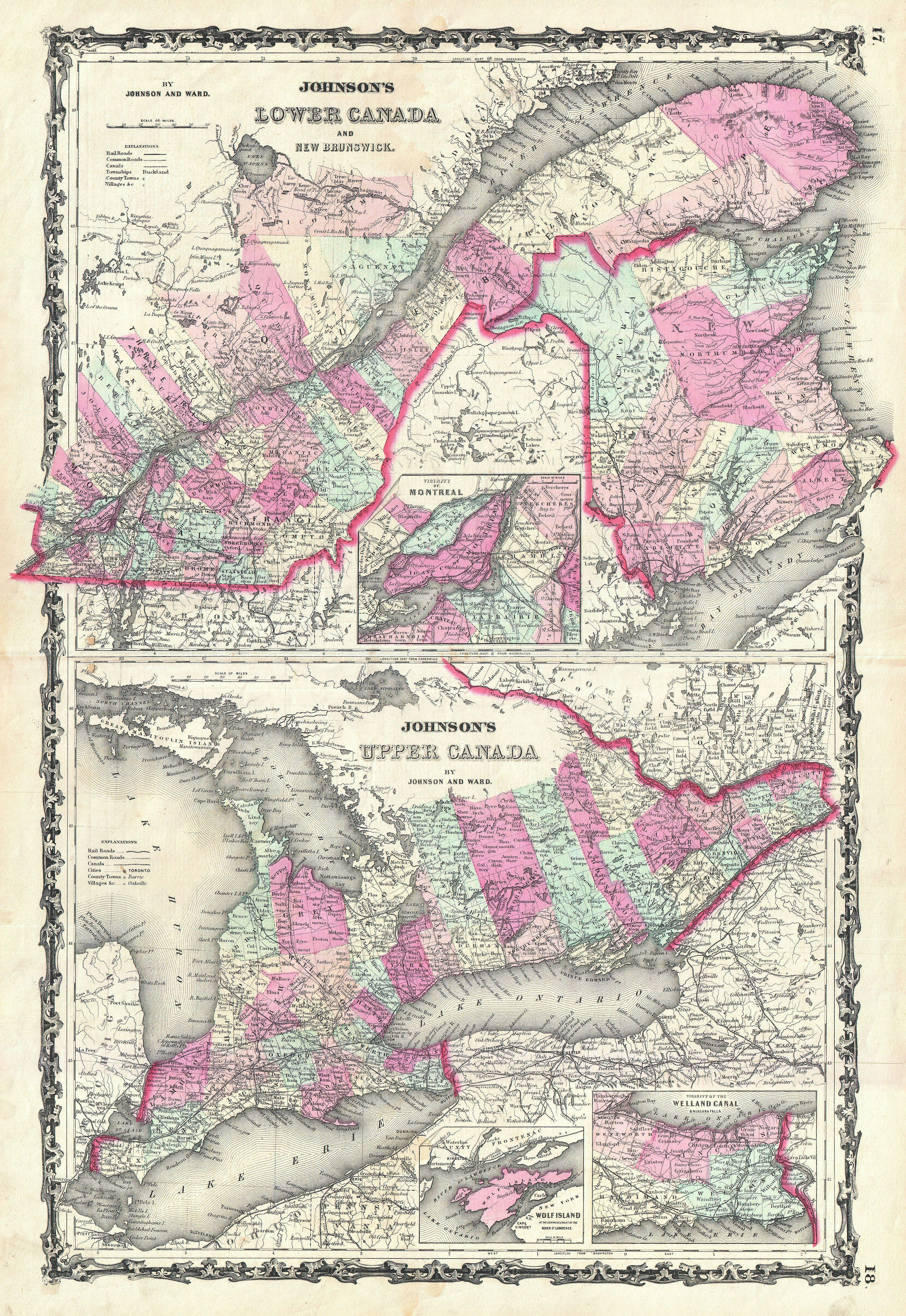
1862 Johnson Map of Ontario and Quebec. The full extent of Victoria County at that time is highlighted in green.

Extent of Victoria county in 1974, showing the annexation of Manvers Township.

A plebiscite was authorized in 1856 to facilitate the creation of a provisional county council for Victoria, but, as the united counties council delayed conducting it, a further Act was passed in 1861 to compel its being held, following which the provisional council was formed. and its formal separation took place in 1863.

Further townships were surveyed in the following years that were attached to the County, extending its reach northwards. In 1868, the townships of Ryde, Draper, Macaulay, Stephenson, Brunel, McLean and Oakley were detached from the County and transferred to the new District of Muskoka, and the townships of Stisted, Chaffey, Franklin and Ridout were detached in a similar manner in 1873. They were not withdrawn for municipal purposes until their annexation to Simcoe County in 1877. The townships of Anson, Hindon and Lutterworth were also withdrawn from the County in 1874 and transferred to the new Provisional County of Haliburton.

In 1974, as a result of the creation of the Regional Municipality of Durham, Manvers Township was withdrawn from Durham County and transferred to Victoria County.

On 1 January 2001, Victoria County was dissolved, and its townships and incorporated communities were amalgamated to form the City of Kawartha Lakes, a name chosen because of the prominence of the lakes in the geography of the region.

== Organization before amalgamation in 2001 ==
It encompassed 2,855.56 square kilometres (1,102.54 mi^{2})

=== Townships ===
Victoria County consisted of 13 separate townships and 6 incorporated villages with their own local governments.

Population centres are listed in parentheses:

- Bexley (Victoria Road, Coboconk)
- Carden (Dalrymple)
- Dalton (Sebright, Uphill, Sadowa)
- Eldon (Glenarm)
- Emily (Downeyville, Fowlers Corners)
- Fenelon (Isaacs Glen, Powles Corners)
- Laxton, Digby and Longford (Uphill, Norland)
- Longford (uninhabited)
- Manvers (Janetville, Bethany)
- Mariposa (Oakwood, Little Britain, Manilla)
- Ops (Reaboro)
- Somerville (Coboconk, Kinmount)
- Verulam (Dunsford, Bobcaygeon)

The township of Laxton, Digby and Longford is an amalgamation of the once individual townships of Digby and Laxton, and half of the original Longford Township. The separate township of Longford is uninhabited, though dotted with abandoned logging towns.

=== Incorporated communities ===
- Town of Lindsay
- Village of Bobcaygeon
- Village of Fenelon Falls
- Village of Omemee
- Village of Sturgeon Point
- Village of Woodville

=== Unincorporated communities and hamlets ===
- Ancona Point
- Argyle
- Avery Point
- Baddow
- Baker Trail
- Ballyduff
- Barclay
- Bellevue
- Bethany
- Bethel
- Birch Point
- Bolsover
- Brunswick
- Burnt River
- Burton
- Bury's Green
- Cambray
- Cameron
- Camp Kagawong
- Campbells Beach
- Coboconk
- Corsons Siding
- Cowan's Bay
- Crawfords Beach
- Cresswell
- Crosshill
- Cunningham's Corners
- Dalrymple
- Dartmoor^{*}
- Daytonia Beach
- Dunsford
- East Emily
- Eldon Station
- Fairburn Corner
- Fee's Landing
- Feir Mill
- Fell Station
- Fingerboard
- Fleetwood^{*}
- Fowler's Corners
- Fox's Corners
- Frank Hill
- Franklin
- Gilsons Point
- Glamorgan
- Glandine
- Glenarm
- Glenway Village
- Grasshill
- Greenhurst-Thurstonia
- Hickory Beach
- Hillhead Corners
- Horncastle^{*}
- Hukish
- Isaacs Glen
- Janetville
- Joyvista Estates
- Kenedon Park
- Krenrei
- Kenstone Beach
- Keystone Beach
- King's Wharf
- Kinmount
- Kirkfield
- Lake Dalrymple
- Lancaster Bay
- Lifford
- Linden Valley
- Little Britain
- Long Beach
- Long Point
- Lorneville
- Lotus
- MacKenzie Point
- Mallards Bay
- Manilla
- Manvers
- Mariposa
- McCrackin's Beach
- McGuire Beach
- Newmans Beach
- Norland
- Oak Hill
- Oakdene Point
- Oakwood
- O'Donnell Landing
- Orange Corners
- Pickerel Point
- Pleasant Point
- Pontypool
- Port Hoover
- Powles Corners
- Reaboro
- Red Cap Beach
- Rohallion
- Rokeby
- Rosedale
- Sadowa
- Salem Corners
- Sandy Point
- Sebright
- Silver Lake
- Snug Harbour
- Southview Estates
- Sullivan's Bay
- Sylvan Glen Beach
- Taylor's Corners
- Tracey's Hill
- Union Creek
- Valentia
- Verulam Park
- Victoria Place
- View Lake
- Washburn Island
- Watson's Siding
- Yelverton

=== Abandoned towns, post offices and church villages ===
- Aros
- Dongola
- Downeyville
- Fleetwood Station
- Hartley
- Head Lake
- Islay
- Mariposa Station
- Mount Horeb^{*}
- Palestine
- Ragged Rapids^{*}
- St. Mary's
- Uphill
- Zion

Note:

^{*} ghost town

== Demographics ==
Historical census populations – Victoria County, Ontario

Year	Pop.	±%
1871	29,685	—
1881	33,655	+13.4%
1891	32,991	−2.0%
1901	31,952	−3.1%
1911	30,179	−5.5%
1921	27,786	−7.9%

Year	Pop.	±%
1931	25,844	−7.0%
1941	25,934	+0.3%
1951	27,127	+4.6%
1956	28,248	+4.1%
1961	29,750	+5.3%
1966	30,917	+3.9%

Year	Pop.	±%
1971	34,242	+10.8%
1976	43,543	+27.2%
1981	47,854	+9.9%
1986	52,599	+9.9%
1991	63,332	+20.4%
1996	67,926	+7.3%

Population counts are not adjusted for boundary changes.
Source: Statistics Canada

+ Census Canada
Township	Population		
Township	1991	1996	2001
Bexley	1,191	1,306	1,325
Carden	781	887	888
Dalton	423	442	474
Eldon	2,669	2,956	3,087
Emily	6,307	6,724	6,944
Fenelon	5,710	5,931	6,240
Laxton, Digby and Longford	1,086	1,114	1,052
Manvers	5,166	5,624	5,830
Mariposa	6,906	7,456	7,869
Ops	4,027	4,311	4,955
Somerville	2,045	2,238	2,241
Verulam	3,982	4,373	4,313
Incorporated areas
Bobcaygeon	2,562	2,753	2,854
Fenelon Falls	1,888	2,040	1,874
Lindsay, Ontario	16,696	17,638	16,930
Lindsay census agglomeration (Ops including Lindsay)	20,723	21,949	21,885
Omemee	1,103	1,271	1,319
Sturgeon Point	110	111	107
Woodville	680	751	871
Total
Kawartha Lakes	63,332	67,926	69,179
Ontario	10,084,885	10,753,573	11,410,046

The population is mostly rural, with only 34% living in urban areas.

== Infrastructure ==
=== Colonization roads ===
Victoria County was first opened up to settlement in the 1821. At this time, the primary routes for entering the county-to-be were narrow trails. Settlers were offered land on the condition that they help further the progress of concession roads into the region. This was often met with the bare minimum, and progress was slow.

The Land Act of 1853 provided funding for the development of roads throughout the wilderness of Upper Canada. Grants were administered by the Department of Agriculture to survey and build the new roads. The roads followed the tradition of old Roman roads, and cut through the wilderness in a straight line, veering only when the terrain was impassable, but cutting through swamps and hills otherwise. Four primary roads were built: the Cameron Road, the Bobcaygeon Road, the Monck Road, and the Portage Road.

http://www.ontariogenealogy.com/Victoria/settleme.html http://www.ontariogenealogy.com/Victoria/history/victoriacountypioneers2.html

The Cameron road, now mostly encompassed by Highway 35, provided access from Lake Ontario to the northern limits of Victoria;

The Bobcaygeon Road, begun in 1853, traversed north and south along the present-day eastern boundary of the region, and is mostly encompassed by former Highway 121;

The Monck Road, which connected Lake Couchiching to Bancroft, encompassed partially by former Highway 503, now City Road 45;

The Portage Road, connecting Lake Simcoe to Balsam Lake, encompassed entirely by former Highway 48, now City Road 48

== Education ==
At one time the Victoria County Board of Education provided educational services. In 1999 it was amalgamated into the Trillium Lakelands District School Board.

== See also ==
- List of townships in Ontario
- Royal eponyms in Canada
