= Verulam Township =

Former township in southern Ontario, Canada

Coordinates: 44°32′N 78°37′W

Verulam Township within former Victoria County

The Township of Verulam is a geographic township within the city of Kawartha Lakes. It was bounded on the north by the geographic township of Somerville, the south by the geographic township of Emily, the west by the geographic township of Fenelon, and the east by Trent Lakes. For the purposes of government, land surveying and reference, it is now properly referred to as the "Geographic Township of Verulam".

The township was ten concessions (each 7/8 mile or 1.4 kilometres wide) and thirty-two lots deep, and was surveyed on the Lake Ontario frontage system. Sturgeon Lake completely bisected the township from west to east.

Errors in surveying across the lake resulted in jogs in many of lot lines north of the lake in Concessions IV through X, and was the cause of the irregular northern boundary. The township also included parts of Concession XIX of the Geographic Township of Harvey which were isolated from the rest of that township by Pigeon Lake in the east.

The Township of Verulam was part of Peterborough County until 1850, when Victoria County was formed. It is now part of the City of Kawartha Lakes.

Summer at Verulam Park

== Communities ==
- Bobcaygeon, former township seat
- Ancona Point
- Dunsford
- Greenhurst-Thurstonia
- Kenstone Beach
- Red Rock
- Sturgeon Point

== History ==
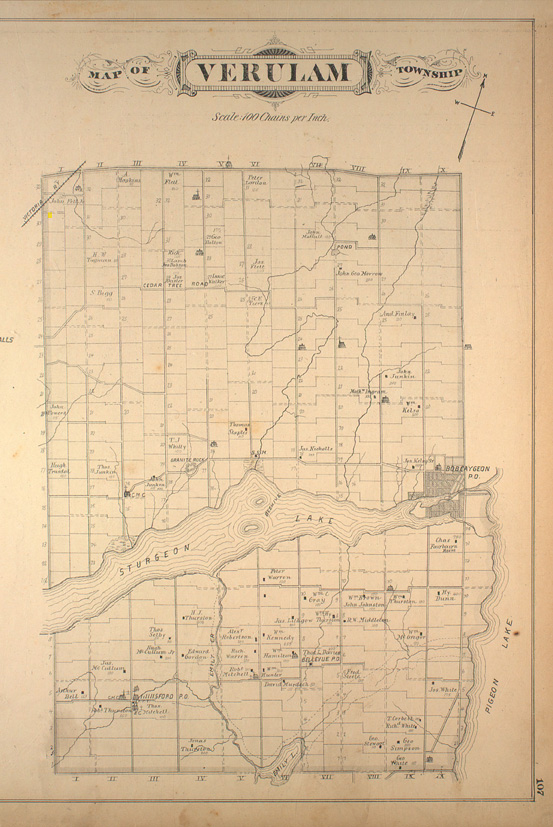
Verulam Township, 1880

In 1818, six chiefs of the Mississauga First Nations met at Port Hope to sign a treaty to convey to the Crown all the land which is now City of Kawartha Lakes and Peterborough County for the sum of about £740.

Verulam Township was named for the Earl of Verulam, James Walter Grimston (1775 - 1845) who was the brother-in-law of Lord Liverpool, Prime Minister of the United Kingdom from 1812 to 1827. The township was surveyed in 1831 by the government of Upper Canada and lots were first offered for sale in 1832, for 8 shillings per acre.

== Agriculture ==
Lumbering was the first important industry to be developed, as the township had abundant stands of white pine up until about 1904, when loggers moved northward into Haliburton and what is now Algonquin Park. Agriculture in various forms was also pursued with the land south of the lake most suitable for crops. Dairying is still an important industry: Kawartha Dairy Company, the last large remaining dairy in the area serving south central Ontario, is in operation at Bobcaygeon. The Verulam Agricultural Society founded in 1858, now the Bobcaygeon Agricultural Society, still meets and holds an annual Fall Fair at its Fairgrounds located on the main island of Bobcaygeon.

== Settlement ==
Settlement first occurred at Bobcaygeon, at the eastern end of the township with the 1832 arrival of Thomas Need from England. Thomas Need built a lumber and grist mill, laid out a village plot, founded a Post Office, and supervised the building of the first lock on the Trent-Severn Waterway. Several other notable settlements arose over the years, including the hamlet of Dunsford, the police village of Greenhurst-Thurstonia, and the police village of Sturgeon Point.

== Transportation ==
The lakes were important to early transportation, though lumber interests mostly controlled use of the waterway until the system was completed in 1920. The Trent-Severn Waterway was originally intended as a defensive and commercial route from the upper Great Lakes through to Lake Ontario, however delays to its completion through the railway- and highway-building eras have relegated the canal to purely pleasure-craft use. Today, the Trent-Severn Waterway is a National Historic Site of Canada under the jurisdiction of Parks Canada.

Water and corduroy roads were the entrance to Verulam Township until in 1879, the Victoria Railway (later the Canadian National Railway) was constructed between Lindsay and Haliburton, via Fell's Station in the northwest. In 1904, the Canadian Pacific Railway was completed to Bobcaygeon from Lindsay and Burketon Jct. Improvements to the highway system continued until the need for railways became redundant. The line to Bobcaygeon was abandoned in 1957. The railway through Fell's Station was abandoned in 1987 following the burning of the McLaren Creek bridge near Lindsay.

== Verulam Township today ==
Although there have been various lumbering, manufacturing, farming and mining operations within the township, today the primary industry is tourism. Settlement consists mostly of small farms, with concentrations of cottages along the shores of Sturgeon Lake. Many marinas are located on Sturgeon Lake, and a system of well-developed parks are available for day use.

== See also ==
- List of townships in Ontario

== Bibliography ==
1. W.H. Smith, "Canadian Gazetteer" Toronto, Canada: 1846.
2. Dr. W.D. Thomas, "Bobcaygeon: Hub of the Kawarthas" Bobcaygeon, Ontario: 1980
3. Watson Kirkconnell, "County of Victoria Centennial History" Lindsay, Ontario: 1967
4. Corporation of the Village of Bobcaygeon, "Council Minutes" Bobcaygeon, Ontario: 1921 - 1958.
