= Ops Township =

Former township in southern Ontario, Canada

Township of Ops
- Former township
- Interactive map of Township of Ops
- Coordinates: 44°20′14″N 78°43′13″W
- Country: Canada
- Province: Ontario
- County: Victoria County
- Amalgamated: 1 January 2001
- Incorporated into: City of Kawartha Lakes

The Township of Ops was a municipality located in the centre of the former Victoria County, now the city of Kawartha Lakes.

The township contained the communities of Reaboro and Fleetwood, and also surrounded the largest population centre in the county, Lindsay.

== See also ==
- List of townships in Ontario
