= List of townships in Ontario =

This is a list of townships in the Canadian province of Ontario. Townships are listed by census division.

Map of Townships in Ontario South of the French River c. 1950 - 1960

== Northern Ontario ==
=== Northeastern Ontario ===
==== Algoma District ====
Algoma District in Ontario

Historical/Geographic Townships

- Abbott
- Aberdeen Additional
- Abigo
- Abotossaway
- Abraham
- Acton
- Aguonie
- Alanen
- Alarie
- Albanel
- Albert
- Alderson
- Allenby
- Allouez
- Amik
- Amundsen
- Anderson
- André
- Archibald
- Arnott
- Ashley
- Assad
- Assef
- Asselin
- Atkinson
- Avis
- Awenge
- Aweres
- Bailloquet
- Barager
- Barnes
- Bayfield
- Beange
- Beaton
- Beaudin
- Beaudry
- Beauparlant
- Beebe
- Behmann
- Bernst
- Bird
- Bolger
- Boon
- Bostwick
- Bouck
- Bourinot
- Bracci
- Bray
- Breckenbridge
- Bridgland
- Bright Additional
- Bright
- Brimacombe
- Broome
- Broughton
- Brule
- Bruyere
- Buchan
- Buckles
- Bullock
- Butcher
- Byng
- Cadeau
- Cannard
- Carmody
- Carney
- Casson
- Chabanel
- Challener
- Chapais
- Charbonneau
- Chelsea
- Chenard
- Chesley Additional
- Chesley
- Cholette
- Clouston
- Cobden
- Coderre
- Coffin Additional
- Common
- Concobar
- Conking
- Cooper
- Copenace
- Corbiere
- Corboy
- Cowie
- Cromlech
- Cross
- Cudney
- Curtis
- Cuthbertson
- Dablon
- Dagle
- Dahl
- Dambrossio
- Daumont
- Davieaux
- Davin
- Day
- Deagle
- Debassige
- Del Villano
- Dennis
- Deroche
- Derry
- Desbiens
- Doherty
- Dolson
- Doucett
- Downer
- Dowsley
- Drew
- Dubreuilville
- Dulhut
- Dumas
- Duncan
- Dunphy
- Eaket
- Ebbs
- Echum
- Elgie
- Emiry
- Ericson
- Ermine
- Esquega
- Esten
- Ewen
- Fabbro
- Farquhar
- Fenwick
- Ferrier
- Fiddler
- Finan
- Fisher
- Flanders
- Flanders
- Foch
- Fontaine
- Foucault
- Foulds
- Frances
- Franchère
- Franz
- Frost
- Gaisahk
- Galbraith
- Gapp
- Gaudette
- Gaudry
- Gaunt
- Gerow
- Gervais
- Gilbertson
- Giles
- Gilmore
- Gisborn
- Gladstone
- Glasgow
- Goodwillie
- Gould
- Gourlay
- Grasett
- Greenwood
- Grenoble
- Grootenboer
- Groseilliers
- Grossman
- Grzela
- Guindon
- Gunterman
- Hadley
- Haig
- Hallett
- Hambleton
- Handleman
- Haughton
- Havilland
- Havrot
- Hawkins
- Hayward
- Hembruff
- Herrick
- Hiawatha
- Hilton
- Hodgins
- Hoffman
- Home
- Hook
- Hornepayne
- Hotte
- Hughes
- Hughson
- Hunt
- Huotari
- Hurlburt
- Hynes
- Irving
- Isaac
- Jackson
- Jacobson
- Jarvis
- Jessiman
- Jocelyn
- Jogues
- Johns
- Johnson
- Jollineau
- Joubin
- Juillette
- Kamichisitit
- Kane
- Kapuskasing
- Kars
- Keating Additional
- Keesickquayish
- Kehoe
- Kildare
- Killins
- Kincaid
- Kirkwall
- Kirkwood
- Knicely
- Korah
- Labelle
- Labonté
- Laforme
- Laird
- Laliberté
- Lamming
- Landriault
- Lane
- Larkin
- LaRonde
- Larson
- Lascelles
- Lastheels
- Laughren
- LaVérendrye
- Lawlor
- LeCaron
- Leclaire
- Lefebvre
- Lefroy
- Legarde Additional
- Legarde
- Legge
- Leguerrier
- Lehman
- Leluk
- Lendrum
- Lerwick
- Lessard
- Levesque
- Lewis
- Ley
- Lipton
- Lizar
- Loach
- Lockeyer
- Long
- Lougheed
- Lunkie
- Macaskill
- Macdonald
- Mack
- Maeck
- Magone
- Makawa
- Mandamin
- Maness
- Marjorie
- Marne
- Martel
- Martin
- Matthews
- Maude
- McAughey
- McDowell
- McEwing
- McFarlan
- McGiverin
- McGowan
- McIIveen
- McKeough
- McMahon
- McMurray
- McNie
- McParland
- Meath
- Meen
- Memaskwosh
- Ménard
- Menzies
- Mercer
- Meredith
- Michano
- Mildred
- Minnipuka
- Miskokomon
- Monestime
- Mons
- Montgomery
- Moorehouse
- Morin
- Morningstar
- Mosambik
- Musquash
- Nadjiwon
- Nagagami
- Nahwegezhic
- Nameigos
- Naveau
- Nebonaionquet
- Nebotik
- Newlands
- Nicholas
- Nicolet
- Noganosh
- Norberg
- Nouvel
- Nuttall
- Odlum
- Olinyk
- Olsen
- Oscar
- Oshell
- Otter
- Ouellette
- Palmer
- Parke
- Parkinson
- Parrott
- Patton
- Pawis
- Pearkes
- Peever
- Pelletier
- Pennefather
- Peterson
- Piche
- Pine
- Plourde
- Plummer Additional
- Poncet
- Poulin
- Prescott
- Prince
- Proctor
- Puskuta
- Quill
- Raaflaub
- Rabazo
- Radisson
- Raimbault
- Recollet
- Redden
- Redsky
- Reilly
- Renwick
- Restoule
- Riggs
- Rioux
- Rix
- Rollins
- Root
- Rose
- Rouche
- Rowat
- Royal
- Roy
- Runalls
- Running
- Ruston
- Ryan
- Sagard
- St-Germain
- St. Joseph
- St. Julian
- Sampson
- Saunders
- Sayer
- Scarfe
- Scholfield
- Scrivener
- Shanly
- Shawkence
- Shedden
- Shields
- Shingwaukonce
- Shulman
- Simons
- Simpson
- Slater
- Slievert
- Smilsky
- Snow
- Spragge
- Stefansson
- Stone
- Stoney
- Strain
- Strickland
- Striker
- Sturgeon
- Suganqueb
- Tabobondung
- Talbott
- Tarbutt
- Tarbutt Additional
- Tarentorus
- Teasdale
- Tedder
- Templeton
- Tennyson
- Thessalon
- Thompson
- Thorp
- Tiernan
- Tilley
- Tilston
- Timbrell
- Timmermans
- Tolmonen
- Tronsen
- Tupper
- Tweedle
- Usnac
- Vance
- VanKoughnet
- Varley
- Vasiloff
- Vibert
- Victoria
- Viel
- Villeneuve
- Wagg
- Walls
- Wardle
- Warpula
- Waswa
- Wawa
- Wawia
- Way-White
- Wells
- Welsh
- West
- White River
- Whitman
- Wicksteed
- Winget
- Winkler
- Wiseman
- Wishart
- Wlasy
- Woolrich
- Worton
- Yaremko

Current Municipalities

- Town of Blind River
- Town of Bruce Mines
- Dubreuilville Township
- City of Elliot Lake
- Hilton Township
- Village of Hilton Beach
- Hornepayne Township
- Huron Shores Township
- Jocelyn Township
- Johnson Township
- Laird Township
- Macdonald, Meredith and Aberdeen Additional Township
- The North Shore Township
- Plummer Additional Township
- Prince Township
- Shedden Township
- St. Joseph Township
- City of Sault Ste. Marie
- Town of Spanish
- Tarbutt Township
- Town of Thessalon
- Wawa Township
- White River Township

Unorganized Areas

- Algoma, Unorganized, North Part
- Algoma, Unorganized, South East Part

==== Cochrane District ====
Cochrane District in Ontario

Historical/Geographic Townships

- Abbotsford
- Acres
- Adair
- Adams
- Adanac
- Agassiz
- Agate
- Aitken
- Alexandra
- Amery
- Ardagh
- Aubin
- Auden
- Aurora
- Avon
- Bannerman
- Barker
- Barlow
- Barnet
- Beatty
- Beck
- Belford
- Ben Nevis
- Beniah
- Benoit
- Berry
- Bessborough
- Bicknell
- Birdsall
- Bisley
- Black
- Black River
- Blackstock
- Blakelock
- Blount
- Bond
- Bonis
- Bourassa
- Bowman
- Bowyer
- Boyce
- Boyle
- Bradburn
- Bradette
- Bradley
- Bragg
- Brain
- Bristol
- Brower
- Burrell
- Burritt
- Burstall
- Byers
- Caithness
- Calder
- Calvert
- Canfield
- Cargill
- Carman
- Carmichael
- Carnegie
- Caron
- Carr
- Carroll
- Carscallen
- Carss
- Case
- Casgrain
- Casselman
- Challies
- Chipman
- Clavet
- Clay
- Clergue
- Clifford
- Clive
- Clute
- Cockshutt
- Cody
- Colquhoun
- Cook
- Cote
- Coulson
- Crawford
- Cumming
- Currie
- Dargavel
- Deloro
- Dempsay
- Denton
- DePencier
- Devitt
- Dokis
- Duff
- Dundonald
- Dunsmore
- Dyer
- Ebbitt
- Ecclestone
- Edwards
- Egan
- Eilber
- Eldorado
- Elliott
- Emerson
- Enid
- Evelyn
- Fauquier
- Fenton
- Fergus
- Findlay
- Fintry
- Fleck
- Ford
- Fortune
- Fournier
- Fox
- Frecheville
- Freele
- Fryatt
- Fushimi
- Gaby
- Galna
- Ganong
- Garden
- Gardiner
- Garrison
- Geary
- Gentles
- German
- Gill
- Glackmeyer
- Godfrey
- Goldwin
- Goodwin
- Gowan
- Greer
- Griffin
- Guibord
- Guilfoyle
- Gurney
- Habel
- Haggart
- Haight
- Hambly
- Hamlet
- Haney
- Hanlan
- Hanna
- Harewood
- Harker
- Harmon
- Heath
- Hecla
- Heighington
- Henderson
- Henlay
- Hepburn
- Hicks
- Hillmer
- Hislop
- Hoblitzell
- Hobson
- Hogg
- Holloway
- Homuth
- Hopkins
- Horden
- Howells
- Hoyle
- Hurdman
- Hurtubise
- Idington
- Inglis
- Ireland
- Irish
- Jamieson
- Jessop
- Keefer
- Kendall
- Kendrey
- Kennedy
- Kenning
- Kerrs
- Kidd
- Kilmer
- Kineras
- Kingsmill
- Kipling
- Kirkland
- Knox
- Kohler
- Laidlaw
- Lamarche
- Lambert
- Lamplugh
- Landry
- Langemarck
- Langmuir
- Laughton
- Leitch
- Lennox
- Lewers
- Lisgar
- Little
- Loveland
- Lowther
- Lucas
- Mabee
- Macdiarmid
- Machin
- Macklem
- Macvicar
- Magladery
- Mahaffy
- Maher
- Mahoney
- Mann
- Marathon
- Marceau
- Marriott
- Marven
- Massey
- Matheson
- Maund
- McAlpine
- McBrien
- McCann
- McCart
- McCausland
- McCoig
- McCool
- McCowan
- McCrea
- McCuaig
- McEvay
- McKnight
- McLeister
- McMillan
- McQuibban
- Melba
- Menapia
- Mewhinney
- Michaud
- Milligan
- Moberly
- Montcalm
- Moody
- Moonbeam
- Moose
- Morrow
- Mortimer
- Mountjoy
- Mowbray
- Mullholland
- Mulloy
- Mulvey
- Munro
- Murphy
- Nansen
- Nassau
- Neely
- Nesbitt
- Nettleton
- Newman
- Newmarket
- Nixon
- Noseworthy
- Nova
- O'Brien
- Ogden
- Oke
- Opasatika
- Ophir
- Orkney
- Ossin
- Ottaway
- Owens
- Parliament
- Parnell
- Parr
- Pearce
- Pickett
- Pinard
- Pitt
- Playfair
- Pliny
- Pontiac
- Potter
- Poulett
- Price
- Prosser
- Purvis
- Pyne
- Rand
- Rapley
- Raven
- Raynar
- Réaume
- Reid
- Rickard
- Ritchie
- Robb
- Roebuck
- Rogers
- Rowlandson
- Rykert
- St. John
- St-Laurent
- Sanborn
- Sanderson
- Sangster
- Sankey
- Sargeant
- Scapa
- Scovil
- Seaton
- Selwyn
- Sequin
- Shackleton
- Shannon
- Shaw
- Shearer
- Sheldon
- Sheraton
- Sherring
- Shetland
- Shuel
- Singer
- Slack
- Stapells
- Staples
- Staunton
- Steele
- Stimson
- Stock
- Stoddart
- Stoughton
- Strachan
- Strickland
- Stringer
- Studholme
- Sulman
- Sutcliffe
- Swanson
- Swartman
- Sweatman
- Sweet
- Sydere
- Syer
- Tannahill
- Taylor
- Teefy
- Teetzel
- Thackeray
- Thomas
- Thorburn
- Thorneloe
- Thorning
- Timmins
- Tisdale
- Tolmie
- Tolstoi
- Tomlinson
- Torrance
- Traill
- Tucker
- Tully
- Turnbull
- Tweed
- Valentine
- Verdun
- Wacousta
- Wadsworth
- Walker
- Warden
- Wark
- Watson
- Way
- Webster
- Weichel
- Wesley
- Whitesides
- Whitney
- Wilhelmina
- Wilkie
- Williamson
- Winnington
- Wright

Current Municipalities

- Black River-Matheson Township
- Town of Cochrane
- Fauquier-Strickland Township
- Town of Hearst
- Town of Iroquois Falls
- Town of Kapuskasing
- Mattice-Val Côté Township
- Moonbeam Township
- Town of Moosonee
- Opasatika Township
- Town of Smooth Rock Falls
- City of Timmins
- Val Rita-Harty Township

Unorganized Areas

- Cochrane, Unorganized, North Part
- Cochrane, Unorganized, South East Part
- Cochrane, Unorganized, South West Part

==== Manitoulin District ====
Manitoulin District in Ontario

Historical/Geographic Townships

- Allan
- Assiginack
- Barrie Island
- Bidwell
- Billings
- Burpee
- Campbell
- Carlyle
- Carnarvon
- Cockburn Island
- Dawson
- Gordon
- Howland
- Humboldt
- Killarney
- Mills
- Robinson
- Rutherford
- Sandfield
- Sheguiandah
- Tehkummah

Current Municipalities

- Assiginack Township
- Billings Township
- Burpee and Mills Township
- Central Manitoulin Township
- Cockburn Island Township
- Gordon/Barrie Island Township
- Town of Gore Bay
- Town of Northeastern Manitoulin and the Islands
- Tehkummah Township

Unorganized Areas

- Manitoulin, Unorganized, West Part

==== Nipissing District ====
Nipissing District in Ontario

Historical/Geographic Townships

- Airy
- Anglin
- Angus
- Antoine
- Askin
- Aston
- Badgerow
- Ballantyne
- Banting
- Barron
- Bastedo
- Beaucage
- Belfast
- Bertram
- Best
- Biggar
- Bishop
- Blyth
- Bonfield
- Boulter
- Bower
- Boyd
- Briggs
- Bronson
- Burnaby
- Butler
- Butt
- Caldwell
- Calvin
- Cameron
- Canisbay
- Canton
- Cassels
- Chambers
- Charlton
- Chisholm
- Clancy
- Clarkson
- Clement
- Commanda
- Crerar
- Cynthia
- Dana
- Deacon
- Devine
- Dickens
- Dickson
- Eddy
- Edgar
- Eldridge
- Falconer
- Fell
- East Ferris
- West Ferris
- Field
- Finlayson
- Fitzgerald
- Flett
- French
- Freswick
- Garrow
- Gibbons
- Gladman
- Gooderham
- Grant
- Guthrie
- Hammell
- Hartle
- Hébert
- Hobbs
- Hugel
- Hunter
- Joan
- Jocko
- Kenny
- Kirkpatrick
- La Salle
- Latchford
- Lauder
- Law
- Le Roche
- Lister
- Lockhart
- Loudon
- Lyell
- Lyman
- MacPherson
- Master
- Mattawan
- McAuslan
- McCallum
- McCraney
- McLaren
- McLaughlin
- McWilliams
- Merrick
- Milne
- Mulock
- Murchison
- Niven
- Notman
- Olive
- Olrig
- Osborne
- Osler
- Papineau
- Pardo
- Parkman
- Paxton
- Peck
- Pedley
- Pentland
- Phelps
- Phyllis
- Poitras
- Preston
- Riddell
- Sabine
- Scholes
- Sisk
- Springer
- Sproule
- Stewart
- Strathcona
- Strathy
- Stratton
- Thistle
- Torrington
- Vogt
- White
- Widdifield
- Wilkes
- Wyse
- Yates

Current Municipalities

- Bonfield Township
- Calvin Township
- Chisholm Township
- East Ferris Township
- Town of Mattawa
- Mattawan Township
- City of North Bay
- Papineau-Cameron Township
- South Algonquin Township
- Town of Temagami
- Town of West Nipissing

Unorganized Areas

- Nipissing, Unorganized, North Part
- Nipissing, Unorganized, South Part

==== Parry Sound District ====
Parry Sound District in Ontario

Historical/Geographic Townships

- Armour
- Bethune
- Blair
- Brown
- Burpee
- Burton
- Carling
- Chapman
- Christie
- Conger
- Cowper
- Croft
- East Mills
- Ferguson
- Ferrie
- Foley
- Gurd
- Hagerman
- Hardy
- Harrison
- Henvey
- North Himsworth
- South Himsworth
- Humphrey
- Joly
- Laurier
- Lount
- Machar
- McConkey
- McDougall
- McKellar
- McKenzie
- McMurrich
- Monteith
- Mowat
- Nipissing
- Patterson
- Perry
- Pringle
- Proudfoot
- Ryerson
- Shawanaga
- Spence
- Strong
- Wallbridge
- Wilson

Current Municipalities

- The Archipelago
- Armour
- Village of Burk's Falls
- Callander
- Carling
- Joly
- Town of Kearney
- Machar Township
- Magnetawan Township
- McDougall Township
- McKellar Township
- McMurrich/Monteith Township
- Nipissing Township
- Town of Parry Sound
- Perry Township
- Town of Powassan
- Ryerson Township
- Seguin Township
- Village of South River
- Strong Township
- Village of Sundridge
- Whitestone

Unorganized Areas

- Laurier Geographic Township (Parry Sound, Unorganized, North East Part)
- Parry Sound, Unorganized, Centre Part

==== Sudbury District ====
Sudbury District in Ontario

Greater Sudbury in Ontario

Historical/Geographic Townships

- Abbey
- Abney
- Acadia
- Acheson
- Addison
- Admiral
- Afton
- Alcona
- Alcorn
- Allen
- Alton
- Amyot
- Antrim
- Appleby
- Arbutus
- Arden
- Armagh
- Asquith
- Athlone
- Attlee
- Awrey
- Aylmer
- Bader
- Baldwin
- Balfour
- Baltic
- Battersby
- Baynes
- Bazett
- Beaumont
- Beckett
- Beemer
- Beilhartz
- Benneweis
- Benton
- Beresford
- Berlin (changed to Kitchener)
- Bernier
- Beulah
- Bevin
- Bigelow
- Biggs
- Bigwood
- Birch
- Biscotasi
- Blackburn
- Blewett
- Blezard
- Bliss
- Bonar
- Bordeleau
- Borden
- Bounsall
- Bowell
- Brackin
- Braithwaite
- Breadner
- Brébeuf
- Broder
- Browning
- Brunswick
- Brutus
- Buckland
- Bullbrook
- Burr
- Burrows
- Burwash
- Busby
- Cabot
- Caen
- Calais
- Caouette
- Capreol
- Carew
- Carruthers
- Carter
- Cartier
- Carton
- Carty
- Cascaden
- Casimir
- Cassidy
- Cavana
- Cavell
- Caverley
- Ceylon
- Chalet
- Champagne
- Chapleau
- Chaplin
- Chappise
- Cherriman
- Chester
- Chewett
- Churchill
- Clary
- Clifton
- Cochrane
- Collins
- Collishaw
- Comox
- Connaught
- Coppell
- Copperfield
- Cortez
- Cosby
- Cosens
- Cotton
- Cox
- Craig
- Creelman
- Creighton
- Crepieul
- Crockett
- Crothers
- Cull
- Cunningham
- Curtin
- Dale
- Dalmas
- Daoust
- D'Arcy
- D'Avaugour
- Davis
- Deans
- De Gaulle
- Delamere
- Delaney
- Delhi
- Delmage
- Demorest
- Denison
- Dennie
- Denyes
- Desrosiers
- Dieppe
- Dill
- Dore
- Dowling
- Drea
- Druillettes
- Drury
- Dryden
- Dublin
- Dukszta
- Dunbar
- Dundee
- Dunlop
- Dunnet
- Dupuis
- Durban
- Earl
- Eaton
- Eden
- Edighoffer
- Edinburgh
- Edith
- Eisenhower
- Elizabeth
- Ellis
- Emerald
- English
- Engstrom
- Eric
- Ermatinger
- Esther
- Ethel
- Evans
- Fairbairn
- Fairbank
- Falconbridge
- Faust
- Fawcett
- Fawn
- Fingal
- Fitzsimmons
- Floranna
- Foleyet
- Foster
- Foy
- Fraleck
- Frater
- Fréchette
- Frey
- Fulton
- Gallagher
- Gamey
- Gardhouse
- Garibaldi
- Garnet
- Garson
- Garvey
- Genier
- Genoa
- Gilbert
- Gilliland
- Gladwin
- Goschen
- Gough
- Gouin
- Graham
- Green
- Greenlaw
- Grigg
- Groves
- Haddo
- Haentschel
- Hagar
- Halcrow
- Halifax
- Hall
- Hallam
- Halliday
- Halsey
- Hammond
- Hancock
- Hanmer
- Hardiman
- Harrow
- Hart
- Hassard
- Hawley
- Hazen
- Heenan
- Hellyer
- Hendrie
- Hennessy
- Henry
- Hess
- Hill
- Hodgetts
- Hoey
- Hollinger
- Hong Kong
- Hornell
- Horwood
- Hoskin
- Howey
- Hubbard
- Huffman
- Hutcheon
- Hutt
- Hutton
- Hyman
- Invergarry
- Inverness
- Iris
- Ivanhoe
- Ivy
- Jack
- Janes
- Jasper
- Jeffries
- Jennings
- Joffre
- Kalen
- Kaplan
- Keith
- Kelly
- Kelsey
- Kelso
- Kelvin
- Kemp
- Kenogaming
- Kilpatrick
- Kitchener
- Kosny
- Lackner
- Lafleche
- Lampman
- Lang
- Langlois
- Laura
- Leask
- Leeson
- Leinster
- Lemoine
- Levack
- Lillie
- Lincoln
- Lipsett
- Lloyd
- Londonderry
- Lorne
- Loughrin
- Louise
- Lynch
- MacBeth
- Mackelcan
- Maclennan
- MacMurchy
- Mageau
- Mallard
- Manning
- Marconi
- Margaret
- Marion
- Marquette
- Marsh
- Marshall
- Marshay
- Martland
- Mason
- Mattagami
- May
- McBride
- McCarthy
- McConnell
- McGee
- McKim
- McKinnon
- McLeod
- McNamara
- McNaught
- McNish
- McOwen
- McPhail
- Melrose
- Merritt
- Middleton
- Miramichi
- Missinaibi
- Moen
- Moffat
- Moggy
- Moher
- Mond
- Moncrieff
- Mongowin
- Morgan
- Morse
- Moses
- Mountbatten
- Muldrew
- Munster
- Murdock
- Muskego
- Nairn
- Natal
- Neelands
- Neill
- Neville
- Newton
- Nimitz
- Noble
- Norman
- Northrup
- Nursey
- Oates
- Ogilvie
- Onaping
- Oswald
- Osway
- Panet
- Parker
- Parkin
- Patenaude
- Pattinson
- Paudush
- Paul
- Penhorwood
- Peters
- Pinogrami
- Porter
- Potier
- Racine
- Ramsden
- Raney
- Rathbun
- Ratter and Dunnet
- Rayside
- Reaney
- Reeves
- Regan
- Rennie
- Rhodes
- Roberts
- Roblin
- Rollo
- Roosevelt
- Sadler
- St-Louis
- Sale
- Salter
- Sandy
- Scadding
- Schembri
- Scollard
- Scotia
- Scriven
- Seagram
- Scord
- Selby
- Selkirk
- Semple
- Servos
- Sewell
- Shakespeare
- Sheard
- Shelburne
- Shelley
- Shenango
- Sheppard
- Sherlock
- Sherratt
- Shibananing
- Shipley
- Silk
- Singapore
- Sladen
- Smuts
- Snider
- Solski
- Somme
- Sothman
- Spanish River
- Specht
- Stalin (renamed Hansen in 1986)
- Stetham
- Stobie
- Stover
- Stralak
- Strathearn
- Street
- Strom
- Struthers
- Stull
- Swayze
- Sweeny
- Symington
- Teasdale
- Telfer
- Tilton
- Tofflemire
- Togo
- Tooms
- Topham
- Totten
- Travers
- Trill
- Triquet
- Truman
- Turner
- Tyrone
- Ulster
- Unwin
- Valley East
- Valin
- Venturi
- Vernon
- Victoria
- Vondette
- Vrooman
- Wakami
- Waldie
- Warren
- Waters
- Weeks
- Westbrook
- Whalen
- Wigham
- Whitehead
- Wigle
- Windego
- Wisner
- Yeo
- Zavitz

Current Municipalities

- Regional Municipality of Sudbury
  - Greater Sudbury (single-tier municipality)
- Sudbury District
  - Baldwin Township
  - Chapleau Township
  - Town of Espanola
  - Town of French River
  - Municipality of Killarney
  - Town of Markstay-Warren
  - Nairn and Hyman Township
  - Sables-Spanish Rivers Township
  - Town of St. Charles

Unorganized Areas

- Sudbury, Unorganized, North Part

==== Timiskaming District ====
Timiskaming District in Ontario

Historical/Geographic Townships

- Alma
- Argyle
- Armstrong
- Arnold
- Auld
- Baden
- Banks
- Bannockburn
- Barber
- Barr
- Bartlett
- Bayly
- Beauchamp
- Bernhardt
- Blain
- Bompas
- Boston
- Brethour
- Brewster
- Brigstocke
- Bryce
- Bucke
- Burt
- Cairo
- Cane
- Casey
- Catharine
- Chamberlain
- Charters
- Childerhose
- Chown
- Cleaver
- Cole
- Coleman
- Corkill
- Corley
- Dack
- Dane
- Davidson
- Donovan
- Doon
- Douglas
- Doyle
- Dufferin
- Dunmore
- Dymond
- Eby
- Evanturel
- Fallon
- Farr
- Fasken
- Firstbrook
- Flavelle
- Fripp
- Gamble
- Gauthier
- Geikie
- Gillies Limit
- Grenfell
- Gross
- Harley
- Harris
- Haultain
- Hearst
- Henwood
- Hillary
- Hilliard
- Hincks
- Holmes
- Hudson
- Ingram
- James
- Katrine
- Kerns
- Kimberley
- Kittson
- Klock
- Knight
- Lawson
- Lebel
- Leckie
- Lee
- Leith
- Leo
- Leonard
- Lorrain
- South Lorrain
- Lundy
- Maisonville
- Marquis
- Marter
- McArthur
- McElroy
- McFadden
- McGarry
- McGiffin
- McKeown
- McNeil
- McVittie
- Medina
- Michie
- Mickle
- Midlothian
- Milner
- Montrose
- Morel
- Morrisette
- Mulligan
- Musgrove
- Nicol
- Nordica
- Ossian
- Otto
- Pacaud
- Pense
- Pharand
- Powell
- Rankin
- Rattray
- Ray
- Raymond
- Reynolds
- Roadhouse
- Robertson
- Robillard
- Rorke
- Savard
- Sharpe
- Sheba
- Shillington
- Skead
- Smyth
- Speight
- Teck
- Terry
- Trethewey
- Truax
- Tudhope
- Tyrrell
- Van Hise
- Van Nostrand
- Wallis
- Whitson
- Willet
- North Williams
- Willison
- Yarrow

Current Municipalities

- Armstrong Township
- Brethour Township
- Casey Township
- Chamberlain Township
- Charlton and Dack Township
- Town of Cobalt
- Coleman Township
- Town of Englehart
- Evanturel Township
- Gauthier Township
- Harley Township
- Harris Township
- Hilliard Township
- Hudson Township
- James Township
- Kerns Township
- Town of Kirkland Lake
- Larder Lake Township
- Town of Latchford
- Matachewan Township
- McGarry Township
- City of Temiskaming Shores
- Village of Thornloe

Unorganized Areas

- Timiskaming, Unorganized, East Part
- Timiskaming, Unorganized, West Part

==== Muskoka District Municipality ====
Muskoka County in Ontario

Historical/Geographic Townships

- Baxter
- Brunel
- Cardwell
- Chaffey
- Draper
- Franklin
- Freeman
- Gibson
- Macaulay
- McLean
- Medora
- Monck
- Morrison
- Muskoka
- Oakley
- Ridout
- Ryde
- Sinclair
- Stephenson
- Stisted
- Watt
- Wood

Current Municipalities

- Town of Bracebridge
- Georgian Bay Township
- Town of Gravenhurst
- Town of Huntsville
- Lake of Bays Township
- Muskoka Lakes Township

=== Northwestern Ontario ===
==== Kenora District ====
Kenora District in Ontario

Historical/Geographic Townships

- Agnes
- Agnew
- Aubrey
- Avery
- Baird
- Ball
- Balmer
- Barclay
- Barrett
- Bateman
- Belanger
- Benedickson
- Big Island
- Birkett
- Block No. 7
- Block No. 8
- Block No. 9
- Block No. 10
- Bowerman
- Boys
- Bradshaw
- Breithaupt
- Bridges
- Britton
- Broderick
- Brownridge
- Buller
- Burk
- Byshe
- Cathcart
- Cartrand
- Code
- Colenso
- Connell
- Corless
- Corman
- Costello
- Coyle
- Daniel
- Dent
- Desmond
- Devonshire
- Dewan
- Docker
- Dome
- Drayton
- Drope
- Ear Falls
- Earngey
- Echo
- Eton
- Ewart
- Factor
- Fairlie
- Forgie
- Furniss
- Gidley
- Glass
- Godson
- Golden
- Graves
- Goodall
- Gour
- Grummett
- Gundy
- Hartman
- Haycock
- Heyson
- Hodgson
- Honeywell
- Hyndman
- Ignace
- IIsley
- Jackman
- Jaffray
- Jordon
- Killala
- Kirkup
- Knot
- Ladysmith
- Langton
- Laval
- Lomond
- Le May
- MacFie
- MacNichol
- MacQuarrie
- Mafeking
- Malachi
- Manross
- McAree
- McCullagh
- McDonough
- McGeorge
- McIlraith
- McMeekin
- McNaughton
- McNevin
- Melgund
- Melick
- Mitchell
- Mulcahy
- Mutrie
- Norman
- Noyon
- Osaquan
- Pelican
- Pellatt
- Pettypiece
- Phillips
- Pickerel
- Ponsford
- Ranger
- Reddit
- Red Lake
- Redvers
- Revell
- Rice
- Rowell
- Rudd
- Rugby
- Sanford
- Satterly
- Shaver
- Sioux Lookout
- Sioux Narrows
- Skey
- Skimmer
- Slaight
- Smellie
- Southworth
- Stokes
- Temple
- Todd
- Tustin
- Tweedsmuir
- Umbach
- Van Horne
- Vermillion
- Wabigoon
- Wainwright
- Wauchope
- Webb
- Willans
- Willingdon
- Work
- Zealand

Current Municipalities

- City of Dryden, Ontario
- Ear Falls Township
- Ignace Township
- City of Kenora
- Machin
- Pickle Lake
- Town of Red Lake
- Sioux Narrows-Nestor Falls Township
- Town of Sioux Lookout

Unorganized Areas

- Kenora, Unorganized

==== Rainy River District ====
Rainy River District in Ontario

Historical/Geographic Townships

- Alberton
- Asmussen
- Atikokan
- Atwood
- Alysworth
- Baker
- Barwick
- Bennett
- Blue
- Burriss
- Carpenter
- Chapple
- Claxton
- Croome
- Crozier
- Curran
- Dance
- Devlin
- Dewart
- Dilke
- Dobie
- Emo
- Farrington
- Fleming
- Fort Frances
- Freeborn
- Griesinger
- Halkirk
- Hutchinson
- Kingsford
- La Vallée
- Lash
- Mather
- Mathieu
- McCaul
- McCrosson
- McCrosson & Tovell
- McIrvine
- McLarty
- Menary
- Miscampbell
- Morley
- Morley Additional
- Morson
- Nelles
- Pattullo
- Potts
- Pratt
- Rainy River
- Ramsay Wright
- Richardson
- Roddick
- Roseberry
- Rowe
- Schwenger
- Senn
- Shenston
- Sifton
- Spohn
- Sutherland
- Tait
- Tanner
- Tovell
- Trottier
- Watten
- Weaver
- Wild Land Reserve
- Woodyatt
- Worthington

Current Municipalities

- Alberton Township
- Atikokan Township
- Chapple Township
- Dawson Township
- Emo Township
- Town of Fort Frances
- La Vallee Township
- Lake of the Woods Township
- Morley Township
- Town of Rainy River

Unorganized Areas

- Rainy River, Unorganized

==== Thunder Bay District ====
Thunder Bay District in Ontario

Historical/Geographic Townships

- Abrey
- Adamson
- Adrian
- Aldina
- Alpha
- Ames
- Ashmore
- Atikameg
- Bain
- Barbara
- Beardmore
- Bégin
- Bell
- Benner
- Bertrand
- Bickle
- Blackwell
- Blake
- Block No. 1
- Block No. 2
- Block No. 3
- Block No. 4
- Block No. 5
- Block No. 6
- Block No. 7
- Bomby
- Booth
- Boucher
- Brothers
- Bryant
- Bulmer
- Byron
- Cecil
- Cecile
- Chevrier
- Church
- Cockeram
- Coldwell
- Colliver
- Colter
- Coltham
- Conacher
- Conant
- Conmee
- Corrigal
- Cotte
- Croll
- Crooks
- Daley
- Danford
- Davies
- Devon
- Dorion
- Dorothea
- Duckworth
- Dye
- Elmhirst
- Errington
- Esnagami
- Eva
- Exton
- Fallis
- Fauteux
- Fernow
- Fletcher
- Flood
- Foote
- Forbes
- Fowler
- Fraleigh
- Fulford
- Furlonge
- Gemmell
- Gertrude
- Gibbard
- Gillies
- Glen
- Goldie
- Golding
- Goodfellow
- Gorham
- Goulet
- Grain
- Graydon
- Grenville
- Gzowski
- Hagey
- Haines
- Hanniwell
- Hardwick
- Hartington
- Heathcote
- Hele
- Herbert
- Hipel
- Hogarth
- Homer
- Horne
- Houck
- Innes
- Inwood
- Irwin
- Jacques
- Jean
- Joynt
- Jutten
- Kilkenny
- Killraine
- Kirby
- Kitto
- Klots
- Knowles
- Kowkash
- Laberge
- Lahontan
- Lamport
- Langworthy
- Lapierre
- Laurie
- Lecours
- Ledger
- Leduc
- Legault
- Leslie
- Lett
- Lindsley
- Lismore
- Longlac
- Low
- Lybster
- Lyon
- MacGregor
- Manion
- Manitouwadge
- Mapledoram
- Marks
- McAllister
- McComber
- McCoy
- McCron
- McCubbin
- McGill
- McGillis
- McIntyre
- McIvor
- McKelvie
- McLaurin
- McMaster
- McQueston
- McTavish
- Meader
- Meinsinger
- Michener
- Mikano
- Moss
- Nakina
- Neebing
- Nickle
- Nipigon
- O'Connor
- O'Meara
- O'Neill
- Oakes
- Oboshkegan
- Oliver
- Paipoonge
- Pardee
- Parent
- Parry
- Patience
- Patrick
- Pearson
- Pic
- Pifher
- Poisson
- Priske
- Purdom
- Pyramid
- Red Rock
- Rickaby
- Robbins
- Roberta
- Robson
- Rupert
- Sackville
- Salsberg
- Sandra
- Savanne
- Savant
- Schreiber
- Scoble
- Shabotik
- Shibley
- Shuniah
- Sibley
- Smye
- Soper
- Spooner
- Stedham
- Stirling
- Strange
- Strey
- Summers
- Suni
- Syine
- Terrace Bay
- Trewartha
- Tuuri
- Upsala
- Vincent
- Vivian
- Walsh
- Walters
- Wardrope
- Ware
- Wiggins
- Yesno

Current Municipalities

- City of Thunder Bay
- Conmee Township
- Dorion Township
- Gillies Township
- Municipality of Greenstone
- Manitouwadge Township
- Town of Marathon
- Municipality of Neebing
- Nipigon Township
- O'Connor Township
- Municipality of Oliver Paipoonge
- Red Rock Township
- Schreiber Township
- Shuniah Township
- Terrace Bay Township

Unorganized Areas

- Thunder Bay, Unorganized

== Southern Ontario ==
=== Central Ontario ===
==== Dufferin County ====
Dufferin County in Ontario

Historical Townships

- Amaranth
- East Garafraxa
- East Luther
- Melancthon
- Mono
- Mulmur

Current Municipalities

- Amaranth Township
- East Garafraxa Township
- East Luther-Grand Valley Township
- Melancthon Township
- Town of Mono
- Mulmur Township
- Town of Orangeville
- Town of Shelburne

==== Haliburton County ====
Haliburton County in Ontario

Historical/Geographic Townships

- Anson
- Bruton
- Cardiff
- Clyde
- Dudley
- Dysart
- Eyre
- Glanmorgan
- Guilford
- Harburn
- Harcourt
- Havelock
- Hindon
- Lawrence
- Livingstone
- Lutterworth
- McClintock
- Minden
- Monmouth
- Nightingale
- Sherborone
- Snowdon
- Stanhope

Current Municipalities

- Algonquin Highlands Township
- Municipality of Dysart et al. (Dysart, Bruton, Clyde, Dudley, Eyre, Guilford, Harburn, Harcourt and Havelock)
- Highlands East Township
- Minden Hills

==== Hastings County ====
Hastings County in Ontario

Historical/Geographic Townships

- Bangor
- Carlow
- Cashel
- Dungannon
- Elzevir
- Faraday
- Grimsthorpe
- Herschel
- Hungerford
- Huntingdon
- Lake
- Limerick
- Madoc
- Marmora
- Mayo
- McClure
- Monteagle
- Rawdon
- Sidney
- Thurlow
- Tudor
- Tyendinaga
- Wicklow
- Wollaston

Current Municipalities

- Town of Bancroft
- Town of Deseronto
- Carlow/Mayo Township
- Municipality of Centre Hastings
- Faraday Township
- Municipality of Hastings Highlands
- Limerick Township
- Madoc Township
- Marmora and Lake Township
- Stirling-Rawdon Township
- Tudor and Cashel Township
- Municipality of Tweed
- Tyendinaga Township
- Wollaston Township

==== Northumberland County ====
Northumberland County in Ontario

Historical Townships

- Alnwick
- Brighton
- Cramahe
- Haldimand
- Hamilton
- Murray
- Percy
- Seymour
- South Monaghan

Current Municipalities

- Alnwick/Haldimand
- Municipality of Brighton
- Town of Cobourg
- Cramahe Township
- Hamilton Township
- Municipality of Port Hope
- Municipality of Trent Hills

==== Peterborough County ====
Peterborough County in Ontario

Historical Townships

- Anstruther
- Asphodel
- Belmont
- Burleigh
- Cavendish
- Chandos
- Dummer
- Douro
- Ennismore
- Galway
- Harvey
- Methuen
- North Monaghan
- Otonabee
- Smith

Current Municipalities

- Asphodel-Norwood
- Cavan-Monaghan
- Douro-Dummer
- Havelock-Belmont-Methuen
- North Kawartha
- Otonabee-South Monaghan
- Selwyn (formerly Smith-Ennismore-Lakefield)
- Trent Lakes (formerly Galway-Cavendish and Harvey)

==== Simcoe County ====
Simcoe County in Ontario

Historical Townships

- Adjala
- Artemesia
- Collingwood
- Essa
- Flos
- West Gwillimbury
- Innisfil
- Mara (from Ontario County)
- Matchedash
- Medonte
- Mono (transferred to Dufferin County
- Mulmur (transferred to Dufferin County)
- Nottawasaga
- Osprey
- Oro
- North Orillia
- South Orillia
- Rama (from Ontario County)
- St. Vincent (transferred to Grey County)
- Sunnidale
- Tay
- Tecumseth
- Tiny
- Tosorontio
- Uphrasia
- Vespra

Current Municipalities

- Adjala-Tosorontio Township
- Town of Bradford-West Gwillimbury
- Clearview Township
- Town of Collingwood
- Essa Township
- Town of Innisfil
- Town of Midland
- Town of New Tecumseth
- Oro-Medonte Township
- Town of Penetanguishene
- Ramara Township
- Severn Township
- Springwater Township
- Tay Township
- Tiny Township
- Town of Wasaga Beach

==== City of Kawartha Lakes ====
Kawartha Lakes in Ontario

Historical Townships

- Victoria County
  - Bexley
  - Carden
  - Dalton
  - Eldon
  - Emily
  - Fenelon
  - Laxton, Digby and Longford
    - Digby
    - Laxton
    - Longford
  - Manvers (from Durham County)
  - Mariposa
  - Ops
  - Somerville
  - Verulam

Current Municipality

- City of Kawartha Lakes (Single-tier municipality)

==== Prince Edward County ====
Prince Edward County in Ontario

Historical Townships

- Ameliasburgh
- Athol
- Bloomfield
- Hallowell
- Hillier
- North Marysburgh
- South Marysburgh
- Sophiasburgh
- Picton
- Wellington

Current Municipality

- Prince Edward County (Single-tier municipality)

=== Eastern Ontario ===
==== Frontenac County ====
Frontenac County in Ontario

Historical Townships

- Barrie
- Bedford
- North Canonto
- South Canonto
- Clarendon
- Kennebec
- Hinchinbrooke
- Howe Island
- Kingston
- Loughborough
- Miller
- Olden
- Oso
- Palmerston
- Pittsburgh
- Portland
- Storrington
- Wolfe Island

Current Municipalities

- Central Frontenac Township
- North Frontenac Township
- South Frontenac Township
- Frontenac Islands Township

==== Lanark County ====
Lanark County in Ontario

Historical Townships

- Bathurst
- Beckwith
- North Burgess
- Dalhousie
- Darling
- Drummond
- North Elmsley
- Lanark
- Lavant
- Montague
- Pakenham
- Ramsay
- North Sherbooke
- South Sherbrooke

Current Municipalities

- Beckwith Township
- Town of Carleton Place
- Drummond/North Elmsley Township
- Lanark Highlands Township
- Town of Mississippi Mills
- Montague Township
- Town of Perth
- Tay Valley Township

==== Leeds and Grenville United Counties ====
Leeds and Grenville United Counties in Ontario

Historical townships

- Leeds County
  - Bastard
  - South Burgess
  - North Crosby
  - South Crosby
  - Elizabethtown
  - South Elmsley
  - Front of Escott
  - Front of Leeds and Lansdowne
  - Front of Yonge
  - Kitley
  - Rear of Leeds and Lansdowne
- Grenville County
  - Augusta
  - Edwardsburgh
  - South Gower
  - Oxford
  - Wolford

Current Municipalities

- Athens Township
- Augusta Township
- Edwardsburgh/Cardinal Township
- Elizabethtown-Kitley Township
- Front of Yonge Township
- Leeds and the Thousand Islands Township
- Village of Merrickville-Wolford
- North Grenville Township
- Rideau Lakes Township
- Village of Westport

==== Lennox and Addington County ====
Lennox and Addington County in Ontario

Historical Townships

- Lennox County
  - Adolphustown
  - North Fredericksburgh
  - South Fredericksburgh
  - Richmond
- Addington County
  - Abinger
  - Amherst Island
  - Anglesea
  - Ashby
  - Camden East
  - Denbigh
  - Effingham
  - Ernestown
  - Kaladar
  - Sheffield

Current Municipalities

- Addington Highlands Township
- Town of Greater Napanee
- Loyalist Township
- Stone Mills Township

==== Prescott and Russell United Counties ====
Prescott and Russell United Counties in Ontario

Historical Townships/Municipalities

- Prescott County
  - Alfred
  - Caledonia
  - East Hawkesbury
  - West Hawkesbury
  - Longueuil
  - North Plantagenet
  - South Plantagenet
- Russell County
  - Cambridge
  - Clarence
  - Cumberland (transferred to Carleton County)
  - Russell

Current Municipalities

- Alfred and Plantagenet Township
- Municipality of Casselman
- Champlain Township
- City of Clarence-Rockland
- East Hawkesbury Township
- Town of Hawkesbury
- Russell Township
- Municipality of The Nation

==== Renfrew County ====
Renfrew County in Ontario

Historical Townships

- Admaston
- Alice
- North Algona
- South Algona
- Bagot
- Blythfield
- Bromley
- Brougham
- Brudenell
- Buchanan
- Burns
- Clara
- Fraser
- Grattan
- Griffith
- Hagarty
- Head
- Horton
- Jones
- Lyndoch
- Maria
- Matawatchan
- McKay
- McNab
- Pembroke
- Petawawa
- Radcliffe
- Raglan
- Richards
- Rolph
- Ross
- Sebastopol
- Sherwood
- Stafford
- Westmeath
- Wilberforce
- Wylie

Current Municipalities

- Admaston/Bromley Township
- Town of Arnprior
- Bonnechere Valley Township
- Brudenell, Lyndoch and Raglan Township
- Town of Deep River
- Greater Madawaska Township
- Head, Clara and Maria Township
- Horton Township
- Killaloe, Hagarty and Richards Township
- Town of Laurentian Hills
- Laurentian Valley Township
- Madawaska Valley Township
- McNab/Braeside Township
- North Algona Wilberforce
- Town of Petawawa
- Town of Renfrew
- Whitewater Region Township

==== Stormont, Dundas and Glengarry United Counties ====
Stormont, Dundas and Glengarry United Counties in Ontario

Historical Townships

- Dundas County
  - Matilda
  - Mountain
  - Williamsburgh
  - Winchester
- Glengarry County
  - Charlottenburgh
  - Kenyon
  - Lancaster
  - Lochiel
- Stormont County
  - Cornwall
  - Finch
  - Osnabruck
  - Roxborough

Current Municipalities

- City of Cornwall
- North Dundas Township
- South Dundas Municipality
- North Glengarry Township
- South Glengarry Township
- North Stormont Township
- South Stormont Township

==== City of Ottawa ====
City of Ottawa in Ontario

Historical Townships

- Carleton County
  - Fitzroy
  - Gloucester
  - Goulbourn
  - North Gower
  - Huntley
  - March
  - Marlborough
  - Nepean
  - Osgoode
  - Torbolton

Current Municipality

- City of Ottawa (Single-tier municipality)

=== Golden Horseshoe ===
==== Regional Municipality of Durham ====
Durham Region in Ontario

Historical Townships

- Durham County
  - Cartwright
  - Cavan (transferred to Peterborough County)
  - Clarke
  - Darlington
  - Hope (transferred to Northumberland County)
  - Manvers (transferred to Victoria County)
- Ontario County
  - Brock
  - Mara (transferred to Simcoe County)
  - Pickering
  - Rama (transferred to Simcoe County)
  - Reach
  - Scott
  - Scugog
  - Thorah
  - Uxbridge
  - Whitby
  - East Whitby

Current Municipalities

- Town of Ajax
- Brock Township
- Municipality of Clarington
- City of Oshawa
- City of Pickering
- Scugog Township
- Uxbridge Township
- Town of Whitby

==== Regional Municipality of Halton ====
Halton Region in Ontario

Historical Townships

- Halton County
  - Esquesing
  - Nassagaweya
  - Nelson
  - Trafalgar

Current Municipalities

- City of Burlington
- Town of Halton Hills
- Town of Milton
- Town of Oakville

==== Regional Municipality of Niagara ====
Niagara Region in Ontario

Historical Townships

- Lincoln County
  - Caistor
  - Clinton
  - Gainsborough
  - Grantham
  - Grimsby
  - Louth
  - Niagara
- Welland County
  - Bertie
  - Crowland
  - Humberstone
  - Pelham
  - Thorold
  - Stamford
  - Wainfleet
  - Willoughby

Current Municipalities

- Town of Fort Erie
- Town of Grimsby
- Town of Lincoln
- City of Niagara Falls
- Town of Niagara-on-the-Lake
- Town of Pelham
- City of Port Colborne
- City of St. Catharines
- City of Thorold
- Wainfleet Township
- City of Welland
- West Lincoln Township

==== Regional Municipality of Peel ====
Peel Region in Ontario

Historical Townships

- Peel County
  - Albion
  - Caledon
  - Chinguacousy
  - Toronto
  - Toronto Gore

Current Municipalities

- City of Brampton
- Town of Caledon
- City of Mississauga

==== Regional Municipality of York ====
York Region in Ontario

The section of York County north of Metro Toronto eventually became the Regional Municipality of York, and York County was dissolved.

Historical Townships

- Georgina
- East Gwillimbury
- North Gwillimbury
- King
- Markham
- Vaughan
- Whitchurch

Current Municipalities

- Town of Aurora
- Town of East Gwillimbury
- Town of Georgina
- King Township
- City of Markham
- Town of Newmarket
- City of Richmond Hill
- City of Vaughan
- Town of Whitchurch-Stouffville

==== City of Hamilton ====
City of Hamilton in Ontario

Historical Townships

- Wentworth County
  - Ancaster
  - Barton
  - Beverley
  - Binbrook
  - Caistor
  - Flamborough East
  - Flamborough West
  - Glanford
  - Onondaga
  - Saltfleet
  - Seneca

Current Municipality

- City of Hamilton (Single-tier municipality)

==== York County and Metropolitan Toronto ====
Historical Townships

- East York
- Etobicoke
- Scarborough
- York

In 1953, York Country was split. Metropolitan Toronto was formed by severing from York County:

- East York Township
- Etobicoke Township
- North York Township
- Scarborough Township
- Toronto (pre-amalgamation)

and several small municipalities:

- Forest Hill
- Leaside
- Long Branch
- Mimico
- New Toronto
- Swansea
- Weston

These were dissolved in 1967 into the townships, which became boroughs.

Metro Toronto was amalgamated in 1998 into:

- City of Toronto (Single-tier municipality, not a part of present York Region)

=== Southwestern Ontario ===
==== Bruce County ====
Bruce County in Ontario

Historical Townships

- Albemarle
- Amabel
- Arran
- Brant
- Bruce
- Carrick
- Culross
- Eastnor
- Elderslie
- Greenock
- Huron
- Kincardine
- Kinloss
- Lindsay
- St. Edmund's
- Saugeen

Current Municipalities

- Municipality of Arran-Elderslie
- Municipality of Brockton
- Huron-Kinloss Township
- Municipality of Kincardine
- Municipality of Northern Bruce Peninsula
- Town of Saugeen Shores
- Municipality of South Bruce
- Town of South Bruce Peninsula

==== Elgin County ====
Elgin County in Ontario

Historical Townships

- Aldborough
- Bayham
- South Dorchester
- Dunwich
- Malahide
- Southwold
- Yarmouth

Current Municipalities

- Town of Aylmer
- Municipality of Bayham
- Municipality of Central Elgin
- Municipality of Dutton/Dunwich
- Municipality of West Elgin
- Malahide Township
- Southwold Township

==== Essex County ====
Essex County in Ontario

Historical Townships

- Anderdon
- Colchester North
- Colchester South
- Gosfield North
- Gosfield South
- Maidstone
- Malden
- Mersea
- Rochester
- Sandwich East
- Sandwich South
- Sandwich West
- Tilbury North
- Tilbury West

Current Municipalities

- Town of Amherstburg
- Town of Essex
- Town of Kingsville
- Town of Lakeshore
- Town of LaSalle
- Town of Tecumseh
- Town of Leamington
- Pelee Township

==== Grey County ====
Grey County in Ontario

Historical Townships

- Artemesia
- Bentinck
- Collingwood
- Derby
- Egremont
- Euphrasia
- Glenelg
- Keppel
- Holland
- Normanby
- Osprey
- Proton
- St. Vincent
- Sarawak
- Sullivan
- Sydenham

Current Municipalities

- Town of The Blue Mountains
- Chatsworth Township
- Georgian Bluffs Township
- Municipality of Grey Highlands
- Town of Hanover
- Municipality of Meaford
- City of Owen Sound
- Southgate Township
- Municipality of West Grey

==== Huron County ====
Huron County in Ontario

Historical Townships

- Ashfield
- Colborne
- Goderich
- Grey
- Hay
- Howick
- Hullett
- McKillop
- Morris
- Stanley
- Stephen
- Tuckersmith
- Turnberry
- Usborne
- East Wawanosh
- West Wawanosh

Current Municipalities

- Ashfield-Colborne-Wawanosh Township
- Municipality of Bluewater
- Central Huron Township
- Howick Township
- Municipality of Huron East
- Municipality of Morris-Turnberry
- North Huron Township
- South Huron Township

==== Lambton County ====
Lambton County in Ontario

Historical Townships

- Bosanquet
- Brooke
- Dawn
- Enniskillen
- Euphemia
- Moore
- Plympton
- Sarnia
- Sombra
- Warwick

Current Municipalities

- Brooke-Alvinston
- Dawn-Euphemia
- Enniskillen
- Municipality of Lambton Shores
- Village of Oil Springs
- Town of Petrolia
- Town of Plympton-Wyoming
- Village of Point Edward
- St. Clair Township
- City of Sarnia
- Warwick Township

==== Middlesex County ====
Middlesex County in Ontario

Historical Townships

- Adelaide
- Biddulph
- Caradoc
- Delaware
- North Dorchester
- Ekfrid
- Lobo
- London
- McGillivray
- Metcalfe
- Mosa
- West Nissouri
- Westminster
- East Williams
- West Williams

Current Municipalities

- Adelaide Metcalfe Township
- Lucan Biddulph Township
- Middlesex Centre Township
- Village of Newbury
- North Middlesex Township
- Southwest Middlesex Township
- Strathroy-Caradoc Township
- Municipality of Thames Centre

==== Perth County ====
Perth County in Ontario

Historical Townships

- Blanshard
- Downie
- North Easthope
- South Easthope
- Ellice
- Elma
- Fullarton
- Hibbert
- Logan
- Mornington
- Wallace

Current Municipalities

- Town of North Perth
- Perth East Township
- Perth South Township
- West Perth Township

==== Wellington County ====
Wellington County in Ontario

Historical Townships

- Arthur
- Eramosa
- Erin
- West Garafraxa
- Guelph
- West Luther
- Maryborough
- Minto
- Nichol
- Peel
- Pilkington
- Puslinch

Current Municipalities

- Centre Wellington Township
- Town of Erin
- Guelph/Eramosa Township
- Mapleton Township
- Town of Minto
- Puslinch Township
- Wellington North Township

==== Oxford County ====
Oxford County in Ontario

Historical Townships

- Blandford
- Blenheim
- Dereham
- East Nissouri
- North Norwich
- South Norwich
- East Oxford
- North Oxford
- West Oxford
- East Zorra
- West Zorra

Current Municipalities

- Blandford-Blenheim Township
- East Zorra-Tavistock Township
- Town of Ingersoll
- Norwich
- South-West Oxford
- Town of Tillsonburg
- City of Woodstock
- Zorra

==== Regional Municipality of Waterloo ====
Waterloo Region in Ontario

Historical Townships

- Waterloo County
  - North Dumfries
  - Waterloo
  - Wellesley
  - Wilmot
  - Woolwich

Current Municipalities

- City of Cambridge
- City of Kitchener
- North Dumfries Township
- City of Waterloo
- Wellesley Township
- Wilmot Township
- Woolwich Township

==== Brant County ====
Brant County in Ontario

Historical Townships

- Brantford
- Burford
- South Dumfries
- Oakland
- Onondaga
- Tuscarora

Current Municipality

- County of Brant (single-tier municipality)

==== Municipality of Chatham-Kent ====
Chatham-Kent in Ontario

Historical Townships

- Kent County
  - Camden
  - Chatham
  - Dover
  - Harwich
  - Howard
  - Orford
  - Raleigh
  - Romney
  - Tilbury East
  - Zone

Current Municipality

- Municipality of Chatham-Kent (Single-tier municipality)

==== Haldimand County ====
Haldimand County in Ontario

Historical Townships

- Canborough
- North Cayuga
- South Cayuga
- Dunn
- Moulton
- Oneida
- Rainham
- Seneca
- Sherbrooke
- Walpole

Current Municipality

- Haldimand County (Single-tier municipality)

==== Norfolk County ====
Norfolk County in Ontario

Historical Townships

- Charlotteville
- Houghton
- Middleton
- Townsend
- North Walsingham
- South Walsingham
- Windham
- Woodhouse

Current Municipality

- Norfolk County (Single-tier municipality)

== See also ==
- List of township municipalities in Ontario
