= Rosedale, Ontario =

Rosedale
- Dispersed Rural Community
- Etymology: Named for settler Rosa Dale
- Location in Southern Ontario
- Coordinates: 44°34′28″N 78°47′42″W
- Country: Canada
- Province: Ontario
- Municipality: Kawartha Lakes
- Elevation: 260 m (850 ft)
- Time zone: UTC-5 (Eastern Time Zone)
  - Summer (DST): UTC-4 (Eastern Time Zone)
- Postal code: K0M 1N0
- Area codes: 705, 249

Rosedale is a Dispersed Rural Community and unincorporated place located in the city of Kawartha Lakes, Ontario, Canada, 29 kilometres (18 mi) north-west of Lindsay. It is partly in geographic Fenelon Township and partly in Somerville Township, and is on the Rosedale River, part of the Trent–Severn Waterway, where that river drains Balsam Lake on its way to Cameron Lake.

Trent–Severn Waterway Lock 35 "Rosedale", completed in 1873 thus allowing boats to traverse between Cameron and Balsam Lakes, is on the Rosedale River just east of the community, and Ontario Highway 35 crosses over the river at Rosedale.

Rosedale was for a time named Rosa Dale, after the wife of settler John Cameron, who first settled the area now known as Fenelon Falls

The population of Rosedale is roughly 500.

== Facts and figures ==
- Rosedale celebrated the First Annual "National Marina Day" on August 13, 2005, with events at the local Rosedale Marina.
- In 2001, Rosedale played host to part of an episode of the OLN Reality Series "Drifters: The Water Wars" as they passed through the Trent-Severn Waterway.
