= Bexley Township =

Former township in southern Ontario, Canada

Coordinates: 44°36′N 78°52′W

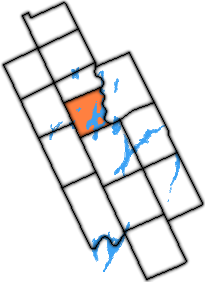
Bexley Township within former Victoria County

The Township of Bexley (Population 1305 c.1996) was a municipality located in the northern half of the former Victoria County, now the city of Kawartha Lakes, in the Canadian province of Ontario.

== History ==
Bexley's history can be traced back to Indian villages established at the end of the Portage Road, a long historic trail that ended at the site of St. Mary's, on the western shore of Balsam Lake's West Bay. The villages flourished and faded for at least a century prior to the arrival of Samuel de Champlain on his tour with the Hurons. Various tribes used the site up until 1760, when English fur traders established a trading post at the site.

Victoria County was opened to settlement in 1821, but Bexley remained unchanged for over a decade due to its northern position within the county, which meant it was surveyed at some point in the early 1830s. The first settler was Admiral Vansittart, who was given a grant of one thousand acres (4 km^{2}) of land on the west shores of Balsam Lake in 1834. His cousin, Nicholas Vansittart, Chancellor of the Exchequer - known commonly as Lord or Baron Bexley - was a colleague of John Scott, 1st Earl of Eldon, after whom Eldon Township is named. Bexley's principal population centre - Coboconk - was founded in 1851 and continues to thrive off summer tourism from recreational cottagers.

== Geography ==
According to the 1996 Canadian census, the last prior to the amalgamation of Victoria County, the township has a total area of 123.05 km^{2} (47.51 mi^{2}). Like most of the city of Kawartha Lakes, Bexley is mostly rural. A few established communities dot the landscape, and the shores of Balsam and Silver Lakes are surrounded by seasonal cottages, while the remainder is mostly swamp, or forest. Farming is sparse in the region as the soil is very thin (About 2 inches on average). While Bexley lies almost entirely within the Paleozoic limestone region of southern Ontario, the small portion of the Gull River valley north of Silver Lake lying within the township is within the Precambrian Canadian Shield region.

== Demographics ==
As of the 1996 census, there were 1305 people, 540 households and 390 families residing in the township. The population density was 10.61 people per square kilometre (/mi^{2}). The racial makeup of the county was 1.9% Chinese, 0.8% Black Canadian, and the remaining 97.3% Caucasian.

There were 540 households and 390 families, out of which 92.31% were married or common-law couples, and 7.69% were single parent families. 27.78% of all households were made up of individuals. The average household value was $143,198 (equivalent to $264,500 in 2025).

The population was spread out, with 5.0% under the age of 4, 11.1% from 5 to 14, 8.8% from 15 to 24, 36.4% from 25 to 54, 15.7% from 55 to 64, and 22.2% who were 65 years of age or older. The median age was 40.5 years. For every 100 females there were 101.5 males.

The median per capita income for the township was $21,002 (equivalent to $38,800 in 2025). Males had a median income of $23,682 (equivalent to $43,700 in 2025) versus $18,009 (equivalent to $33,300 in 2025) for females.

In the population over 25, 14.7% had less than a grade nine education. 57.1% had at least a high school diploma or equivalent. 29.8% graduated from a non-university post-secondary institute, and 7.9% completed university.

== Communities ==
- Coboconk
- St. Mary's
- Victoria Road

== See also ==
- List of townships in Ontario
