= Icelandic Settlement Disaster Memorial =

Coordinates: 44.781577°N 78.652549°W

The Icelandic Settlement Disaster Memorial, also known as "In the Presence of a Soul", is a memorial at the former railway station in the village of Kinmount, Ontario. Affixed to the concrete base of the sculpture are plaques that describe the disaster in three languages. The memorial, placed by the Ontario Heritage Foundation and Agency of the Government of Ontario, was dedicated in July 2000.

The memorial documents a history of hardship experienced by a group of 352 Icelanders who arrived as emigrants in the fall of 1874, at the village of Kinmount. Delayed travel plans that soaked up their financial resources, and led to a late arrival in the fall of the year, poor living conditions, and lack of work due to an economic downturn in Ontario, resulted in the deaths of "thirty children...and upwards to ten grown-ups." The monument commemorates the experience of this group of pioneers.

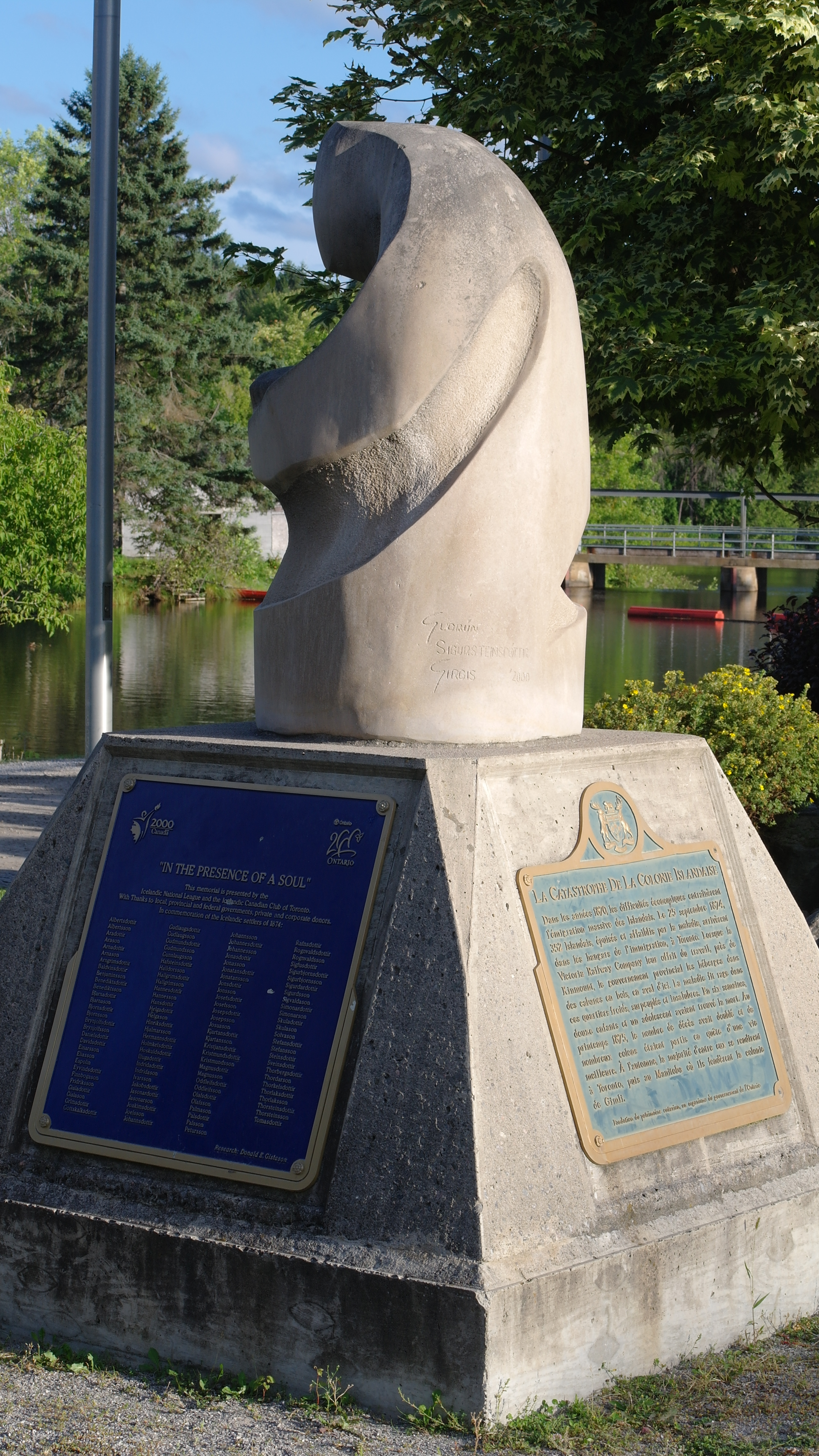
Icelandic Settlement Disaster Memorial, Kinmount, Ontario

Carved out of limestone in smooth geometric shapes, it depicts a mother and child. A spiral shape from the head of the figure moves to the left shoulder, creating an arm, which encompasses the suggestion of a child. The abstract monument, carved by sculptor Gudrun Sigursteinsdottir Girgis, is installed on a concrete plinth with plaques on the sides. The one on the southeast side explains the history of the Icelandic settlement, and the other lists the surnames of the settlers. Located beside the railway station in Kinmount, facing the Burnt River in a southeasterly direction, this location references the shanties built by the river, and the anticipated work building the railway. The tragic events of the winter of 1874 caused the new settlers to look elsewhere for settlement. The intervention of Lord Dufferin, the Governor General of Canada enabled the Icelanders to resettle in Manitoba.

== Text of historical plaque ==
"In the 1870s, economic distress prompted mass emigration from Iceland. On September 25th, 1874, 352 Icelanders, exhausted and weakened by illness arrived at the emigration sheds in Toronto. When the Victoria Railway Company offered work constructing its line from near Kinmount, the provincial government housed the Icelanders in log shanties down river from here. Poor ventilation, sanitation and diet allowed sickness to rage through their cold, over-crowded quarters. Within six weeks, twelve children and a teenager had died. By the spring of 1875, the death toll had doubled and many of the settlers scattered in search of a better life. In the fall, most regrouped in Toronto and travelled west to found the settlement of Gimli, Manitoba."

Additional plaques include this text in Icelandic and French.
