= St. Mary's, Kawartha Lakes, Ontario =

Coordinates: 44°34′36.94″N 78°53′40.34″W

St. Mary's was the site of a planned village within early Victoria County, in the Canadian province of Ontario. The site was laid aside in the surveying of the county in the 1830s, but was later found to be unusable when limestone was discovered two inches below the ground. Today its site marks one end of a man-made canal between Balsam Lake and Lake Simcoe, part of the Trent-Severn Waterway.

== History ==
When the township of Bexley (in the now defunct Victoria County, now the city of Kawartha Lakes) was surveyed in the 1830s, St. Mary's was the first town site reserved in the newly surveyed area. It was to be built on the west shore of West Bay on Balsam Lake, at the end of the Portage Road. The Portage Road was an early colonization road following the route of the Indian portage between Lake Simcoe and Balsam Lake. Limestone was discovered lying about two inches deep in the soil of the town-to-be. Since no ditches or cellars could be dug, the site was quickly abandoned. The property of the reserved town site remained in the hands of the government for some time, until eventually being absorbed into the adjoining Laidlaw estate.

The Trent Canal reached Balsam lake in 1873. Continuation of the waterway to Lake Simcoe required the building of a canal to the Talbot River, which flows into Lake Simcoe. The former St. Mary's site was chosen as the starting point for the canal, which was dug westward through the rock to a swamp along the Grass River. The swamp was flooded, forming Mitchell Lake.

== Aros ==
For several years, a post office existed, named Aros, adjacent to the St. Mary's site. The post office was established in December 1866 by its first postmaster, Charles McInnis, who had the office named after his birthplace in Scotland. Mail was delivered every two weeks to and from Kirkfield. The service was discontinued in 1872, when the Toronto and Nipissing Railway established a station in Victoria Road and a post office was built there. Aros remained open for another 12 years, before shutting its doors on April 1, 1884.
