= Ancona Point, Ontario =

Community in City of Kawartha Lakes, Canada

Ancona Point
- Community
- Location within Southern Ontario Location within Ontario Location within Canada
- Coordinates: 44°30′11″N 78°36′51″W
- Country: Canada
- Province: Ontario
- Municipality: Kawartha Lakes

Ancona Point, Ontario is located in the former Township of Verulam, Ontario within the city of Kawartha Lakes, Ontario, Canada, and lies on Sturgeon Lake, 8 kilometres (5 mi) along County Road 24 south-west of Bobcaygeon.

This stop on the former Canadian Pacific Railway was to have been called Scotch Line, but, after a disagreement between local residents, the completely unrelated Ancona Point was chosen as the station name. Scotch Line Road, which travels south from Ancona Point to Ontario Highway 36, retains the originally mooted name.
