= Carden Township =

Former township in southern Ontario, Canada

Coordinates: 44°39′N 79°04′W

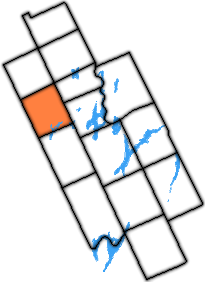
Carden Township within former Victoria County

The Township of Carden was a municipality in the north-west corner of Victoria County, now the city of Kawartha Lakes, in the Canadian province of Ontario.

== Geography ==
According to the 1996 Canadian census, the last prior to the amalgamation of Victoria County, the township has a total area of 186.84 km^{2} (72.14 sq mi).

== Name ==
Sir John Colborne, Lieutenant-Governor of Upper Canada from 1830 to 1836 named the town to honour Admiral John Surman Carden 1771-1858 who embarked Sir John following the relief of Sir John Moore's army at Corunna in the Peninsula War.

== Demographics ==
*Note that the following precise figures were rounded to the nearest 5 by Statistics Canada, and that percentages may have a small statistical error.

As of the census of 1996, there were 890 people, 335 households and 285 families in the township. The population density was 4.75 people/km^{2} (12.3 people/sq mi). The racial makeup of the county was 100% Caucasian, with no permanent residents of a visible minority.

There were 335 households and 285 families, out of which 91.20% were married couples, and 8.80% were single parent families. 14.93% of households were made up of individuals. The average household value was $165,563.

The age distribution was 5.1% under the age of 4, 12.4% from 5 to 14, 10.7% from 15 to 24, 40.5% from 25 to 54, 12.9% from 55 to 64, and 18.0% 65 or older. The median age was 40.5 years. For every 100 females there were 108.2 males.

The median per capita income for the township was $21,667. Males had a median income of $28,007 versus $14,370 for females.

In the population over 25, 19.0% had less than a grade nine education. 54.8% had at least a high school diploma or equivalent. While 35.7% graduated from a non-university post-secondary institute, only 4.8% completed university.

== Communities ==
- Dalrymple
- Carden (converted to Carden Alvar Provincial Park in 2014)
- Horncastle (ghost town)
- Rohallion

== See also ==
- List of townships in Ontario
