= Eldon Township =

Former township in southern Ontario, Canada

Coordinates: 44°29′N 79°00′W

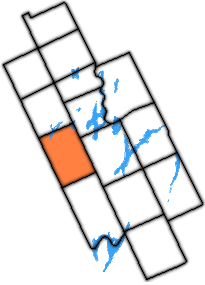
Eldon Township within former Victoria County

The Township of Eldon was a municipality located in the west of the former Victoria County, now the city of Kawartha Lakes, in Ontario, Canada.

== Communities ==
- Kirkfield
- Bolsover
- Glenarm
- Eldon
- Woodville

== See also ==
- List of townships in Ontario
