= Verulam Park, Ontario =

Community in Kawartha Lakes, Ontario, Canada

Coordinates: 44.50283°N 78.65772°W

Verulam Park is a residential community in the city of Kawartha Lakes, Ontario located at the end of Concession IV on the north shore of Sturgeon Lake. It was given for the enjoyment of the people of the Verulam Township by Colonel McAlpine, who lived in a large mansion nearby. The site also has a boat launch and wharf provided by the Canada Department of Fisheries.
