= View Lake, Ontario =

Village in Ontario, Canada

Coordinates: 44°12′51″N 78°46′20″W

View Lake is a small village located in Ontario, Canada. It is situated on the boundary of the Regional Municipality of Durham and the city of Kawartha Lakes, on the southern shores of Lake Scugog.

== History ==
The village was unincorporated in Victoria County prior to the formation of the city of Kawartha Lakes in 2001, and continues to have a very small population.

== Features ==
View Lake contains two small parks, and in the past, contained a train stop near its general store.

Attractions in View Lake include fishing, four-wheeling, biking and walking.

Public schooling is provided by the Durham District School Board and Trillium Lakelands District School Board. Catholic schooling is provided by the Peterborough Victoria Northumberland and Clarington Catholic District School Board. Students in the area have a choice of which school to attend.

There is no public transportation provided in View Lake.
