= Dalton Township, Ontario =

Former township in southern Ontario, Canada

Coordinates: 44°45′57″N 79°6′34″W

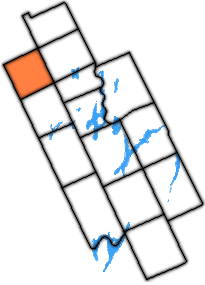
Dalton Township within Kawartha Lakes

The Township of Dalton was a municipality located in the northwest corner of the former Victoria County, now a geographic township in the city of Kawartha Lakes, in the Canadian province of Ontario. It was named after John Dalton (1766–1844), an English scientist who contributed to the foundations of atomic theory.

Dalton had an extensive history in logging and colonization along the Old Monck Road (Kawartha Lakes 45). Several Ghost villages dot the former township, many of them old logging/farming communities from the late 19th century. These include Ragged Rapids and Dartmoor. Some have survived since the logging days and remain inhabited, including Sadowa, Sebright, and Uphill. Back then, one of the most picturesque figures of the municipal history of the township was Joseph Thompson who was reeve for a quarter of a century. Thompson was a great hunter and many legends had been handed down concerning his prowess in the wilderness.

== Geography ==
According to the 1996 Canadian census, the last prior to the amalgamation of Victoria County, the township has a total area of 166.54 km^{2} (64.30 mi^{2}). Dalton lies mostly upon the Canadian Shield, owing its rough, impassable, lake filled landscape to the Precambrian granite. The far south and west of the township lie on the limestone plateau, and contain the only roads and inhabitants.

== Demographics ==
*Note that the following precise figures were rounded to the nearest 5 by Statistics Canada, and that percentages may have a small statistical error.

At the 1996 census, there were 440 people, 165 households and 130 families residing in the township. The population density was 2.64 people/km^{2} (6.8 people/mi^{2}). The racial makeup of the county was 100% Caucasian, with no permanent residents of a visible minority.

There were 165 households and 130 families, of which 92.31% were married couples, and 7.69% were single parent families. 21.21% of all households were made up of individuals. The average household value was $115,405.

Age distribution was 6.8% under the age of 4, 13.6% from 5 to 14, 9.1% from 15 to 24, 37.5% from 25 to 54, 14.8% from 55 to 64, and 17.0% who were 65 years of age or older. The median age was 40.5 years. For every 100 females there were 108.2 males.

The median per capita income for the township was $18,125. Males had a median income of $21,922 versus $13,483 for females.

In the population over 25, 15.6% had less than a grade nine education. 48.4% had at least a high school diploma or equivalent. 29.7% graduated from a non-university post-secondary institute, and 6.3% completed university.

== Communities ==
- Dalrymple
- Dalton
- Sadowa (dispersed community, shared with adjoining Laxton, Digby and Longford Township, another former township merged into Kawartha Lakes)
- Sebright
- Uphill (dispersed community, shared with adjoining former Laxton, Digby and Longford Township, another former township merged into Kawartha Lakes)

== See also ==
- List of townships in Ontario
