= Cameron, Ontario =

Cameron, Kawartha Lakes, Ontario
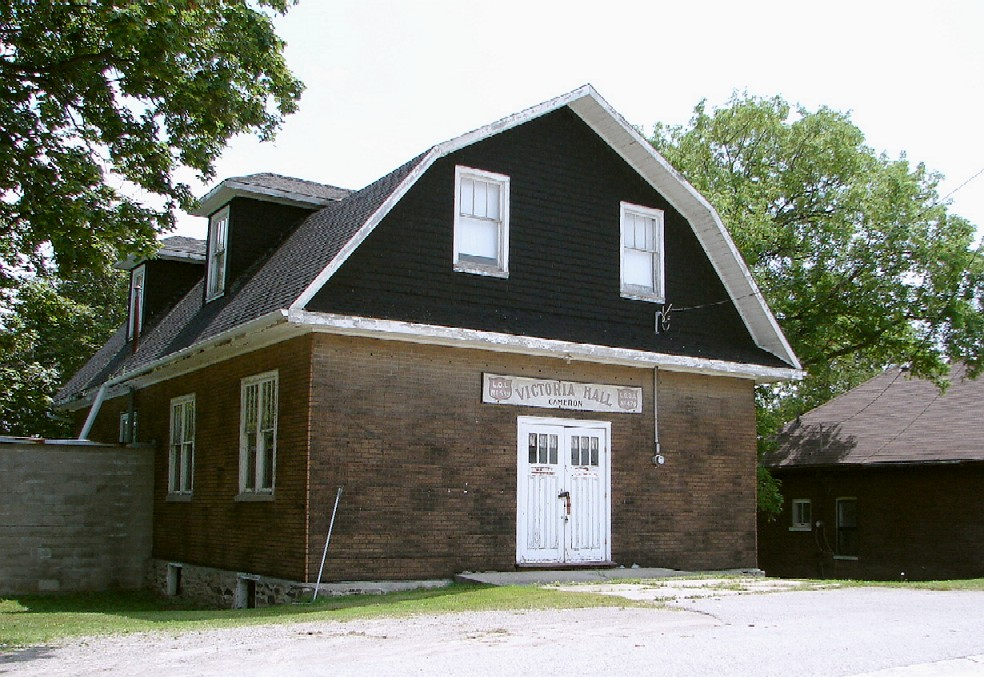

- Location of Cameron in Ontario
- Coordinates: 44°26′15″N 78°46′29″W
- Country: Canada
- Province: Ontario
- Municipality: City of Kawartha Lakes
- Time zone: UTC-5 (EST)
  - Summer (DST): UTC-4 (EDT)
- Postal code: K0M 1G0

Cameron is an unincorporated village in the City of Kawartha Lakes, in east-central Ontario, Canada. The village has a population of approximately 221 residents. Cameron is located at the junction of Highway 35, and Kawartha Lakes Road 34, 11 km north-west of Lindsay.

== History ==
Cameron, formerly part of Fenelon Township in Victoria County, was a busy village in the 19th century with a blacksmith, grave stone manufacturer, hotel, school, telegraph office and post office. Today, the post office, general store, Fenelon Township Elementary School, and Cameron Community Church are all located within the hub of the community. Cameron's main attraction is recreational fishing. Particularly in the hamlet of Long Beach on Sturgeon Lake.

Cameron is believed to be the site where Samuel de Champlain fought a battle with First Nations Peoples in 1613. It has been known as Cameron Line and Cameron Settlement.

While some say Cameron was named for Duncan Cameron, an early settler, others contend it was named for Chief Justice Sir Matthew Crooks Cameron, MPP and provincial secretary and commissioner of Crown lands, who died in 1887.

== Education ==
=== Public school ===
The construction of schools began in the 1840s. As the population grew, a variety of Section Schools (S.S.) were opened. Eventually S.S. 1, 2, 4, 5, 6, 7, 8, 9, & 10 were closed and sold upon the opening of Fenelon Township Public School in 1967. Additions to the current school building over the years have included an extension on the primary wing, a library-resource centre. The school has utilized 4 portable classrooms for many years.

A detailed history of the Cameron school can be found in Jim McKechnie's 1980 M.S. Graduate Studies essay, "Cameron School". Further information on the history of Fenelon Township's schools can be found in "A History of Fenelon Township, 1987".

The original school house is now owned by Cameron Community Church and used for many community functions.
