= Lake Dalrymple (Ontario) =

Lake in Ontario, Canada

- Dalrymple Lake
- Interactive map of Lake Dalrymple
- Location: Ontario, Canada
- Coordinates: 44.676695°N 79.118556°W
- Managing agency: Kawartha Conservation

Lake Dalrymple, also known as Dalrymple Lake, is a freshwater lake in southern Ontario, Canada. It is on the western edge of Kawartha Lakes.

Drownings occurred in the lake in 2010 and 2025.
