= Manvers Township =

Former township in southern Ontario, Canada

Coordinates: 44°10′N 78°38′W

Manvers Township within former Victoria County

The Township of Manvers (area 69,923 acres (283 km^{2})) was a municipality in the former Victoria County, now the city of Kawartha Lakes, in the Canadian province of Ontario.

== History ==
From 1792 to 1973 Manvers Township was located in Durham County, which was united with Northumberland County in 1800 for administrative purposes.

The township was officially established in 1816 and named in honour of Charles Pierrepont, 1st Earl Manvers. At that time land grants were made to United Empire Loyalists, retiring soldiers and other friends of the crown. Effective January 1, 1974, an extensive re-organization of municipal administrative divisions took place. Durham County was separated from Northumberland County and merged with most of the adjacent Ontario County to form the Regional Municipality of Durham. As part of this process Manvers Township was transferred to the County of Victoria.

Effective January 1, 2001, Victoria County was dissolved and its municipalities and townships were amalgamated; the new administrative municipal division was named the City of Kawartha Lakes.

== Communities ==
- Ballyduff
- Bethany
- Brunswick
- Fleetwood
- Franklin
- Janetville
- Lifford
- Lotus
- Manvers Station
- Pontypool
- Yelverton

== See also ==
- List of townships in Ontario

== Sources ==
- Province of Ontario -- A History 1615 to 1927 by Jesse Edgar Middletwon & Fred Landon, copyright 1927, Dominion Publishing Company, Toronto.
