= Laxton, Digby and Longford Township =

Former township in southern Ontario, Canada

Coordinates: 44.71161°N 78.82553°W

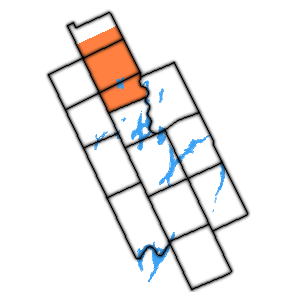
Laxton, Digby and Longford Township within Kawartha Lakes

The united Townships of Laxton, Digby and Longford were a municipality in the northern part of what is now Kawartha Lakes in the Canadian province of Ontario.

The former Township of Longford, was surveyed in 1861 by Brookes Wright Gossage, as one of ten townships sold to the Canadian Land and Emigration Company. Longford was the only one of the townships within Victoria County. In 1867 John Thomson purchased by auction the right to cut timber in the township, from the Canadian Land and Emigration Company, to supply timber for his mill at Longford Mills, named for the township. Thomson later purchased the township outright from the Company.

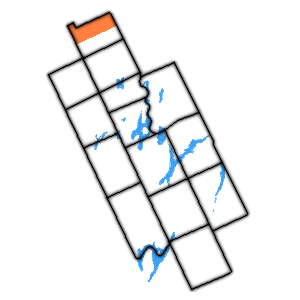
New Longford Township within Kawartha Lakes

The former township should not be confused with the extant Longford Township, a township wholly owned by Longford Reserve Limited, and contains no permanent inhabitants. The extant township is adjacent to the former (populated) township.

The old Digby fire tower was situated on rocky outcropping straight north of the village of Uphill, where the old fire trail used to exist, along the former alignment of the Victoria Rd. The tower was de-commissioned in the late 1960s. The area now is mostly swamp, but can be accessed on a newer private road to the west.

The township is also home to a few ghost settlements from the bygone logging/ farming era of the 19th century. These include: Ragged Rapids and the eastern part of Uphill.

== Communities ==
- Norland
- Sadowa (dispersed community, previously shared with adjoining Dalton Township, another former township merged into Kawartha Lakes)
- Uphill (dispersed community, previously shared with adjoining Dalton Township, another former township merged into Kawartha Lakes)

== See also ==
- List of townships in Ontario
