= Emily Township =

Former township in southern Ontario, Canada

Coordinates: 44°21′N 78°33′W

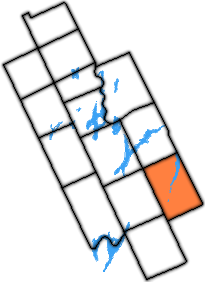
Emily Township within former Victoria County

The Township of Emily was a municipality located in the south-eastern corner of the former Victoria County, now the city of Kawartha Lakes, in Ontario, Canada.

Emily Township is also home to Emily Provincial Park.

== Communities ==
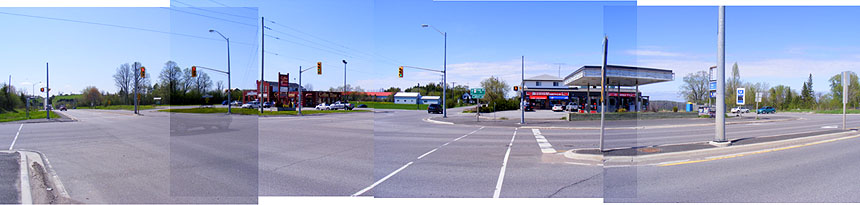
Fowler's Corner

- Downeyville
- Fee's Landing
- Fowlers Corners
- Omemee

== Role in amalgamation ==
Emily Township was responsible for requesting the commissioner who eventually ordered the amalgamation of the former County of Victoria municipalities.

== See also ==
- List of townships in Ontario
