= Valentia, Ontario =

Coordinates: 44.2464°N 78.8031°W

Valentia is a small community founded in 1807, located in the city of Kawartha Lakes, just south of the town of Lindsay on County Road 18 northeast of Lake Scugog. During its bicentennial celebrations in August 2007, it held its first Valentia Heritage Rodeo.

In 2014, the Valentia Church celebrated its 125 anniversary as part of the Valentia Heritage Weekend. It was first constructed as a Methodist church but then became a United church.

== See also ==
- List of unincorporated communities in Ontario
