= Lorneville, Ontario =

Community in Ontario, Canada

Coordinates: 44.417°N 79.000°W

Lorneville is a community in the Canadian province of Ontario, located within the city of Kawartha Lakes.

== See also ==
- List of communities in Ontario
