= Glenarm, Ontario =

Coordinates: 44°29′00″N 78°53′04″W

Glenarm is a community in the City of Kawartha Lakes (Ontario, Canada) of about 80 people. Very few people live in the actual hamlet itself, but the community spreads about 2 km in each direction.

At one time the hamlet included a general store, restaurant, church, two taverns, a blacksmith shop, dance hall and a jail, although the general store has since closed. The church, Knox Presbyterian, used to have many people attend, and now has about 60 members in its congregation. A cemetery with graves reaching back to the 1870s sits just south of the church.

== History ==
Originally called Hardscrabble, the village was settled by Scottish immigrants, whose descendants still live there on many original ancestral farms. Notably, the Amish community has recently moved into the area, which now houses two Amish bakeries, and fresh food stands.

In the heyday of Glenarm, large church picnics that were attended by up to 2000 people. Although it was discontinued in the 1950s. The Annual Glenarm Picnic was recently revived, and is held the 3rd Saturday of August, and usually brings 200-300 people to the event, with family members of original descendants traveling to engage in the field games, horseshoes and corn roast.

=== Recent ===
On May 21, 2013, a tornado touched down in the area and removed the roof from a home. A barn was destroyed and trees were downed as well. It was confirmed as an EF2 tornado by Environment Canada (only the second tornado in Canada to be rated on the Enhanced Fujita scale.

== See also ==
- Kawartha Lakes, Ontario
- List of Canadian tornadoes and tornado outbreaks (since 2001)
