= Burnt River, Ontario =

Burnt River
- Nickname: Rettie's Crossing
- Location of Burnt River in Ontario.
- Coordinates: 44°40′30″N 78°41′52″W
- Country: Canada
- Province: Ontario
- Municipality: City of Kawartha Lakes
- Elevation: 264 m (866 ft)

Population (2005)
  - Total: 250
- Time zone: UTC-5 (Eastern Time Zone)
  - Summer (DST): UTC-4 (Eastern Time Zone)
- Area code: 705

Burnt River is a hamlet located in the middle of the former Township of Somerville, in the City of Kawartha Lakes, Ontario, Canada. The community is on the Burnt River.

== History ==
Originally settled in the 1830s, the first name of the community was "Rettie's Crossing," after local settler Alexander Rettie. Another town further upstream was called "Rettie's Bridge." Mixed-up mail shipments continued until some time in the 1920s, when an unfortunate accident occurred.

At the time, there was a Shell gas station located in the centre of the village, across the road from the current post office. A gentleman arriving in his Model T Ford smashed into the gravity-fed gas pumps and severed the lines connected to the above-ground gasoline storage tank. The gasoline was almost immediately ignited, and flowed like a river, down the main street engulfing everything it touched in flames, until it poured into and spread across the fast-moving river.

Fire equipment was virtually unheard of in the little hamlet at this time, and although there was a well-organized fire brigade, there was little that could be done to save the town, until the 2 o'clock train arrived. The train was stopped across the main crossing, shielding half the town, while the water in the tender was used to extinguish the remaining flames on the south side of the crossing. Careful inspection shows the modern construction on one side of the village, while dwellings on the other half consist of older wood and stone masonry.

According to local legend, there were 18 miles of "Burnt River" stretching from there to Cameron Lake. Shortly after this, the Post Office changed its name to "Burnt River," and the former village of "Rettie's Bridge" to the north became known as "Kinmount."

== Modern times ==
Burnt River is home to two churches, a post office, a community centre and fire station. The library branch was closed by the City in 2017 and the general store closed some years ago. Many cottagers enjoy the tranquil waters of nearby Four Mile Lake. Farming, forestry and aggregates are continuing industries in and around Burnt River. Burnt River lies in a flood plain. Burnt River experiences a major flood at least every eight years.

Shipments of pine from the Somerville Pinery continued by rail until circa 1982 when operations on the Haliburton Subdivision of the Canadian National Railway was abandoned by Railway Transport Committee order. The line and its rails and appurtenances were removed and sold for scrap in the summer of 1983.

Today, that rail line has been preserved as a recreational trail reaching from Lindsay all the way to Haliburton.

Infamous cult leader Roch Thériault once had a commune in the area. His brutal story was immortalized in a film called Savage Messiah.

== Flooding ==
Most frequent flooding occurs in the lower stretch of the river between the community of Burnt River and Cameron Lake where the riverbanks are fairly low and the flood plain is wide; this type of river valley topography increases the potential for flooding. In recent years more recreational development has taken place along the river, which has greatly increased flood damages due to flooding such as in 1960, 1976, and 1981 spring floods. The flood plain mapping identified the potential areas for flooding and the need to protect future development from flood damages. That need became evident during the 1991 spring flood when the river rose 5 metres at Burnt River and over $500,000 of flood damages to dwellings occurred and many access roads were flooded.

In 2013, a state of emergency was declared for the City of Kawartha Lakes due to flooding in the Burnt River, Black River and Gull River watersheds. On April 20, 2013, the Burnt River was rising at an average rate of 1.7 cm/h and not expected to crest within the next 24–36 hours. It was projected that at that rate of rise there was potential for the Burnt River at the Village of Burnt River to reach and exceed 1991 flood levels. The Trent-Severn Waterway made efforts to reduce flows along the Burnt and Irondale Rivers. The weather forecast called for up to 40 mm of rain over the following weeks. City officials strongly recommended residents in affected areas move to higher ground, perhaps with family and friends. The Burnt River Community Centre was opened as an evacuation centre, and the Red Cross was on site. Kawartha Lakes Fire Rescue and Public Works staff went door-to-door in the flood affected areas to strongly encourage residents to evacuate.
