= Somerville Township =

Former township in southern Ontario, Canada

Township of Somerville
- Former township
- Interactive map of Township of Somerville
- Coordinates: 44°41′30″N 78°43′0″W
- Country: Canada
- Province: Ontario
- County: Victoria County
- Amalgamated: 1 January 2001
- Incorporated into: City of Kawartha Lakes

The Township of Somerville was a township located in the north-eastern corner of the former Victoria County, now the city of Kawartha Lakes.

== Communities ==
- Burnt River
- Kinmount
- Union Creek
- Baddow
- Dongola

== See also ==
- List of townships in Ontario
