= Rokeby, Ontario =

Human settlement in Ontario, Canada

Coordinates: 44.5420°N 78.5464°W

Rokeby, Ontario was the Government townsite located on the mainland at Bobcaygeon, Ontario, Canada, by the Lieutenant-Governor of Upper Canada, Sir John Colborne. Through common usage and the establishment of a Post Office in 1838, the name Bobcaygeon came to describe the entire town.

Rokeby Park was the home of John Morritt, in County Durham, England. This was close to the confluence of the River Greta and the River Tees. This area inspired the painting 'Rokeby', by Turner, which depicts the waterfall and rocks at the 'meeting of the waters'. It seems likely that both Colborne and Thomas Need would have been familiar with this part of England, and possibly with the painting. They would certainly have been familiar with the epic poem Rokeby, by Sir Walter Scott, which was written, and set, in that locality. Rokeby would have been a natural choice for this place of rapids, rocks, and waterfalls - which we now know as Bobcaygeon.

In 2023, a new Polyethylene production facility was opened in the town, being named after the townsite.
