= Kawartha Lakes =

City in Ontario, Canada

- City (single-tier)
- City of Kawartha Lakes
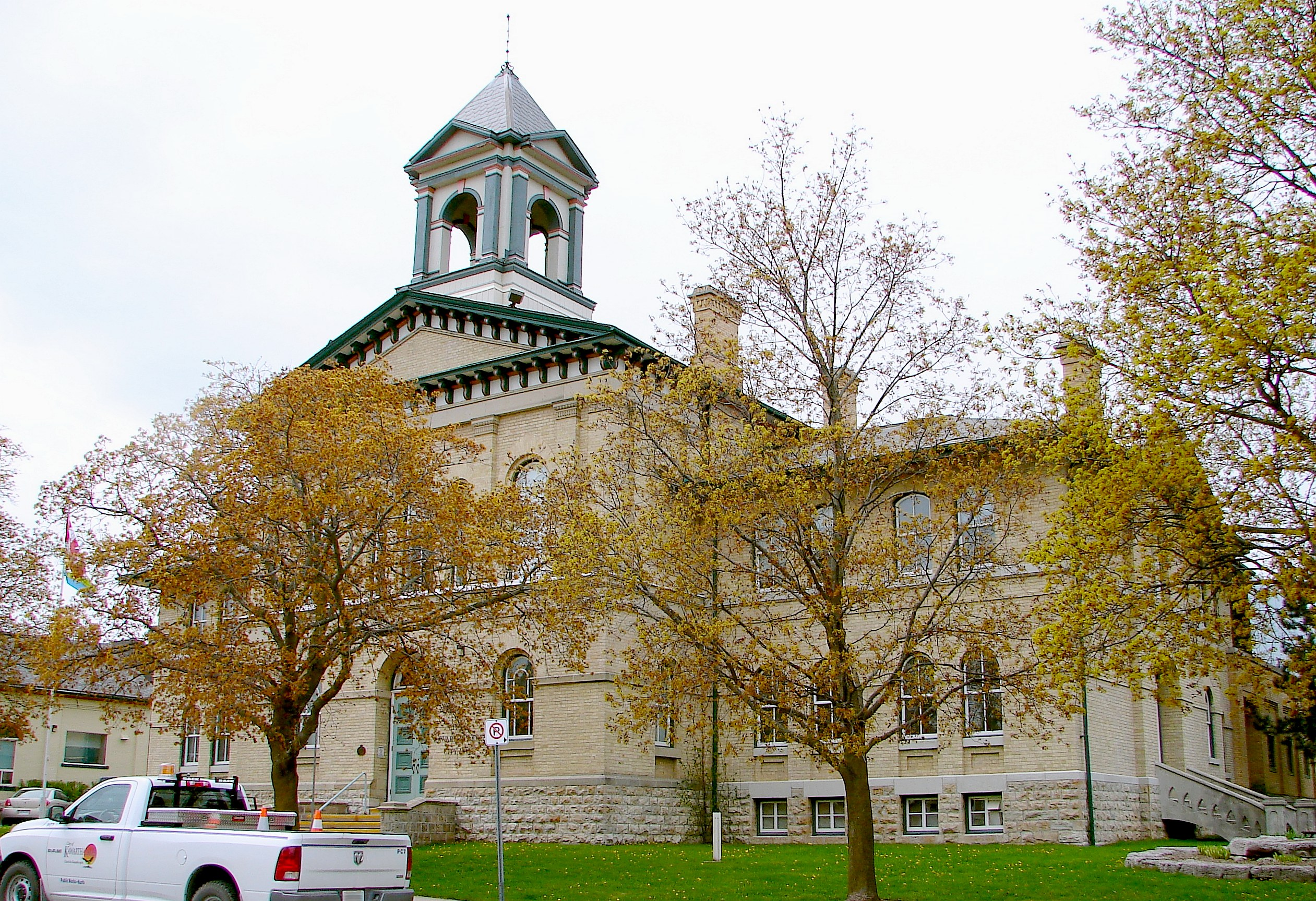
- Kawartha Lakes city hall in Lindsay
- Motto: "Jump In"
- Kawartha Lakes' location within Ontario
- Coordinates: 44°21′N 78°45′W
- Country: Canada
- Province: Ontario
- Amalgamation: January 1, 2001
- Seat: Lindsay

Government
  - Mayor: Charles McDonald
  - Deputy Mayor: Mark Doble
  - Council: City of Kawartha Lakes Council
  - MP: Jamie Schmale (CPC)
  - MPP: Laurie Scott (PC)

Area
  - Land: 3,033.66 km^{2} (1,171.30 sq mi)

Population (2021)
  - Total: 79,247
  - Density: 26.1/km^{2} (68/sq mi)
- Time zone: UTC-5 (EST)
  - Summer (DST): UTC-4 (EDT)
- Postal Code: K0L, K0M, K9V, L0A, L0B, L0K
- Area codes: 705, 249
- Website: www.kawarthalakes.ca

Kawartha Lakes (2021 population: 79,247) is a single-tier municipality in Central Ontario, Canada. Though structured as a single-tier municipality, Kawartha Lakes is the size of a typical Ontario county and is mostly rural. It is the second largest single-tier municipality in Ontario by land area (after Greater Sudbury).

The main population centres are the communities of Lindsay (population: 22,367), Bobcaygeon (population: 3,576), Fenelon Falls (population: 2,490), Omemee (population: 1,060) and Woodville (population: 718).

== History ==
The Kawartha Lakes area is situated on the traditional territory of the Anishinaabeg, Huron-Wendat and more recently, the Haudenosaunee peoples. The city's name is from the Kawartha Lakes. Kawartha is an anglicization of Ka-wa-tha (from Ka-wa-tae-gum-maug or Gaa-waategamaag), which was coined in 1895 by Martha Whetung of the Curve Lake First Nations. It meant "land of reflections" in the Anishinaabe language, according to Whetung. The word was later changed by tourism promoters to Kawartha, meaning "bright waters and happy lands."

Prior to its restructuring as a city, the area was known as Victoria County. The city was created in 2001, during the ruling provincial Progressive Conservative party's "Common Sense Revolution". Through provincial legislation, the former Victoria County and its constituent municipalities were amalgamated into one entity named the City of Kawartha Lakes.

This act was implemented by the Victoria County Restructuring Commission, led by commissioner Harry Kitchen. Despite general opposition from residents of the area, the provincial government pushed forward with the amalgamation, which officially came into effect on January 1, 2001.

By a narrow margin (51% for, 49% against), the citizens of Kawartha Lakes voted to de-amalgamate in a November 2003 local plebiscite, but the provincial and municipal governments did not act upon it.

=== Victoria County ===
Prior to 2001, Victoria County consisted of 13 separate townships and 6 incorporated communities, each with their own local governments:

The incorporated townships were (with main population centres):

- Bexley (Victoria Road, Coboconk)
- Carden (Dalrymple)
- Dalton (Sebright, Uphill, Sadowa)
- Eldon (Glenarm, Kirkfield, Woodville)
- Emily (Omemee, Downeyville, Fowlers Corners)
- Fenelon (Cameron, Cambray, Powles Corners)
- Laxton, Digby and Longford (Uphill, Norland)
- Longford (largely uninhabited)
- Manvers (Janetville, Bethany, Pontypool)
- Mariposa (Oakwood, Little Britain, Manilla)
- Ops (Reaboro)
- Somerville (Coboconk, Kinmount)
- Verulam (Dunsford, Bobcaygeon)

The township of Laxton, Digby and Longford is an amalgamation of the once individual townships of Digby, Laxton, and Longford Township. In 2000, just prior to amalgamation into the city of Kawartha Lakes, the township of Verulam and the village of Bobcaygeon were amalgamated into the Municipality of Bobcaygeon/Verulam, and the separate townships of Carden and Dalton amalgamated into the Township of Carden/Dalton.

Incorporated communities were:

- Town of Lindsay
- Village of Bobcaygeon
- Village of Fenelon Falls
- Village of Omemee
- Village of Sturgeon Point
- Village of Woodville

== Geography ==
Surrounding counties are:

- Muskoka District Municipality
- Haliburton County
- Northumberland County
- Peterborough County
- Regional Municipality of Durham
- Simcoe County

=== Communities ===
- Ancona Point
- Bethany
- Bobcaygeon
- Bolsover
- Burnt River
- Cameron
- Coboconk
- Dalrymple
- Dongola
- East Emily
- Eldon
- Fenelon Falls
- Glenarm
- Head Lake
- Kinmount
- Kirkfield
- Lindsay
- Little Britain
- Lorneville
- Manvers
- Mariposa
- Norland
- Omemee
- Pontypool
- Rokeby
- Rosedale
- St. Mary's
- Sturgeon Point
- Valentia
- Victoria Road
- View Lake
- Woodville

=== Climate ===
The Kawartha Lakes area has a humid continental climate with warm, sometimes humid summers and cold snowy winters. The snowier areas are typically the ones closer to large lakes, and snow usually ranges from 150 cm to 200 cm in a year in most areas.

Climate data for Janetville, Ontario, 1981-2010 normals, extremes 1981-2010
| Month | Jan | Feb | Mar | Apr | May | Jun | Jul | Aug | Sep | Oct | Nov | Dec | Year |
|---|---|---|---|---|---|---|---|---|---|---|---|---|---|
| Record high °C (°F) | 13.0 (55.4) | 13.0 (55.4) | 24.5 (76.1) | 30.5 (86.9) | 33.0 (91.4) | 34.0 (93.2) | 36.5 (97.7) | 36.0 (96.8) | 33.0 (91.4) | 27.5 (81.5) | 21.0 (69.8) | 18.5 (65.3) | 36.5 (97.7) |
| Mean daily maximum °C (°F) | −3.3 (26.1) | −1.7 (28.9) | 3.5 (38.3) | 11.6 (52.9) | 18.2 (64.8) | 23.8 (74.8) | 26.3 (79.3) | 25.3 (77.5) | 20.6 (69.1) | 13.4 (56.1) | 6.0 (42.8) | −0.5 (31.1) | 11.9 (53.5) |
| Mean daily minimum °C (°F) | −12.0 (10.4) | −11.4 (11.5) | −6.7 (19.9) | 0.4 (32.7) | 6.0 (42.8) | 11.2 (52.2) | 13.8 (56.8) | 13.0 (55.4) | 8.9 (48.0) | 3.4 (38.1) | −1.9 (28.6) | −8.5 (16.7) | 1.4 (34.4) |
| Record low °C (°F) | −35.0 (−31.0) | −31.0 (−23.8) | −31.5 (−24.7) | −15.0 (5.0) | −5.0 (23.0) | −2.0 (28.4) | 4.0 (39.2) | −0.5 (31.1) | −4.0 (24.8) | −9.5 (14.9) | −18.5 (−1.3) | −33.0 (−27.4) | −35.0 (−31.0) |
| Average precipitation mm (inches) | 72.3 (2.85) | 55.3 (2.18) | 61.7 (2.43) | 74.6 (2.94) | 88.7 (3.49) | 84.0 (3.31) | 73.7 (2.90) | 89.2 (3.51) | 97.2 (3.83) | 80.7 (3.18) | 99.0 (3.90) | 72.7 (2.86) | 949.1 (37.38) |
| Average snowfall cm (inches) | 47.2 (18.6) | 34.0 (13.4) | 29.4 (11.6) | 10.3 (4.1) | 0.1 (0.0) | 0.0 (0.0) | 0.0 (0.0) | 0.0 (0.0) | 0.0 (0.0) | 2.1 (0.8) | 21.2 (8.3) | 42.3 (16.7) | 186.6 (73.5) |
Source: Environment Canada

Climate data for Lindsay (1981−2010)
| Month | Jan | Feb | Mar | Apr | May | Jun | Jul | Aug | Sep | Oct | Nov | Dec | Year |
|---|---|---|---|---|---|---|---|---|---|---|---|---|---|
| Record high °C (°F) | 11.5 (52.7) | 11.5 (52.7) | 24.0 (75.2) | 29.5 (85.1) | 32.0 (89.6) | 34.0 (93.2) | 36.5 (97.7) | 36.5 (97.7) | 32.5 (90.5) | 27.0 (80.6) | 21.1 (70.0) | 17.5 (63.5) | 36.5 (97.7) |
| Mean daily maximum °C (°F) | −4.1 (24.6) | −2.1 (28.2) | 2.9 (37.2) | 11.2 (52.2) | 18.2 (64.8) | 23.4 (74.1) | 26.0 (78.8) | 24.8 (76.6) | 20.0 (68.0) | 12.8 (55.0) | 5.6 (42.1) | −0.6 (30.9) | 11.5 (52.7) |
| Daily mean °C (°F) | −8.4 (16.9) | −6.8 (19.8) | −1.8 (28.8) | 6.0 (42.8) | 12.5 (54.5) | 17.7 (63.9) | 20.3 (68.5) | 19.2 (66.6) | 14.8 (58.6) | 8.2 (46.8) | 2.0 (35.6) | −4.4 (24.1) | 6.6 (43.9) |
| Mean daily minimum °C (°F) | −12.7 (9.1) | −11.4 (11.5) | −6.6 (20.1) | 0.7 (33.3) | 6.8 (44.2) | 11.9 (53.4) | 14.4 (57.9) | 13.5 (56.3) | 9.4 (48.9) | 3.5 (38.3) | −1.6 (29.1) | −8.1 (17.4) | 1.7 (35.1) |
| Record low °C (°F) | −36.5 (−33.7) | −35 (−31) | −30.5 (−22.9) | −14 (7) | −4 (25) | −2.5 (27.5) | 5.0 (41.0) | 1.7 (35.1) | −3.5 (25.7) | −9.4 (15.1) | −18.5 (−1.3) | −34 (−29) | −36.5 (−33.7) |
| Average precipitation mm (inches) | 66.8 (2.63) | 54.9 (2.16) | 55.7 (2.19) | 65.2 (2.57) | 87.3 (3.44) | 82.6 (3.25) | 75.8 (2.98) | 85.7 (3.37) | 88.2 (3.47) | 76.6 (3.02) | 89.8 (3.54) | 68.5 (2.70) | 896.9 (35.31) |
| Average rainfall mm (inches) | 22.4 (0.88) | 22.2 (0.87) | 30.4 (1.20) | 57.5 (2.26) | 87.3 (3.44) | 82.6 (3.25) | 75.8 (2.98) | 85.7 (3.37) | 88.2 (3.47) | 74.9 (2.95) | 72.3 (2.85) | 29.4 (1.16) | 728.6 (28.69) |
| Average snowfall cm (inches) | 44.4 (17.5) | 32.7 (12.9) | 25.3 (10.0) | 7.7 (3.0) | 0.0 (0.0) | 0.0 (0.0) | 0.0 (0.0) | 0.0 (0.0) | 0.0 (0.0) | 1.7 (0.7) | 17.5 (6.9) | 39.0 (15.4) | 168.3 (66.3) |
| Average precipitation days (≥ 0.2 mm) | 17.2 | 13.4 | 13.0 | 13.8 | 14.7 | 12.4 | 11.0 | 12.2 | 13.6 | 16.1 | 16.5 | 16.0 | 169.9 |
| Average rainy days (≥ 0.2 mm) | 4.5 | 4.2 | 7.4 | 12.2 | 14.7 | 12.4 | 11.0 | 12.2 | 13.6 | 15.8 | 12.2 | 6.2 | 126.3 |
| Average snowy days (≥ 0.2 cm) | 13.8 | 10.4 | 7.2 | 3.0 | 0.0 | 0.0 | 0.0 | 0.0 | 0.0 | 0.58 | 5.6 | 11.1 | 51.6 |
| Mean monthly sunshine hours | 89.4 | 100.8 | 144.2 | 176.0 | 204.0 | 220.4 | 278.5 | 221.1 | 156.2 | 128.7 | 80.0 | 60.1 | 1,859.2 |
| Percentage possible sunshine | 31.1 | 34.3 | 39.1 | 43.7 | 44.6 | 47.5 | 59.3 | 50.9 | 41.5 | 37.7 | 27.6 | 21.7 | 39.9 |
Source: Environment Canada

== Demographics ==
In the 2021 Census of Population conducted by Statistics Canada, Kawartha Lakes had a population of 79,247 living in 32,708 of its 38,947 total private dwellings, a change of 5.1% from its 2016 population of 75,423. With a land area of 3,033.66 km^{2} (1,171.30 sq mi), it had a population density of 26.1/km^{2} (67.7/sq mi) in 2021.

Canada census – Kawartha Lakes community profile

| | 2021 | 2016 | 2011 |
| Population | 79,247 (+5.1% from 2016) | 75,423 (3% from 2011) | 73,219 (-1.8% from 2006) |
| Land area | 3,033.66 km^{2} (1,171.30 sq mi) | 3,084.38 km^{2} (1,190.89 sq mi) | 3,083.06 km^{2} (1,190.38 sq mi) |
| Population density | 26.1/km^{2} (68/sq mi) | 24.5/km^{2} (63/sq mi) | 23.7/km^{2} (61/sq mi) |
| Median age | 51.6 (M: 50.4, F: 53.2) | 46.7 (M: 45.8, F: 47.6) | 48.4 (M: 47.6, F: 49.2) |
| Private dwellings | 38,947 (total) 32,708 (occupied) | 38,444 (total) | 37,161 (total) |
| Median household income | $82,000 | | $69,465 |

References: 2021 2016 2011

Historical census populations – Kawartha Lakes
| Year | Pop. | ±% |
|---|---|---|
| 2001 | 69,179 | — |
| 2006 | 74,561 | +7.8% |
| 2011 | 73,219 | −1.8% |
| 2016 | 75,423 | +3.0% |
| 2021 | 79,247 | +5.1% |
Source: Statistics Canada

=== Ethnicity ===
Ethnic Origins (2021):

Only ethnic groups that comprise greater than 1% of the population are included. Note that a person can report more than one group

- English: 35.9%
- Irish: 27.2%
- Scottish: 25.5%
- Canadian: 20.6%
- German: 8.8%
- French n.o.s: 7.5%
- British Isles n.o.s: 5.8%
- Dutch: 5.3%
- Italian: 3.4%
- Welsh: 3.0%
- Polish: 2.5%
- Caucasian (White), n.o.s.: 2.1%
- Ukrainian: 2.1%
- European, n.o.s.: 1.5%
- First Nations n.o.s: 1.4%
- Métis: 1.1%
- French Canadian: 1.0%

In 2021, Kawartha Lakes was 93.7% white/European, 3.4% visible minorities, and 2.9% Indigenous. The largest visible minority groups were South Asian (0.9%), Black (0.8%) and Chinese (0.5%).

Panethnic groups in the Municipality of Kawartha Lakes (2001−2021)
| Panethnic group | 2021 | | 2016 | | 2011 | | 2006 | | 2001 | |
| Panethnic group | Pop. | % | Pop. | % | Pop. | % | Pop. | % | Pop. | % |
|---|---|---|---|---|---|---|---|---|---|---|
| European (Note: Statistic includes all persons that did not make up part of a visible minority or an indigenous identity.) | 72,385 | 93.73% | 69,850 | 95.2% | 68,810 | 96.31% | 70,915 | 96.67% | 66,990 | 97.85% |
| Indigenous | 2,210 | 2.86% | 1,995 | 2.72% | 1,380 | 1.93% | 1,255 | 1.71% | 785 | 1.15% |
| South Asian | 675 | 0.87% | 340 | 0.46% | 330 | 0.46% | 360 | 0.49% | 120 | 0.18% |
| African | 605 | 0.78% | 280 | 0.38% | 265 | 0.37% | 250 | 0.34% | 160 | 0.23% |
| East Asian (Note: Statistic includes total responses of "Chinese", "Korean", and "Japanese" under visible minority section on census.) | 540 | 0.7% | 360 | 0.49% | 415 | 0.58% | 280 | 0.38% | 160 | 0.23% |
| Southeast Asian (Note: Statistic includes total responses of "Filipino" and "Southeast Asian" under visible minority section on census.) | 220 | 0.28% | 315 | 0.43% | 85 | 0.12% | 75 | 0.1% | 85 | 0.12% |
| Latin American | 190 | 0.25% | 40 | 0.05% | 35 | 0.05% | 65 | 0.09% | 25 | 0.04% |
| Middle Eastern (Note: Statistic includes total responses of "West Asian" and "Arab" under visible minority section on census.) | 55 | 0.07% | 115 | 0.16% | 25 | 0.03% | 40 | 0.05% | 85 | 0.12% |
| Other (Note: Statistic includes total responses of "Visible minority, n.i.e." and "Multiple visible minorities" under visible minority section on census.) | 145 | 0.19% | 75 | 0.1% | 90 | 0.13% | 110 | 0.15% | 45 | 0.07% |
| Total responses | 77,230 | 97.45% | 73,375 | 97.28% | 71,450 | 97.58% | 73,360 | 98.39% | 68,460 | 98.96% |
| Total population | 79,247 | 100% | 75,423 | 100% | 73,219 | 100% | 74,561 | 100% | 69,179 | 100% |
Note: Totals greater than 100% due to multiple origin responses

=== Religion ===
53.8% of Kawartha Lakes residents were Christian in 2021, down from 68.8% in 2011. 28.3% were Protestant, including 12.7% United Church, 7.0% Anglican, 3.3% Presbyterian and 2.5% Baptist. 15.6% were Catholic, 5.8% were Christian n.o.s, and 4.1% belonged to other Christian denominations or Christian-related traditions. Non-religious and secular residents were 44.5% of the population, up from 30.3% in 2011. 1.7% of the population belonged to other religions and spiritual traditions, up from 0.9% in 2011. The largest non-Christian religion was Hinduism (0.4%).

== Government ==
Kawartha Lakes is governed by a City Council consisting of the Mayor and one councillor from each of the City's wards. From 2001 to the 2018 election, there were 16 wards and councillors, but this was changed to 8 wards for the 2018 election. The mayor and councillors are elected for four-year terms, as mandated by the Government of Ontario for all municipalities in the province. The mayor of Kawartha Lakes is Charles McDonald and Deputy Mayor is Mark Doble. The Deputy Mayor is a special appointment for one of the 8 councillors and is elected each year by members of Council at a Regular Council meeting in December.

Kawartha Lakes federal election results
| Year | Liberal | | Conservative | | New Democratic | | Green | |
|---|---|---|---|---|---|---|---|---|
| 2021 | 22% | 9,817 | 53% | 23,337 | 15% | 6,463 | 2% | 1,056 |
| 2019 | 25% | 11,039 | 50% | 21,544 | 15% | 6,636 | 8% | 3,329 |

Kawartha Lakes provincial election results
| Year | PC | | New Democratic | | Liberal | | Green | |
|---|---|---|---|---|---|---|---|---|
| 2022 | 52% | 16,866 | 16% | 5,163 | 13% | 4,342 | 7% | 2,129 |
| 2018 | 57% | 21,772 | 26% | 9,804 | 10% | 3,948 | 4% | 1,643 |

For purposes of electing representatives provincially, the city is within the riding of Haliburton—Kawartha Lakes—Brock (provincial electoral district). Beginning with the 2025 federal election the city is in the riding of Haliburton—Kawartha Lakes. Its Member of Provincial Parliament (MPP) is Laurie Scott of the Progressive Conservative Party, elected in 2018. Its federal Member of Parliament (MP) is Jamie Schmale of the Conservative Party, who was elected in 2015.

Mayors of Kawartha Lakes include:

- Art Truax (2001-2003)
- Barb Kelly (2003-2006)
- Ric McGee (2006-2014)
- Andy Letham (2014-2022)
- Doug Elmslie (2022-2026)
- Charles McDonald (2026-Present)

== Attractions ==
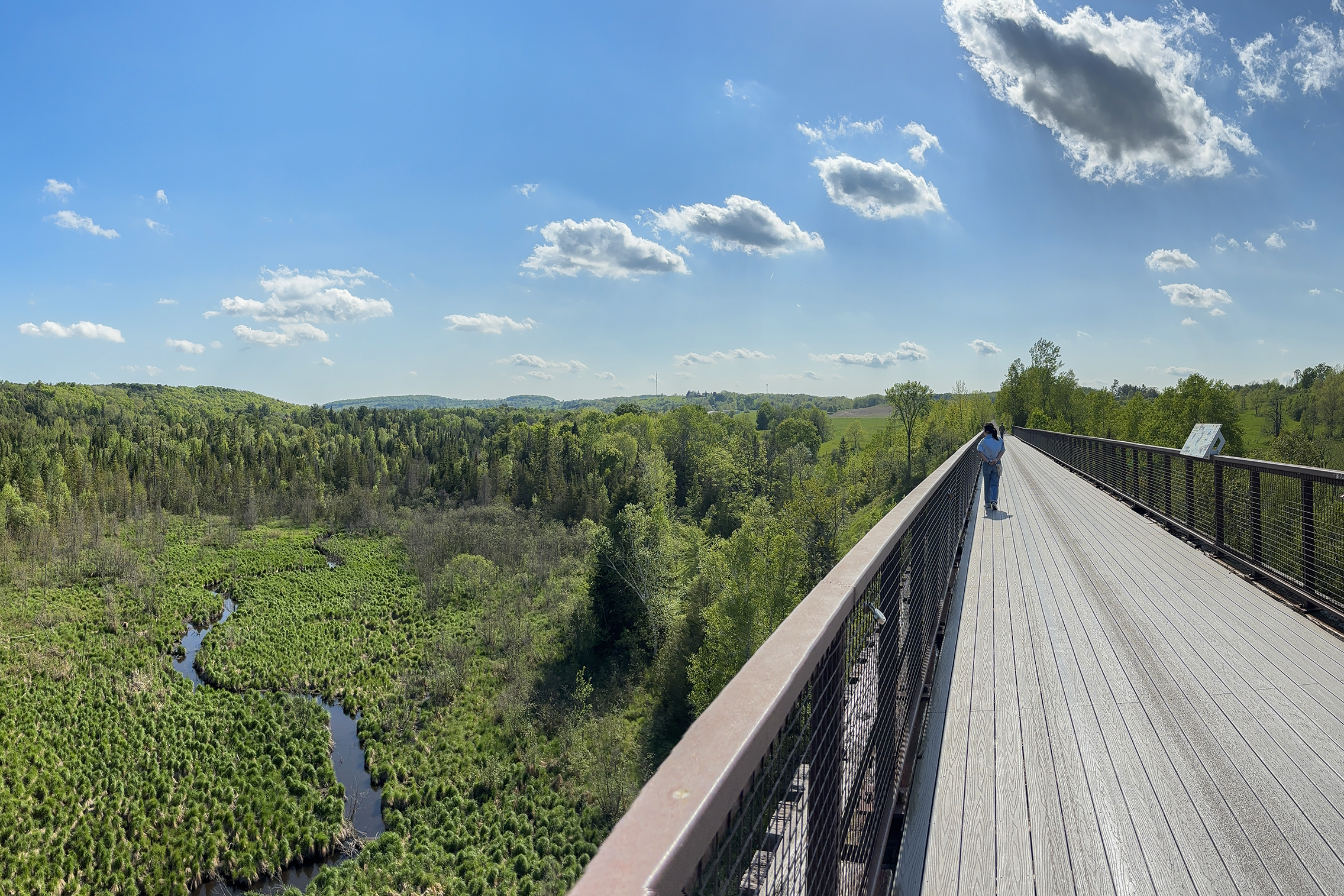
Doube's Trestle bridge

Many of the attractions in Kawartha Lakes are in a curated trail, made in 2017 dedicated to local arts, businesses and cultural heritage around the city, with it being called the “Kawartha Lakes Arts and Heritage Trail”.

- Flato Academy Theatre
- Lindsay Little Theatre
- The Grove Theatre, Fenelon Falls
- Kawartha Art Gallery
- Maryboro Lodge: The Fenelon Museum
- Boyd Museum, Bobcaygeon
- Ganaraska Hiking Trail
- Trans-Canada Trail, and Doube's Trestle Bridge
- Victoria Rail Trail Corridor (Bethany to Haliburton via Lindsay and Fenelon Falls)
- Lindsay Airport, Lindsay
- Youngtown Rock and Roll Museum
- Kawartha Lakes Museum (formerly the Old Gaol Museum)
- Highland Cinema and Museum, Kinmount
- Trent-Severn Waterway
  - Lock 32: Bobcaygeon
  - Lock 33: Lindsay
  - Lock 34: Fenelon Falls
  - Lock 35: Rosedale
  - Lock 36: Kirkfield lift lock

=== Protected areas ===
- Queen Elizabeth II Wildlands Provincial Park
- Carden Alvar Provincial Park
- Balsam Lake Provincial Park
- Indian Point Provincial Park
- Emily Provincial Park
- Pigeon River Headwaters Conservation Area
- Fleetwood Creek Conservation Area
- Windy Ridge Conservation Area
- Ken Reid Conservation Area
- Gamiing Nature Centre

=== Municipal parks ===
- Bobcaygeon Beach Park, Bobcaygeon
- Garnet Graham Beach and Park, Fenelon Falls (Splash Pad)
- Logie Park, Lindsay (Splash Pad)
- Centennial Park and Beach, Verulam, Ancona Point
- Tommy Anderson Park, Bobcaygeon (Splash Pad)
- Memorial Park, Lindsay (Train themed park with disc golf course)
- Victoria Park, Lindsay (Historic Band Shelter and Armoury)
- Elgin Park, Lindsay (Splash Pad)
- Coboconk Lions Park, Coboconk (Amphitheater)
- Wilson Fields, Lindsay (Soccer, Tennis and Baseball playing facilities)
- Omemee Beach Park, Omemee
- Emily Tract, Cowan’s Bay (Forest and Trails)
- Somerville Tract, Burnt River (Forest and Trails)

== Transportation ==
=== Air transportation ===
Kawartha Lakes Municipal Airport, a Transport Canada certified airport, has 24-hour radio operated lighting and provides access to key points throughout Ontario. Kawartha Lakes Municipal Airport is located one nautical mile west north west of Lindsay. It offers a card lock fuel system and can be used by both private and commercial airplanes.

=== Water transportation ===
Towns and villages in Kawartha Lakes are interconnected by rivers, lakes and streams that can be best navigated May to October. The Trent-Severn Waterway, which extends from Bay of Quinte on Lake Ontario to Georgian Bay in the north, is part of the waterways in Kawartha Lakes. Five locks, Bobcaygeon 32, Lindsay 33, Fenelon Falls 34, Rosedale 35, and Kirkfield 36 are part of the Trent-Severn National Historic site and operated by Parks Canada. Coboconk is noted as being Canada's fresh water summit with waters flowing two different directions. It is the highest navigable point in Canada from which it is possible to reach the world. There are no water taxis operating in Kawartha Lakes. Boat and houseboat rentals are available.

=== Land transportation ===
The following King's Highways pass through the city:

- Highway 7, part of the Trans-Canada Highway
- Highway 7A
- Highway 35
- Highway 115
- Highway 7B also exists entirely within the city, following the length of Kent Street through Lindsay, and cosigning with Highway 35 for 800 m.

The following multi-use trails pass through the city:

- Lindsay-Peterborough (east-west) rail line, part of the Trans Canada Trail
- Bethany-Haliburton (north-south) rail line, known as the Victoria Rail Trail

=== Public transportation ===
Because of the largely rural composition of the City of Kawartha Lakes, public transportation is very limited. Kawartha Lakes has public bus transit in the town of Lindsay only (known as Lindsay Transit), running four lines of hourly service Monday to Saturday from 7am to 7pm, and Sunday from 9am to 4pm (except holidays).

On June 21, 2015 a pilot project rural bus route serving part of City of Kawartha Lakes ended service. The rural bus stopped in Lindsay, Dunsford, Bobcaygeon, Fenelon Falls, and Cameron, but it has been thought of and is excepting to be done as early as 2028, and as late as 2041.

Most school children are bussed to elementary and high school.

==== Bus companies ====
TOK Coachlines (formerly called CanAr Bus Lines) offers service between Toronto and Haliburton with several stops in City of Kawartha Lakes, however this service will be discontinued on January 31, 2024.

=== Train routes ===
The last Canadian National Railway (CN) train to run through City of Kawartha Lakes was on the Lindsay - Uxbridge line which ceased operation in 1990. The last passenger train to run through the City of Kawartha Lakes was No. 189 with Budd Car VIA 6104 from Havelock to Toronto Union Station over Canadian Pacific Railway (CP) lines on January 14, 1990.

CP freight trains continue to operate through the City of Kawartha Lakes on the Havelock Subdivision (MP 133.23 - MP 143.22) which passes through Pontypool (MP 139.1)

High-level discussions organized by the Shining Waters Railway continue about returning passenger rail-service to the Midtown Toronto to Havelock line with a stop in Pontypool.

The Trans Canada Trail which is situated on the old rail line from Uxbridge, continues to be a possibility for commuter service to Toronto and Pearson Airport, from the Highway 7 bridge via Uxbridge and the GO Transit Stouffville Line.

==== Taxi services ====
There are several private taxi services in Kawartha Lakes licensed by the local government.

==== Car/van pools ====
Several businesses and organizations offer car and van pooling through Car Pool World including Sir Sandford Fleming College.

== Media ==
- Kawartha Lakes Weekly (published weekly in print and online throughout Kawartha Lakes) is a newspaper that receives general circulation in the area published by the owner of the Lindsay Advocate
- The Standard News (published weekly in print and online throughout Kawartha Lakes and Durham)
- The Lindsay Advocate (online and print news magazine focused on social and economic issues.)
- The Kawartha Promoter (online news magazine published out of Bobcaygeon)
- Y91.9 FM (CKLY-FM) transmits from Lindsay
- Global Peterborough, established as CHEX-TV transmits on Channel 12 from Peterborough
- 100.3 LIFE FM, transmitting at 89.3 from Peterborough
- YourTV (Cogeco), formerly CogecoTV, TV Cogeco, Cogeco Cable, Lindsay Com Cable (The Community Access Channel), transmits from Peterborough
- The Lindsay Post (established in Beaverton as The Canadian Post in 1857, moved to Lindsay in 1861. Ceased publication in 2013.)

== See also ==
- List of secondary schools in Ontario#City of Kawartha Lakes
