= Fenelon Township =

Former township in southern Ontario, Canada

Coordinates: 44°30′14″N 78°47′38″W

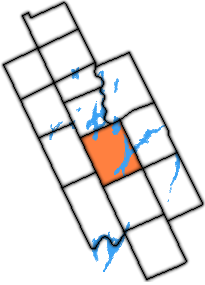
Fenelon Township within Kawartha Lakes

The Township of Fenelon was a municipality in present-day Kawartha Lakes, Ontario, Canada. The township was named after François de Salignac de la Mothe-Fénelon (missionary) (1641–79) who was a missionary in New France, establishing a mission on the Bay of Quinte.

The community of Cambray within the township was named after Cambrai in France, where François Fénelon (1651–1715), younger brother of the missionary, was archbishop.

== Communities ==
- Cameron
- Cambray
- Fenelon Falls
- Long Beach
- Sturgeon Point

== See also ==
- List of townships in Ontario
