= Ontario Highway 46 =

Former Ontario provincial highway

King's Highway 46
- Kawartha Lakes Road 46

Route information
- Maintained by Ministry of Transportation
- Length: 25.7 km (16.0 mi)
- Existed: August 11, 1937–April 1, 1997

Major junctions
- South end: Highway 7 near Manilla
- Road 9 (King Street) in Woodville; Road 8 (Glenarm Road) – Beaverton, Fenelon Falls
- North end: Highway 48 in Bolsover

Location
- Country: Canada
- Province: Ontario
- Counties: Kawartha Lakes
- Villages: Woodville; Argyle; Bolsover

Highway system
- Ontario provincial highways; Current; Former; 400-series
← Highway 40	→ Highway 48
Former provincial highways
← Highway 45	Highway 47 →

King's Highway 46, commonly referred to as Highway 46, was a provincially maintained highway in the Canadian province of Ontario that connected Highway 7 with Highway 48 in Victoria County. The route existed between 1937 and 1997, after which it was decommissioned and transferred to the county. In 2001, Victoria County amalgamated into the city of Kawartha Lakes, and the road became known as Kawartha Lakes Road 46. It is 25.7 kilometres (16.0 mi) long, passing through the villages of Woodville, Argyle and Bolsover.

== Route description ==
Prior to its downloading to the municipal level on April 1, 1997, Highway 46 was a fairly straight highway following the north-south lot boundaries of Victoria County, between the fifth and sixth lots of Mariposa Township and the second and third lots of Eldon Township. It began in the south at a junction with Highway 7 just east of Manilla and approximately 15 kilometres (9.3 mi) west of Lindsay. It progressed north, surrounded mostly by pastureland and the occasional wooded lot. There are few farms surrounding the flat route, as the soils in the region are very thin and underlain by limestone bedrock.

Progressing north, the highway traveled straight for approximately 9 kilometres (5.6 mi) until it entered the village of Woodville, where it encountered Victoria County Road 9 (King Street), onto which it turned westward. After a brief concurrency, Highway 46 branched north and exited the village, back into pasturelands. It traveled straight for another 5 kilometres (3.1 mi), passing through the hamlet of Lorneville midway. At the crossroads of Victoria County Road 8 (Glenarm Road), the route passed through the small hamlet of Argyle. The final 9.7 kilometres (6.0 mi) segment travelled in a straight line through the same surroundings, though it featured more undulated terrain. The highway ended at Highway 48 (Portage Road) in the community of Bolsover.

== History ==
Highway 46 was incorporated into the Ontario provincial highway system on August 11, 1937, running from east of Manilla on Highway 7 northwards to Bolsover, and north-east from there to Coboconk where it ended at Highway 35 with a length of 54.9 km (34.1 mi). Originally unpaved in its entirety, the first 16.0 km (9.9 mi) to Argyle were paved in 1952, followed by the 16.9 km (10.5 mi) to Kirkfield in 1957. A final 4.5 km (2.8 mi) were paved in 1959 to Victoria Road. Its routing prior to 1975 followed the present day Kawartha Lakes Road 48 through Kirkfield, Victoria Road, Corsons, and ended in Coboconk. Before 1963, the route between Victoria Road and Coboconk followed the shores of Balsam Lake, as the lots set out in the surveying of Bexley Township were 2 miles deep, and running a road at the back of the lots would require the maintenance of 38 two-mile driveways.

In the early 1960s, Balsam Lake Provincial Park was announced and located on the northwest shores of the lake. Highway 46 ran along the shore of Balsam Lake on what is now Balsam Lake Drive and North Bay Drive at the time of the announcement, and so it was decided that a new alignment would be built further from the lake to pass the front of the new park. The 10.3 km (6.4 mi) bypass was opened and signed as Highway 46 on June 28, 1967. The designation would last just under a decade. In 1975, the province of Ontario performed a systematic renumbering of its highways, and Highway 46 between Bolsover and Coboconk became a part of Highway 48, truncating Highway 46 to its final length of 25.7 km (16.0 mi).

Budget constraints brought on by a recession in the 1990s resulted in the Mike Harris provincial government forming the Who Does What? committee to determine cost-cutting measures in order to balance the budget after a deficit incurred by former premier Bob Rae. It was determined that many Ontario highways no longer served long-distance traffic movement and should therefore be maintained by local or regional levels of government. The MTO consequently transferred many highways to lower levels of government in 1997 and 1998, removing a significant percentage of the provincial highway network. As Highway 46 generally only served local traffic heading towards cottage country, and not province-wide movement, the route was transferred to Victoria County on April 1, 1997. It was subsequently redesignated as Victoria County Road 46.

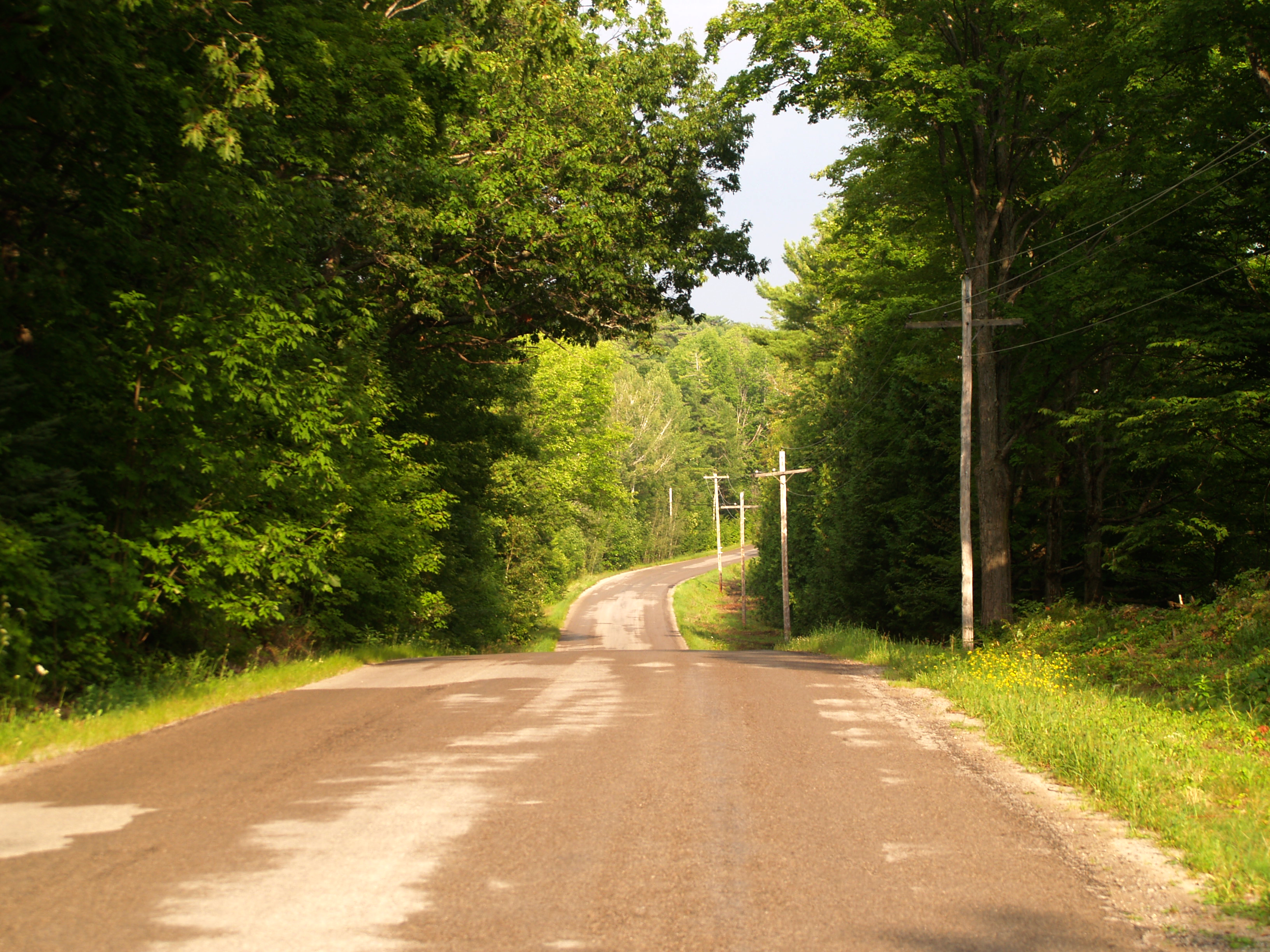
Until June 28, 1967, Highway 46 followed the shores of Balsam Lake. The route was moved inland, and became part of Highway 48 in 1975.

Highway 46 Limited-access King's Highway Former highways

== Major intersections ==
The following table lists the major junctions along Highway 46, as noted by the Ministry of Transportation of Ontario. The entire route was located in Kawartha Lakes.

Location	km	mi	Destinations	Notes
	0.0	0.0	Highway 7 – Lindsay	Trans-Canada Highway
Woodville	9.5	5.9	Road 9 east (King Street)	
Woodville	9.8	6.1	Road 9 west	
Argyle	16.0	9.9	Road 8 – Beaverton, Fenelon Falls	
Bolsover	25.7	16.0	Highway 48 (Portage Road) – Kirkfield, Coboconk	
1.000 mi = 1.609 km; 1.000 km = 0.621 mi
