= Fire services in Kawartha Lakes =

Fire services in Kawartha Lakes, Ontario, Canada are provided by each municipality. There are 20 fire stations across the region.

== Operations ==
=== Lindsay ===
Station 1 - Lindsay Fire Hall consists of one fire hall with one rescue vehicle, one 100' aerial truck and one tanker. The station is as follows:

- Station 1 - 9 Cambridge St. N.

=== Omemee ===
Station 2 - Omemee Fire Hall consists of one fire hall with one pumper, one rescue vehicle and one mini-pumper. The station is also home to a vintage 1949 fire vehicle. The station is as follows:

=== Bobcaygeon ===
Station 3 - Bobcaygeon Fire Hall consists of one fire hall with one pumper and one rescue vehicle. The station is as follows:

- Station 3 - 1 Duke St.

=== Ops ===
Station 4 - Ops Fire Hall consists of one fire hall with one pumper. The station is as follows:

- Station 4 - 2571 Highway 7

=== Dunsford ===
Station 5 - Dunsford Fire Hall consists of one fire hall with one pumper(511) and one tanker(512). The station is as follows:

- Station 5 - 48 Community Center Rd.

=== Emily ===
Station 6 - Emily Township Fire Station consists of one fire hall with one pumper and one rescue vehicle. The station is as follows:

- Station 6 - Centerline & Pigeon Lake Rd.

=== Bethany ===
Station 7 - Bethany Fire Hall consists of one fire hall with one 2017 pumper tanker, and one 1999 pumper. The station is as follows:

- Station 7 - 88 Ski Hill Road

=== Pontypool ===
Station 8 - Pontypool Fire Hall consists of one fire hall with one tanker, one rescue vehicle and one pumper. The station is as follows:

- Station 8 - 6 Bradley St.

=== Janetville ===
Station 9 - Janetville Fire Hall consists of one fire hall with one tanker and one pumper. The station is as follows:

- Station 9 - 669 Janetville Rd.

=== Little Britain ===
Station 10 - Little Britain Fire Hall consists of one fire hall with one pumper-tanker and one pumper-rescue. The station is as follows:

- Station 10 - 1050 Little Britain Rd.

=== Oakwood ===
Station 11 - Oakwood Fire Hall consists of one fire hall with one tanker, one rescue vehicle and one pumper. The station is as follows:

- Station 11 - 972 Eldon Rd.

=== Cameron ===
Station 12 - Cameron Fire Hall consists of one fire hall with one tanker and one pumper. The station is as follows:

- Station 12 - 16 Cameron Rd.

=== Woodville ===
Station 14 - Woodville Fire Hall consists of one fire hall with one tanker, one rescue vehicle and one pumper. The station is as follows:

- Station 14 - 114 Argyle St.

=== Kirkfield ===
Station 15 - Kirkfield Fire Hall consists of one fire hall with one pumper, one tanker and one rescue vehicle. The station is as follows:

- Station 15 - 16 Monroe St.

=== Carden ===
Station 16 - Carden Fire Hall consists of one fire hall with one rescue vehicle. The station is as follows:

- Station 16 - 12 Lake Dalrymple Rd.

=== Norland ===
Station 17 - Norland Fire Hall consists of one fire hall with one tanker, one rescue vehicle and one pumper. The station is as follows:

- Station 17 - 7481 Highway 35

=== Kinmount ===
Station 18 - Kinmount Fire Hall consists of one fire hall with two pumpers. The station is as follows:

- Station 18 - 24 Majestic St.

=== Coboconk ===
Station 19 - Coboconk Fire Hall consists of one fire hall with one rescue vehicle, one pumper and one tanker. The station is as follows:

- Station 19 - 47 Grandy Rd.

=== Burnt River ===
Station 20 - Burnt River Fire Hall consists of one fire hall with one tanker, one pumper, support unit and one off-road vehicle with medical trailer. The station is as follows:

- Station 20 - 186 Burnt River Rd.

=== Fenelon Falls ===
Station 22 - Fenelon Falls Fire Hall consists of one fire hall with one pumper, one tanker and one hydraulic platform. The station is as follows:

- Station 22 - 9 John St.
