= Ontario Highway 48 =

Ontario provincial highway

Highway 48
- Markham Road; 8th Concession Road (pre 1980s)

Route information
- Maintained by Ministry of Transportation
- Length: 65.2 km (40.5 mi)
- Existed: March 24, 1937–present

Major junctions
- South end: Major Mackenzie Drive ( Markham Road continues south)
- East end: Highway 12 near Beaverton

Location
- Country: Canada
- Province: Ontario
- Counties: York; Durham
- Major cities: Markham; Stouffville; East Gwillimbury; Georgina; Brock (Beaverton)

Highway system
- Ontario provincial highways; Current; Former; 400-series
← Highway 41	→ Highway 49
Former provincial highways
← Highway 47

King's Highway 48, also known as Highway 48, is a provincially maintained highway in southern Ontario that extends from Major Mackenzie Drive in Markham, through Whitchurch-Stouffville and East Gwillimbury, to Highway 12 south-east of Beaverton. The route is generally rural and straight, passing near several communities within the Regional Municipality of York. The route is 65.2 kilometres (40.5 mi) long. Most part of the road has a speed limit of 80 km/h (50 mph), except within town limits, where the speed limit is reduced to 60 km/h (37 mph) or 50 km/h (31 mph).

Highway 48 was first designated in 1937 to connect Port Bolster with Highway 12 in Beaverton. It was extended south to meet with Highway 401 in the 1950s in anticipation of a planned freeway connection around the eastern shore of Lake Simcoe that ultimately became Highway 404. In the mid-1970s, Highway 48 assumed a portion of the route of Highway 46 in Victoria Country, now the city of Kawartha Lakes, extending the route to Highway 35 in Coboconk. Between then and 1998, the route was 128 km (80 mi). However, on January 1, 1998 the province transferred the responsibility of maintaining the southern and northern sections to the regional governments that those sections lie within.

== Route description ==
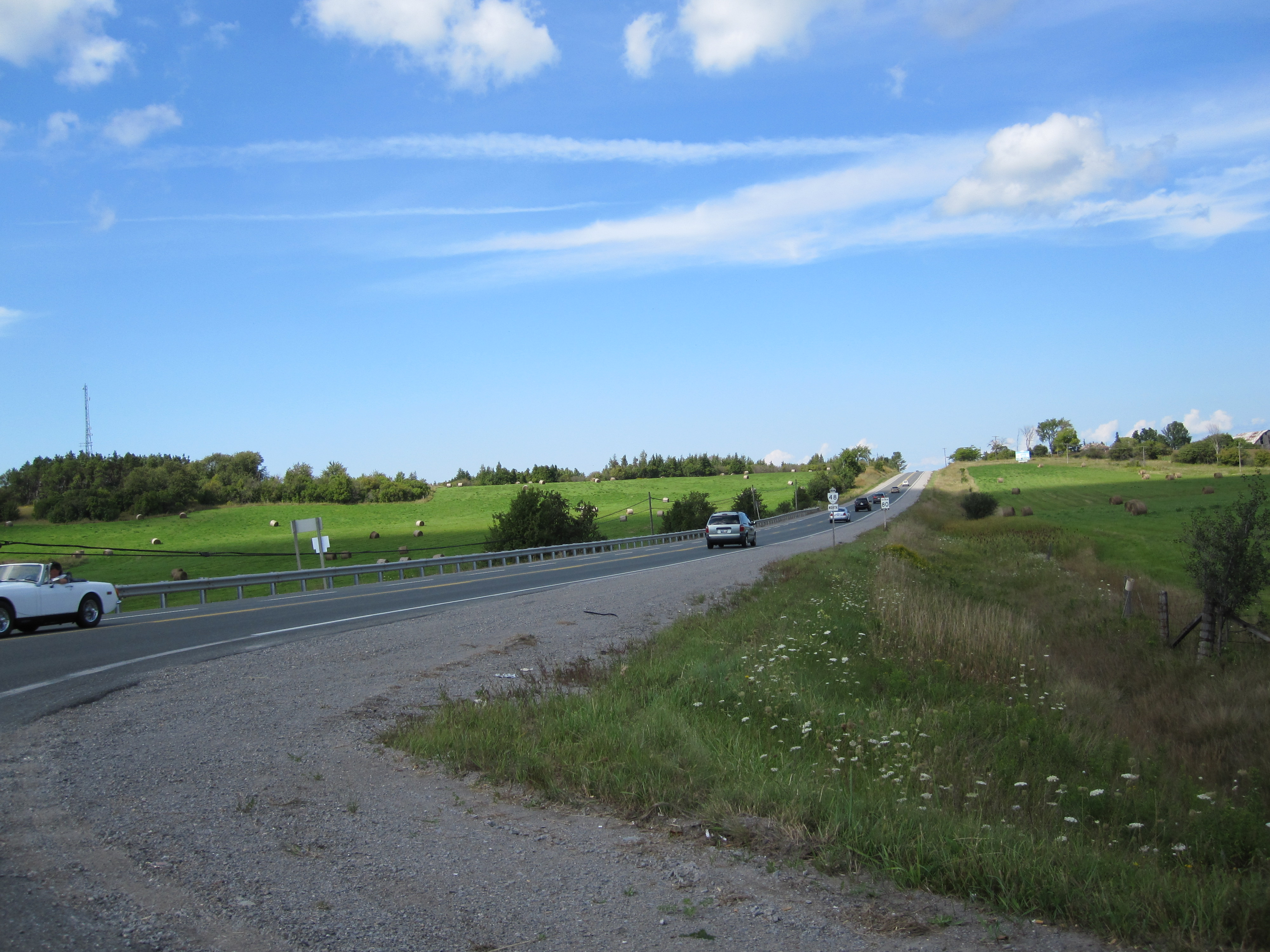
Looking northbound on Highway 48 at Old Homestead Road.

Highway 48 is an L-shaped route, travelling north through York Region to the southern shores of Lake Simcoe before turning east towards Highway 12. The route is 65.2 kilometres (40.5 mi) long and travels through the municipalities of Markham, Whitchurch-Stouffville, East Gwillimbury, Georgina, and Brock.

Beginning at Major Mackenzie Drive (York Regional Road 25), the route progresses northward from the rural–urban fringe of the Greater Toronto Area into farmland. A future extension of Donald Cousens Parkway will bypass former Highway 48 (Main Street) through downtown Markham in 2018 just north of Major Mackenzie. The route travels northward for 34 km (21 mi) along the 8th concession of York Region (Yonge Street being the 1st) to just south of Regional Road 32 (Ravenshoe Road), intersecting with Elgin Mills Road, former Highway 47 (Stouffville Road and Bloomington Road), York Regional Road 15 (Aurora Road), York Regional Road 74 (Vivian Road), York Regional Road 31 (Davis Drive), York Regional Road 13 (Mount Albert Road) and Queensville Sideroad along the way.

North of Ravenshoe Road, the highway diverts onto the boundary between York and Durham through the community of Baldwin before jogging east at York Regional Road 79 (Old Homestead Road). Just south of Sutton, the route curves east, meeting York Regional Road 9 (High Street), which travels into the town. Despite that the highway is now travelling directly east, directional signs still reference the direction of this highway as north. Passing through Virginia and approximately a kilometre inland from Lake Simcoe, the highway passes through a moderately developed area, with frequent businesses lining the route. It passes south of Duclos Point Provincial Nature Reserve prior to meeting Durham Regional Road 23 (Lake Ridge Road) south of Port Bolster, where it crosses from the Regional Municipality of York to the Regional Municipality of Durham. The highway jogs northeastward several kilometres to align with the former Brock–Thorah township line, crossing alongside a power transmission corridor several times along this segment. The final section travels eastward to Highway 12, south of Beaverton and west of Cannington and Woodville.

The route is mostly rural, passing around the urban areas of Stouffville and south of Sutton. However, the east–west section that lies to the south of Lake Simcoe is slightly developed and features a lower speed limit of 60 km/h (37 mph). The remainder of the route is signed at 80 km/h (50 mph). Like other provincial routes in Ontario, Highway 48 is maintained by the Ministry of Transportation of Ontario. In 2010, traffic surveys conducted by the ministry showed that on average, 13,300 vehicles used the highway daily along the 6.0-kilometre (3.7 mi) section between York Regional Road 25 (Major Mackenzie Drive) and York Regional Road 14 (Stouffville Road) while 5,950 vehicles did so each day along the 5.8-kilometre (3.6 mi) section between Durham Regional Road 23 (Lake Ridge Road) and Brock Side Road 17 (former Highway 12), the highest and lowest counts along the highway, respectively.

== History ==
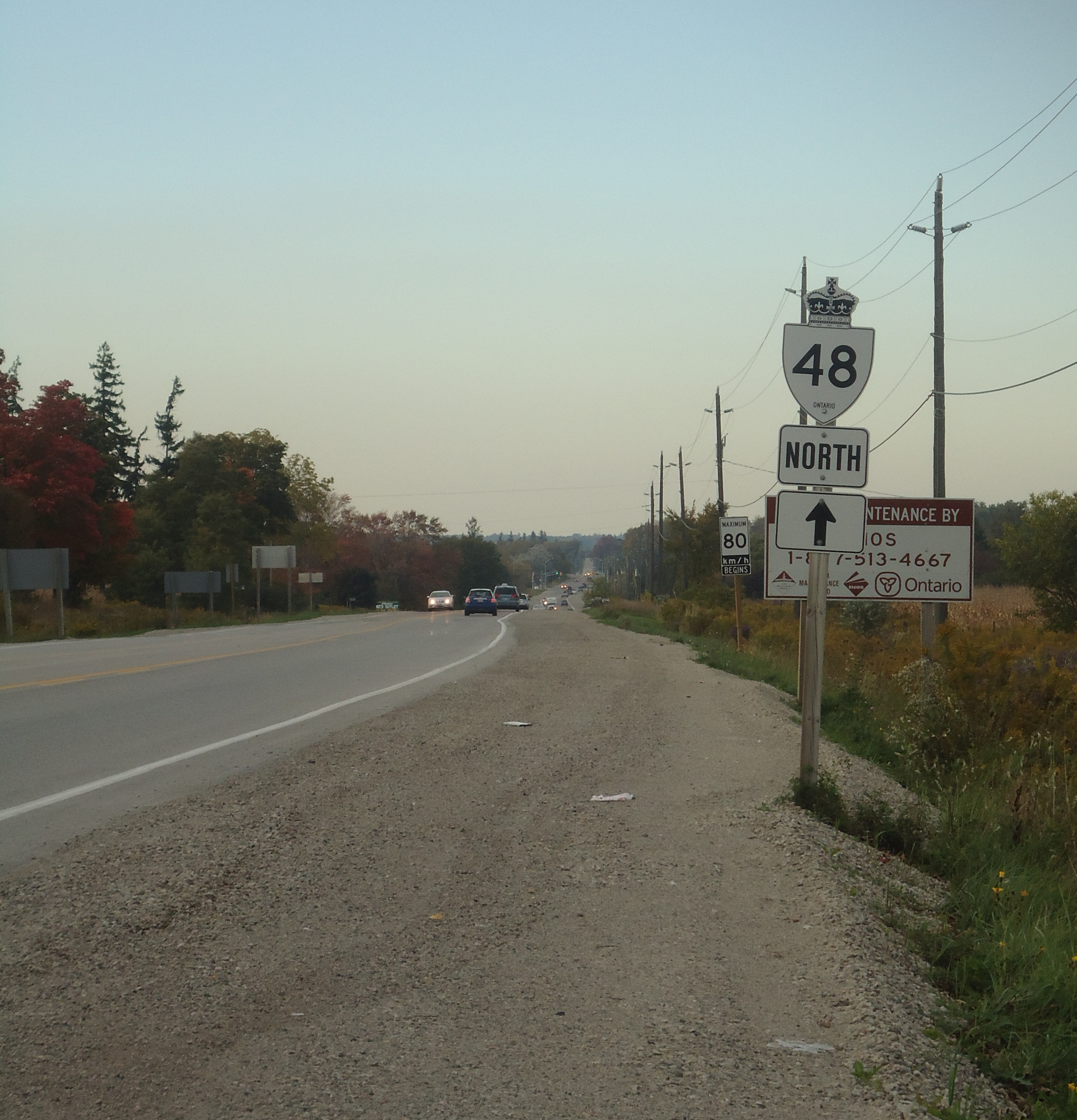
Highway 48 begins at the rural–urban fringe of Markham and progresses north into the Oak Ridges Moraine

Highway 48 incorporates a significant portion of the former Scarborough and Markham Plank Road, now known as Markham Road, into its length. This section was not incorporated into the highway until 1954, yet predates the Highway 48 designation entirely.

Markham Road began as the eighth concession east of Yonge Street in the Home District of Upper Canada, and was blazed by settlers to whom land had been granted along the right-of-way. The right-of-way extended from Lake Ontario in the south to what is today York Region Road 8A (Baseline Road) in Sutton, just south of Lake Simcoe, in the north. Improvements to the road and the necessary funds were authorized by an act of the Upper Canada provincial parliament on February 13, 1833 for the section in Scarborough township between Danforth Road (present day Painted Post Drive) and the Eighth Concession at the border with Markham township. These improvements were supervised by residents Peter Secor, Richard Houck and Robert Armstrong. By 1847, the section between Scarborough and Markham had become known as the Scarborough and Markham Road. On July 28 of that year, the parliament of the Province of Canada passed an act to establish the Scarborough and Markham Plank-road Company, which was authorized to further improve the road surface to macadamized or planked construction between Kingston Road in Scarborough and Markham Village in the north, and further north and then east to Stouffville along the Markham-Stouffville township line, a line then formed between today's Stouffville Road and Main Street Stouffville. The company was allowed to erect gates and charge tolls to pay for the work.

The cloverleaf interchange with Highway 401 prior to the suburbanization of Scarborough

On March 24, 1937, the 9.6 km (6.0 mi) gravel road between Beaverton and Port Bolster, known as the Port Bolster Road, was assumed by the Department of Highways; it was paved in 1947. On February 10, 1954, the highway designation was extended 82 km (51 mi) south to the future site of Highway 401 in Scarborough — though not all the way to the then-Highway 2 (Kingston Road) — where a cloverleaf interchange was constructed in anticipation of it developing into a freeway around the eastern side of Lake Simcoe; Highway 404 was constructed for this purpose, but along or parallel to Woodbine Avenue instead. In 1962, the highway was extended to Highway 46 at Bolsover via a concurrency with Highway 12 north from Beaverton. This routing would last until November 4, 1966, when the 10.3 km (6.4 mi) Beaverton Bypass opened, routing Highway 12 to the east. A new road was opened connecting Highway 48 south of Port Bolster with the bypass on the same day, and both Highway 12 and Highway 48 were rerouted. Portions of the former route of Highway 48 and Highway 12 were renumbered as Highway 48B. However, the segment between Port Bolster and what is now Brock Sideline 17 was decommissioned entirely. The original route of Highway 48, prior to 1954, is now part of Durham Regional Road 23. The portion of Highway 48 within Scarborough, between Highway 401 and Steeles Avenue, was transferred to Metropolitan Toronto on September 28, 1963.

An abandoned section of Highway 48 lies west of Coboconk

On June 28, 1967, the routing of Highway 46 was shifted in the vicinity of Balsam Lake on to a new inland bypass; the old route became known as West Bay Drive. On 1975, Highway 46 was truncated at Bolsover; the severed section was renumbered as an extension of Highway 48, bringing it to its peak length of 129.2 km (80.3 mi). The new section of highway between Highway 12 and Bolsover was reconstructed over the following year, opening to traffic on August 19, 1976.

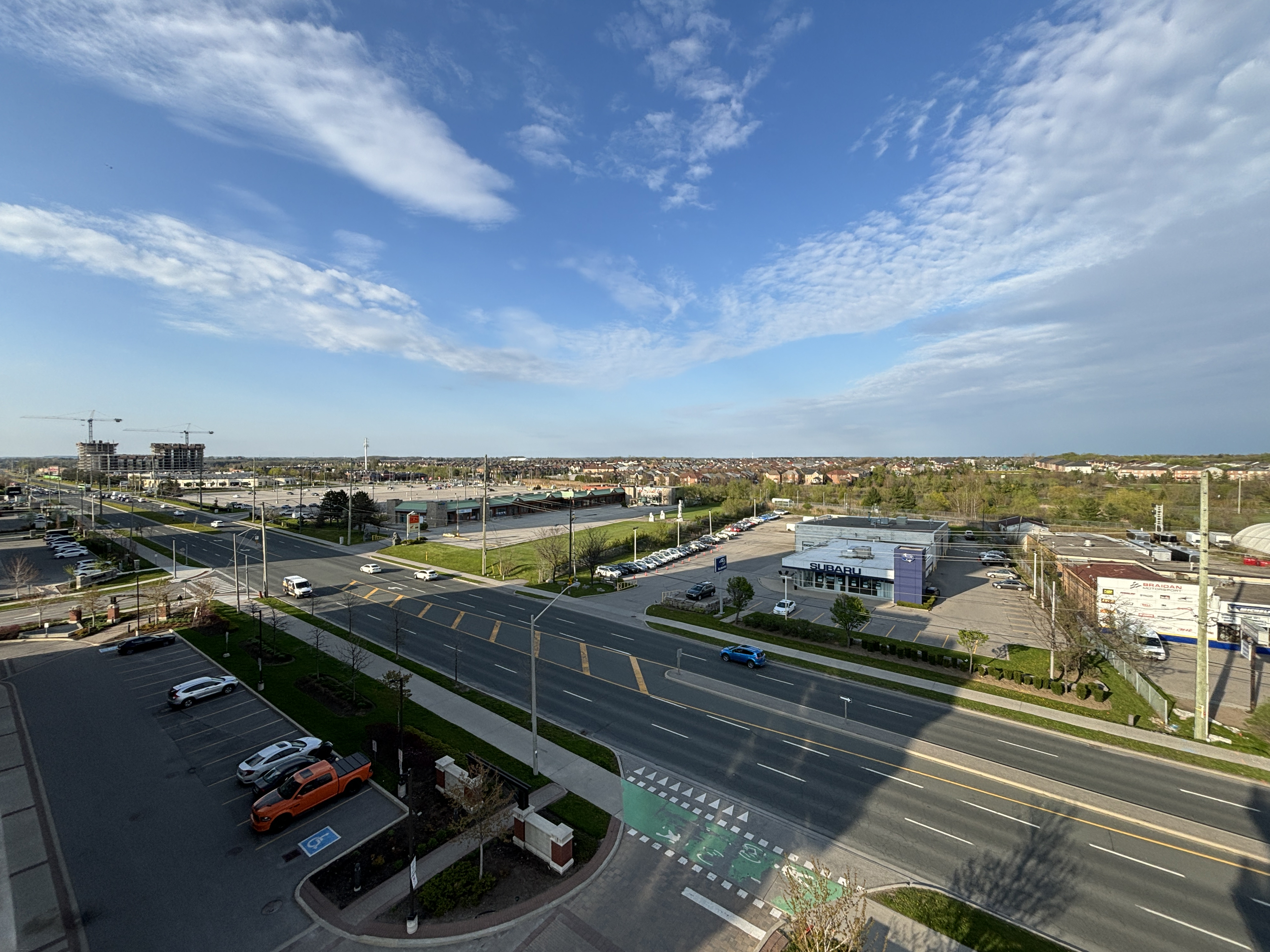
York Regional Road 68 near Mount Joy GO Station

The section between Highway 401 and the then-unopened Highway 407 interchange was turned over to the Region of York and the City of Toronto on April 1, 1995, and is known as Markham Road south of Highway 407, and Main Street thereafter to Sixteenth Avenue, where the name Markham Road resumes for 2 km (1.2 mi) until Major Mackenzie Drive. The section within York Region is also designated as York Regional Road 68.

On January 1, 1998, the section of Highway 48 between its southern junction with Highway 12 and Coboconk was transferred to the Regional Municipality of Durham and Victoria County (now Kawartha Lakes), removing the concurrency with Highway 12 in the process. The section from Highway 12 to Highway 35 is now known as Portage Road and signed as Durham Regional Highway 48 and Kawartha Lakes Road 48.

== Major intersections ==
The following table lists the major junctions along Highway 48, as noted by the Ministry of Transportation of Ontario.

Division	Location	km	mi	Destinations	Notes
Toronto		−14.1	−8.8	Markham Road (continues south) Highway 401	Former Highway 48 southern terminus (pre-1998); Highway 401 exit 383
Toronto–York boundary	Toronto–Markham boundary	−8.3	−5.2	Steeles Avenue York Regional Road 68 begins	
York	Markham	−5.3	−3.3	407 ETR	Highway 407 exit 92
York	Markham	−4.0	−2.5	Regional Road 7 (Highway 7)	Formerly Highway 7
York	Markham	0.0	0.0	Regional Road 25 (Major Mackenzie Drive East) Highway 48 begins York Regional Road 68 ends	Highway 48 southern terminus
York	Markham	1.0	0.62	Regional Road 48 (Donald Cousens Parkway)	Proposed Donald Cousens Parkway extension
York	Whitchurch-Stouffville	6.0	3.7	Regional Road 14 west (Stouffville Road); Main Street – Stouffville	Formerly Highway 47 (1954-1992)
York	Whitchurch-Stouffville	10.1	6.3	Regional Road 40 (Bloomington Road)	Former signalized intersection converted to roundabout in 2018; formerly Highway 47 (1993-1998)
York	Whitchurch-Stouffville	14.3	8.9	Regional Road 15 (Aurora Road) – Ballantrae	
York	Whitchurch-Stouffville	18.5	11.5	Regional Road 74 (Vivian Road) – Vivian	
York	Whitchurch-Stouffville–East Gwillimbury boundary	20.5	12.7	Regional Road 31 (Davis Drive)	
York	East Gwillimbury	24.4	15.2	Regional Road 13 (Mount Albert Road) – Mount Albert	
York	East Gwillimbury–Georgina boundary	34.7	21.6	Regional Road 32 (Ravenshoe Road) – Brown Hill	
York	Georgina	40.6	25.2	Regional Road 79 (Old Homestead Road)	
York	Georgina	43.4	27.0	Regional Road 9 north (High Street) – Sutton	
York	Georgina	46.0	28.6	Regional Road 18 (Park Road) – Sibbald Point Provincial Park	
York	Georgina	51.2	31.8	Duclos Point Road	Virginia; access to Duclos Point Nature Reserve
York	Georgina	54.4	33.8	Regional Road 21 south (Pefferlaw Road) – Pefferlaw	
York–Durham boundary	Georgina–Brock boundary	57.0	35.4	Regional Road 23 (Lake Ridge Road) – Port Bolster, Beaverton	
Durham	Brock	65.2	40.5	Highway 12 south / TCH – Whitby	Highway 48 eastern terminus; former western end of Highway 12 concurrency
Durham	Brock	77.9	48.4	Highway 12 north / TCH – Orillia Durham Regional Highway 48 begins	Former eastern end of Highway 12 concurrency
Durham–Kawartha Lakes boundary	Brock–Kawartha Lakes boundary	84.5	52.5	Durham Regional Highway 48 ends Kawartha Lakes Road 48 begins	
Kawartha Lakes		87.5	54.4	Road 46 south – Woodville	Formerly Highway 46 south
Kawartha Lakes		113.8	70.7	Highway 35 – Lindsay, Minden	Former Highway 48 eastern terminus
1.000 mi = 1.609 km; 1.000 km = 0.621 mi: Closed/former; Proposed; Route transition
