= Four Mile Lake (Ontario) =

Lake in southern Ontario, Canada

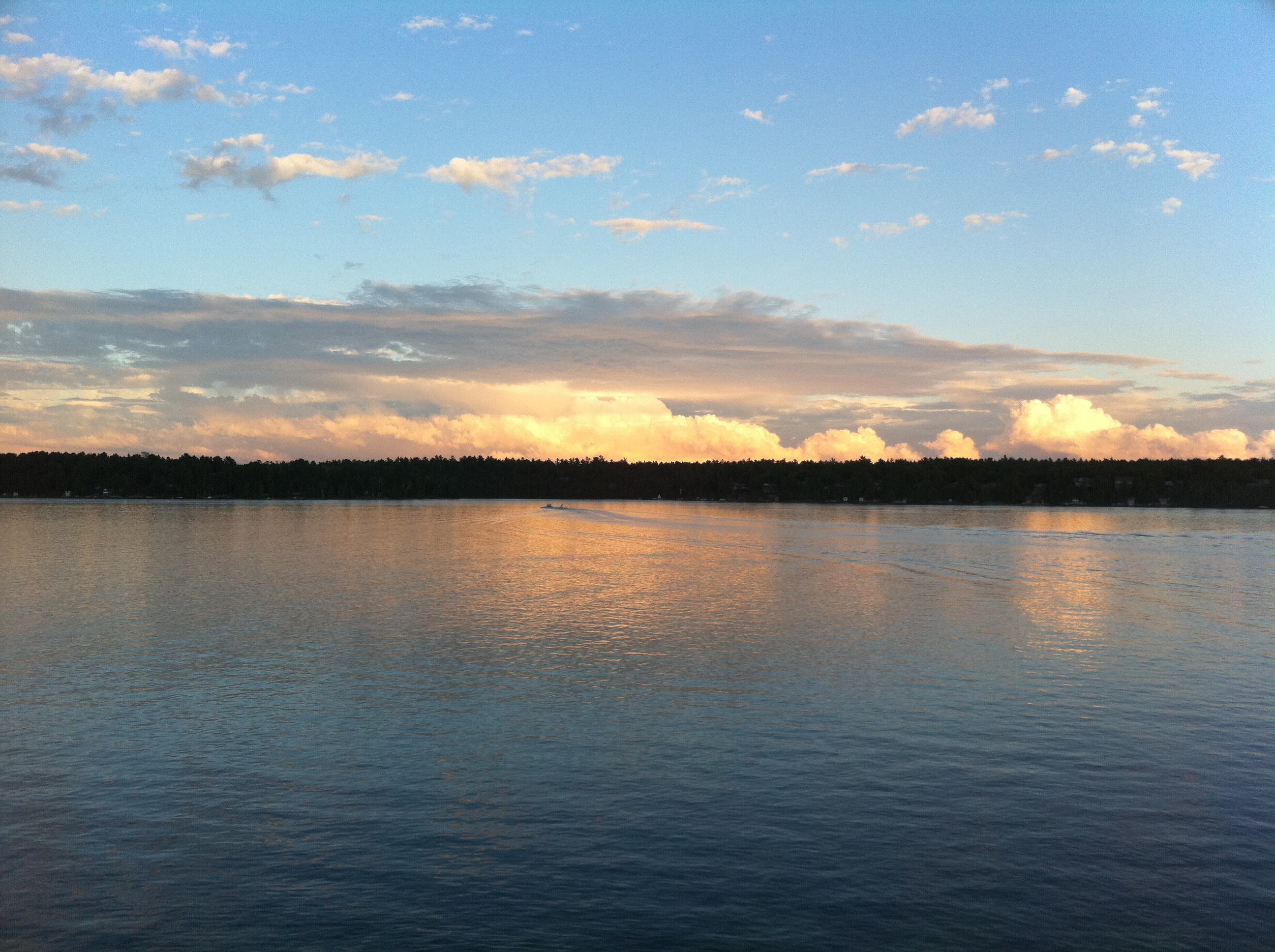
- Four Mile Lake at sunset

- Location of the lake in Southern Ontario
- Location: Kawartha Lakes, Ontario
- Group: Kawartha Lakes (Ontario)
- Coordinates: 44°40′54″N 78°44′14″W
- Part of: Great Lakes Basin
- Primary inflows: Corben Creek
- Primary outflows: Corben Creek
- Basin countries: Canada
- Max. length: 6.05 km (3.76 mi)
- Max. width: 1.6 km (0.99 mi)
- Surface area: 786 hectares (1,940 acres)
- Average depth: 8.8 metres (29 ft)
- Max. depth: 19.2 metres (63 ft)
- Residence time: 5 years
- Surface elevation: 270 metres (890 ft)

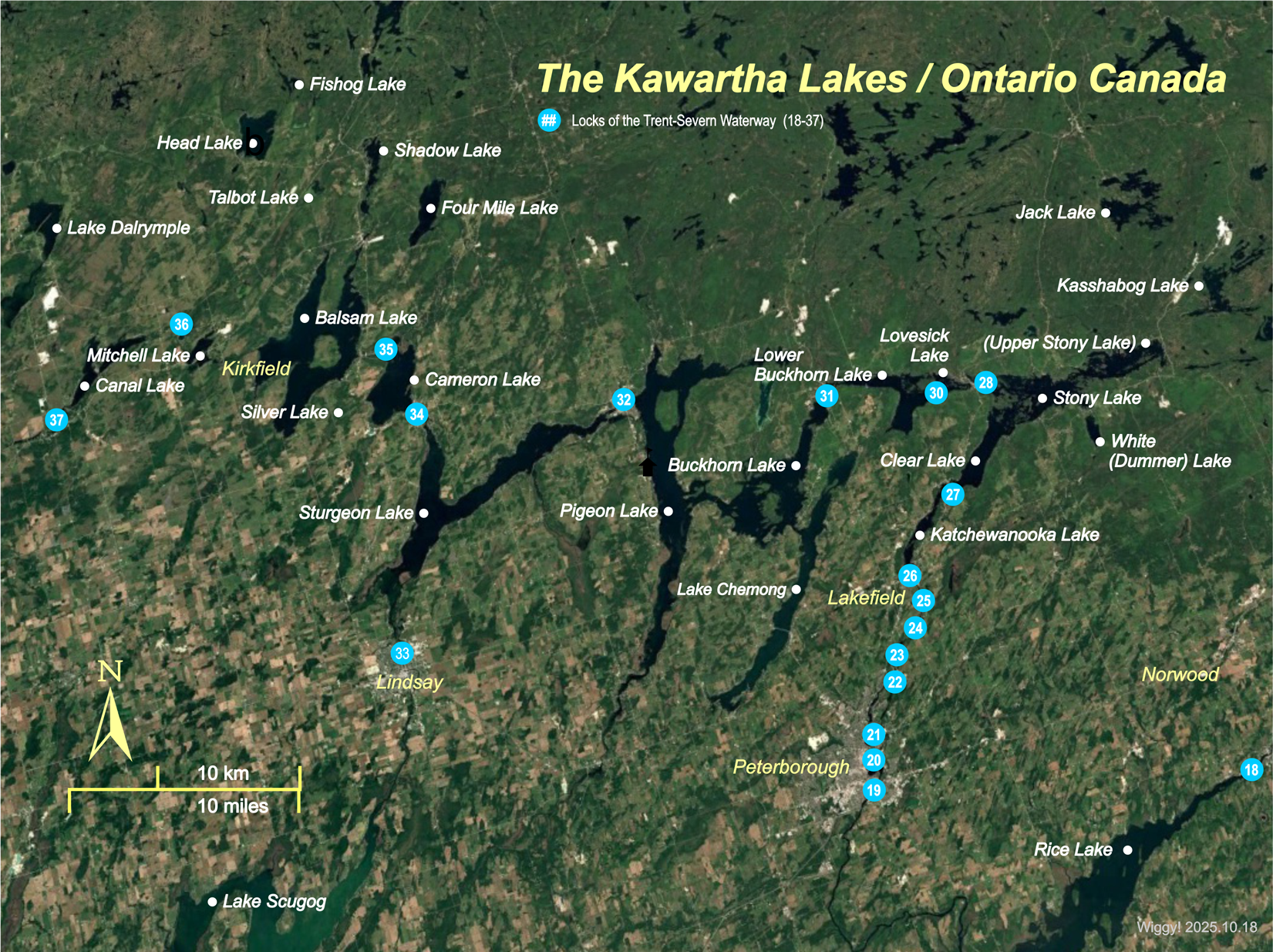
The Kawartha Lakes and the Trent Severn Waterway; Four Mile Lake in the upper left quadrant

Four Mile Lake is a lake in the city of Kawartha Lakes in Central Ontario, Canada. The lake is 3.56 kilometres (2.21 mi) northeast of Coboconk, Ontario and 2.08 kilometres (1.29 mi) west of Burnt River. It is one of the Kawartha Lakes series of lakes and is in the Great Lakes Basin.

== Geography and Geology ==
Four Mile Lake is a relatively shallow warm water lake with a surface area of 786 hectares (1,940 acres). The lake is located in the sub watershed of Corben Creek and has a flushing rate of approximately five years. The lake is located on the boundary between two different geological land forms. The northern one-third of the lake is located on the Canadian Shield and is characterized by granite shorelines. The southern two-thirds of the lake is located on the Corden plain and is characterized by sedimentary limestone cliffs along the shoreline.

Four Mile Lake is a closed lake system with no navigable access to other lakes. The lake provides a community to approximately 450 cottages and homes.

Four Mile Lake is located near a rare biological environment phenomenon known as alvars.

== Roads and services ==
Electricity is serviced to all properties on Four Mile Lake by Hydro One and telephone is serviced by Bell Canada. Numerous cellular telephone services are also available. Both dial-up and wireless high speed internet services are available. Television is available over the air or by satellite.

The majority of the lake is accessed by private four season roads which are owned and maintained by the cottage owners. Shopping is available in Coboconk, Fenelon Falls, Kinmount, and Bobcaygeon.

== Summer recreation ==
The lake has rocky shores and is relatively calm throughout most of the summer. A public boat launch is operated throughout limited hours to provide boat access to the lake. Boat traffic is usually moderate, and popular activities include water-skiing, wake-boarding, wake-chairing, tubing, and fishing. Numerous species of fish can be found in the lake, including brown bullhead, lake herring, largemouth bass, muskellunge, pumpkinseed, rock bass, smallmouth bass, white sucker, yellow perch, and walleye.

== Winter recreation ==
The lake is usually frozen over from mid December to early April. Winter activities include ice skating, ice fishing, snowmobiling, and tobogganing. The Ontario Federation of Snowmobile Clubs maintains snowmobile trails in the area, which can be accessed from feeder trails at the east side of the lake.

== See also ==
- List of lakes in Ontario
