= Bolsover, Ontario =

Coordinates: 44°31′45″N 79°03′40″W

Bolsover is a village in Kawartha Lakes, Ontario, Canada, west of the village of Kirkfield at the junction of Kawartha Lakes Road 48 and Kawartha Lakes Road 46. The village is located to the south of Canal Lake. The community is likely named for Bolsover in Derbyshire, England.

== History ==
By 1869, Bolsover was a village with a population of 150 in the township of Eldon, County Victoria. It was established on the Talbot River. It was on the line of the proposed Toronto and Nipissing Railway. There was a stagecoach service to Woodville. The average price of land was $5 to $16.

== Sports ==
Bolsover is home to the Western Trent Golf Club.

== Notable residents ==
Dave Devall, well-known former meteorologist who worked for the television station CFTO-TV (CTV Toronto) in Toronto, Ontario, Canada, resides in Bolsover.
