= Vardi Nature Reserve =

Protected area in Estonia

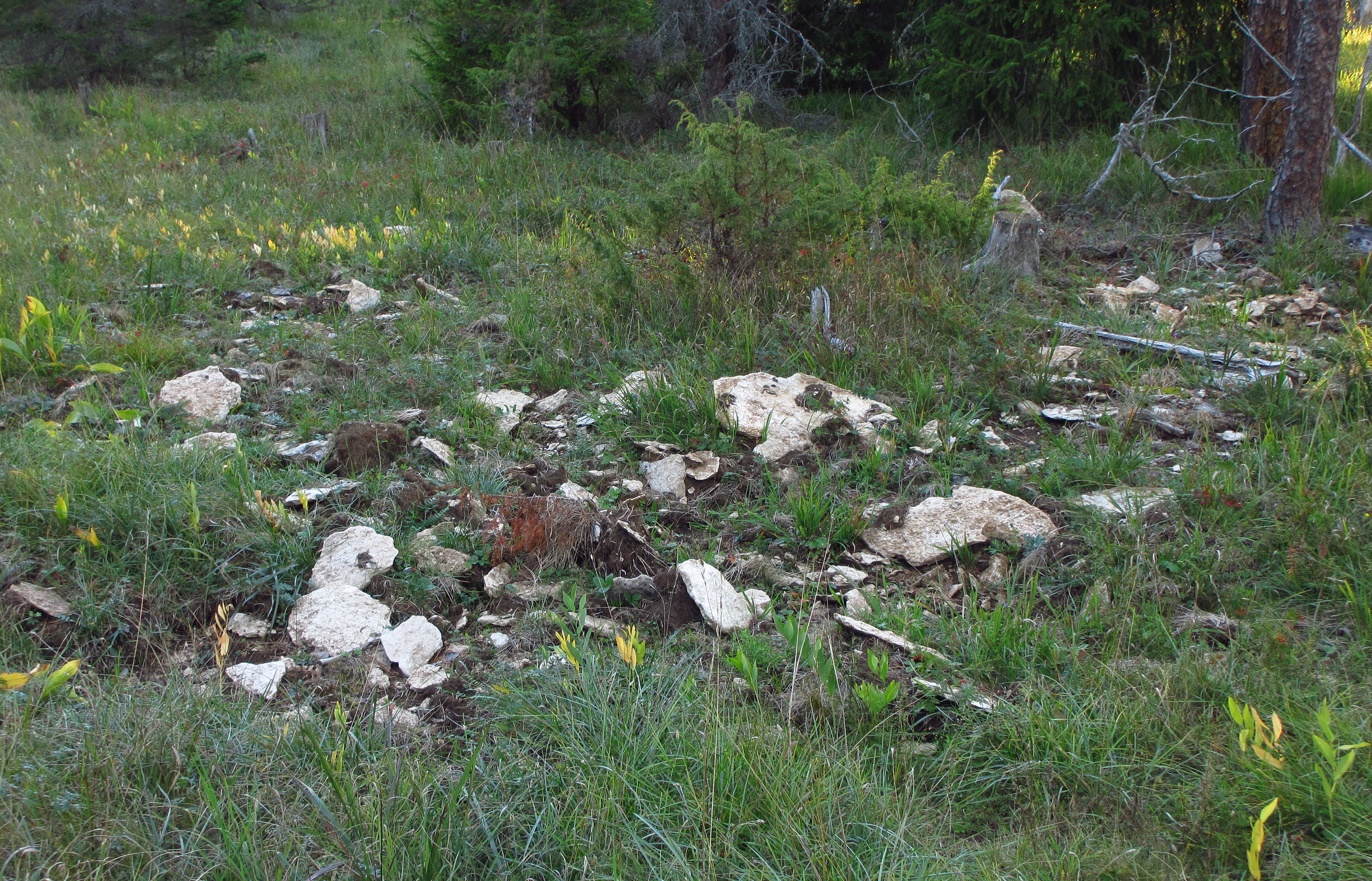

- Location within Estonia
- Location: Estonia
- Nearest city: Rapla
- Coordinates: 59°00′52″N 24°27′06″E
- Area: 299 ha (740 acres)

Vardi Nature Reserve is a nature reserve in Rapla County in central Estonia.

Vardi nature reserve encompasses one of the few remaining alvar forests in Estonia, an unusual landscape type today as cut-down forests normally never recover. The soil in Vardi layer reaches only a maximum of 30 centimetres (12 in), creating a sensitive biotope dominated by pine, juniper, rowan, honeysuckle and a few other species.
