= Misery Bay (Ontario) =

Freshwater bay on Manitoulin Island, Ontario, Canada

- Location within Ontario
- 45°47′23.6″N 82°44′26.9″W
- Location: Manitoulin Island, Ontario, Canada

History
- Founded: 1989

Site notes
- Area: 1,079 ha (4.17 sq mi)
- Governing body: Ontario Parks

Misery Bay is a freshwater bay on Manitoulin Island in Ontario. It is noted for its alvars and large dolomite pavements ground flat by glaciers. It also contains grykes and ecologically significant wetlands.

== History ==
Misery Bay was covered by the Laurentide Ice Sheet 20,000 years ago. It was only exposed 10,000 years ago, with most of the area being inundated with glacial lake water 4,000 years later. The land has been slowly rising since then as it is no longer weighed down by the glacier.

The land surrounding Misery Bay was privately owned, purchased by the Sifferd family in 1959. A visitor's centre was built in 1982, and the land was donated to Ontario Parks in 1989.

== Provincial park ==
In 1989, Ontario created a provincial park containing Misery Bay and the surrounding forests. It covers 1,079 hectares and features 15 km of coastal and inland trails. A volunteer group, the Friends of Misery Bay, runs the visitor centre and maintains the park. Misery Bay is the only provincial park that is entirely volunteer-run.
