= Ontario Highway 47 =

Former Ontario provincial highway

King's Highway 47

Route information
- Maintained by Ministry of Transportation of Ontario
- Length: 34.3 km (21.3 mi)
- Existed: October 20, 1937–January 1, 1998

Major junctions
- West end: Highway 48
- East end: Highway 12

Location
- Country: Canada
- Province: Ontario
- Regions: York; Durham
- Towns: Stouffville; Uxbridge; Scugog

Highway system
- Ontario provincial highways; Current; Former; 400-series
← Highway 40	→ Highway 48
Former provincial highways
← Highway 46

King's Highway 47, commonly referred to as Highway 47 and locally as Bloomington Road, Toronto Street and Brock Street, was a provincially maintained highway in the Canadian province of Ontario. The mostly rural route travelled through the towns of Whitchurch-Stouffville, Goodwood, and Uxbridge on its east–west path between Highway 48 and Highway 12. The route was established in 1937, existing until it was transferred to the Regional Municipality of Durham and the Regional Municipality of York at the beginning of 1998.

== Route description ==
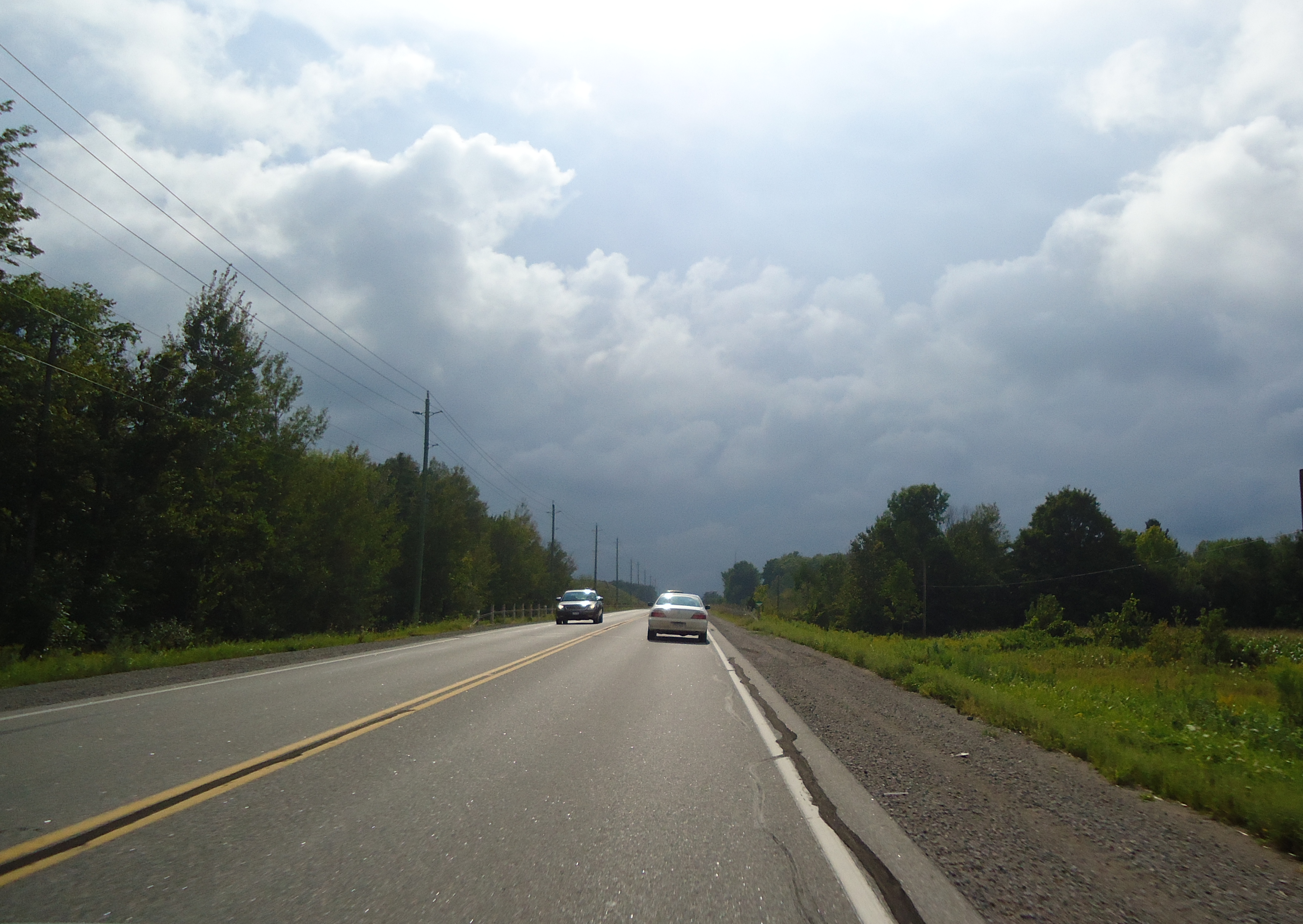
Durham Regional Highway 47 east of Highway 12

At the time of its decommissioning, Highway 47 began at Highway 48, and travelled east through a rural portion of Whitchurch-Stouffville along what is now York Regional Road 40 (Bloomington Road), passing through rolling farmland. Only a decade prior, the highway travelled through the town of Stouffville along Main Street, then turned north along the Tenth line, following it to Bloomington Road and York - Durham Line, where it curved gently into the 1997 routing of the highway. The re-routing served to bypass this urban section.

Within the Regional Municipality of Durham, the route passed through Goodwood, where it curved northeast through forests. The highway then zig-zagged northeast to the town of Uxbridge. East of there, the highway continued through marshes, past Durham Regional Road 23 (Lakeridge Road), and into flat farmland. The route ended at Highway 12 south of Greenbank.

== History ==
The Stouffville to Greenbank Road was first assumed by the Department of Highways as Highway 47 on October 20, 1937, connecting Stouffville and Uxbridge with Highway 12, south of Greenbank. The highway generally remained unchanged for over half a century, with the exception of a short westward extension on February 10, 1954. On that day, the route was extended to meet Highway 48, which was itself extended south to Scarborough. Plans arose in 1990 for the province to take over a section of Bloomington Road being reconstructed by York Region, in order to bypass the urban section of Highway 47 through Stouffville. By 1993, the highway had been shifted north of the town along Bloomington Road instead of Tenth Line and Main Street. The gentle curve at the York–Durham boundary was removed and a signalized intersection created in its place.

Budget constraints brought on by a recession in the 1990s resulted in the Mike Harris provincial government forming the Who Does What? committee to determine cost-cutting measures in order to balance the budget after a deficit incurred by former premier Bob Rae. It was determined that many Ontario highways no longer served long-distance traffic movement and should therefore be maintained by local or regional levels of government. The MTO consequently transferred many highways to lower levels of government in 1997 and 1998, removing a significant percentage of the provincial highway network. As Highway 47 generally only served local traffic heading between Uxbridge and the Greater Toronto Area, and not province-wide movement, the route was transferred to the Regional Municipality of York and the Regional Municipality of Durham on January 1, 1998. It was subsequently redesignated as Durham Regional Highway 47 and an eastward extension of York Regional Road 40.

== Major intersections ==
The following table lists the major junctions along Highway 47, as noted by the Ministry of Transportation of Ontario. This table details the route as it was in 1989, prior to the shifting of the route north of Stouffville.

Division	Location	km	mi	Destinations	Notes
York	Whitchurch–Stouffville	0.0	0.0	Highway 48	Continues west as Stouffville Road
York	Whitchurch–Stouffville	2.1	1.3	Regional Road 69 (Ninth Line)	
York	Whitchurch–Stouffville	4.2	2.6	Regional Road 14	
York		8.6	5.3	Regional Road 40 (Bloomington Road); Regional Road 30 (York–Durham Line)	Bloomington Road travels west while York–Durham Line travels north–south
Durham		8.6	5.3	Regional Road 40 (Bloomington Road); Regional Road 30 (York–Durham Line)	Bloomington Road travels west while York–Durham Line travels north–south
Durham	Goodwood	12.2	7.6	Regional Road 21	
Durham	Uxbridge	17.1	10.6	Regional Road 1 south (Brock Road)	
Durham	Uxbridge	24.5	15.2	Regional Road 8 (Brock Street)	Western junction with Durham Regional Road 8
Durham	Uxbridge	24.7	15.3	Regional Road 8 (Main Street)	Eastern junction with Durham Regional Road 8
Durham	Uxbridge	27.0	16.8	Regional Road 23 (Lakeridge Road)	
Durham	Scugog	34.3	21.3	Highway 7 / Highway 12	
1.000 mi = 1.609 km; 1.000 km = 0.621 mi

== See also ==
- List of numbered roads in Durham Region
- List of numbered roads in York Region
