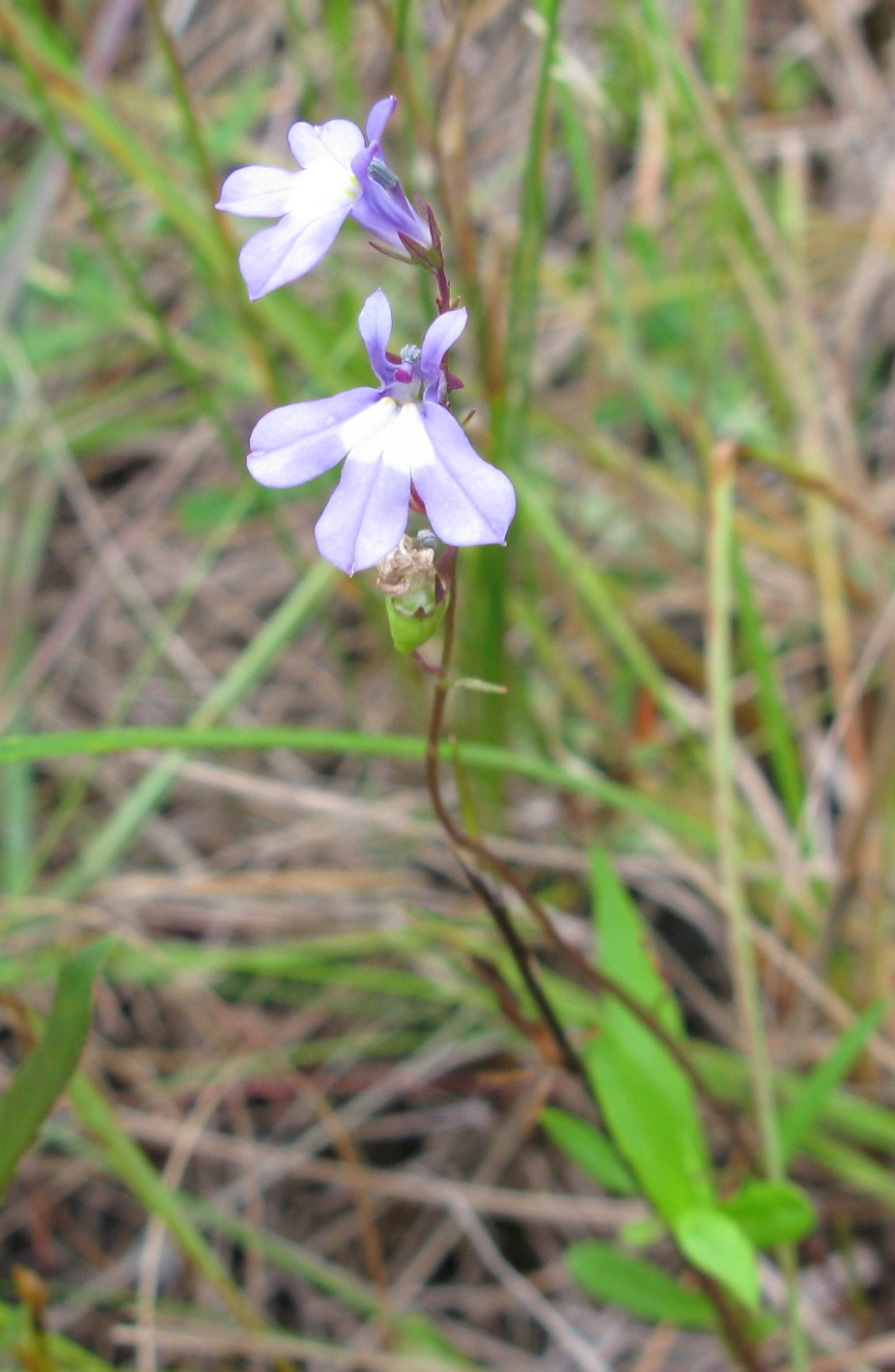
- Lobelia kalmii

Conservation status
- Least Concern (IUCN 3.1)

Scientific classification
- Kingdom: Plantae
- Clade: Tracheophytes
- Clade: Angiosperms
- Clade: Eudicots
- Clade: Asterids
- Order: Asterales
- Family: Campanulaceae
- Genus: Lobelia
- Species: L. kalmii

Binomial name
- Lobelia kalmii L.

= Lobelia kalmii =

Species of flowering plant

Lobelia kalmii is a species of flowering plant with a distribution primarily across Canada and the northern United States in temperate and boreal regions. It was formerly known as Lobelia strictiflora (Rydb.) It is commonly known as Kalm's lobelia, Ontario lobelia and Brook lobelia.

== Description ==
Lobelia kalmii is a small plant (10 – 40 cm) that grows in wet environments such as bogs, wet meadows, and rocky shorelines, including wet alvars, where it grows in calcareous soil or cracks between limestone rocks.

It is a perennial herb that has blue flowers with a white center. It has thin upper leaves and spatulate basal leaves. The plant starts flowering in July and lasts into September.

== Cultivation and uses ==
Although other species of Lobelia are cultivated for ornamental purposes, the small (1 cm) flowers of Lobelia kalmii have not endeared this plant to growers. However, it can be found through on seed exchanges among native plant enthusiasts. Its hardy nature may allow it to produce masses of scattered plants within downspout rock gardens. The plant attracts hummingbirds.

== Traditional use ==
Native Americans used Lobelia to treat respiratory and muscle disorders, and as a purgative. The species used most commonly in modern herbalism is Lobelia inflata (Indian Tobacco).
