= Corben Creek (Ontario) =

- Location of the mouth of the creek in Southern Ontario

Location
- Country: Canada
- Province: Ontario
- Region: Central Ontario
- County: Haliburton
- Municipalities: Kawartha Lakes; Minden Hills

Physical characteristics
- Source: Unnamed lake
  - location: Lutterworth Township, Minden Hills, Haliburton County
  - coordinates: 44°47′01″N 78°44′44″W
  - elevation: 294 m (965 ft)
- Mouth: Balsam Lake
  - location: Somerville Township, Kawartha Lakes
  - coordinates: 44°41′09″N 78°44′48″W
  - elevation: 256.3 m (841 ft)

Basin features
- River system: Great Lakes Basin

Corben Creek is a stream in the municipality of Minden Hills, Haliburton County, and the unitary city of Kawartha Lakes in Central Ontario, Canada. It is in the Great Lakes Basin and is a tributary of Balsam Lake.

== Course ==
The river begins at an unnamed lake in geographic Somerville Township in Minden Hills, about 1.5 kilometres (0.93 mi) south of the community of Buller, and flows south to Corben Lake where it passes into geographic Somerville Township, Kawartha Lakes. It exits Corben lake at its southern tip, continues south, passes under Kawartha Lakes Road 45, and reaches Four Mile Lake, leaving that lake at the south. It turns southwest, flows under Ontario Highway 35, and reaches its mouth at the northeast side of Balsam Lake, about 4.7 kilometres (2.9 mi) north of the community of Rosedale.
