= Alvar =

Limestone-based biological environment

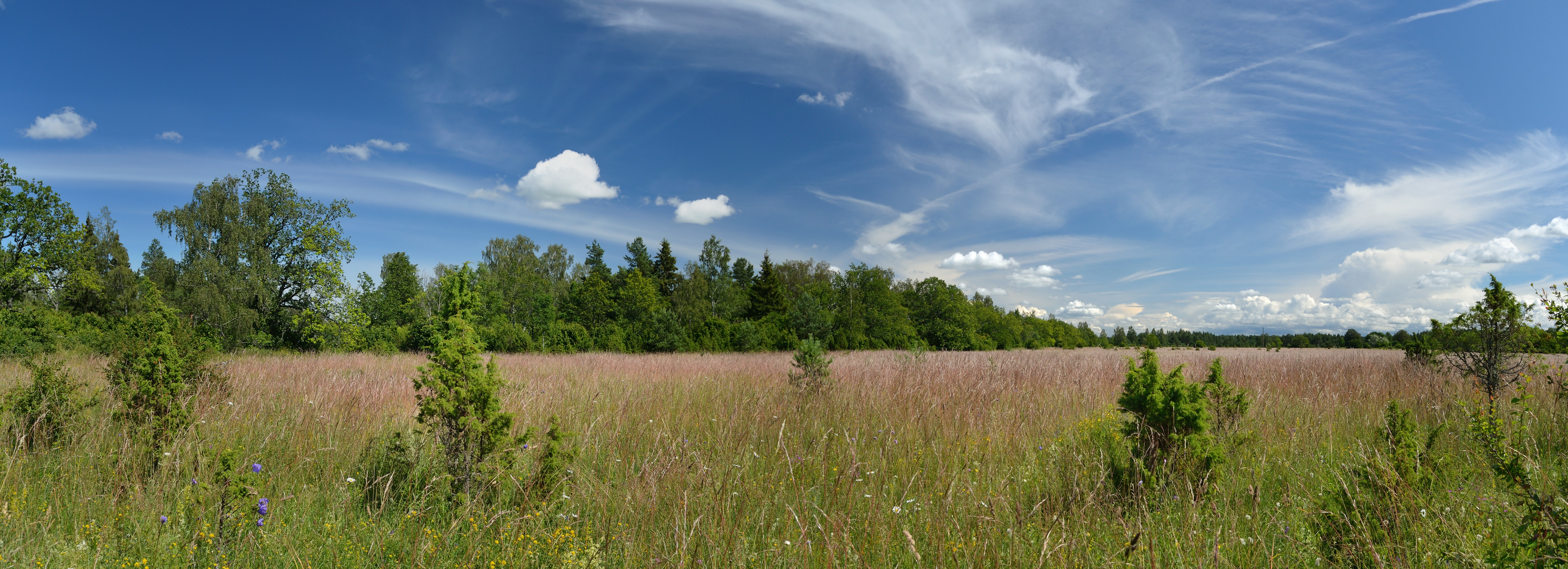
Alvar in Estonia near the town of Keila

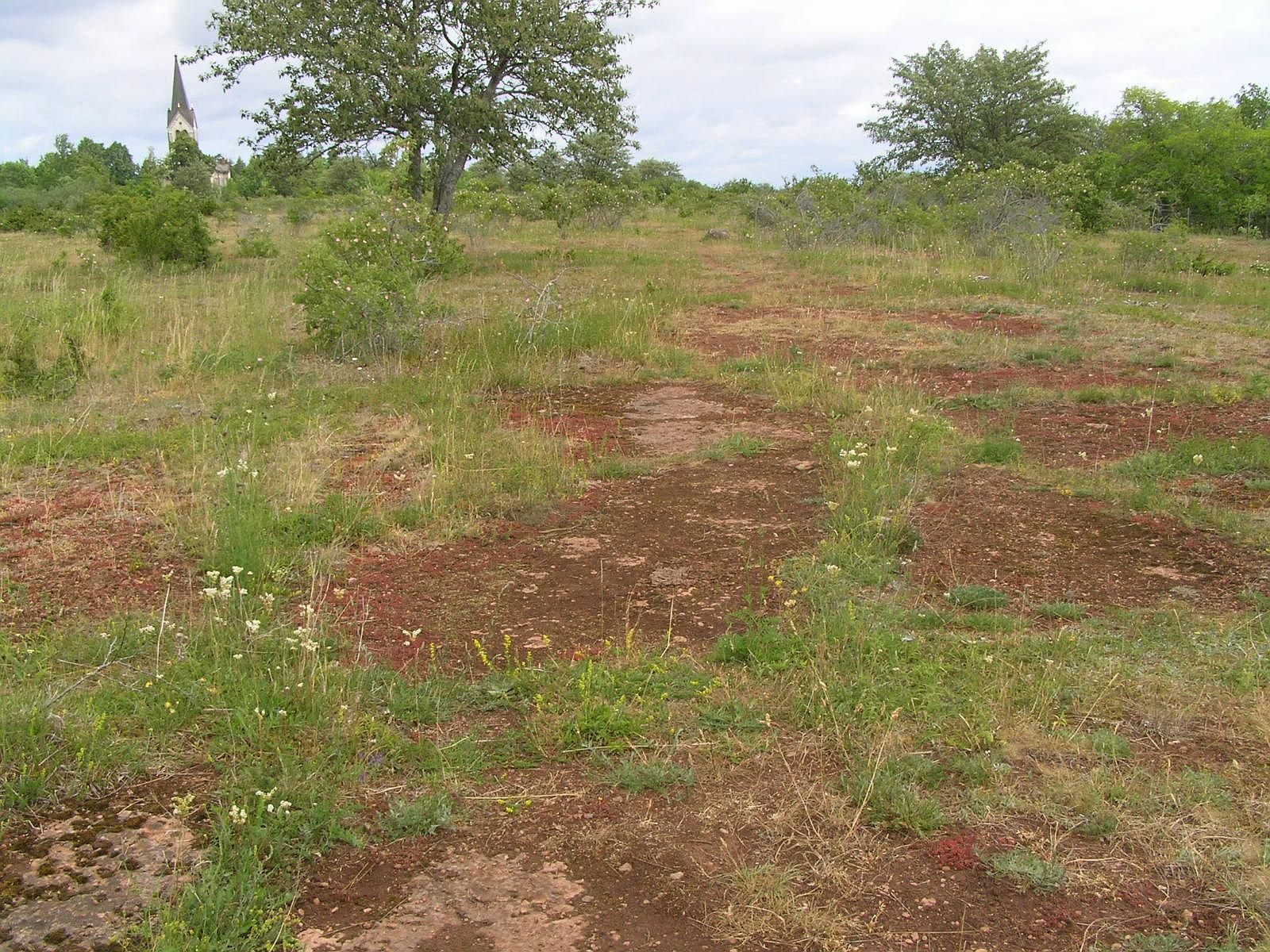
Alvar at Kinnekulle, Sweden. Most plants are confined to the numerous cracks in the limestone.

An alvar is a biological environment based on a limestone plain with thin or no soil and, as a result, sparse grassland vegetation. Often flooded in the spring, and affected by drought in midsummer, alvars support a distinctive group of prairie-like plants. Most alvars occur either in northern Europe or around the Great Lakes in North America. This stressed habitat supports a community of rare plants and animals, including species more commonly found on prairie grasslands. Lichen and mosses are common species. Trees and bushes are absent or severely stunted.

The primary cause of alvars is the shallow exposed bedrock. Flooding and drought, as noted, add to the stress of the site and prevent many species from growing. Disturbance may also play a role. In Europe, grazing is frequent, while in North America, there is some evidence that fire may also prevent encroachment by forest. The habitat also has strong competition gradients, with better competitors occupying the deeper soil and excluding other species to less productive locations. Crevices in the limestone provide a distinctive habitat which is somewhat protected from grazing, and which may provide habitat for unusual ferns such as Pellaea atropurpurea. Bare rock flats provide areas with extremely low competition that serve as refugia for weak competitors such as the sandwort Minuartia michauxii and Micranthes virginiensis. In a representative set of four Ontario alvars, seven habitat types were described. From deep to shallow soil these were: tall grassy meadows, tall forb-rich meadows, low grassy meadows, low forb-rich meadows, dry grassland, rock margin grassland and bare rock flats.

Alvars comprise a small percentage of the Earth's ecosystems by land extent. Although some 120 exist in the North American Great Lakes region, in total there are only about 43 mi^{2} (110 km^{2}) left across the entire Great Lakes basin, and many of these have been degraded by agriculture and other human uses. More than half of all remaining alvars occur in Ontario. There are smaller areas in New York, Michigan, Ohio, Wisconsin and Quebec.

In North America, alvars provide habitat for birds such as bobolinks, eastern meadowlarks, upland sandpipers, eastern towhees, brown thrashers and loggerhead shrikes whose habitat is declining elsewhere. Rare plants include Kalm's lobelia (Lobelia kalmii), Pringle's aster (Symphyotrichum pilosum var. pringlei), juniper sedge (Carex juniperorum), lakeside daisy (Hymenoxys acaulis), ram's-head lady's-slipper (Cypripedium arietinum), and dwarf lake iris (Iris lacustris). Also associated with alvars are rare butterflies and snails. The use of the word "alvar" to refer to this type of environment originated in Sweden. The largest alvar in Europe is located on the Swedish island of Öland. Here the thin soil mantle is only 0.5 to 2.0 centimeters thick in most places and in many extents consists of exposed limestone slabs. The landscape there has been designated a UNESCO World Heritage Site. There are other more local names for similar landforms, such as a pavement barren, although this term is also used for similar landforms based on sandstone. In the United Kingdom the exposed landform is called a limestone pavement and thinly covered limestone is known as calcareous grassland.

== European alvar locations ==
- Sweden
  - Öland – Stora Alvaret – largest alvar extent in Europe
  - Gotland
  - Västergötland – several locations on limestone mountain Kinnekulle, smaller fragments on Falbygden, e.g. in Dala and Högstena parishes
- Estonia
  - Alvars are distributed along the whole northern coast of Estonia from approx. the town of Paldiski to Sillamäe, wherever limestone comes to the surface near the seashore (see Baltic Klint), as well as on the islands of the West Estonian archipelago. Estonia used to be home to approximately one third of the world's alvars; however, the total area of alvars has decreased from 43,000 hectares in the 1930s to 12,000 hectares in 2000, and approximately 9,000 hectares in 2010. Estonian alvars are home to 267 species of vascular plants, approximately one fifth of which are protected. There are also 142 species of bryophytes and 263 species of lichens. The Estonian government has committed itself to protect at least 9,800 hectares of the country's alvars as part of the Natura 2000 network. The Loopealse subdistrict of Tallinn is named after alvar.
  - Vardi Nature Reserve in Rapla County is an Estonian nature reserve especially designated to protect one of the more representative alvar areas of Estonia.
- England
  - Cumbria and North Yorkshire – under protection in the UK Biodiversity Action Plan
- Ireland
  - The Burren, a large alvar in northwest County Clare
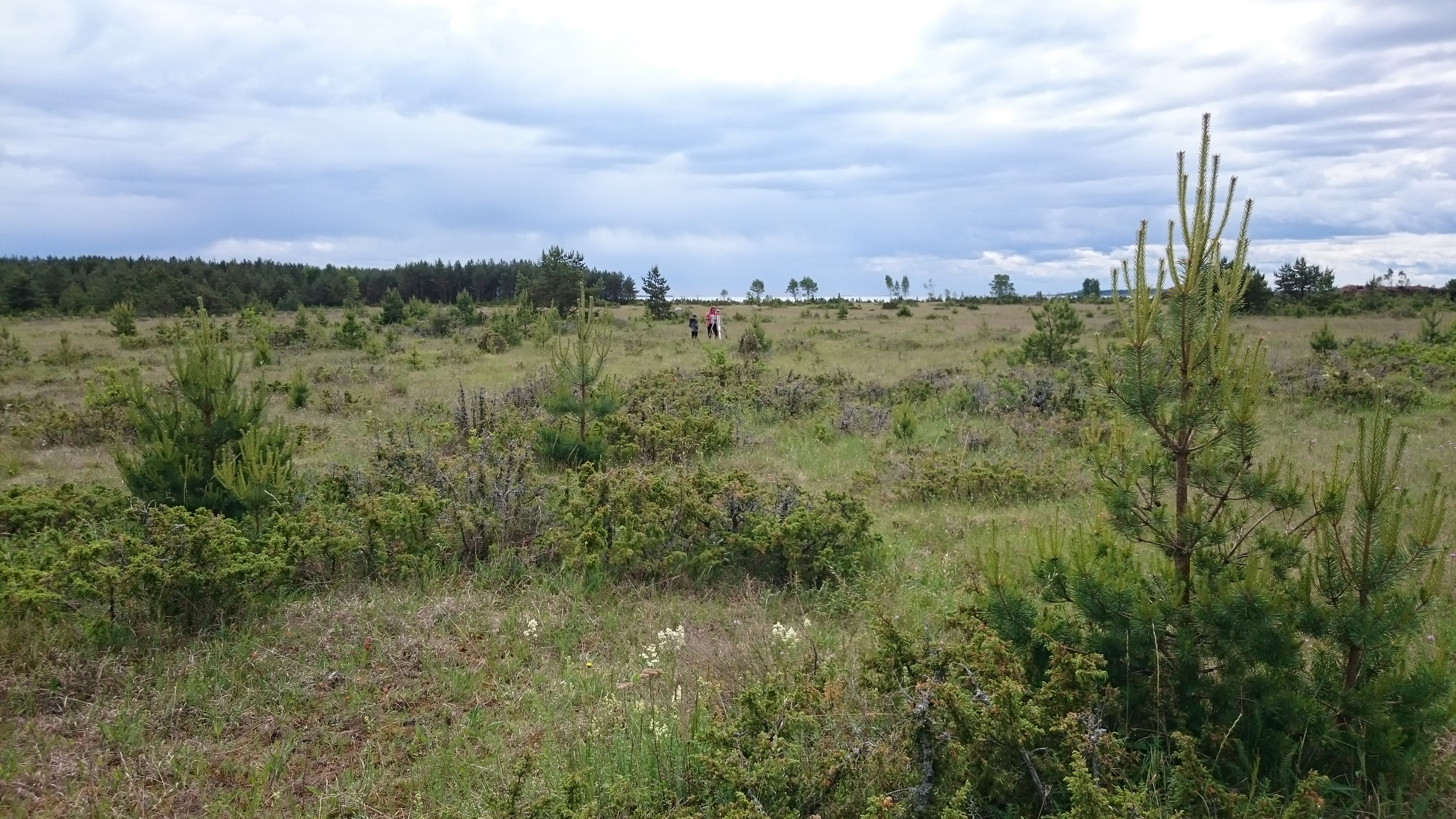
Sarve alvar in Hiiumaa island

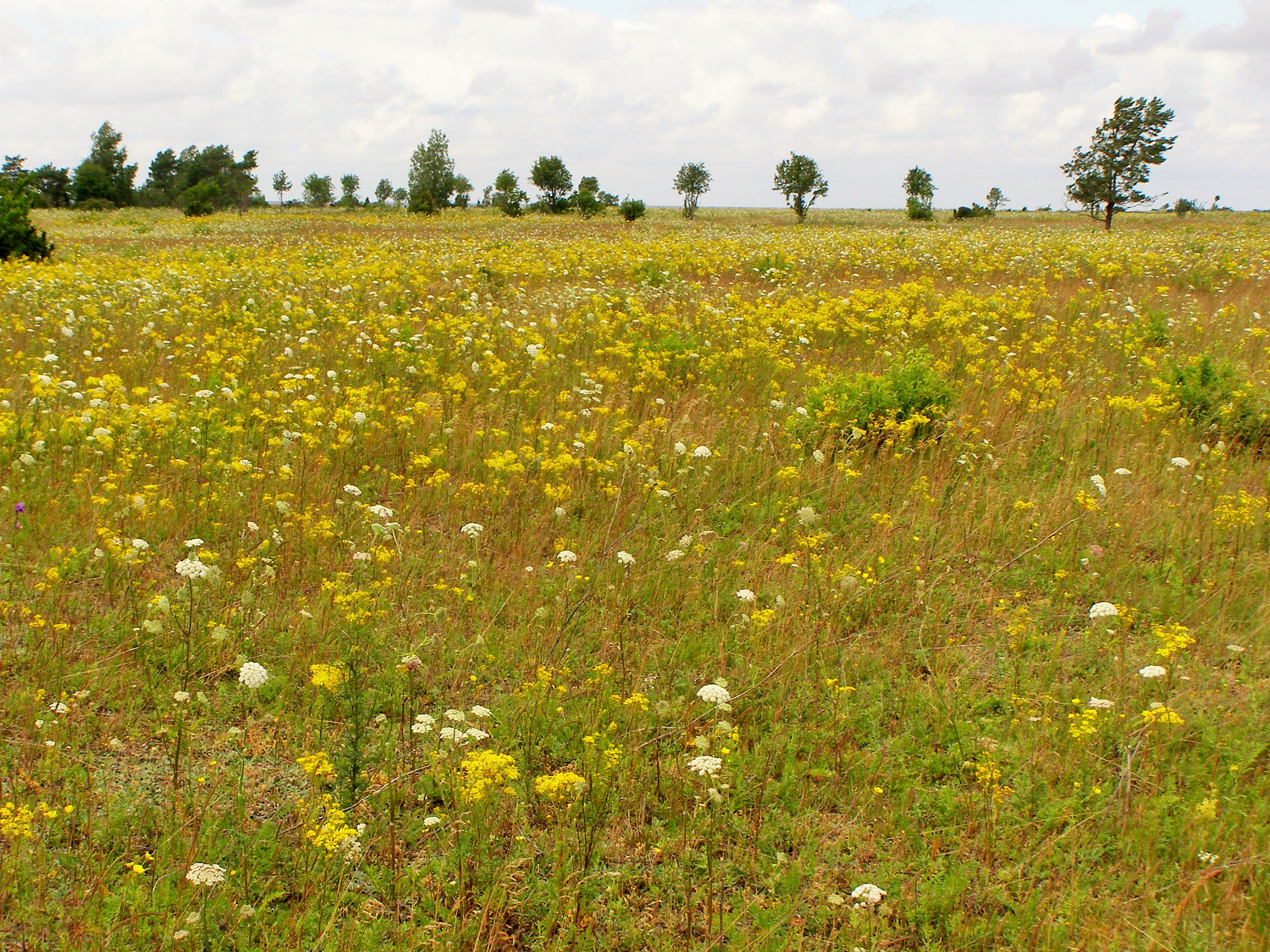
Alvar in Väike-Pakri island

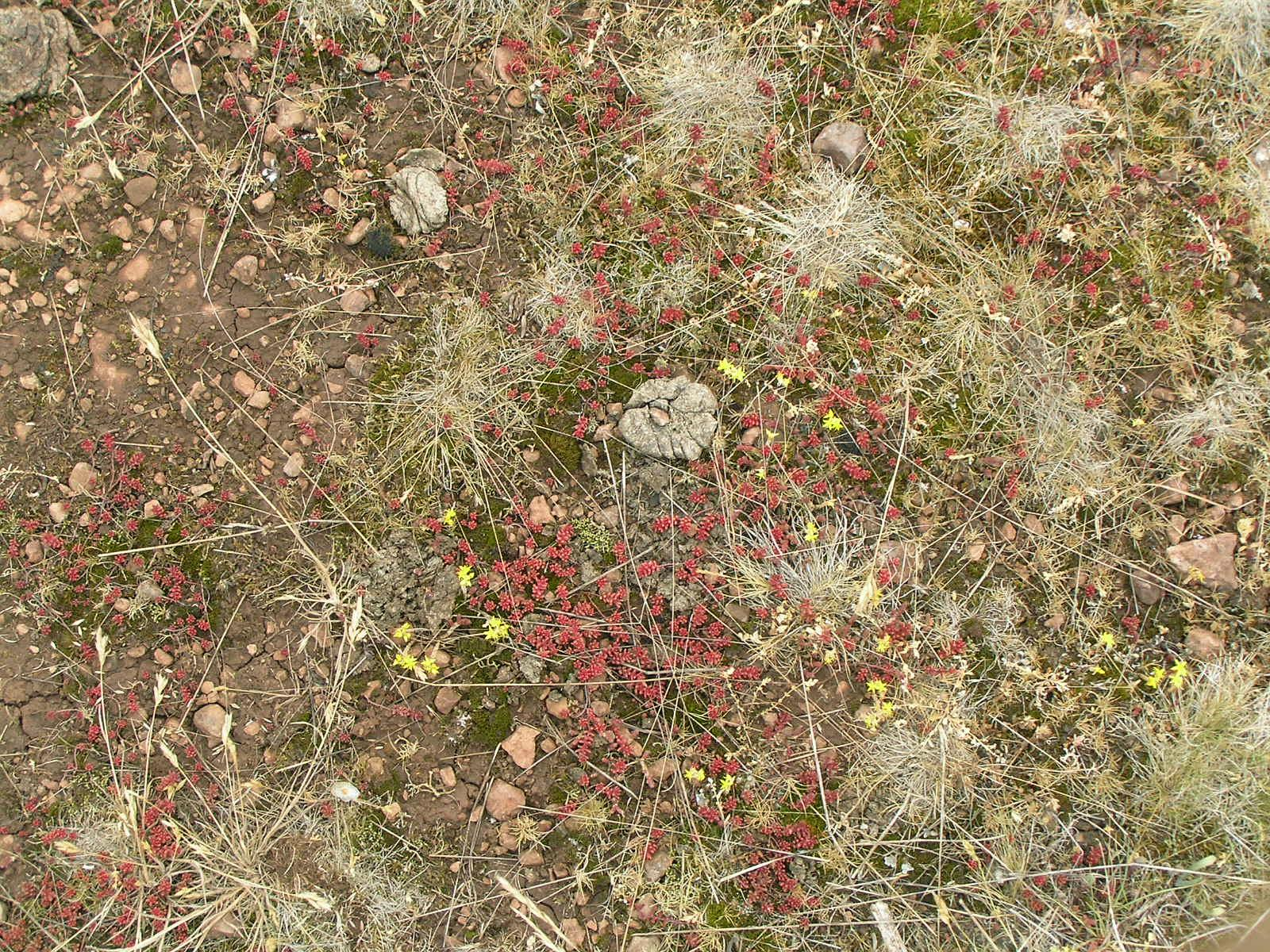
Sparse vegetation, Kinnekulle, Sweden

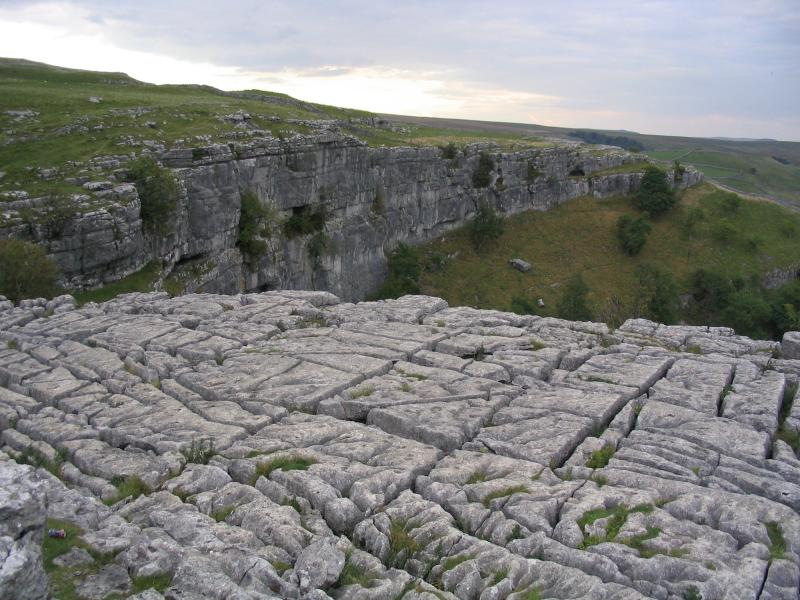
Limestone pavement at Malham Cove, UK

== Some North American alvar locations ==
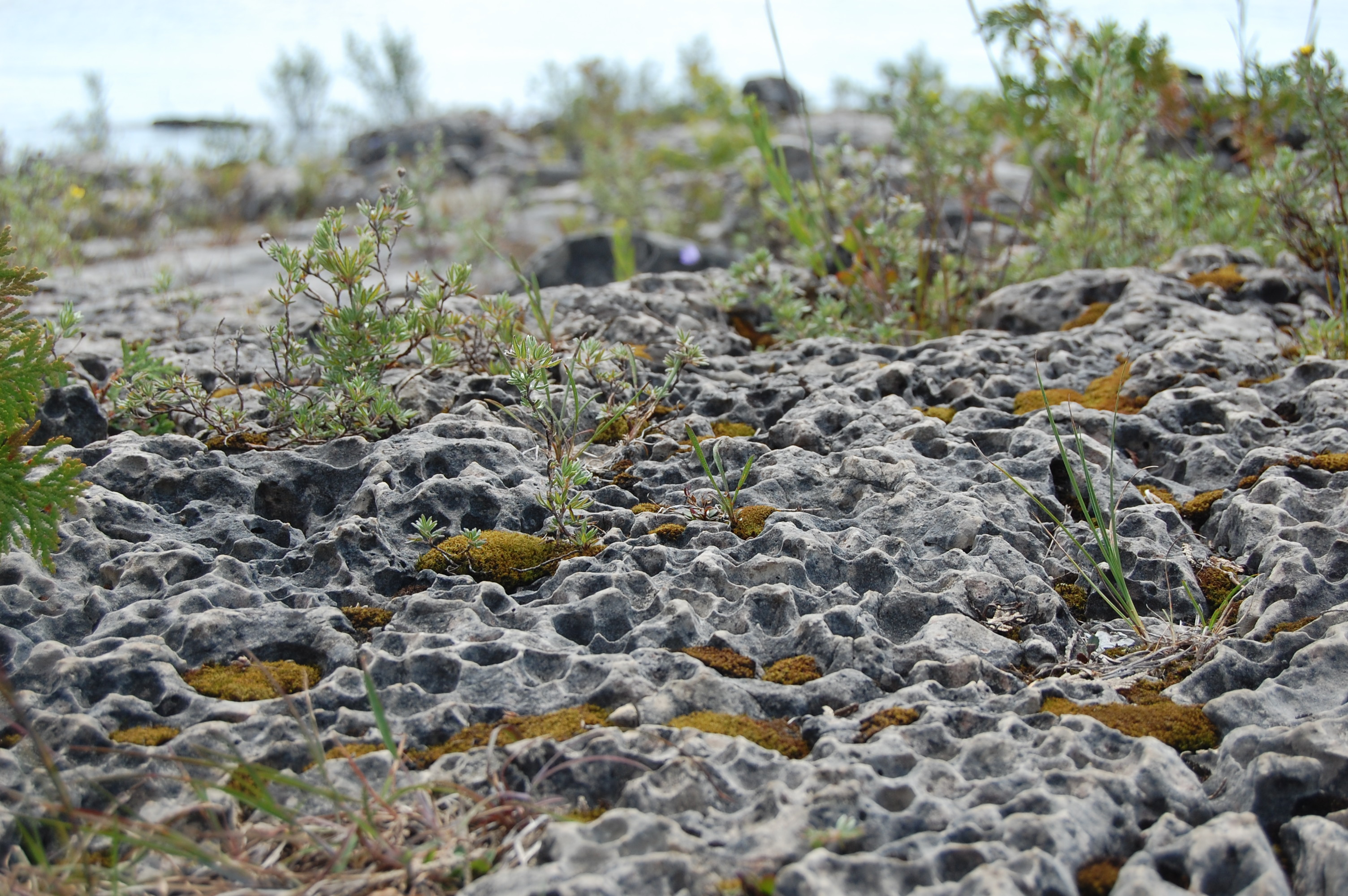
Alvar near the Singing Sands beach of Bruce Peninsula National Park, Canada

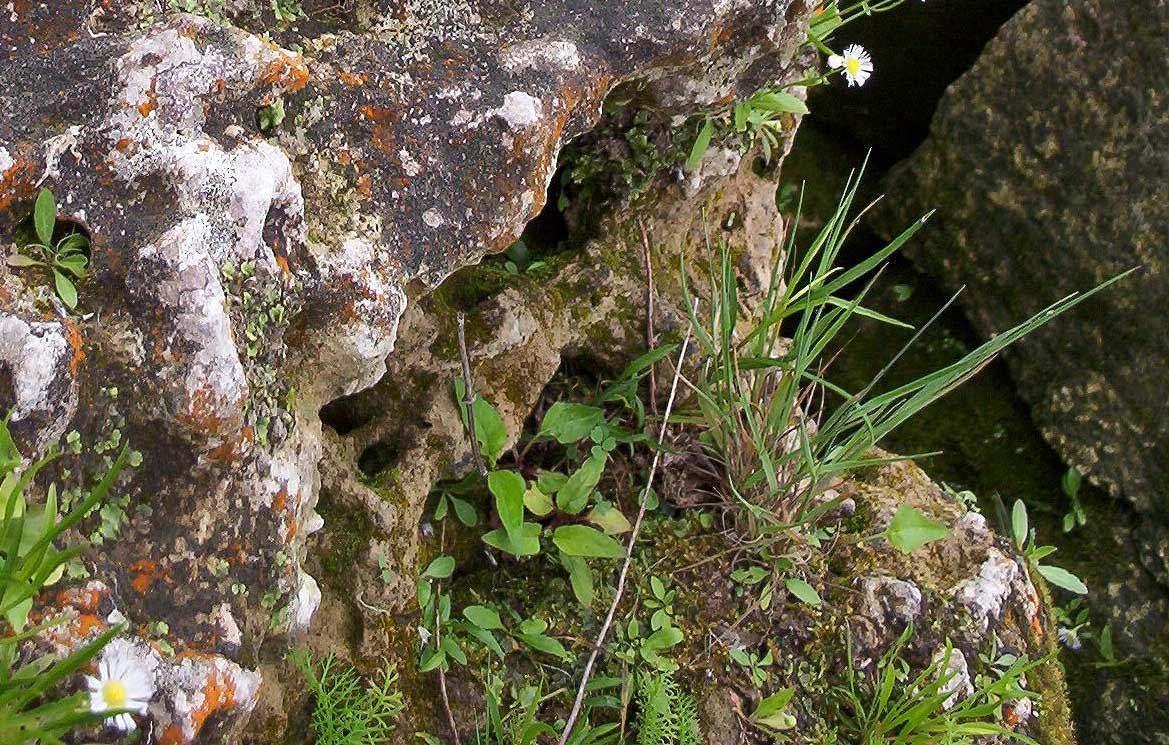
Lichen, moss and grasses on limestone surface. Kelley's Island, Ohio in Lake Erie.

- The rare Charitable Research Reserve – Cambridge, Ontario
- Lake Erie
  - Kelley's Island, Ohio – North Shore Alvar State Nature Preserve
  - Marblehead, Ohio – mostly destroyed by limestone quarrying
  - Pelee Island, Ontario – Stone Road Alvar Nature Reserve
- Lake Huron
  - Maxton Plains Proposed Natural Area, Drummond Island, Michigan
  - Belanger Bay Alvar, Manitoulin Island, Ontario
  - Quarry Bay Nature Reserve, Manitoulin Island, Ontario
  - Bruce Alvar Nature Reserve, Bruce Peninsula, Ontario
  - Baptise Harbour Nature Reserve, Bruce Peninsula, Ontario
  - Misery Bay Provincial Park, Manitoulin Island, Ontario
- Lake Michigan
  - Red Banks Alvar, Red Banks, Brown County, Wisconsin
- Lake Ontario
  - Carden Plain Alvar, City of Kawartha Lakes, Ontario, including Carden Alvar Provincial Park
  - Chaumont Barrens Preserve, New York
  - Three Mile Creek Barrens, New York
  - Burnt Lands Alvar, Almonte, Ontario
  - Balsam Lake Indian Point Provincial Park, Ontario
- Quebec
  - Quyon
  - Alvar d'Aylmer
- Manitoba
  - Interlake

== See also ==
- Calcareous grassland – Ecosystem associated with thin basic soil
- Chalk heath
- Edaphic – Science concerned with the influence of soils on living beings
- Gypcrust – Hardened layer of soil with a high percentage of gypsum
- Gypsum flora of Nova Scotia – Group of plants in Nova Scotia, Canada
- Rendzina – Humus-rich shallow soil type
- Barren vegetation – Area of land where plant growth may be limited
