= Staples River =

River in Kawartha Lakes, Ontario, Canada

- Location of the mouth of the river in Southern Ontario

Location
- Country: Canada
- Province: Ontario
- Region: Central Ontario
- Municipality: Kawartha Lakes

Physical characteristics
- Source: Unnamed confluence
  - location: Eldon Township
  - coordinates: 44°25′38″N 78°57′27″W
  - elevation: 274 m (899 ft)
- Mouth: Balsam Lake
  - location: Fenelon Township
  - coordinates: 44°33′08″N 78°53′30″W
  - elevation: 256 m (840 ft)
- Length: 18 km (11 mi)
- Basin size: 4,792 ha (11,840 acres)

Basin features
- River system: Great Lakes Basin

The Staples River is a river in Kawartha Lakes in Central Ontario, Canada. It is in the Great Lakes Basin and is a tributary of Balsam Lake. The river is 18 kilometres (11 mi) long and has a watershed of 4,792 hectares (11,840 acres).

The river begins at an unnamed confluence of streams, northwest of the community of Grasshill in geographic Eldon Township, and flows northeast to its mouth at the West Bay on Balsam Lake in geographic Fenelon Township, at the summit of the Trent–Severn Waterway.
