= Balsam Lake Provincial Park =

Provincial park in Ontario, Canada

- IUCN category II (national park)
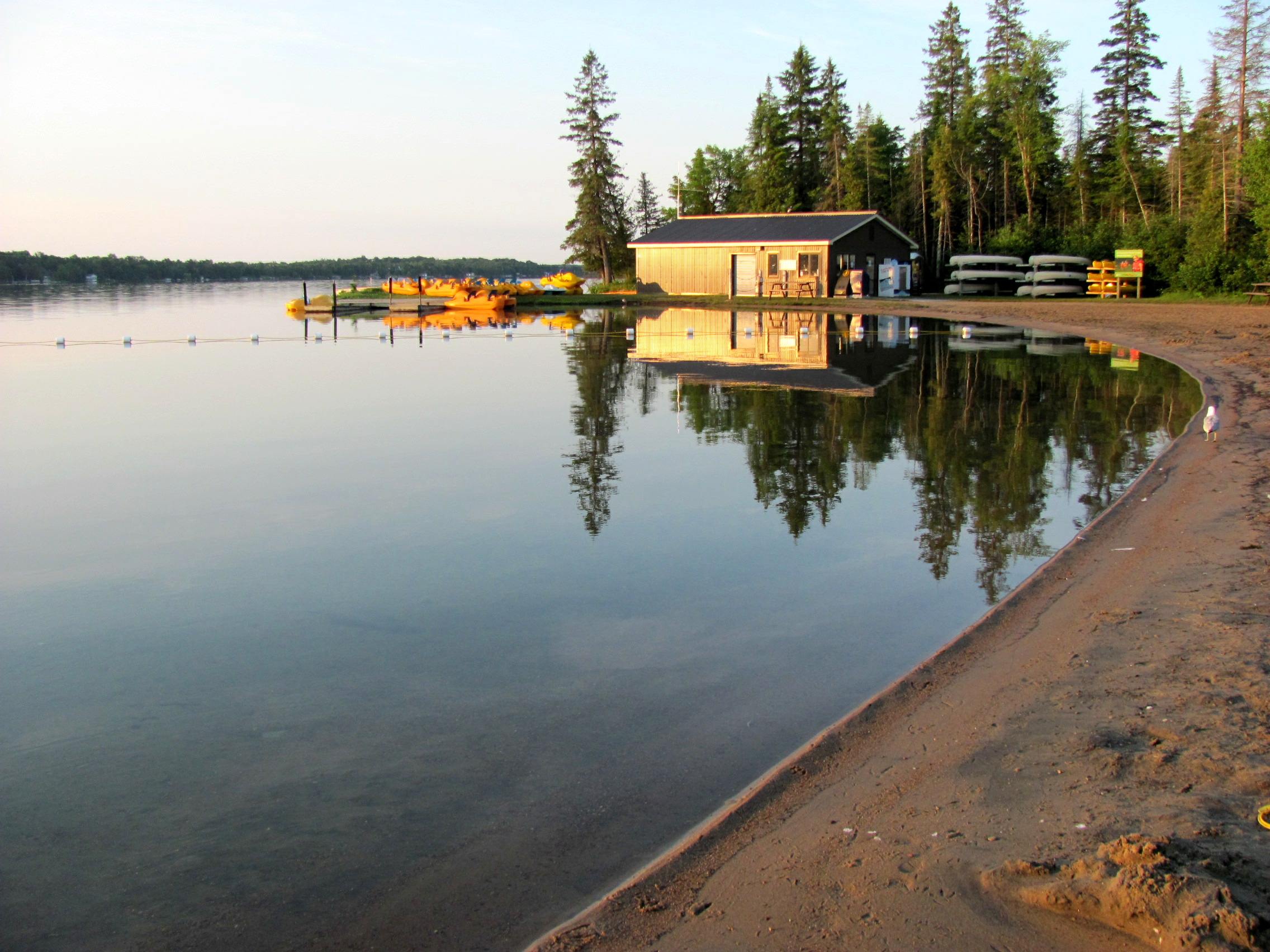
- Sunrise at Balsam Lake Provincial Park Beach

- Location within Southern Ontario
- Interactive map of Balsam Lake Provincial Park
- Location: Kawartha Lakes, Ontario, Canada
- Nearest city: Coboconk
- Coordinates: 44.62555°N 78.85738°W
- Area: 946 ha (2,340 acres)
- Established: 1968
- Visitors: 193,167 (in 2022)
- Governing body: Ontario Parks
- Website: www.ontarioparks.com/park/balsamlake

Balsam Lake Provincial Park is a provincial park located in south-central Ontario, Canada, on Balsam Lake. The park is situated along the Trent-Severn Waterway, a few kilometres southwest of Coboconk. It is an all-seasons recreation area offering camping, boating and fishing, and while closed in winter it is also used for skiing and snowshoeing.

== Environment ==
Balsam Lake is part of a waterway that extends 389 kilometres across Ontario. The waterway, entitled Trent-Severn Waterway, allows lakes and rivers throughout Ontario to be connected through canals. These canals allow individuals to travel by boat from one lake to another. For example, one can travel from Georgian Bay to Lake Ontario in addition to other regions. In the vicinity of the park are the Haliburton Highlands, the Muskoka Lakes, and the Precambrian wilderness. The wildlife consists of animals such as deer, fox, raccoons, skunks, squirrels, chipmunks, beavers, coyotes, a wide variety of birds and definitely North American black bears.

== Facilities and Services ==
Camping: Balsam Lake Provincial Park has 506 campsites distributed throughout the region. Of these campsites, 206 have electricity. The park also contains 3 group camping sites accompanied by vault privies and drinking water. These sites must be reserved in advance through an application form and are only offered to non-profit youth groups. Alcohol and trailers are prohibited, while tents are permitted in any of the camping sites. Some of the other services in the campsites include: showers, toilets, Laundromats as well as a playgrounds for children.

Shopping: The Park Store (formerly known as the Gift Shop) is located at the entrance of the park and carries park souvenirs. Firewood is made available at the Park Store and can also be found at the main office. In addition, there is a snack bar located on the beach. More stores are accessible in the local town of Coboconk.

Rentals: Balsam Lake Provincial Park offers kayaks, canoes, and paddle boats for rent. These rentals can be obtained from the Water Craft Rental Centre on the south side of the beach. Campers can rent equipment in 2 hour increments or overnight.

== Activities ==
Hiking: There are two trails that are situated in the Balsam Lake Provincial Park. They are the Lookout trail which is 2.6 km and the Plantation trail which is 4.2 km. The Lookout trail begins on an esker and goes through different landscapes such as a cedar swamp, a deciduous forest, and a meadow. The Plantation trail identifies the impact man has made on the land over the past 150 years. The trail travels through logging sites, farm fields, as well as reforestation plantations.

Park Activities: Balsam Lake Provincial Park has a beach close to most campsites where campers can perform water-based activities during spring and summer. Several fish including Bass, walleye, muskie, and panfish are found in the lake for when campers go fishing. Other beach activities include canoeing, boating, and swimming. Aside from water-based activities, cycling is also an option as there are paved roads distributed amongst the park. In the autumn season, visitors tend to observe the trees as the leaves are changing colours. During the winter campers come to snowboard, ski, or hike.
