= Carden Alvar Provincial Park =

Provincial park in Ontario, Canada

- IUCN category V (protected landscape/seascape)
- Location within Southern Ontario
- Interactive map of Carden Alvar Provincial Park
- Location: City of Kawartha Lakes, Ontario
- Nearest city: Orillia, Ontario, Canada
- Coordinates: 44°37′51″N 79°03′17″W
- Area: 1,917 ha (19.17 km^{2})
- Established: 2014
- Governing body: Ontario Parks

Carden Alvar Provincial Park is a provincial park located in the Kawartha Lakes in Central Ontario, Canada. Alvars are globally rare ecosystems found exclusively in Northern Europe and the Great Lakes region of North America. The park is classified as a non-operating, natural environment park and was established in 2014. Natural environment parks protect outstanding landscapes, ecosystems and other elements of the province's wilderness to provide high quality recreational and educational experiences for visitors.

== History ==
The park was created in 2014 from two properties: the 1,214 hectares (3,000 acres) Cameron Ranch and the 647 hectares (1,600 acres) Windmill Ranch. They are irregularly shaped but adjoining properties that are southeast of the town of Dalrymple and west of Wylie Rd. Both properties were acquired with assistance of The Couchiching Conservancy and the Nature Conservancy of Canada, with the Couchiching Conservancy acting as steward of the properties since their acquisition. Windmill Ranch was a family farm last operated by John Arthur Hawtin and Noreen Hawtin.

== Visitor activities ==
As a natural environment park, Carden Alvar Provincial Park contains no campgrounds, restrooms or recreational facilities. Two common uses for the park area are birdwatching and hiking. Access to the eastern portion of the park (the Windmill Ranch property) is limited to guided tours arranged through the Couchiching Conservancy. However, given the approximately 4 kilometres (2.5 mi) frontage along Wylie Rd, many birders observe from the road. Wylie Rd. is also an important observation area for the region's butterflies.

=== Birdwatching and status within an Important Bird Area ===
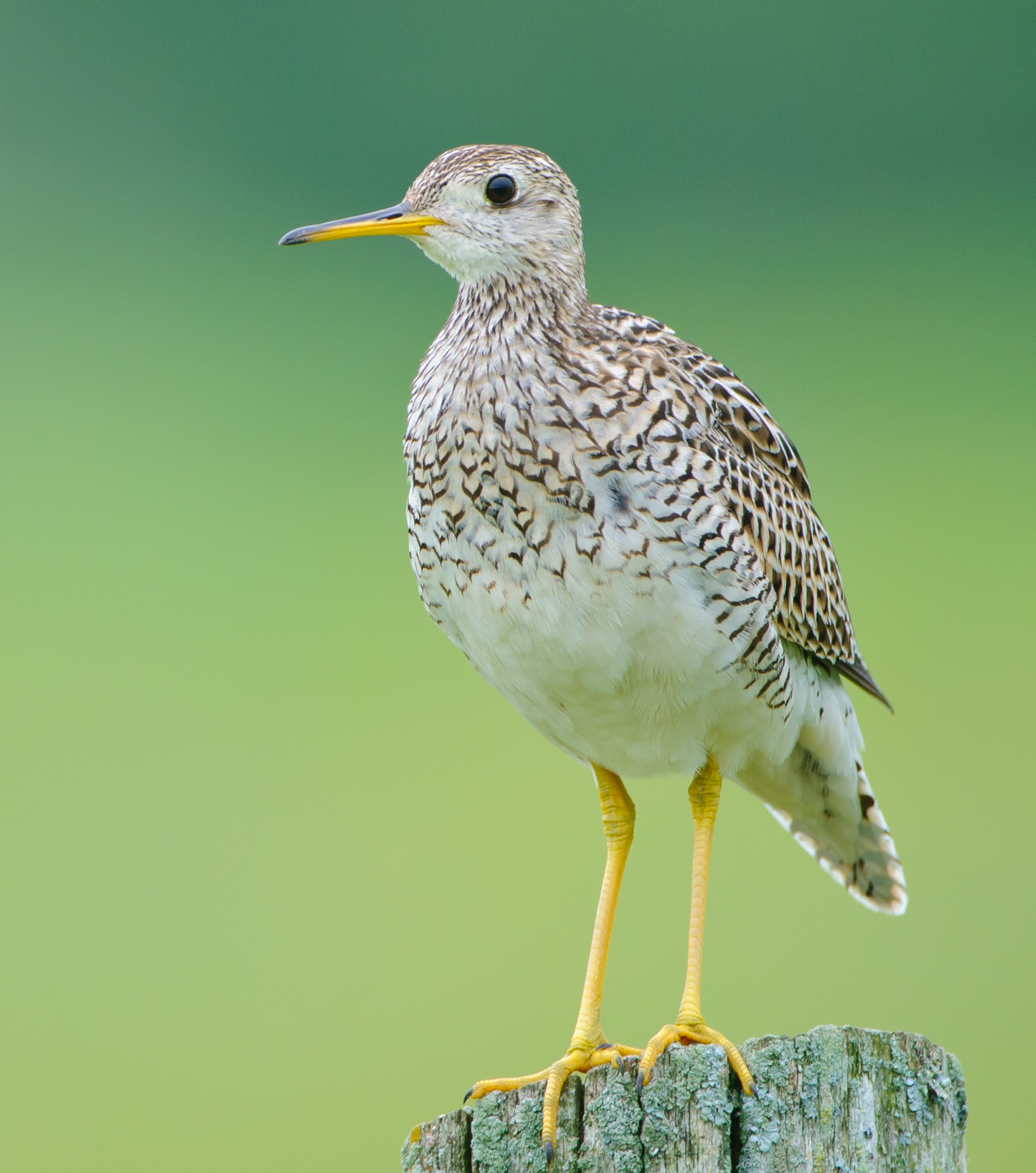
Upland Sandpiper on a fence post in the Carden Alvar

The park lies at the heart of the Carden Alvar Important Bird Area (IBA) and contains breeding habitat for the eastern subspecies of the Loggerhead Shrike, a species listed as endangered both provincially and federally. The Loggerhead Shrike has only three breeding sites in Ontario, and approximately half of the breeding pairs in the province are often found in the Carden Alvar. Over 230 bird species have been recorded in the area, including Bobolink, Short-eared Owl, Least Bittern, Red-headed Woodpecker, Yellow Rail, Eastern Meadowlark, and Grasshopper Sparrow. The broader Carden Plain received the IBA designation in 1998 from Bird Studies Canada and the Canadian Nature Federation.

== See also ==
- Burnt Lands alvar - including Burnt Lands Alvar Provincial Park
