= Port Bolster, Ontario =

Unincorporated community in Ontario, Canada

Coordinates: 44.346124°N 79.203278°W

Port Bolster is an unincorporated community in Ontario, Canada. It is recognized as a designated place by Statistics Canada.

== Demographics ==
In the 2021 Census of Population conducted by Statistics Canada, Port Bolster had a population of 192 living in 72 of its 81 total private dwellings, a change of 42.2% from its 2016 population of 135. With a land area of 0.46 km^{2} (0.18 sq mi), it had a population density of 417.4/km^{2} (1,081.0/sq mi) in 2021.

== See also ==
- List of communities in Ontario
- List of designated places in Ontario
