= Woodville, Ontario =

Woodville
- Village
- Location within City of Kawartha Lakes Location within Southern Ontario
- Coordinates: 44°23′08″N 78°59′13″W
- Country: Canada
- Province: Ontario
- Municipality: Kawartha Lakes
- Established: 1878

Population (2021)
  - Total: 718
- Postal code: K0M
- Area code: 705

Woodville is a community in Kawartha Lakes, Ontario, Canada. It is located west of Lindsay. The population is 718 (2021).

== History ==
Known in the late 19th century as Irish Corners, the name of the town was changed to Woodville after the completion of the post office under postmaster John Morrison. In 1871 the Toronto and Nipissing Railway was built through the flourishing settlement and in 1878 Woodville became a police village, and incorporated in 1884.

Woodville had a town hall, lock-up, grist-mill, two foundries, a cheese factory, planing mill and sash and door factory, a number of dry goods stores, mechanics' shops, and three hotels. It also had its own brick school house, with two teachers, and two churches – one Presbyterian, the other Methodist. Today, the cheese factory, rail station, gristmill, mechanics shops, and hotels have all been shut down.

Woodville now has two restaurants, one variety store, a post office, fire station, pharmacy, cannabis dispensary, curling rink, hockey arena, two baseball diamonds and a newer Elementary School, that was first built in 1923.

== Geography ==
A two and one-half kilometres (one and a half miles) to the east of Woodville is an auction barn which was opened in 1961 by Norman MacIntyre and his family.

The local post office on King St. serves locals with lock boxes.

== Demographics ==
In the 2021 Census of Population conducted by Statistics Canada, Woodville had a population of 718 living in 275 of its 295 total private dwellings, a change of −13.1% from its 2016 population of 826. With a land area of 2.28 km^{2} (0.88 sq mi), it had a population density of 314.9/km^{2} (815.6/sq mi) in 2021.

== Notable people ==
- Malcolm Bruce Jackson, politician
- Billy McGimsie, hockey hall of famer who played for the Stanley Cup-winning Kenora Thistles
- Adam Rogers, CFL player
- Tom Thornbury, NHL player
- James Barker, country musician

== See also ==
- List of unincorporated communities in Ontario
