= Balsam Lake (Ontario) =

Lake in southern Ontario, Canada

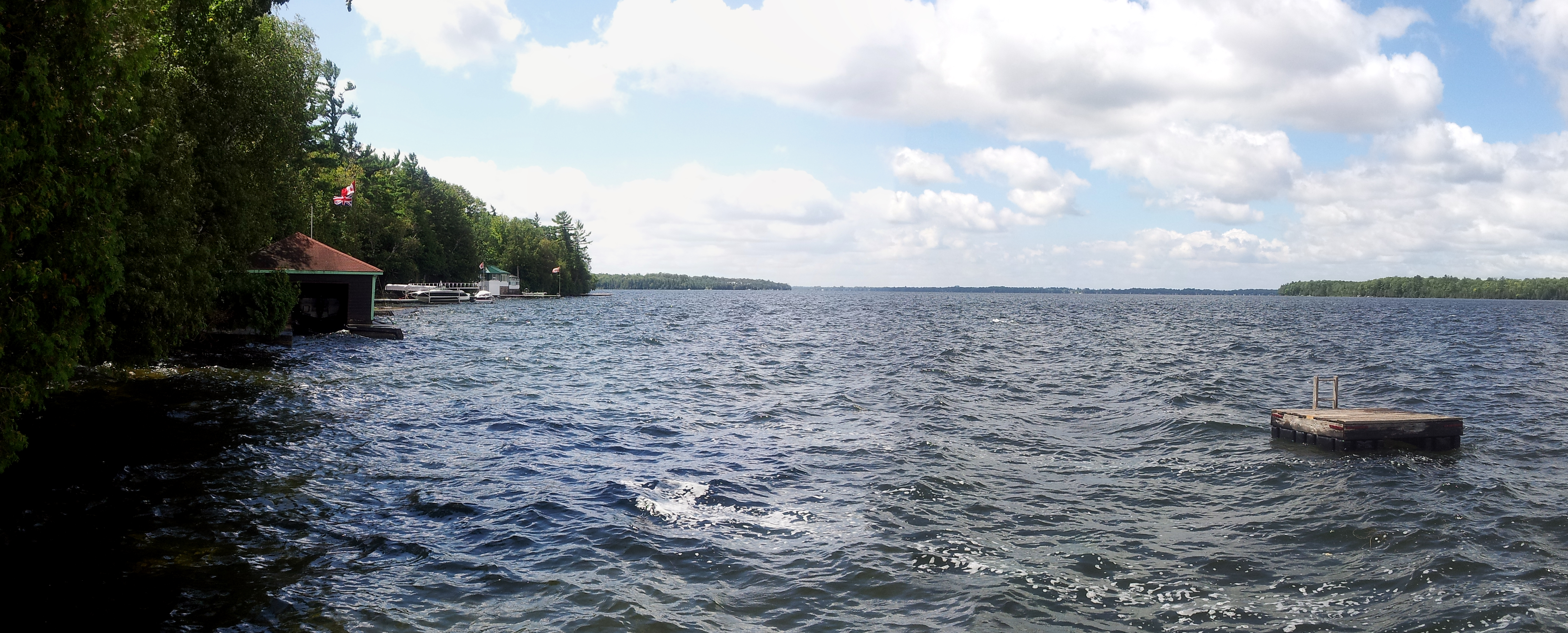

- Location in Southern Ontario
- Location: Kawartha Lakes, Ontario
- Group: Kawartha Lakes
- Coordinates: 44°34′50″N 78°50′30″W
- Primary inflows: Gull River, Staples River, Corben Creek
- Primary outflows: Rosedale River, Trent Canal
- Catchment area: 115 km^{2} (44 sq mi)
- Basin countries: Canada
- Max. length: 16 km (9.9 mi)
- Max. width: 3 km (1.9 mi)
- Surface area: 48 km^{2} (19 sq mi)
- Max. depth: 15.24 m (50.0 ft)
- Surface elevation: 256.3 metres (841 ft)
- Islands: Grand Island, Hogg Island, Ball Island, Delamere Island, Ant Island, Cherry Island
- Settlements: Coboconk

Balsam Lake is a lake in the City of Kawartha Lakes in Central Ontario, Canada. It is in the Great Lakes Basin, is one of the lakes of the Kawartha Lakes, and is at the summit of the Trent–Severn Waterway.

== Balsam Lake tragedy ==
On July 20, 1926, a 30-foot canoe carrying 13 youth and two adult leaders from a Brotherhood of St. Andrew Anglican leadership camp capsized in a sudden storm. Only four survived, three youth and one adult. The incident is dramatized in the 2019 film Brotherhood.

== Geography ==
Balsam Lake is 16 kilometres (9.9 mi) long and averages 3 kilometres (1.9 mi) wide, though its actual width varies due to the many large bays that carve its shoreline; the total area is 48 square kilometres (19 sq mi) and the watershed area is 115 square kilometres (44 sq mi). The primary inflows are the Gull River at the north and the Staples River at the southwest.

The lake is the highest point of the Trent–Severn Waterway at 256.3 metres (841 ft); from here, the waterway descends to Georgian Bay in the northwest, and to Lake Ontario in the southeast. It is the highest point to which a vessel can be navigated from sea level in the Great Lakes-Saint Lawrence River drainage basin.

The main outflow, at the east, is the Rosedale River and Trent Canal leading to Cameron Lake.

The village of Coboconk is located on the north side of the lake.

== Natural history ==
Balsam Lake Provincial Park and Indian Point Provincial Park are located on the north shore of the lake.

The lake offers excellent fishing for bass, walleye, and muskie. Mackenzie Bay in West Bay is a popular spot for boats to congregate on a warm summer day.

== Map images ==
Map of Balsam Lake

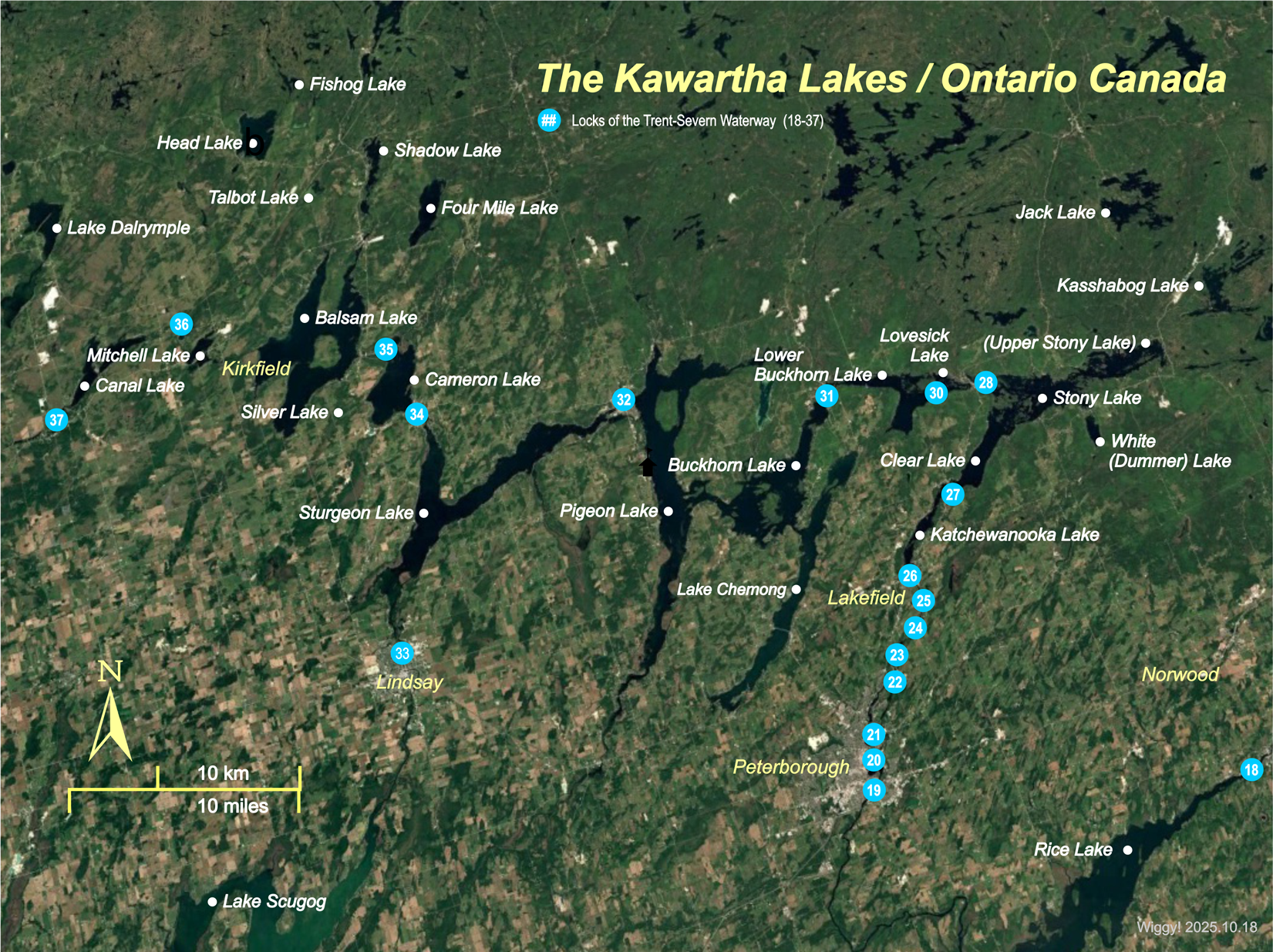
The Kawartha Lakes and the Trent Severn Waterway; Balsam Lake in the upper left quadrant

== See also ==
- List of lakes in Ontario
