= The New Gallery =

Non-commercial artist-run centre

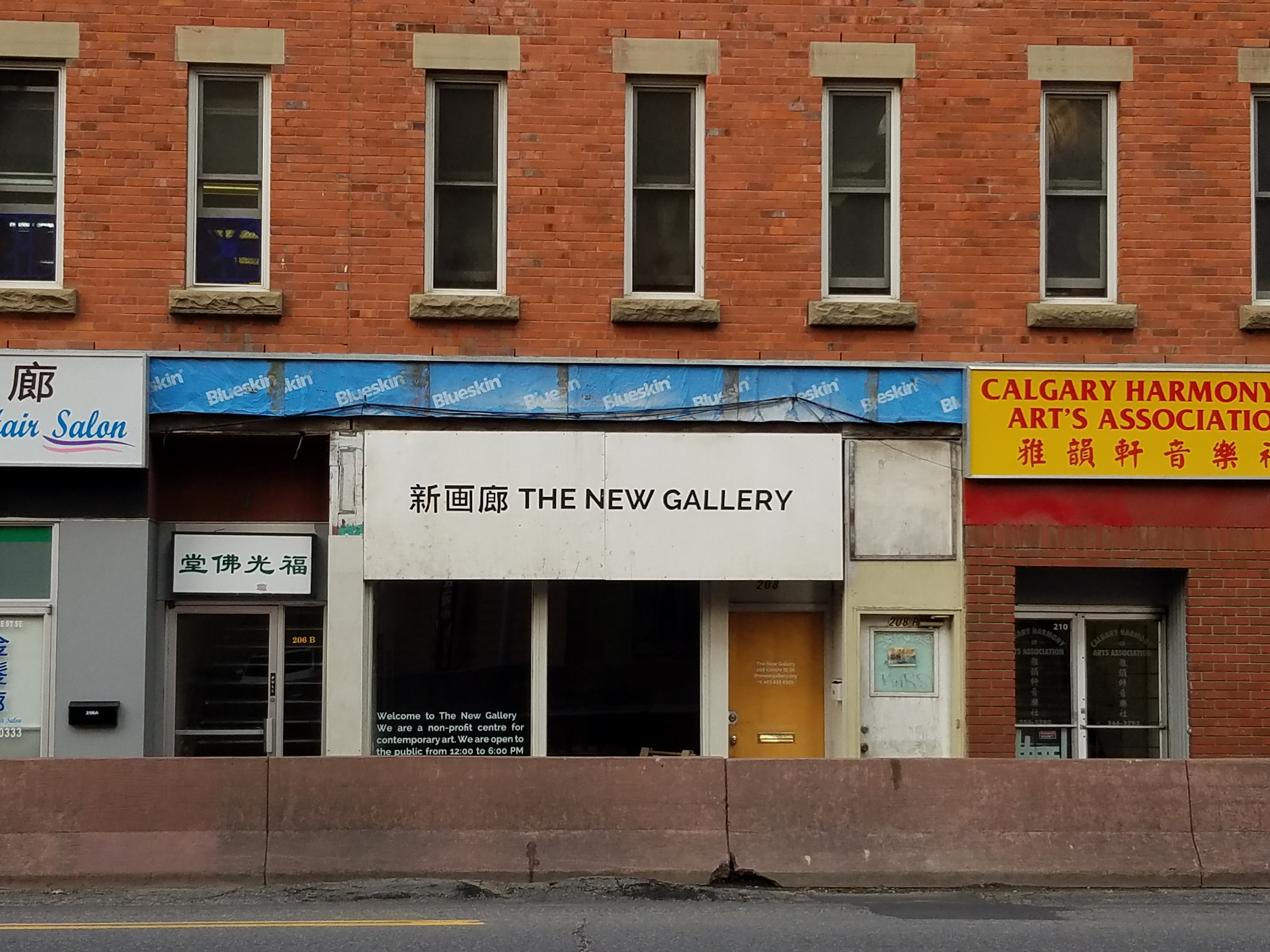
- Entrance of The New Gallery in Calgary
- Abbreviation: TNG
- Formation: 1974
- Type: Non-profit artist-run centre
- Purpose: Exhibition and promotion of contemporary art
- Location: Calgary, Alberta, Canada
- Coordinates: 51.05101°N 114.062767°W
- Website: www.thenewgallery.org
- Formerly called: Clouds 'n' Water Gallery; Off Centre Centre

The New Gallery (TNG) is a non-commercial artist-run centre that presents and promotes contemporary art in Calgary, Alberta, Canada.

TNG is a not-for-profit arts organization and does not sell art. Instead, it provides a venue for artists producing new work that may be experimental in nature or not commercially viable. As with many other artist-run centres, programming is selected by a peer jury process. TNG is funded by the federal, provincial, and municipal governments, by grants from private organizations, and by donations from the public. Artists who exhibit with TNG are paid CARFAC fees.

In addition to providing early exhibition opportunities for artists, TNG provided the impetus for the creation of a variety of other local cultural organizations, including EMMEDIA and the Mountain: Standard Time Performance Art Festival. TNG is also known for fostering the production and trade of Artist Trading Cards.

TNG has been known by two different names in the past: the Clouds 'n' Water Gallery and Visual Production Society and Off Centre Centre.

== History and locations ==
=== Clouds 'n' Water Gallery, 1974 to 1980 ===
TNG was founded in 1974 as the Clouds 'n' Water Gallery. The initiating members, photographers Glen Oxenbury and Michael Feinburg, wanted to create an exhibition space for "alternative art forms, principally photography." The Gallery, which also included the Sancious coffee house, officially opened at 516a 9th Avenue SW, Calgary, on March 15, 1975. Although Sancious was intended to provide financial support to the new institution, the Canada Council and the Calgary Regional Arts Foundation (now Calgary Arts Development) also provided funds.

The gallery was formally incorporated as the Clouds 'n' Water Gallery and Visual Production Society on April 12, 1976. The Gallery encountered financial difficulties that year, and expanded Sancious to include a restaurant component. The expansion resulted in a de-emphasis on visual art and artists, and led to the suspension of the Gallery's Canada Council funding.

In 1978, the role of the coffee house and restaurant were minimized. Emphasis was instead placed on non-commercial performances, including experimental dance, music and poetry. By the end of that year, the kitchen was removed from the Gallery and the space was turned into an additional area for exhibitions. The renewed focus on art resulted in the reinstatement of Canada Council Funding.

=== Off Centre Centre, 1980 to 1987 ===
In 1979, the arrival of a bar/restaurant next to the Gallery forced the Society to relocate. The relocation process resulted in a reconsideration of the Gallery's mandate, role in the community, and name. In 1980, the Clouds 'n' Water Gallery became Off Centre Centre (OCC), located just off Centre Street in the Neilson Building on Calgary's Stephen Avenue. The new space on the third floor of the historic Neilson Building opened on May 6, 1980, and included a studio for a non-profit radio station called Radio Cora-Radio/Radio, which began its association with the Gallery in 1979. The space also included an area for video work, which was eventually administered by Centre Art Video (CAV), a branch of OCC that ultimately became an independent institution known as EMMEDIA.

The 1980s were characterized by the Gallery's focus on community collaborations. In addition to its association with Radio/Radio and CAV, OCC worked with organizations such as ANNPAC (Association of National Non-Profit Artist Centres) and One Yellow Rabbit (theatre company) to advance artist's rights and artistic practices in Calgary and Canada. Programming choices were diverse, with multidisciplinary exhibitions and performances. The original mandate to provide a space for the exhibition of photographs was expanded to include the exhibition of a wide variety of works.

On April 21, 1987, fire swept through the Neilson Building, causing damage to OCC's space and to the exhibition displayed there at the time, Frank's Wild Years by artist Bart Habermiller. The fire precipitated another move for the Gallery, this time to 722 11th Avenue SW, Calgary. As before, the Gallery changed its name along with its location, and became The New Gallery.

=== The New Gallery, 1987 to present ===
From the late 1980s to the mid-1990s, one of TNG's main contributions to the community was its significant support for performance art. Long-time TNG employee Sandra Vida (formerly Tivy) organized Media Blitz (1988), Media Blitz 2 (1989) and PULSE: an Intermedia Festival. Stemming from Calgary's burgeoning performance art culture, these performance festivals included the involvement of the Calgary Society of Independent Filmmakers (CSIF), EMMEDIA and the Truck Gallery. TNG's involvement with performative art continued into 2000, with events such as Space for Space, a series of informal performances hosted by TNG and Ex. 120, 120 hours of performance art completed over a period of five days. The demand for performative events was eventually led to the creation of the Mountain Standard Time Performative Arts Festival (M:ST) in 2001. In 2003, M:ST transitioned into its own non-profit society.

In addition to its involvement with performative arts, in the 1990s TNG dedicated itself to creating a diverse arts community. At a 1992 conference of ANNPAC, the issue of diversity in the arts was brought to the fore by Minquon Panchayat, a coalition of First Nations and visible minority writers and artists. The coalition felt excluded by the contemporary definition of community, and sought to draw attention to the issue while also becoming a part of the community. The issues of gender and race representation had a significant impact on the Gallery, with the Board of Directors deciding to give members of the Calgary chapter of Minquon Panchayat control over the 1992-93 exhibitions. According to author Tomas Jonsson, the resulting programming "actively critiqu[ed] perceived disparities in both Canadian society and artist-run culture."

In 1996, the Gallery once again changed locations, although this time kept its name. TNG moved to 516d 9th Avenue SW, the same building as the original location of the Clouds 'n' Water Gallery.

In 1997, TNG initiated one of its longest running programming initiatives, Artist Trading Cards (ATCs). Developed in their modern form by m. vänçi stirnneman in 1997, the concept of ATCs was brought to Calgary later that year by artist and former TNG employee Don Mabie. ATCs, small cards created in any media that are traded by producers, are often seen as a democratic, non-commercial way to participate in art. Jonsson notes that through the act of trading, "…ATCs provide a subversively simple way for artists to exchange ideas/art and transcend the commercial and physical boundaries of artistic practice." Just as the Clouds 'n' Water Gallery emerged as an "alternative" exhibition space, ATCs provide an alternative form of exchanging art. Currently, ATC trading sessions are held on the last Saturday of every month at The New Gallery.

In 2006, TNG was informed that its current location on 9th Avenue, in the complex known locally as Penny Lane, was slated for demolition. TNG hastily relocated to Eau Claire Market, a shopping mall located in downtown Calgary. The location was considered a mixed blessing: while TNG's position in a mall potentially exposed it to a new audience, a non-commercial gallery seemed out of place in a commercial centre. TNG was also subject to mall regulations, and in one instance, was forced to censor its programming. Although the subject matter in the censored exhibit—Kirstin Ivey's The Phallus Series—was of an adult nature, the obscenity of the sculptures was questionable. The phallus-shaped sculptures were approximately one metre high and fashioned from old prom dresses filled with batting. TNG's staff were discouraged by the fact that they were forced to censor the work based on the title alone; according to staff member Tim Westbury, Eau Claire management never viewed the work in person and judged it only on the title of the exhibition.

The move to Eau Claire also located TNG at the very north end of downtown Calgary, away from the area known as the Cultural District, which stretches from approximately 5th Avenue SW to 9th Avenue SW, and from 3rd Street SE to 1st Street SW. In light of its distance from other galleries, and given the potential for future disputes with mall management, the Board decided to relocate the Gallery. At the end of 2009, TNG left Eau Claire for a new home in Art Central, an arts complex in the centre of Calgary's cultural district.

TNG held its Holiday Tree Show, a winter fundraiser, in its new location on December 18, 2009. The first exhibition in the new space officially opened on January 7, 2010.

== Organization and mandate ==
TNG is a member-driven organization. After paying nominal membership fees, members are invited to elect a representative Board of Directors from the membership. In turn, the Board hires staff members to attend to the day-to-day operation of the gallery.

The number of staff members at TNG varies, although there are usually two full-time permanent staff members, and a third staff member when funding is available. The two permanent staff members have the role of Programming Director and administrative director.

TNG's mandate, as listed on its website, is as follows: "Established in 1975, The New Gallery is an active artist-run centre for the presentation and promotion of contemporary art in Calgary. Through exhibitions, performances, discussions and educational resources, The New Gallery stimulates critical discourse, recognizes diversity, develops collaborative networks and promotes a public appreciation of current art practices."

== Programming ==
A peer jury selects all of the exhibitions featured at TNG. The jury chooses work that is in line with the Gallery's mandate. Often, the jury will select critically engaged work that reflects current trends and issues. The form in which the work is presented is irrelevant; TNG will show work in any media. Artists who exhibit at TNG may be emerging, mid-career, or established. Some artists who have shows at TNG early in their careers go on to become well known in the art community.

== Artists ==
A small selection of Canadian artists who have exhibited at TNG include:

- Evan Penny, Sculpture, 1981
- Gisele Amantea, Sculpture, 1982
- Rita McKeogh, Urban Scroungers, 1984
- Allan Harding MacKay, The Mohammed Mountain Question: an extended drawing, 1987
- ManWoman, Manwoman: A Retrospective, 1987
- Janet Cardiff, The Whispering Room, 1991
- Kent Monkman, The Museum Show, 1994
- Germaine Koh and Janice Kerbel, Bodies of Evidence, 1995
- Joane Cardinal Schubert, curator of Looking and Seeing, 1998
- Wanda Koop, See Everything, See Nothing, 1998
- David Garneau, group show, Appropriation: Alchemy or Commodity?, 2000
- Beck Gilmer-Osborne, A Thousand Cuts, 2018

TNG has also featured performances and readings by:

- William S. Burroughs, A Bust of William Burroughs, 1980 (co-sponsored by Clouds 'n' Water, Murdoch Burnett, and SAIT.)
- Michael Ondaatje, Poetry reading, February 11, 1981
- Whoopi Goldberg, Pygmy Thighs, 1982

== Funding ==
There are three major funding bodies that allow TNG to operate: the Canada Council, the Alberta Foundation for the Arts, and Calgary Arts Development. TNG also receives occasional project funding from non-governmental foundations.

TNG generates revenue from casinos that are held every 18 months. Volunteers make significant contributions to the Gallery, ultimately reducing the Gallery's expenses and increasing the scope of the work that can be completed.

== Bibliography ==
- Mabie, Don, ed. (1985). The First Ten, 1975-1985: The Catalogue. Calgary, Alberta: New Gallery Press.
- Jacobson, Melody, ed. (2000). Silver: 25 Years of Artist-Run Culture, 1975-2000. Calgary, Alberta: New Gallery Press.
