= Stirnemann =

Stirnemann is a German surname. Notable people with the surname include:

- Matthias Stirnemann (born 1991), Swiss cyclist
- M. Vänçi Stirnemann (born 1951), Swiss artist, writer and curator

== See also ==
- Gunda Niemann-Stirnemann (born 1966), German speed skater
