= Canadian artist-run centres =

Canadian artist-run centres (ARC or ARCs) are exhibition, production and dissemination spaces developed by artists in Canada since the 1960s. The artist-run centre is the common term of use for artist-initiated and managed organizations in Canada. Most centres follow the not-for-profit arts organization model, do not charge admission fees, pay artists for their contributions (exhibitions, presentations, performances) are non-commercial and de-emphasize the selling of artwork.

== Origins ==
The centres were created originally in response to a lack of opportunity to present contemporary work, especially in the 1960s and 1970s experimental art practices such as performance, installation, conceptual art and video in Canada and with the desire to network with other artists nationally and internationally. The early artist-run centres in Canada were critical of the commodification of traditional art forms exhibited in mainstream galleries and institutions which did not show emerging and experimental works, interdisciplinary practices or the works of marginalized artists. In the 1990s there were over 100 artist-run centres across Canada. Today there are at least 60 artist-run centres with continuous operating funding.

Similar artist-run organizations have been developed worldwide. In the US, they are commonly identified by the term artist-run space and in Australia by the term artist-run initiative (ARI).

== Focus ==
Each artist-run centre has a unique program, but most present contemporary art by Canadian and international artists, often in combination with critical writing and other public events such as lectures, performances, screenings, etc. The centres have tended to focus on emerging artists and artists working outside the commercial gallery system.

== Support ==
=== Funding ===
The primary source of funding for artist-run centres is the Canada Council which has a specific program of two-year operating support for artist-run centres. Most centres also receive funding from the Provincial governments, most of which have an arts council to financially assist individual artists and arts organizations. Centres may also receive funding from their local municipal or city governments.

=== Support for artists ===
Artist-run centres create opportunities for artists to present their work. Centres typically accept submissions openly and make selections by a peer jury process although some centres also use curators to select projects.

Canadian artist-run centres are committed to the principle of paying artists for the exhibition or presentation of their work. Indeed, centres are required to do so if they receive funding from the Canada Council. A recommended minimum fee schedule for payment is provided by Canadian Artists Representation (CARFAC), a non-profit artists' advocacy group founded in 1968 that serves as the national voice of Canada's professional visual artists. CAR first suggested fee schedules to Canadian galleries in 1968; by 1971 they came more widely into use as a result of a threatened boycott of galleries by CAR members. In 1988 the payment of an Exhibition Right for the public exhibition of artistic production became part of Canadian federal copyright law with an amendment to the Canadian Copyright Act (R.S., 1985, c. C-42) recognizing artists as the primary producers of culture and giving artists legal entitlement to exhibition and other fees.

=== Advocacy ===
Artist-run centres advocate an artist-centric approach, promoting artists' self-determination of what to present and how to present it. This approach has widely influenced the contemporary art scene.

== Bibliography ==
- Bonin, Vincent, ed. "Documentary Protocols/Protocoles Documentaires (1967–1975)." Montreal: Galerie Leonard et Bina Ellen Gallery, 2010. ISBN 978-2920394810
- Bronson, AA, ed. "From Sea to Shining Sea: Chronology of Artist-Initiated Activities in Canada 1939–1987." Toronto: Power Plant, 1987. ISBN 0921047207
- Bronson, AA "The Humiliation of the Bureaucrat: Artist-Run Centres as Museums by Artists." Museums by Artists. AA Bronson and Peggy Gale, eds. Art Metropole, Toronto 1983. pp. 29–37. ISBN 0-920956-13-0
- Durand, Guy Sioui. "L'art comme alternative: réseaux et pratiques d'art parallèle au Québec 1976-1996." Québec: Éditions Intervention, 1997. ISBN 2920500147
- Gilbert, Bastien et al. "Decentre: Concerning Artist-Run Culture / À propos de centres d'artistes." Toronto: YYZ, 2008. ISBN 9780920397558
- Khonsary, Jeff and Kristina Podesva, eds. Institutions by Artists: Volume One Vancouver: Fillip Editions and the Pacific Association of Artist Run Centres, 2012. ISBN 978-1-927354-02-5
- O’Brian, Melanie, ed. "Vancouver Art & Economies." Vancouver: Arsenal Pulp Press and Artspeak, 2007. ISBN 978-1551522142
- Robertson, Clive. "Policy matters: Administrations of art and culture." TORONTO: YYZ Books, 2006. ISBN 0920397360
- Tuer, Dot. "Mining the Media Archive: Essays on Art, Technology, and Cultural Resistance." Toronto: YYZ Books, 2005. ISBN 0920397352
- Wallace, Keith "A Particular History of Artist-Run Centres in Vancouver." Vancouver Anthology 2nd Edition. Stan Douglas ed. Or Gallery, Talon Books, Vancouver 2011. pp. 29–51. ISBN 978-0-88922-614-2
