= Big Music =

Big Music may refer to:

- Big Music (record label), an Indian record label
- Big Music (Simple Minds album), 2014
- Big Music (Machinations album), 1985
- "The Big Music", 1984 song by the Waterboys
- Big music, a subgenre of new wave music named after the Waterboys song and distinguished by a highly polished and arena-oriented sound

== See also ==
- Big Music Fest, an annual music festival held in Southern Ontario, Canada
