= Amantea (surname) =

Amantea is a surname of Italian origin. It originated as a habitational name for the Amantea municipality in the Calabria region of southern Italy.

Notable people with the surname include:

- Antonio Amantea (1894–1983), Italian military aviator
- Bruno Amantea ({circa|1750)–1819), Italian physician
- Gisele Amantea (born 1953), Canadian artist
- Giuseppe Amantea (1885–1966), Italian physiologist
- Luigi Amantea (1869–1949), Italian army officer
