= Bobcaygeon =

Community in Ontario, Canada

- Community
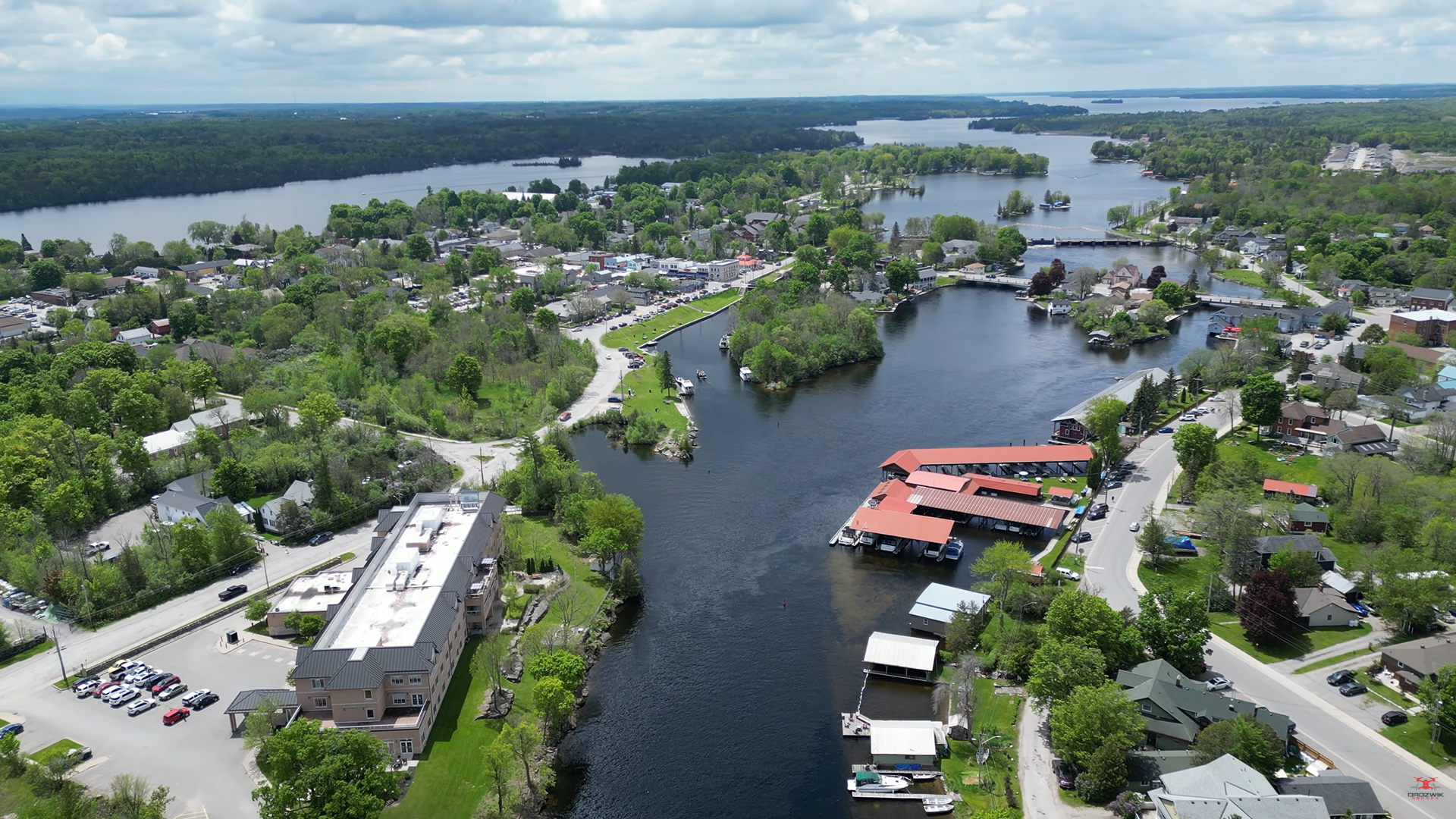
- Bobcaygeon and the Trent-Severn Waterway

- Location within City of Kawartha Lakes Location within Southern Ontario
- Coordinates: 44°32′49″N 78°33′28″W
- Country: Canada
- Province: Ontario
- Municipality: Kawartha Lakes
- Incorporated: 1876
- Amalgamated: 2000

Area
  - Total: 5.48 km^{2} (2.12 sq mi)

Population (2016)
  - Total: 3,525
  - Density: 645.3/km^{2} (1,671/sq mi)
- Time zone: UTC-5 (EST)
  - Summer (DST): UTC-4 (EDT)
- GNBC Unique ID: FDUHW

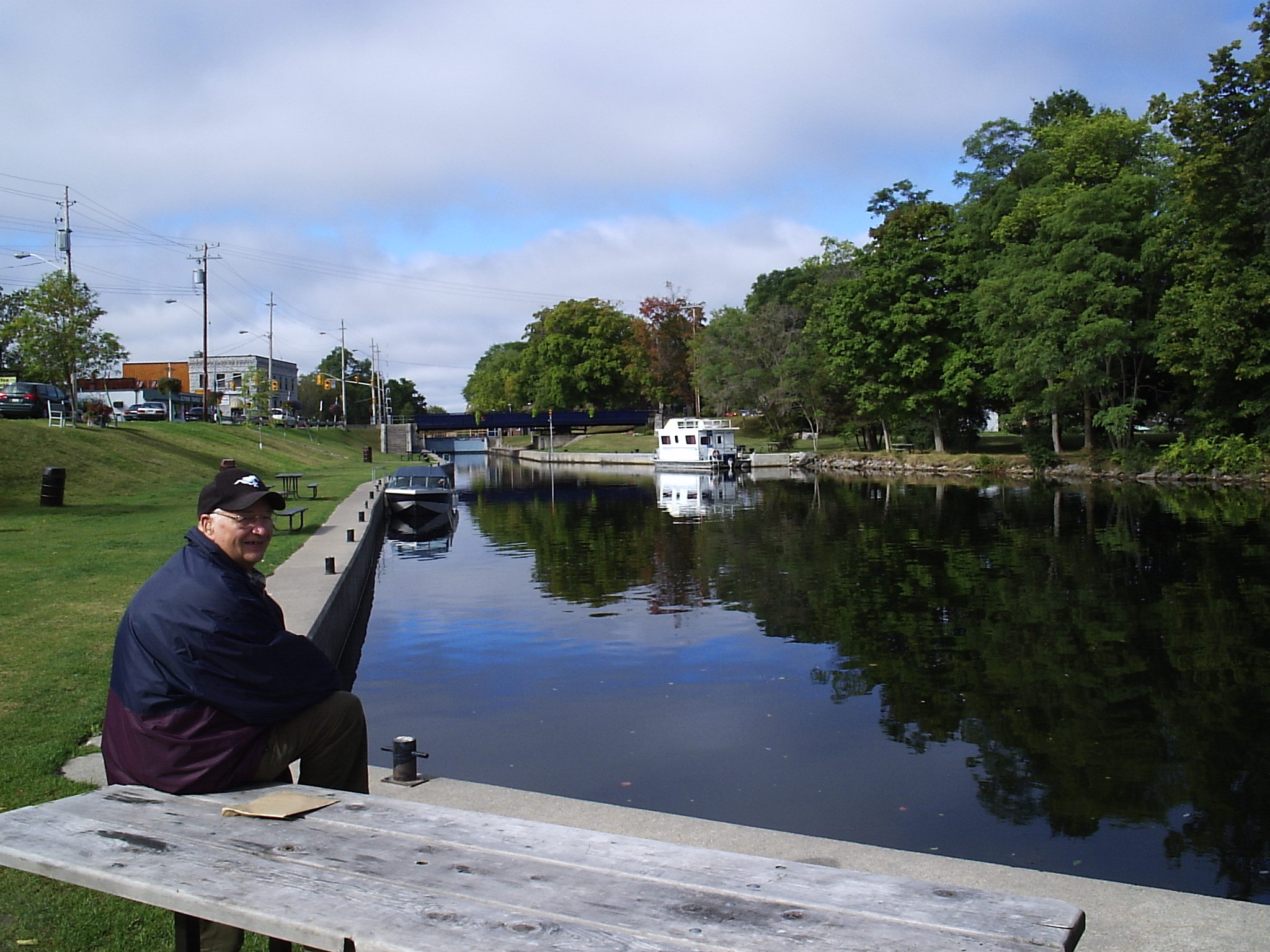
Locks at Bobcaygeon

The Boyd Arch was transferred stone by stone to its new location in front of the Boyd Museum

Bobcaygeon is a community on the Trent–Severn Waterway in the City of Kawartha Lakes, east-central Ontario, Canada.

Bobcaygeon was incorporated as a village in 1876, and became known as the "Hub of the Kawarthas". Its recorded name bob-ca-je-wan-unk comes either from the Mississauga Ojibway word baabaagwaajiwanaang "at the very shallow currents", giishkaabikojiwanaang "at the cliffed cascades" or obaabikojiwanaang "at currented rocky narrows", or from the French beau bocage "beautiful hedged farmland". The first lock in the Trent-Severn Waterway was built in Bobcaygeon in 1833.

The town is situated on three islands, along with the mainland.

Bobcaygeon's chief industry is tourism, particularly related to recreational fishing. Bobcaygeon is a hub for the region, providing many of the services unavailable in the smaller neighbouring communities.

== History ==
French explorer Samuel de Champlain, during his 1615 military expedition through the French colony of Canada in New France, passed through the area that would later become Bobcaygeon. In 1763, France ceded the colony to Great Britain, and it continued as the British colony of the Province of Quebec. In 1791, the colony was divided, with the area including the future Bobcaygeon becoming part of Upper Canada.

By the early 1830s, the colonial government of Upper Canada had completed its survey of the Township of Verulam and the area began to attract settlers. Thomas Need, who arrived in 1833, is recognized as one of the earliest settlers of the Township of Verulam and is the founder of Bobcaygeon. With his purchase of 3,000 acres (12 km^{2}) of land, Need built a sawmill, gristmill, and the first store.

In 1833, the government began construction of a lock and canal at the narrows between Pigeon Lake and Sturgeon Lake. This was the first lock constructed on the Trent–Severn Waterway. The community began to develop around the lock, sawmill and gristmill. Need became the first postmaster of the growing community.

The government had reserved and surveyed a town site on the north bank of Bobcaygeon River between Sturgeon and Pigeon Lakes, which was named Rokeby by visiting Lieutenant Governor John Colborne. Need laid out streets and plotted lots on the island, which was named Bobcaygeon. Today, Bobcaygeon designates an area on both sides of the Bobcaygeon River, after the post office was established on the island by postmaster Need.

In 1841, the colony of Upper Canada merged into the new colony of the Province of Canada. In 1844, Need sold his profitable business interests to Mossom Boyd, and returned to England. In the 1850s, the economic development of Bobcaygeon was stimulated by Boyd's lumbering business, as he and his sons built up a logging enterprise that was recognized as the third largest logging operation in Upper Canada. In addition to timbering, the Boyds also operated a system of steamboats under the name Trent Valley Navigation Company, as well as an experimental beefalo herd on Boyd Island. Descendants of this herd remain in Alberta.

With Canadian Confederation in 1867, Bobcaygeon became part of the province of Ontario in the new country of Canada. By 1869, Bobcaygeon was a village with a population of 800 in the Township of Verulam, Victoria County. There was a good trade in lumber, limestone, hides, grain and the GalKay lead mine. There were stagecoaches to the Ontario communities of Lindsay, Peterborough and Minden. In summer, boats travelled to Lindsay and Peterborough. The average price of land was $20 per acre (equivalent to $638 in 2025).

Bobcaygeon, with a population of about 1,000, was incorporated as a village by a Victoria County by-law in 1876.

A group of local businessmen worked for many years to bring a railway into Bobcaygeon. Sir Sam Hughes sat on the board of the Lindsay, Pontypool & Bobcaygeon Railway. The line was leased to the Canadian Pacific Railway on completion. In July 1904 the first passenger train steamed into town. The service lasted until 1957, the railway lands becoming the Beach Park.

The village government joined with the Township of Verulam in 1999. In 2000, it was amalgamated with the other municipalities of Victoria County by the provincial government following the recommendations of the Victoria County Restructuring Commission, led by commissioner Harry Kitchen. Now Bobcaygeon exists as a community within the City of Kawartha Lakes.

== Education ==
- Bobcaygeon Public School

== Media ==
- The Bobcaygeon Independent was the local newspaper, established in 1869. Its last issue was printed in December 2004.
- The Central Ontario Visitor, another local publication, was printed and released weekly with the Bobcaygeon Independent between the months of May through October from 1985 to 1999.
- The Promoter, one of the town's last remaining independent local newspapers, published its first issue on March 15, 1991.

== In popular culture ==
The Tragically Hip released a song entitled "Bobcaygeon" in 1998. Although it was not specifically written about the town (which was chosen to complete a rhyme), the song has still been culturally associated with Bobcaygeon. In 2011, as part of Big Music Fest, the Tragically Hip performed a concert in Bobcaygeon. In 2016, a viewing event for the band's final concert in Kingston was held on Bobcaygeon's main street. The crowd of roughly 5,000 made it the largest public event in the community's history, with attendance boosted by fans who travelled specifically to Bobcaygeon. A candlelight vigil was held in Bobcaygeon on the night following the death of the band's lead singer and lyricist, Gord Downie.

In 2001, Bobcaygeon hosted an episode of the OLN reality television series Drifters: The Water Wars as they passed through the Trent–Severn Waterway.

== Events ==
- The village's Canada Day festivities are held at Tommy Anderson Park, and its fireworks display is held at Beach Park.
- During the last weekend in May or the first weekend in June, Bobcaygeon hosts an "Unlock The Summer" Event, as a kick off for summer, and the first opening of the locks of the season.
- Bobcaygeon hosts the annual Ontario Open Fiddle & Stepdance Competition during the last weekend of July. The first was held in October 1970, as part of the annual Fall Fair. It became the Ontario Open Fiddle Contest in 1971, and became a separate event with a July event date in 1973. In 1974, with the addition of step-dancing to the contest, it became the "Ontario Open Fiddle & Stepdance Competition".
- The annual Bobcaygeon Fall Fair takes place during the last weekend of September. The first was held in 1858.
- Bobcaygeon hosts an annual cruisefest for classic and custom cars in the second week of September. The first was held in 1996.
- The Kawartha Settlers' Village in Bobcaygeon holds the town's annual Festival of Trees in the second week of November. The first was held in 1997.
- Sponsored by local churches & merchants, the annual Bobcaygeon House Tour takes place in mid-June, where six Bobcaygeon homes are toured, along with an art show at the Trinity United Church. The first was held in 1992.
- The Canada/US Walleye Tournament takes place in May, with weigh-in and outdoors show hosted at the Bobcaygeon-Verulam Community Centre.

== Notable people ==
- Brady Austin, professional hockey player
- Allan Stanley, professional hockey player
- B.G-Osborne, transmedia artist
