= Michael Heisch =

Swiss composer

Michael Heisch (born 20 May 1963) is a Swiss composer, double bass player, cultural critic and illustrator.

== Life ==
Heisch was born in 1963 in Schaffhausen as son of the writer and satirist Peter Heisch. From the age of seven he received piano lessons from Henri Chappat. He first completed an apprenticeship as an advertising assistant. From 1980, Heisch took private double bass lessons with Bruno Brandenberger. From 1981 to 1984 he then studied with Yoan Goilav at the Winterthur Conservatory, from 1989 to 1991 with Hämi Hämmerli at the St. Gallen Jazz School and from 1991 with Andreas Cincera at the Zurich University of the Arts. From 1990 to 1991 he simultaneously completed a preliminary course at the School for Design in Romanshorn.

From 1990 to 1994 Heisch studied theory with Martin Neukom and Christian Bänninger at the School of Music Theory in Zurich as well as composition with Hans Ulrich Lehmann and choral conducting and conducting with Christian Siegmann and Johannes Schöllhorn. From 1994 to 1995 he studied synthetic sound analysis with Gerald Bennett at the Zurich Conservatory. From 1998 to 2002 he then studied composition with Johannes Schöllhorn and Mathias Steinauer at the Zurich-Winterthur University of Music and Drama.

Heisch lives as a composer and cultural journalist in Zurich. As a double bass player he has already worked with the musicians Luigi Archetti, Sebastian Hofmann, Mart Lorenz and M. Vänçi Stirnemann. He is a member of the composers' collective of the Swiss Centre for Computer Music (SZCM), Member of the Board of the International Society for Contemporary Music, Zurich section and the Forum for Contemporary Music ADESSO.

== Work ==
- Eisenfresser (1996). Electroacoustic music for tape
- Theuth I and Theuth II (1996). Electroacoustic music for tape
- Flaneur (1996). Electroacoustic music for tape
- 5 Serifen für Streichtrio (1997) for violin, viola and cello
- 5 logogrammes (1997) for flute solo
- orchestral arrangements (1997) after 4 piano pieces by Franz Liszt
- Edison (1998). Electroacoustic music for tape
- Moiré - Studies for 4 organettes (1999) for 4 organettes
- Agnus Dei (1999). Electroacoustic music for tape and organ
- Zirufim (1999). Electroacoustic music for tape and electric guitar
- Schule des Schweigens (1999/2000). A kind of mini music theatre for tape, actor and obligatory cassette recorder
- Brouillage / Bruitage (1999, rev. 2002) for double bass
- ...stumpffeine Linie von Geviertlänge... I to V (2000). Electroacoustic music for tape, work-in-progress
- wechselspielwechsel I. Fall (2000) for organ and percussion
- Brouillage / Bruitage (2000, rev. 2003) for piano
- Night Bites (2000) for string quartet and speaker
- Vogel fliegt, Fisch schwimmt, Mensch läuft (2001). Chamber/hearing/play/piece for actors and musicians and tape recordings
- Chinese Cookies (2001) for saxophone quartet and speaker
- wechselspielwechsel II. Fälle (2001) for accordion and percussion
- 6 serifs (2001) for soprano and piano
- Kitchen Accidents (2002) for percussion quartet and speaker
- Everblacks - five fake Weanalieda (2002) for voice, bassoon, piano, viola and double bass
- Brouillage / Bruitage (2002) for actor
- Best before: see lid (2002) for 2 pianoforte, celesta and harpsichord
- Night Bites - every Night (2003) for string orchestra and speaker
- zu rich (2003) for voice, violoncello, piano and turntables
- carpe noctem (2004) for bass flute, electric guitar and percussion
- kykloi (2004). Solo/voice/percussion
- Im Bauch des Türken (2004). Piano solo
- Rondo (2005). Short opera for variable instrumentation
- anadiplosis / parekbasis (2005) for flute, violoncello and piano
- Disintegration (2005) for clarinet, accordion and double bass
- Disintegration (transcription, 2008) for saxophone, accordion and violoncello
- Arc (2008) for saxophone, violoncello and piano
- Schattenboxen (2008/09) for singer, ensemble, boxers and actors
- How would Lubitsch have done it? (2010) for flute, clarinet, violin, violoncello, piano and percussion
- Bouillage/Bruitage - Penelope (2010) for percussion
- Bouillage/Bruitage - Circe (2010) for (alto) flute
- Moiré (2011) for saxophone, piano and percussion

== Discography ==
- 2008: Jack In The Box (DVD)
- 2008: Niederländische Sprichwörter
- 2010: Frozen Solid
- 2010: Schattenboxen (DVD)
