= Mossom Boyd =

Canadian businessman (1814-1883)

- Born: 7 December 1814; India
- Died: 24 July 1883 (aged 68)
- Occupation: Businessman

Mossom Boyd (7 December 1814 – 24 July 1883) was an Anglo-Irish entrepreneur who developed and operated a large lumber business on the Trent river system in Ontario, Canada.

== Biography ==
=== Early life ===
Mossom Boyd was born in India to Captain Gardiner Boyd, ‘a North of Ireland officer of the Bengal Army,’ and his wife Arabella Chadwick. Both of his parents died in 1829 during the cholera epidemic, after which, Mossom Boyd and his sister Anne were sent to live with guardians in London. Because their behaviour was considered ‘difficult’, they were promptly relocated to Ireland's Derry district to live with an aunt. Boyd expected to be called upon to serve in the British Army, but after the Napoleonic Wars fewer men were recruited. At the same time, modern production methods were reducing other opportunities for employment in Ireland. Boyd, encouraged by his friend John Darcus, decided to join the many others emigrating to Britain's North American colonies, and left for Canada.

=== Life in Canada ===
Landing in Canada in 1834, Boyd made the long trek to his newly acquired 100 acres (0.40 km^{2}) of land in Verulam Township. Upon arrival, Boyd began clearing the land, and soon befriended some of the ‘gentleman' farmers, including members of the Need, Langton, and Dunsford families. The connections made with these members of the local gentry helped Boyd make the transition from working farmer to a successful entrepreneur. Anne Langton described him as a ‘most resolute home-stayer and a very industrious settler,’ who ‘has chopped all his own land himself.’ She declared ‘he is a favourite of mine; he is not brilliant or animated, but has much goodness and kindness, and simplicity of character, and is an example to all our young men for industry, attention to business, and study of economy.’

In 1844 Boyd solidified his connections with John Langton and the Dunsford family by marrying Caroline Dunsford. This led to a short-lived partnership between Boyd and John Langton. In 1845 Mossom and Caroline's first son, Gardiner Boyd, was born. Caroline and Mossom had six children altogether: Gardiner, Anne, Mary Arabella, Caroline, Mossom Martin, and Emma Blackall. Boyd's wife Caroline died a year after the birth of her last child, Emma, in 1857; Boyd was left with six children under twelve. Unable to maintain his business while caring for the children, Boyd contacted Letitia Magee Cust, a childhood friend from Derry, proposing marriage. He warned her that she ‘may not find me at all what you imagine or be able to conceive what effects such a rough life may have had on me, both in appearance and in all other respects.’ Letitia agreed to undertake the long journey alone to Bobcaygeon. Upon her arrival she married Boyd and took control over house and children, eventually adding to the brood with three of her own, one of whom died. Mossom Martin attended school until age sixteen, after which he worked in his father's lumbering business. One of Boyd's other sons, William (W.T.C.) from his marriage with Letitia, was also inducted into the family business. In 1880 an addition was built over the south wing of the Boyd home; these new rooms were for Boyd's private use during his illness. Mossom Boyd died on the evening of July 24, 1883, and was buried in the Peterborough cemetery on July 27, 1883.

== Lumbering ==
Boyd was a hard worker, clearing all of his own land upon arrival in Verulam Township. When after a few years Boyd found farming to be less profitable than expected, he hired himself out to mind Thomas Need's sawmill and store, on the site which is now Bobcaygeon, while Need returned to England for business. This provided Boyd with some cash, and opportunity for future advancement. Need increasingly relied on Boyd to look after his property and mill as he made more and more frequent trips to England. On March 15, 1843 Need began leasing ‘part of lot 15 in Concession X, Verulam, the mill reserve, with "gristmill, sawmill and tenement thereon", for a term of seven years,’ costing £40 per annum to Boyd. The same year as Boyd's marriage to Caroline (1844) Need received his inheritance, which enabled him to permanently return to England.

John Langton writes about Boyd:

‘Boyd is an Irishman whose blood got an extra boiling by being born in India… Boyd is admirably adapted in many respects for the work he is at. When a raft is once started almost everything must yield to dispatch, and a restless being who can keep himself and everything that comes in contact with him in a state of excitement for two or three months at a time is just the man to drive a river."

Because of Langton's ill health, Boyd and Langton's partnership in 1849 did not last, and upon his recovery in 1851, Langton made a transition from lumbering to politics.

In 1851, Need leased his roughly 8 acres (32,000 m^{2}), and two mills to Boyd for 21 years with an annual rent of £15 a year for the first seven years. Boyd was given the right to purchase the lot and mills for £500 after five years. By paying £100 a year Boyd was able to buy Need out by 1855.

=== Quebec ===
There was a large demand for Canadian white pine, oak, and elm, both in Europe and America, with the result that lumber prices were high. Conditions at the Quebec City harbour were conducive to lumber trade, and the superior quality of Boyd's pine logs gave him an edge in the competitive Quebec market. Boyd manned his first river driving expedition to Quebec City in 1848, with the help of a neighbour, Kelly. He began his journey early in the spring with a quantity of masts, but the strong current caused by melting snow and heavy rainfall delayed their arrival at Peterborough until July, three months after they began. At this point Kelly dropped out; Boyd continued on, reaching Quebec late in the season, and selling all of the pine.

The following year, Boyd formed a partnership with John Langton and James Dunsford, but both lacked enthusiasm for the Quebec trade and soon removed themselves from the business. Langton remained involved with Boyd after he withdrew, often backing Boyd when his credit was low. After 1851 Boyd operated on his own. Boyd was one of the last lumbermen to participate in the Quebec market.

=== Expansion ===
Around the 1850s Mossom Boyd began to expand his lumber activities. He purchased Crown land ‘in the northern part of Verulam as well as in Somerville and Harvey townships.’ Boyd was able to clear these lands of their best pine, and later sell them to prospective settlers. These partially cleared lands were a more favourable purchase for the settlers, who often found clearing heavily forested areas daunting.

In the 1860s the Department of Crown Lands began to recognize the advantages of having land cleared before settlement commenced. The Crown auctioned rights to clear Snowdon, Glamorgan, and Monmouth townships, which Boyd was able to acquire. The length of time these rights would remain available to Boyd was not guaranteed, so he was reluctant to expand further without gaining a contract that would survive a minimum of ten years. The opportune moment came in 1861, when The Canadian Land & Emigration Company purchased the townships which are now in the county of Haliburton. Because fewer than 80 families moved onto the land that they had purchased from CL&E, the company decided to sell one township with little viable farmland to the lumber company Thompson & Dodge. The outright sale of the land angered company member C.R. Stewart, who resigned. He advised his brother Hartley Stewart to contract with a lumberman to harvest the larger trees in the remaining nine townships. With existing operations on the Trent water system, Boyd was able to get the cutting rights on Canadian Land & Emigration Company Land for 10 years.

Boyd's business expanded as far as Ottawa and Quebec, and by 1882 he had begun sending rangers to explore Nipissing, Manitoba, and Minnesota. A Gravenhurst firm cut the lumber from his land in Havelock, which was later shipped into Buffalo. At the time of his death, lumbering around northern Peterborough had come to a halt, as well as in Burnt River. His last timber raft went to Quebec in 1883.

== Legacy ==
Mossom Boyd's lumbering company was taken over by his two sons: Mossom Martin Boyd, and William Thornton Cust Boyd. They continued to operate the company until the First World War.
