= Wanda Koop =

Canadian artist (born 1951)

Wanda Koop CM OM RCA
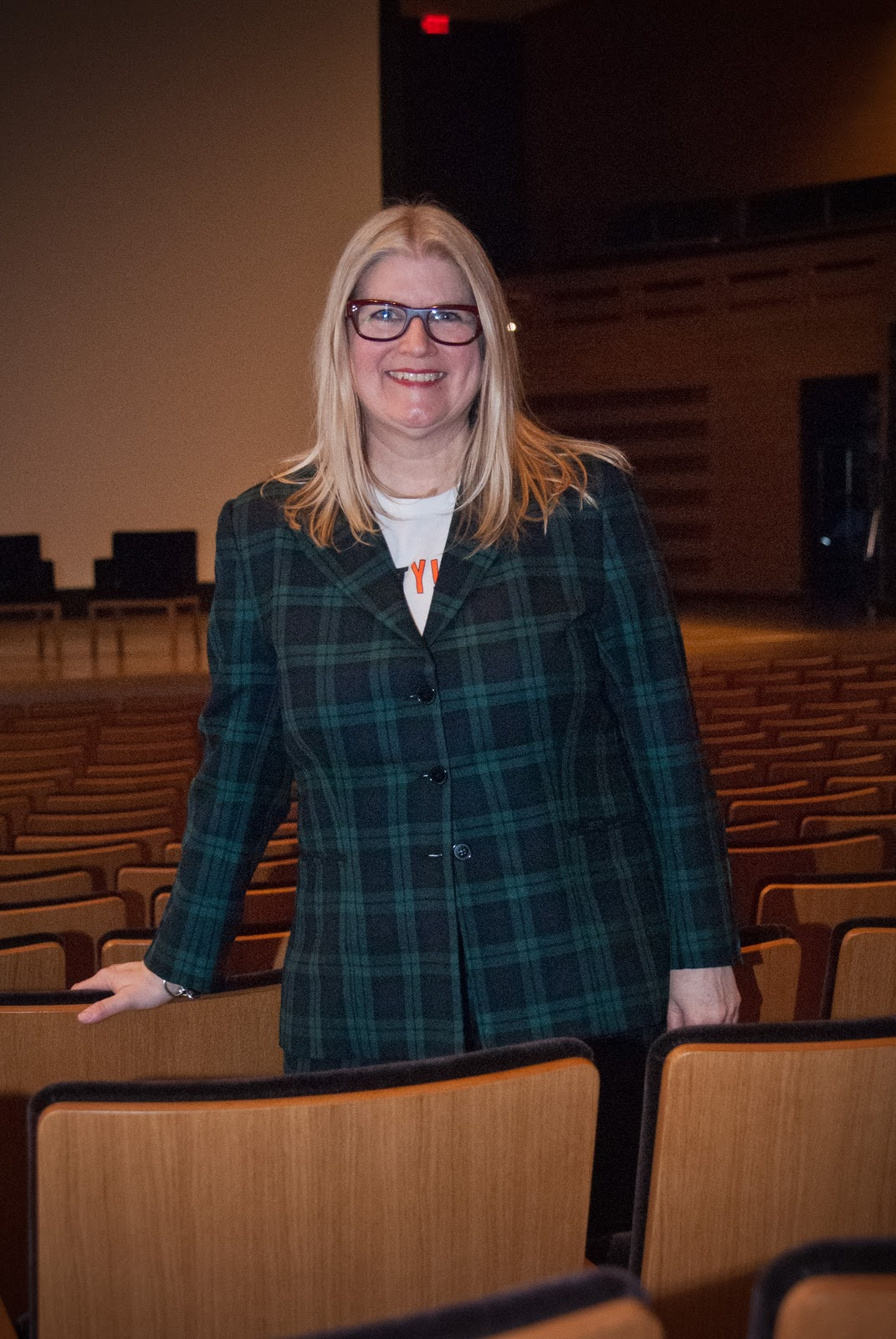
- Koop at the Canadian Art Reel Artists Film Festival in 2012
- Born: November 5, 1951 (age 74); Vancouver, British Columbia, Canada
- Website: wandakoop.com

Wanda Koop CM OM RCA is a Canadian interdisciplinary artist who lives and works in Winnipeg, Manitoba. She is a community activist, and founded Art City, a free community art centre for inner city youth in Winnipeg (1998).

== Life ==
Koop was born on November 5, 1951, in Vancouver, British Columbia, to German-speaking Mennonite parents from Zaporizhia region of present-day Ukraine.

She graduated from the Lemoine FitzGerald School of Art, University of Manitoba, Winnipeg in 1973.

In 2002, Koop was awarded the Queen Elizabeth II Golden Jubilee Medal. In 2005, she was elected to the Royal Canadian Academy of Arts. In 2006, she was appointed a member of the Order of Canada. In 2016, she received the Governor General's Awards in Visual and Media Arts.

Koop and her mother were the subjects of the 2007 documentary Wanda Koop: In Her Eyes, about their visit to Russia, where Koop's mother was born.

== Work ==
While still studying at the University of Manitoba School of Art, in 1972, Koop's work was included in an exhibition at the Winnipeg Art Gallery. Throughout the 1980s, 1990s, and 2000s, Koop was the subject of numerous solo exhibitions, including the 1985 travelling exhibition Airplanes and the Wall; the 1991 travelling exhibition Wanda Koop: Recent Paintings; and the 1998 exhibit See Everything, See Nothing at The New Gallery. From February 18 to May 15, 2011, her solo exhibition entitled On the Edge of Experience was shown at the National Gallery of Canada in Ottawa, Ontario.

Koop's work often combines aspects of video, performance, or photography. As Robin Laurence describes in the Spring 2000 issue of Canadian Art, Koop "is interested in expanding the languages of paint and video, integrating them into the complex terms of loss and grief and reclamation."

Her Barcode Face series created a new Canadian landscape. Koop revisited the series in 2021, as it was included in the group exhibition A Thought Sublime at Marianne Boesky Gallery in New York City. In 2022, her exhibition View From Here was one of the shows which accompanied the opening of the new Inuit art building at the Winnipeg Art Gallery. Also in 2022, her exhibition Wanda Koop: Lightworks was shown at the McMichael Canadian Art Collection. In 2024, she showed a new body of work at the Montreal Museum of Fine Arts in her first monographic exhibition in Quebec titled Wanda Koop: Who Owns the Moon.

== Community activism ==
In addition to her art, Koop is an ardent community activist. In 1998 she founded Art City, a community art centre in Winnipeg's West Broadway neighbourhood as a way to bring together contemporary visual artists and inner-city youth.

== Selected awards and honours ==
- Queen Elizabeth II Golden Jubilee Medal (2002)
- Doctor of Letters from the University of Winnipeg (2002)
- Order of Canada (2006)
- Honorary Doctorate from the Emily Carr Institute of Art & Design in Vancouver (2007)
- Honorary Doctor of Laws from the University of Manitoba (2009)
- Queen Elizabeth II Diamond Jubilee Medal (2012)
- Governor General's Award in Visual and Media Arts (2016)
