= Don Mabie =

Canadian artist (born 1947)

- Born: Donald Edward Mabie; January 9, 1947 (age 78); Calgary, Alberta
- Known for: correspondence artist
- Spouse: Wendy Toogood (born 1947) (m. 1970)

Don Mabie (born January 9, 1947), also known as Chuck Stake, is a Canadian artist based in Nakusp, British Columbia. Mabie has been performing, drawing, assembling, trading and mailing art since the early 1970s.

== Career ==
Born in Calgary, Alberta, Mabie graduated from the Alberta College of Art, Calgary, in Fine Art in 1969, then continued his studies with post-graduate work at Instituto Allende, San Miguel de Allende.

As a member of the international performance collaborative The Nomads, he performed at the arts festival documenta 8 in Kassel, Germany in 1987. He has also performed in Zürich, Switzerland; at the INTER DADA Festival in San Francisco, USA; and on numerous occasions in Calgary at the Glenbow Museum, Illingworth Kerr Gallery, Nickle Galleries, Muttart Gallery (now the Art Gallery of Calgary), Truck, Ten Foot Henry's, The Night Gallery and The New Gallery.

== Work ==
Mabie adopted the name Chuck Stake in 1972 when he became involved with correspondence/mail art. He uses this name for most of his art activities including Artist Trading Cards since 1997. In 2002, Mabie collaborated with Swiss artist M. Vänci Stirnemann on touring The First International Biennial of Artist Trading Cards to South Australia.

In 2000 he was nominated for the Canada Council for the Arts Governor General's Awards in Visual and Media Arts.

In May 2001, Mabie was a recipient of the Alberta College of Art & Design Board of Governors' Award of Excellence for his lifetime contribution to the arts in Alberta. In June 2002, he received one of the 75 Anniversary Alberta College of Art & Design Alumni Awards of Distinction by Alberta Lieutenant Governor Lois Hole.

In August 2006, Mabie had a solo exhibition entitled ART and LIFE at the Kootenay Gallery of Art, History and Science in Castlegar, British Columbia. In January 2007, he participated in HIT OR MISS: An Exhibition of Contemporary Drawing, a group exhibition at the Triangle Gallery of Visual Arts in Calgary.[citation needed] In 2010, he co-authored the catalogue for the show No story too small to trade: a tiny library of artist trading cards and the global ATC phenomenon at the Dunlop Art Gallery, Saskatchewan.

Mabie spent ten years collaborating on operating The New Gallery with Sandra Vida.

He works are included in private and public collections in Canada, the United States and Europe such as the Alberta Foundation for the Arts and the Archives of American Art, The Smithsonian Institution.
