= B.G-Osborne =

Canadian artist

B. G-Osborne
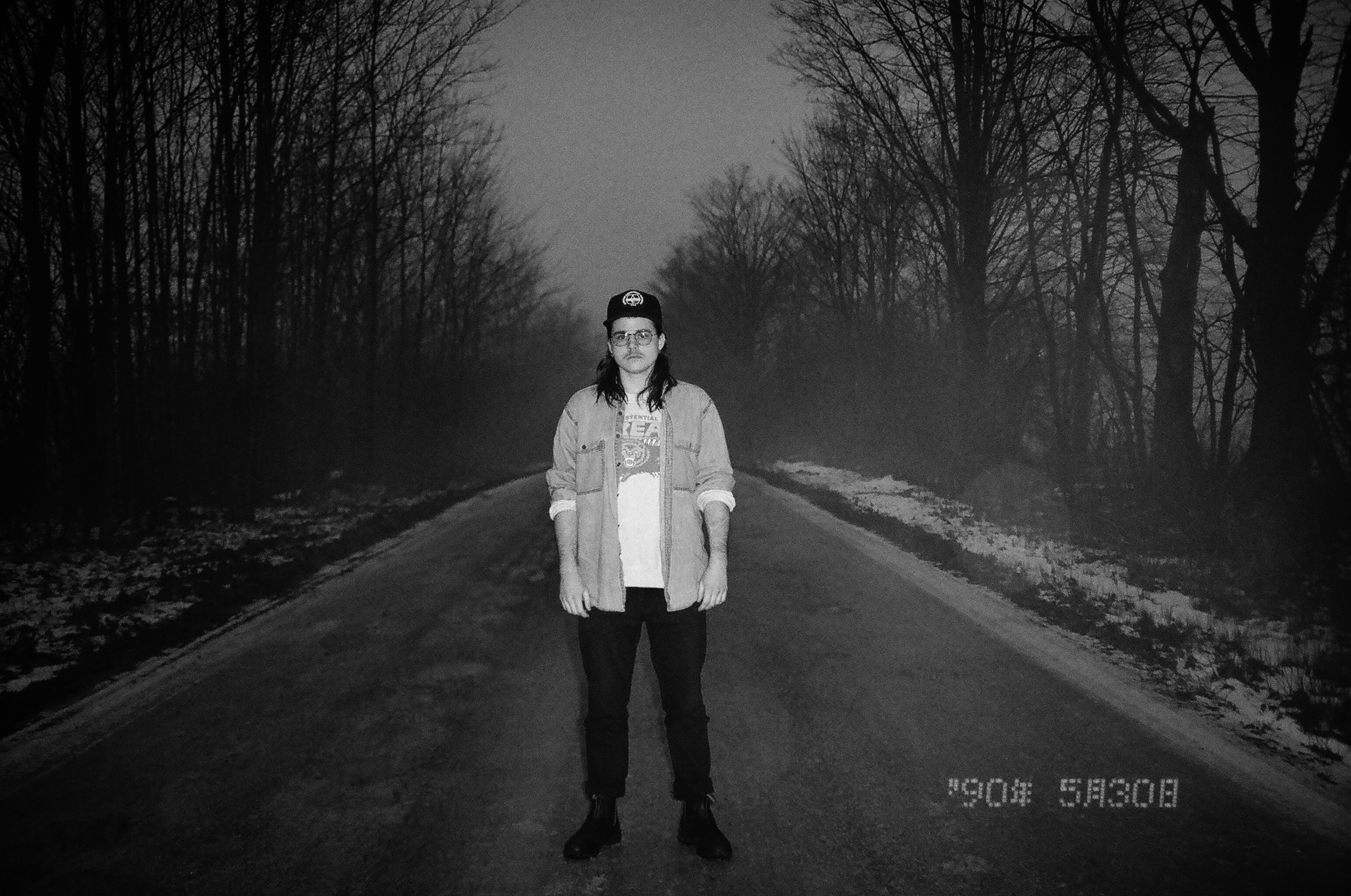
- B.G-Osborne, home town. 35mm print, photo taken by Benjamin da Silva
- Born: 1991 (age 34–35); Treaty 20 territory
- Occupation: Artist
- Website: https://bgosborne.weebly.com

Oz aka B.G-Osborne/ Beck Gilmer-Osborne (born 1991) is a queer, bigender, autistic, Transmedia artist, who was raised in rural Ontario, and currently lives in Newfoundland. Their practice deploys photography, video, installation, print media, and performance, questions of embodiment, and using their familial archives as a way to unpack and better understand their oddity, mental illnesses and connect/communicate with people.

== Early life and education ==
B.G-Osborne grew up in rural Ontario, on treaty 20 territory. They graduated from NSCAD in 2014 with a BFA in Intermedia. In 2018 they undertook a Masters of Information Studies in the Archival Studies program at McGill University.

== A Thousand Cuts ==
A Thousand Cuts is their award-winning three-channel video installation which weaves together scenes from 48 films, 34 television series, and a music video, in which cisgender actors play transgender characters. The title is a reference to the phrase "death by a thousand cuts" to allude to the video "cut" and the way popular culture media has misrepresented trans people, contributing to anti-trans violence. The work was publicly censored in 2018 by Arts Common while on view in The New Gallery’s +15 Window on the basis that folks had complained about swearing and nudity. The artist wrote an open letter to the offended viewers and despite attempts by The New Gallery to challenge the decision, find a compromise solution, and foster dialogue, ultimately the work was removed. The controversy brought significant attention to the work which subsequently went on to be screened in numerous other galleries.

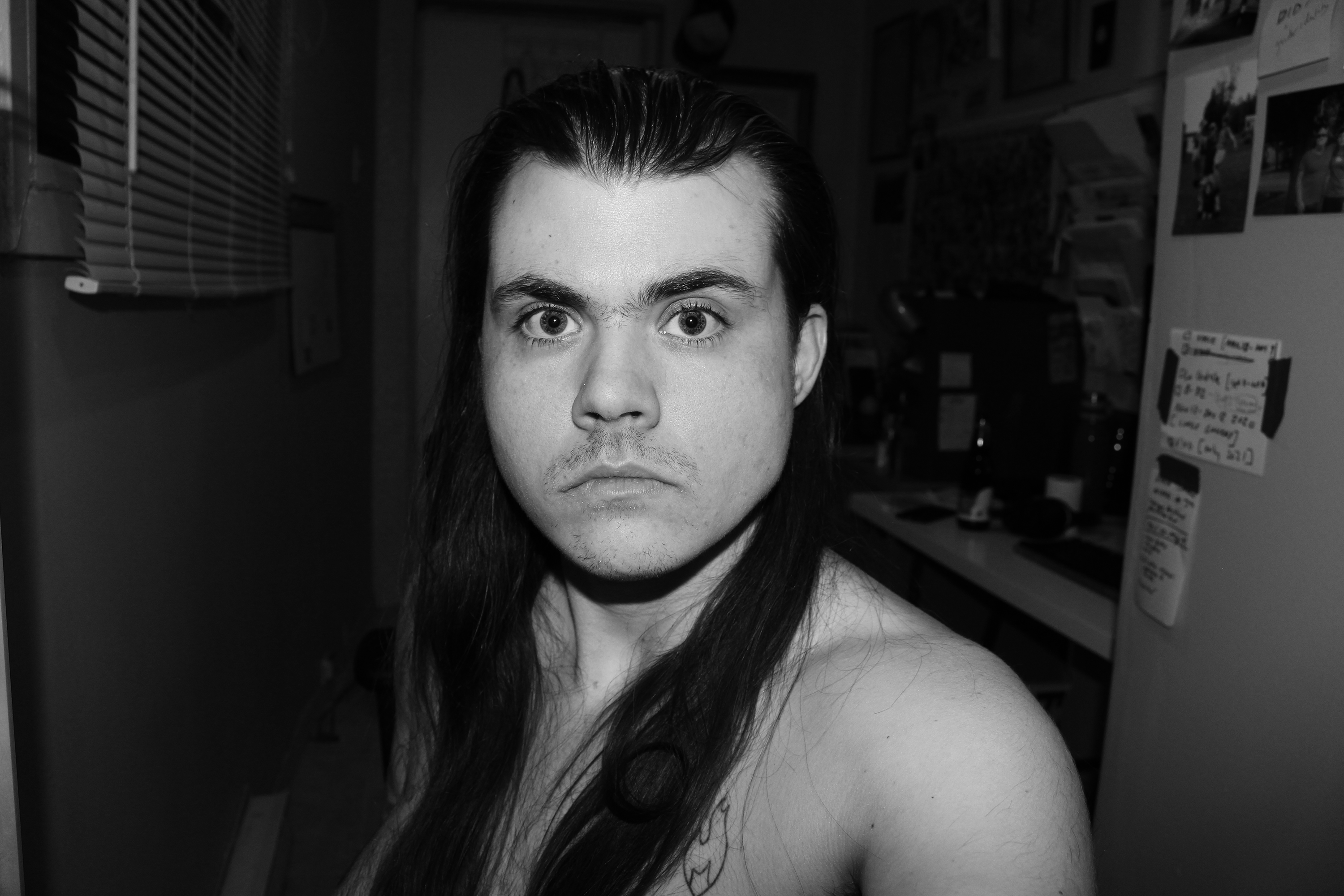
Self-Portrait in Studio. March 30, 2020

== Awards ==
In 2019 B. G-Osborne was selected by BlackFlash Magazine as the annual Optic Nerve Image Contest winner.
