= Artist trading cards =

Participatory art movement and format

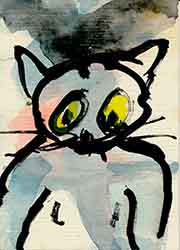
Artist trading card by M. Vänçi Stirnemann

Artist trading cards (ATCs) is a conceptual art project initiated by the Swiss artist M. Vänçi Stirnemann in 1997. He called it a Collaborative Cultural Performance. Artist trading cards are 2.5 by 3.5 inches in size, the same format as modern trading cards (such as hockey cards or baseball cards) or playing cards. They are self-made unique works or small series, signed and dated on the reverse by the artist/producer, exchanged and collected by the people who participate in the collaboration.

== The project ==
In 1996, Stirnemann began making small artworks the size of commercial trading cards. An exhibition of 1200 of Stirnemann's cards ran at his second-hand bookshop and gallery INK.art&text in Zürich, Switzerland between 23 April and 31 May 1997. The exhibition ended with a trading session. The ATC project was intended to allow people from different backgrounds to participate in an ongoing art project, which was not part of the art market. Selling or buying ATCs clearly contradicts the initial idea. Instead, people would meet at trading sessions and exchange their art work in a democratic face to face situation. Anybody can participate in the project and all techniques are allowed. ATCs are produced in various media, including dry media (pencils, pens, markers, etc.), wet media (watercolor, acrylic paints, etc.), paper media (in the form of collage, papercuts, found objects, etc.), or even metals, fibers, wax, and other materials.

A few weeks after the first ATC exhibition and trading session in Zürich, the Canadian artist Don Mabie adopted the idea and showed artist trading cards at the Alberta College of Art and Design in Calgary, Canada. In September 1997, a trading session was organized at the New Gallery in Calgary. Today, there are regular trading sessions in more than 30 cities in Europe, Canada, the US and Australia. The Zürich and Calgary trading sessions are still held on a monthly basis.

== Exhibitions and editions ==
In April 1998, editions were shown at the Academy of Fine Arts in Stuttgart, Germany, and in June and July 1998 shows and trading sessions were organized in Arnhem and Nijmegen, the Netherlands. In July 1998, the New Gallery in Calgary showed "Hot Town: Artist Trading Cards in the Summer" (curated by Don Mabie). From 15 October until 27 December 1998, an exhibition of artist trading cards (copy-left editions) took place at the Kunsthaus Zürich in Switzerland, and in May 1999, the Kunsthaus Aarau (also in Switzerland) organized a show and trading event as part of the "Salon 99" exhibition. In September 2000, a first "Artist Trading Cards Biennial" (curated by Don Mabie and M. Vänçi Stirnemann) was taking place in the New Gallery in Calgary, Canada, and in 2003, there was a large exhibition at the Kunstverein Stuttgart in Stuttgart, Germany. In May 2002, the fifth anniversary of the project was celebrated with a trading session at the Cabaret Voltaire in Zürich. In subsequent years, shows and exhibitions took place in many places in Europe, Canada, the US and Australia. ATCs were published in different catalogues, mostly performance catalogues or small press magazines.

Between 1997 and 2004, Stirnemann published 333 ATC editions (copy-left edition). For each edition of 20 copies 15 people contributed 20 ATCs. Altogether, more than 800 people from 40 countries participated in the edition project. In 2002, Cat Schick started publishing editions of "Sister Trading Cards" (STCs) with ATCs from women only.

== Historical context ==
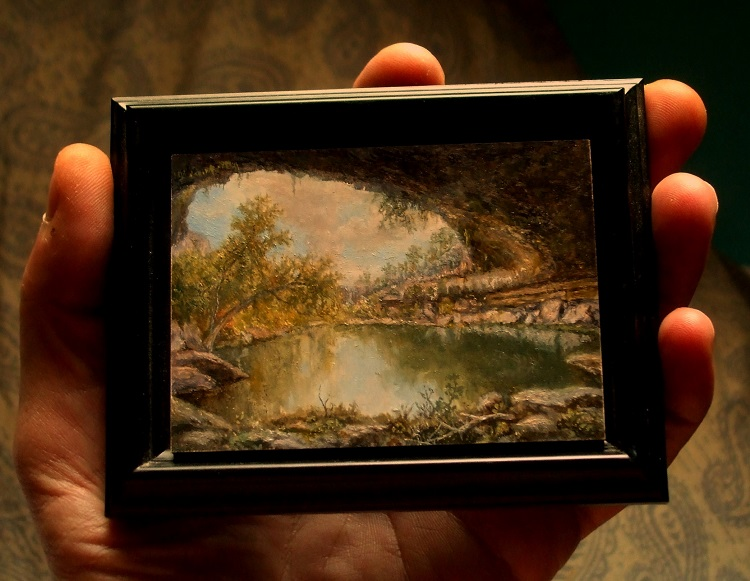
Miniature oil painting of Hamilton Pool, Texas Hill Country

The artist trading card project builds on different traditions. Miniature art has been in existence for centuries tracing its heritage back to the illustrated manuscripts of scribes in the Far East and Europe prior to the 15th century. The origin of modern trading cards is associated with cigarette cards first issued by the US-based Allen and Ginter tobacco company in 1875. They were the precursors of the sport cards and other trading cards. An important influence for the ATC concept were art movements of the 20th century which advocated a more popular art: Art not for museums or auctions but from and within everyday life. In this respect, the ATC project has affinity with the Fluxus movement and with Robert Filliou's notions of a "fête permanente", a "création permanente", or an "eternal network". The "art of participation" as an interactive process can be traced back to the 1950s, and it developed within different genres like performance art and happenings, action art, mail art, or later computer art.

== Commercialization ==
The core purpose of the ATC concept was a free exchange between the participants to establish a rapport (collaborative performance). In order to allow for profit gain and non artist collection, both the concept of a mutual exchange and the name of the cards were altered (while the size was kept). In 2004, a first ATCs offshoot was organized on eBay by Lisa Luree (eBay name bone*diva). To circumvent intellectual property rights, she called it "Art Cards, Editions and Originals" (ACEOs). It was the beginning of what an eBay staff member two years later called "eBay's home grown art movement". In 2005, Jillian Crider started the Small Format Art Group on eBay, which allowed for works "no more than 14 inches in any one direction". Whereas ATCs are rather shown in museums and special exhibitions (usually accompanied by a trading session), ACEOs are sold on auction sites, collected privately and reproduced in craft tutorials or other publications.

== See also ==
- Artistamp
- Business card
