= M. Vänçi Stirnemann =

Swiss artist, author and curator

M. Vänçi Stirnemann (born 21 April 1951 in [Zurich as Manfred Ulrich Stirnemann) is a Swiss artist, author and curator. He has been active in performance art, copy art (Xerox art), mail art and installation art. In 1997 he initiated the collaborative performance artist trading cards.

== Life ==
Stirnemann graduated from the Zurich-based art school F+F founded by progressive artists and art teachers in 1971. His mentor Serge Stauffer (who translated Marcel Duchamp's writings into German) became a close friend. Early on, Stirnemann studied genres like Mannerism, Dada, Surrealism, Art Brut, Fluxus, performance art and media art, and made himself familiar with artists like Marcel Duchamp, Marcel Broodthaers and Dieter Roth. In the 1980s, he became known to a wider public with art performances and installations. Until today, he made more than 180 international solo and collaborative performances. Stirnemann is also a curator and editor of art catalogues and art magazines. Since 1983, he publishes the art edition "copy-left". As a freelance journalist he published in different newspapers and magazines, and he was an editor at the Schweizer Radio und Fernsehen, a Swiss broadcasting company.

== Work ==
In 1986, Stirnemann was founder member of the performance groups The Nomads and a' battery a". In 1990, he initiated the international groups Feed back and forth and POW.WOW. Together with his group The Nomads he participated in the documenta 8 in Kassel, Germany, in 1987, and in the Olympic Arts Festival in Calgary, Canada, in 1988. With a grant from the Canada Council he was Visiting Foreign Artist in Calgary in 1990.

Since the early 1980, Stirnemann participated in mail art (correspondence art) and realised installations - many of them copy art projects. As a curator he organized and co-organized various art events and exhibitions, among them the "Kunstszene Zurich" 1991-92 with 260 participating artists and 18 exhibition locations. In 1997, he organized and curated the exposition "FLUXUS AND BEYOND" with the fluxus artist Ben Patterson. From 1988 onwards, Stirnemann made radio features about modern art for the alternative radio LoRa. As a writer and composer of New Music he worked with musicians and composers, among them Michael Heisch. In 1994, he opened the second-hand bookshop and gallery "INK art&text" in Zurich which existed until 2006. From 2005–2016, he taught art and design at the Hochschule Luzern in Switzerland.

In 1997, Stirnemann initiated the project artist trading cards, a "collaborative cultural performance" which became a worldwide success. Artist trading Ccrds have the same format as commercial trading cards but are original artworks or small series, signed and dated on the back-side and swapped between the participants - usually at regularly held trading sessions like they exist in about 30 cities worldwide today. Stirnemann himself has created more than 17,000 artist trading cards, of which he has exchanged more than 14,000. Between 1997 and 2004, he published 333 artist trading card editions with contributions from more than 800 people from 40 countries. Another ongoing project is his subjective encyclopedia, a collection of comments, images and everyday poetry, each entry assigned to a distinct lemma. About 500 (of more than 1000) lemmata are available on a website.

Stirnemann was awarded grants and distinctions from many different institutions, among them the Swiss Federal State, the canton and the city of Zurich, the canton Aargau, Pro Helvetia, the Cassinelli-Vogel-Stiftung, the Canada Council, and the Stanley Thomas Johnson Foundation. His copy-art projects were supported by Xerox. 2006-07 he was awarded a grant and a stay at the studio in Paris (Cité internationale des arts) from the city of Zurich.
