= Big Music Fest =

Music festival in Ontario, Canada (2008–2015)

- Genre: Music festival
- Dates: June/July
- Locations: Belleville (2008–10, 2012–13); Wiarton (2009); Owen Sound (2010, 2012); Bobcaygeon (2011); Kitchener (2014, 2015)
- Founded: 2008
- Most recent: 2015
- Attendance: 8,000 to 25,000
- Website: none

Big Music Fest was an annual music festival held in various locations in Southern Ontario, Canada. Belleville hosted every year from 2008 to 2013 with exception of 2011. Wiarton hosted an additional concert in 2009, while Owen Sound held additional concerts in 2010 and 2012. Bobcaygeon was the sole host in 2011. Kitchener was the sole host in 2014 and 2015. An anticipated return in 2016 was cancelled and no announcements have been made for 2017 as of April 4, 2017.

== Past acts ==
=== 2008 ===
Big Music Fest 2008 was held June 2008 in East Zwicks Park, Belleville, and drew a crowd of 16,000. The Tragically Hip headlined the festival, and were supported by Sam Roberts Band, Sarah Harmer, Attack in Black, and Five Star Trailer Park.

=== 2009 ===
Big Music Fest in 2009 saw two concerts for the first time, returning to Belleville and adding a show at the Wiarton-Keppel Airport in Wiarton, Ontario.

Belleville saw 10,000 fans in East Zwicks Park on June 20, this year featuring Theory of a Deadman and Our Lady Peace, with support from Blue Rodeo, Hedley, Jimmy Bowskill, and The Parlor Mob.

The Wiarton concert drew an even larger crowd, with 15,000 people in attendance to see The Tragically Hip, Sam Roberts Band, and Arkells.

=== 2010 ===
Big Music Fest 2010 again saw two concerts, retaining Belleville but moving the Wiarton show to nearby Owen Sound.

The Belleville show on June 19 featured ZZ Top, with Collective Soul, Finger Eleven, Big Sugar, Gord Downie and the Country of Miracles, Karl Wolf, and Danny Fernandes also performing.

Hedley and Our Lady Peace saw 10,000 people at Big Music Fest 2010, on July 3 in Owen Sound's Kelso Beach Park. The supporting acts included Matthew Good, Finger Eleven, David Wilcox, and Faber Drive, among others.

=== 2011 ===
Big Music Fest 2011 was held on June 25 in Bobcaygeon, Ontario, and was again headlined by The Tragically Hip who wrote a song named after the town. Supporting acts were Sam Roberts Band, The Trews, and Miss Emily. Approximately 24,500 people attended this year's festival.

The 2011 Belleville and Owen Sound editions were cancelled in April, due to low ticket sales and booking issues. If the concerts had gone ahead, this would have been the first year to see three locations host Big Music Fest.

=== 2012 ===
Like two years earlier, 2012 held two editions of Big Music Fest. The first was split into two shows, held on June 16 in East Zwicks Park, Belleville. The Belleville afternoon show featured Marianas Trench, who were supported by The New Cities and Dragonette. Three Days Grace headlined the evening show, along with Metric (band), The Sheepdogs, and Arkells. The Belleville Intelligencer estimated attendance of 8,000 people.

The second Big Music Fest of 2012 was held June 30 at Kelso Beach, Owen Sound. As in Belleville, the festival was divided into two shows on one day. The afternoon show saw Down With Webster supported by Carly Rae Jepsen and The New Cities, while the evening show, again led by Three Days Grace, featured The Trews, I Mother Earth, Arkells, and Rival Sons.

=== 2013 ===
The 2013 edition of Big Music Fest was again held in Belleville at East Zwicks Park. Burton Cummings and Band, Hedley, Counting Crows, The Wallflowers, and Bleeker Ridge performed.

=== 2014 ===
The 2014 edition of Big Music Fest was held from July 11 to 13 at McLennan Park (Mt. Trashmore) in Kitchener, Ontario for the first time. Aerosmith, Slash featuring Myles Kennedy, Bryan Adams, Styx, Collective Soul, Moist, Big Wreck, Bleeker Ridge and Kim Mitchell performed.

=== 2015 ===
The 2015 line-up included Soundgarden, Jane's Addiction, Extreme, Monster Truck, Big Sugar, and The Glorious Sons. Rod Stewart and Blondie were planned for an additional night, however poor ticket sales caused cancellation.

=== 2016 ===
The festival was planned to return for a third year in Kitchener, however was cancelled by the promoter, citing difficulty drawing "a line-up of world-class performers" but fully intending to return in 2017.

=== 2017 ===
With no announcement for 2017, the Big Music Fest website no longer live and with their Facebook page not having been updated since Aug 2015, it is assumed that Big Music Fest is no longer in operation.
