= Gisele Amantea =

Canadian visual artist and educator

- Born: 1953; Calgary
- Education: University of Calgary (BFA, 1975), University of Washington (MFA, 1979)
- Occupation(s): Visual artist, professor

Gisele Amantea is a Canadian visual artist and installation artist based in Montreal.

Amantea is most well known for her public sculpture Untitled (Poodle) (2012), which is located on Vancouver's Main Street. Untitled (Poodle) was created as part of Vancouver's public art project 88 BLOCKS Art on Main, and was the only piece in Amantea's contribution to be permanently installed. Her full work, titled Memento (Poodle), included "a suite of temporary artworks" on three trolley buses which ran along Main Street in 2012. The sculpture received mixed reactions upon installation, with then Mayor Gregor Robertson saying in a Twitter post, "Definitely not a fan of the Main St. poodle but public art is important and at times provocative!"

Other notable public works by Amantea include Red Horizontal in Vancouver's David Lam Park, and Verse by the side of the road, located at three rest stops along Quebec Highway 20.

She currently teaches at the Department of Studio Art at Montreal's Concordia University.
