= Peer jury process =

Review process in the arts

The peer jury process is often used in the arts to assess applications for grants, proposals for exhibitions made in response to an open call for submissions and art competitions. Like the practice of peer review used in the academic sphere, a peer jury brings to an evaluation process expertise that an organization or agency awarding grants or sponsoring a competition might not itself have.

In the arts context, peer assessors are selected to provide a range of relevant professional expertise and perspectives, including geographical, aesthetic, institutional and cultural viewpoints. While assessors are expected to have independence, anonymity is less of a concern than in academic peer review, in part because the task is not to catch errors or offer criticism but to only to select. For example, in Canada, agencies that award grants typically publish lists of jurors or make lists available on request.

In principle the peer jury process is an effective way for arts councils and other agencies to be responsive to and engaged with the constituencies they serve, and in touch with the latest developments in contemporary art.

== See also ==
- peer review
