= 2018 Barrie municipal election =

2018 Barrie mayoral election
- October 22, 2018
- Registered: 92,156
- Turnout: 29.65% (▼2.10pp)
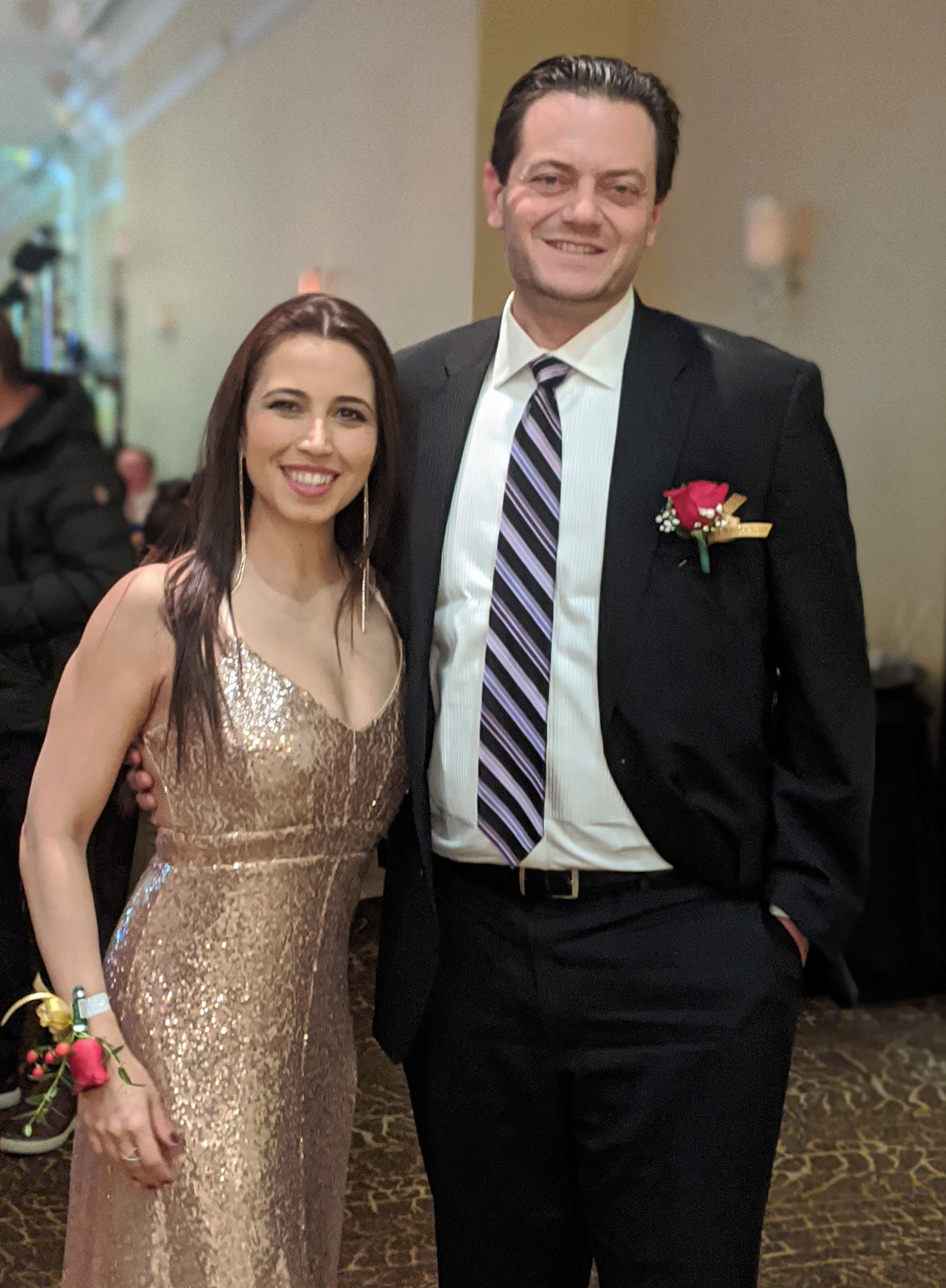
		RF
Candidate	Jeff Lehman	Ram Faerber
Popular vote	24,854	2,467
Percentage	90.97%	9.03%
- Voter turnout by ward
Mayor before election
Jeff Lehman
Elected mayor
Jeff Lehman

The 2018 Barrie municipal election was held on October 22, 2018, to elect a Mayor and 10 city councillors of the city of Barrie, Ontario, Canada. School trustees of the English-language Simcoe County District and Simcoe Muskoka Catholic District School Boards and the French-language Conseil scolaire Viamonde and Conseil scolaire catholique MonAvenir were also elected to represent the 10 wards of Barrie.

The election was held in conjunction with those held other municipalities of Ontario. In the mayoral race, incumbent mayor Jeff Lehman was re-elected with 90.97% of the popular vote. There were 38 candidates running for 10 city councillor positions – three councillors were re-elected, one was acclaimed, and six wards saw new councillors.

Voter turnout was at an all-time low at 29.65% of registered voters. Turnout would later increase in 2022 up to 30.45%.

== Results ==
The results of the election are listed below. Individuals who also won their seat in the last elections of 2014 are denoted as incumbents.

=== Mayor ===
There were two candidates for Mayor of Barrie: perennial candidate Ram Faerber and incumbent Jeff Lehman. The mayoral election had 11 declined ballots.

2018 Barrie municipal election, Mayor of Barrie
Candidate	Votes	%	±
Ram Faerber	2,467	9.03	+108.89
Jeff Lehman (incumbent)	24,854	90.97	−5.80

Candidate information:

- Ram Faerber was the owner of a recycling business. He was previously a mayoral candidate in 2014 and unsuccessfully ran for Member of Parliament of Barrie—Springwater—Oro-Medonte in the 2015 Canadian federal election and Member of Provincial Parliament of Barrie—Springwater—Oro-Medonte in the 2018 Ontario general election as an independent politician. If elected, he hoped to focus on homelessness, freeze municipal tax increases, and reducing drug addiction.
- Jeff Lehman was the incumbent Mayor of Barrie, first elected in 2010 and seeking a third term. He announced his intentions to run in March, campaigning for a "strong economy, strong society and strong neighbourhoods" for the city.

=== City Council elections ===
Votes received by each ward's elected councillor as a percentage of the total ward's votes

Each of Barrie's 10 wards had elected a councillor to the Barrie City Council. Incumbent Sergio Morales was acclaimed as councillor for Ward 9, something that only happened twice in the last 20 years.

Ward 1 Councillor
Candidate	Votes	%
Shaughna Ainsworth	852	25.98
Graham Allary	176	5.37
Ryan Cardwell	514	15.68
Erin Hennigar	61	1.86
Dusko Jankov	186	5.67
Avery Konda	113	3.45
Ann-Marie Kungl	370	11.28
Clare Riepma	974	29.70
Cole Walsh	33	1.01

Ward 2 Councillor
Candidate	Votes	%
Keenan Aylwin	1,766	42.04
Richard Forward	1,359	32.35
Yolanda T. Gallo	199	4.74
Rose Romita (incumbent)	877	20.88

Ward 3 Councillor
Candidate	Votes	%
Lynn-Anne Hill	277	12.01
Tanya Saari	415	18.00
Doug Shipley (incumbent)	1,614	69.99

Ward 4 Councillor
Candidate	Votes	%
Daniel Boucher	446	15.21
Bryan Harris	1,010	34.44
Barry Ward (incumbent)	1,477	50.36

Ward 5 Councillor
Candidate	Votes	%
Harry Ahmed	70	2.85
Brandon Cassidy	87	3.55
Peter Silveira (incumbent)	942	38.39
Robert Thomson	1,355	55.22

Ward 6 Councillor
Candidate	Votes	%
Natalie Harris	1,042	39.23
Colin Nelthorpe	153	5.76
Micheline Robichaud	524	19.73
Steve Trotter	937	35.28

Ward 7 Councillor
Candidate	Votes	%
Gary Harvey	1,066	46.94
John McEachern	67	2.95
Bonnie North	362	15.94
Andrew Prince	776	34.17

Ward 8 Councillor
Candidate	Votes	%
Jim Harris	998	30.78
Brian Miller	755	23.29
Shelly Skinner	500	15.42
Brad Thompson	989	30.51

Ward 10 Councillor
Candidate	Votes	%
Peter Culyer	86	3.46
Mike McCann (incumbent)	1,719	69.18
John Olthuis	680	27.36

=== School board trustee elections ===
Seven candidates were elected members of four different school boards across Simcoe County and the Golden Horseshoe.

SCDSB Member – Wards 1, 2, 3
Candidate	Votes	%
Gillian MacLean	2,211	33.93
David William O'Brien	2,222	34.10
Neli Trevisan	755	11.59
Amanda Trinacty	1,328	20.38

SCDSB Member – Wards 4, 5, 6
Candidate	Votes	%
Beth Mouratidis	2,914	54.23
Mike Washburn	2,459	45.77

SCDSB Member – Wards 7, 8, 9, 10
Candidate	Votes	%
Derek Dath	816	13.15
Heidi MacNeil	1,441	23.22
Ajmal Noushahi	479	7.72
David Quigley	1,089	17.55
Lisa-Marie Wilson	2,381	38.37

SMCDSB Member – Wards 1, 2, 3, 4, 5
Candidate	Votes	%
Nathaniel Brown	985	44.55
Robert Matthew LeCollier	673	30.44
Paul Rasiulis	553	25.01

SMCDSB Member – Wards 6, 7, 8, 9, 10
Candidate	Votes	%
Andrew Hall	577	28.13
Maria Hardie (incumbent)	1,299	63.33
Corey James Henderson	175	8.53

Conseil scolaire Viamonde Member – Sector 5 (Bruce, Grey, Simcoe & Dufferin Counties)
Candidate	Votes	%
Guy Belcourt	441	36.97
Saveria Caruso	292	24.48
Eric Lapointe	460	38.56

Conseil scolaire catholique MonAvenir Member – Simcoe–Muskoka
Candidate	Votes	%
Ryan Malenfant	196	15.22
Claire Thibideau	1,092	84.78

== Ward 3 by-election ==
A by-election was held on February 24, 2020, in Ward 3 to fill the vacancy of Doug Shipley, who was elected to the House of Commons. Ann-Marie Kungl, who ran unsuccessfully in Ward 1 in 2018, was elected councillor.

Ward 3 Councillor
Candidate	Votes	%
Stephen James Ciesielski	19	1.03
Ram Faerber	105	5.70
Ann-Marie Kungl	542	29.42
Gerry Marshall	176	9.55
Kelly Patterson McGrath	234	12.70
Tanya Saari	427	23.18
Devin Scully	308	16.72
Peter Silveira	31	1.68

The by-election also saw the return of Ram Faerber, Tanya Saari, and Peter Silveira, who ran for mayor, Ward 3, and Ward 5, respectively, in 2018.
