= 2022 Barrie municipal election =

- October 24, 2022
- Turnout: 30.45%
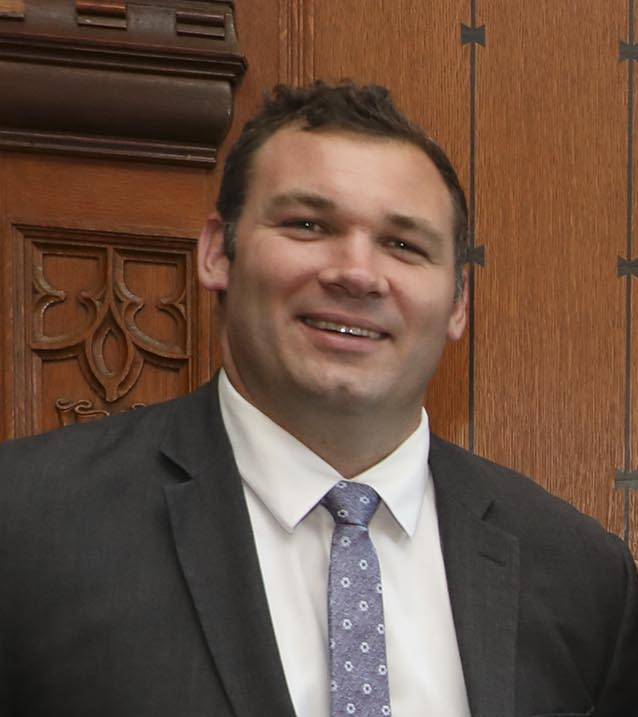
		BW
Nominee	Alex Nuttall	Barry Ward
Popular vote	13,401	12,624
Percentage	42.72%	40.24%
	GM	MM
Nominee	Gerry Marshall	Mike McCann
Popular vote	2,745	1,700
Percentage	8.75%	5.42%
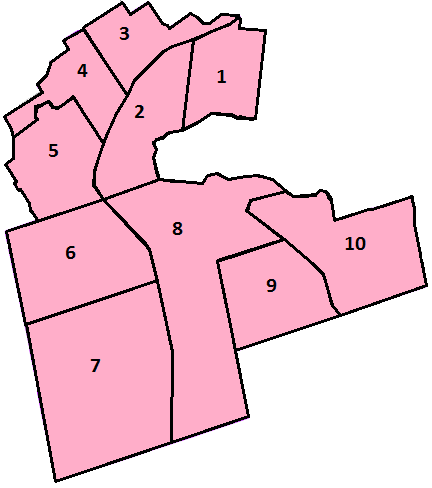
- Map of Barrie's 10 wards
Mayor before election
Jeff Lehman
Elected mayor
Alex Nuttall

The 2022 Barrie municipal election was a municipal election held on October 24, 2022, to elect the mayor of Barrie, Barrie City Councillors and the Simcoe County District School Board, Simcoe Muskoka Catholic District School Board, Conseil scolaire catholique MonAvenir and Conseil scolaire Viamonde members. The election was held on the same day as elections in every other municipality in Ontario.

The candidates registered to run for Barrie City Council are as follows:

== Mayor ==
Incumbent mayor Jeff Lehman ran in the 2022 Ontario general election for the Ontario Liberal Party in Barrie—Springwater—Oro-Medonte, losing to Progressive Conservative Doug Downey. Running to replace him is Barry Ward, a 22-year veteran of Barrie City Council; former Conservative MP Alex Nuttall; former Simcoe County Warden, mayor of Penetanguishene and Simcoe North Liberal candidate in the 2018 Ontario general election, Gerry Marshall; and Ward 10 councillor Mike McCann. City councillor Natalie Harris had also announced she was running, but dropped out.

Mayoral Candidate	Vote	%
Alex Nuttall	13,401	42.72
Barry Ward	12,624	40.24
Gerry Marshall	2,745	8.75
Mike McCann	1,700	5.42
Andrew Gordon	449	1.43
Weldon Hachey	315	1.00
Rob Haverson	134	0.43

== City Council ==
=== Ward 1 ===
Council Candidate	Vote	%
Clare Riepma (X)	1,752	49.55
Andre Jmourko	969	27.40
Constance Elliott	815	23.05

=== Ward 2 ===
Council Candidate	Vote	%
Craig Nixon	1,418	37.07
Shanicka Edwards	1,044	27.29
Greg Peach	607	15.87
Tracy Strohm	502	13.12
Bob Ossowski	184	4.81
Tif Arshi	70	1.83

=== Ward 3 ===
Council Candidate	Vote	%
Ann-Marie Kungl (X)	2,001	72.71
Ryan Rijo	424	15.41
Zohaib Tahir	327	11.88

=== Ward 4 ===
Council Candidate	Vote	%
Amy Courser	1,134	37.28
Tim Abel	770	25.31
Robert Newman	329	10.82
Dieter Mueller	257	8.45
Ajmal Noushahi	207	6.80
Donald McLaurin	185	6.08
Michael Lewis	92	3.02
Md Hafizur Rahman	68	2.24

=== Ward 5 ===
Council Candidate	Vote	%
Robert Thomson (X)	Acclaimed	

=== Ward 6 ===
Council Candidate	Vote	%
Nigussie Nigussie	1,036	30.03
Sharon Doran	884	25.62
Kevin LePage	823	23.86
Allan Bray	666	19.30
Darryl Duff	41	1.19

=== Ward 7 ===
Council Candidate	Vote	%
Gary Harvey (X)	Acclaimed	

=== Ward 8 ===
Council Candidate	Vote	%
Jim Harris (X)	2,877	79.04
John Webb	763	20.96

=== Ward 9 ===
Council Candidate	Vote	%
Sergio Morales (X)	1,427	67.76
Norman Costello	293	13.91
William Rome	251	11.92
Adam Wilcox	135	6.41

=== Ward 10 ===
Council Candidate	Vote	%
Bryn Hamilton	1,896	52.35
Joy Douglas	1,247	34.43
Ken Lloyd	246	6.79
Steven Mirtsos	233	6.43
