= 2014 Barrie municipal election =

2014 Barrie mayoral election
- October 27, 2014
- Registered: 90,089
- Turnout: 31.75%
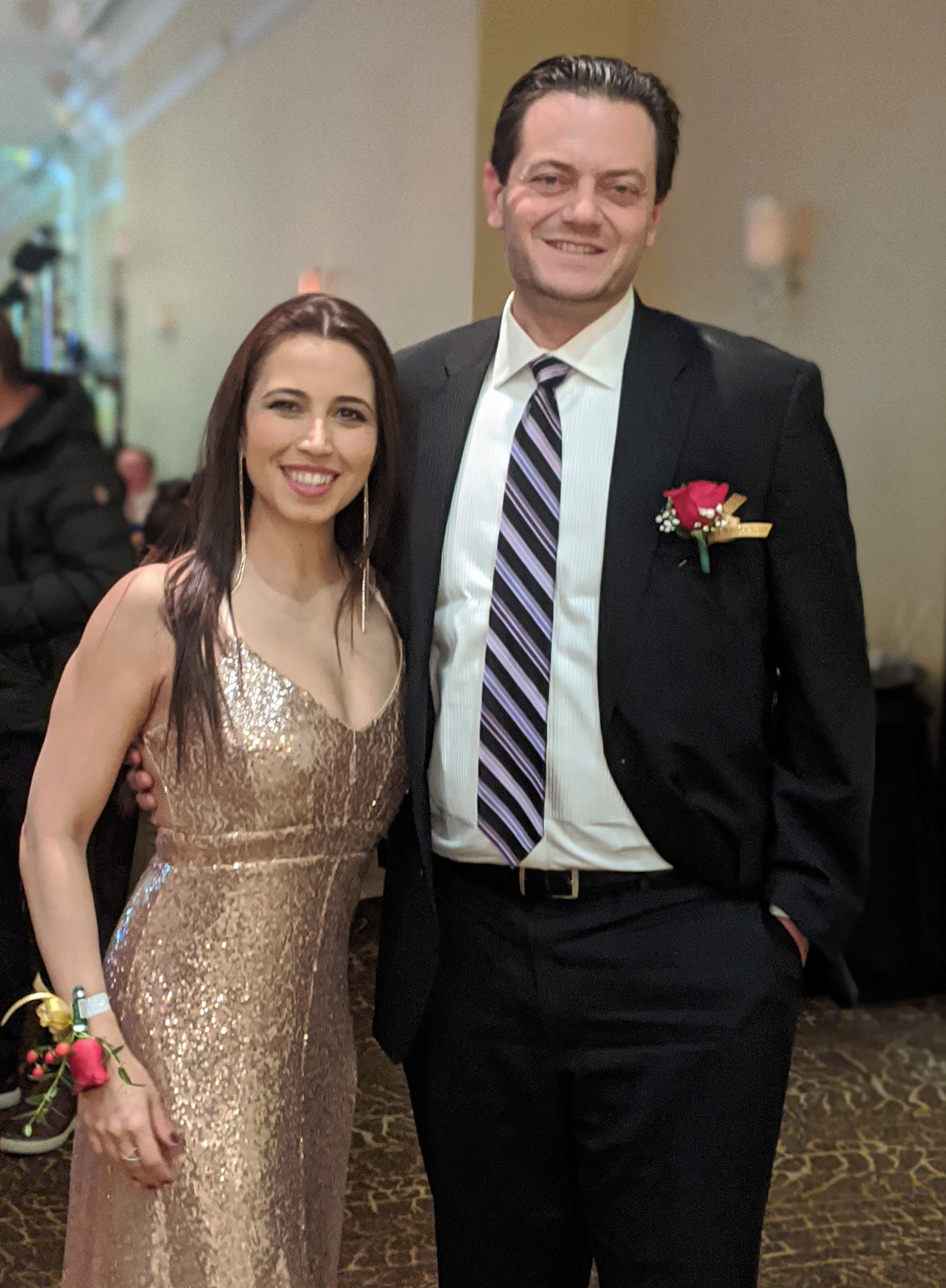
		RF
Candidate	Jeff Lehman	Ram Faerber
Popular vote	26,385	1,181
Percentage	92.25%	4.13%
	ZGR	RM
Candidate	Zachary Gillespie-Rogers	Ray Mawhinney
Popular vote	533	502
Percentage	1.86%	1.76%
- Voter turnout by ward
Mayor before election
Jeff Lehman
Elected mayor
Jeff Lehman

The 2014 Barrie municipal election was held on October 27, 2014, to elect a Mayor and 10 city councillors of the city of Barrie, Ontario, Canada. School trustees of the English-language Simcoe County District and Simcoe Muskoka Catholic District School Boards and the French-language Conseil scolaire Viamonde and Conseil scolaire de district catholique Centre-Sud were also elected to represent the 10 wards of Barrie.

The election was held in conjunction with those held other municipalities of Ontario. In the mayoral race, incumbent mayor Jeff Lehman was re-elected with 92.25% of the popular vote. There were 38 candidates running for 10 city councillor positions – 5 councillors were re-elected, one was acclaimed, and 4 wards saw new councillors.

== Results ==
The results of the election are listed below. Individuals who also won their seat in the last elections of 2010 are denoted as incumbents.

=== Mayor ===
There were four candidates for Mayor of Barrie: Ram Faerber, Zachary Gillespie-Rogers, incumbent Jeff Lehman, and Ray Mawhinney.

2014 Barrie municipal election, Mayor of Barrie
Candidate	Votes	%	±
Ram Faerber	1,181	4.13	—
Zachary Gillespie-Rogers	533	1.86	—
Jeff Lehman (incumbent)	26,385	92.25	53.05
Ray Mawhinney	502	1.76	—

Candidate information:

- Ram Faerber was the owner of a recycling business.
- Jeff Lehman was the incumbent Mayor of Barrie, first elected in 2010 and seeking a second term.

=== City Council elections ===
Votes received by each ward's elected councillor as a percentage of the total ward's votes

Each of Barrie's 10 wards had elected a councillor to the Barrie City Council. Incumbent Michael Prowse was acclaimed as councillor for Ward 6.

Ward 1 Councillor
Candidate	Votes	%
Bonnie Ainsworth (incumbent)	2,028	62.86
Clare Riepma	1,198	37.14

Ward 2 Councillor
Candidate	Votes	%
Austin Tyler Genge	55	1.38
Steve Jones	1,227	30.88
James McVeigh	1,119	28.16
Rose Romita	1,256	31.61
Barb Stuhlemmer	317	7.98

Ward 3 Councillor
Candidate	Votes	%
Ken Parsons	170	6.67
Doug Shipley (incumbent)	2,060	80.88
Ross Edwin Wuerth	317	12.45

Ward 4 Councillor
Candidate	Votes	%
Adrian Bowles	96	3.01
Justin Heran	659	20.67
Caroline Smith	1,013	31.78
Barry Ward (incumbent)	1,420	44.54

Ward 5 Councillor
Candidate	Votes	%
Harry Ahmed	231	8.5
Yvonne Heath	100	3.68
Mike Montague	462	17
Micheline Piotrowski	425	15.64
Peter Silveira (incumbent)	1,188	43.72
Robert Thomson	311	11.45

Ward 7 Councillor
Candidate	Votes	%
Andrew Barranger	85	3.6
Lincoln Bayda	252	10.66
John Brassard (incumbent)	1,779	75.25
Richard Crocitto	40	1.69
Brandon Vieira	208	8.8

Ward 8 Councillor
Candidate	Votes	%
Julia Gasewicz	760	22.18
Ghulam Jilani	31	0.9
Arif Khan	2,021	58.97
Mike McFarthing	438	12.78
Micheline Robichaud	177	5.16

Ward 9 Councillor
Candidate	Votes	%
Brian H. Jackson (incumbent)	811	43.3
Jason MacLellan	95	5.07
Sergio Morales	967	51.63

Ward 10 Councillor
Candidate	Votes	%
Graham Allary	298	10.69
Paolo Fabrizio	151	5.42
Chris Forde	330	11.84
Doug Jure	706	25.32
Mike McCann	1,303	46.74

=== School board trustee elections ===
Seven candidates were elected members of four different school boards across Simcoe County and the Golden Horseshoe. Incumbent Maria Hardie was acclaimed as member of the Simcoe Muskoka Catholic District School Board, representing Wards 6, 7, 8, 9, and 10. The Conseil scolaire de district catholique Centre-Sud would later be known as MonAvenir in 2017.

Conseil scolaire de district catholique Centre-Sud Member – Simcoe–Muskoka
Candidate	Votes	%
Donald Blais	879	64.54
Kyna Sivret	483	35.46

Conseil scolaire Viamonde Member – Sector 5 (Bruce, Grey, Simcoe & Dufferin Counties)
Candidate	Votes	%
Guy Belcourt (incumbent)	515	50.05
Eric R. Lapointe	514	49.95

SCDSB Member – Wards 1, 2, 3
Candidate	Votes	%
Kathleen Aikins	2,394	33.71
Paul Archer	1,812	25.51
Stephen Donkers	698	9.83
Suzanne Ley (incumbent)	2,198	30.95

SCDSB Member – Wards 4, 5, 6
Candidate	Votes	%
Steven George Knuff	1,167	20.64
Katherine L. Koculym	1,798	31.79
Krista Mayne (incumbent)	2,690	47.57

SCDSB Member – Wards 7, 8, 9, 10
Candidate	Votes	%
Jennifer Lynn Cameron	2,488	35.5
Jessica McConnell	1,356	19.35
Keith P. Rimmer	795	11.34
Corey Wall	692	9.87
Christine Williams (incumbent)	1,677	23.93

SMCDSB Member – Wards 1, 2, 3, 4, 5
Candidate	Votes	%
Nathan Caldwell	824	34.29
Connie Positano (incumbent)	1,579	65.71
