= Accelerating Access to Justice Act, 2021 =

Ontario, Canada statute

Legislative Assembly of Ontario
- Long title: An Act to amend and repeal various statutes, to revoke various regulations and to enact the Ontario Land Tribunal Act, 2021
- Royal assent: 19 April 2021

Legislative history
- Bill citation: Bill 245
- Introduced by: Doug Downey MPP, Attorney General (Ontario)
- First reading: 16 February 2021
- Second reading: 2 March 2021
- Third reading: 15 April 2021
- Status: Current legislation

The Accelerating Access to Justice Act, 2021 (Bill 245, 2021; French: Loi de 2021 visant à accélérer l'accès à la justice) is a law in the province of Ontario that amended the judicial appointments process in the province and made a number of other changes.

== Summary ==
The bill was an omnibus bill with 11 schedules. It made a number of changes to the judicial appointments process in Ontario, including increasing the length of appointment shortlists from two candidates to six and giving the Attorney General to reject the entire shortlist and ask for a new one.

The bill would also increase the power of the government over the Ontario’s Judicial Appointments Advisory Committee, including removing the ability of the three legal organizations with representatives on the committee (the Law Society of Ontario, the Ontario Bar Association and the Federation of Ontario Law Associations) to name their own representatives, instead having to submit a shortlist to the Attorney General, who would then name the representatives for them. The bill would also increase the number of community members the Attorney General selects on the committee.

== Legislative history ==
The bill was introduced to the Legislative Assembly by Doug Downey, Progressive Conservative MPP for Barrie—Springwater—Oro-Medonte and Attorney General of Ontario, in mid-February 2021. After passing second reading in early March 2021, the bill was reviewed by the Standing Committee on the Legislative Assembly. It passed third reading in mid-April 2021 and received royal assent from Lieutenant-Governor Elizabeth Dowdeswell on 19 April.

== Reactions ==
Supporters of the bill argued that it would allow the province to fill empty judicial positions more quickly and would help the province's judicial system to clear case backlogs.

Opponents of the bill argued that it would politicise the courts, lead to an increase in patronage appointments, and that the pre-existing appointments process was not broken. Ontario NDP leader Andrea Horwath stated that "if this is a way for the government to have more nepotism, to have more of their friends appointed to positions like the bench, that's frightening." NGO Democracy Watch pledged to fight the bill in court, stating that it would "politicize the appointment of judges in Ontario, opening it up to patronage and cronyism that will undermine the public’s confidence in the independence and impartiality of the courts."

Some supporters of the bill argued that it would allow the province to improve diversity in the judicial system. However, many organisations representing minority lawyers in the province claimed that the government had not consulted with them on the legislation. Nader Hasan of the Canadian Muslim Lawyers Association stated that "we see this as a power grab dressed up in the very thin veneer of purported diversity."

The bill was also criticised for the impact it would have on urban development, with critics arguing that it would become near impossible for individuals and community groups to have a voice in Land-Use Planning Appeal Tribunal proceedings.
