= Results breakdown of the 1993 Canadian federal election =

The 1993 Canadian federal election was held on October 25, 1993, to elect members to the House of Commons of Canada of the 35th Parliament of Canada. The incumbent Progressive Conservative Party of Prime Minister Kim Campbell, in office since June 1993, was defeated by the Liberal Party of Canada under the leadership of Jean Chrétien. The Progressive Conservatives were reduced from 156 to just 2 seats.

The emergence of the Bloc Québécois and the Reform Party took critical support from the PCs. The New Democratic Party had their worst ever results and this election remains and the only election where the party polled fewer than one million votes. The Liberals won a majority of seats, and was able to from a majority government. The strength of third parties in this election was unprecedented for Canadian politics.

In total, 194 out of 295 ridings changed hands.

== Results by region ==
=== Atlantic Canada ===
The Liberals won 30 of the 31 seats in Atlantic Canada. The other seat was St. John in New Brunswick, which Elsie Wayne held for the PCs against the national swing.

=== Quebec ===
Quebec was dominated by the Bloc Québécois, which won enough seats to form the Official Opposition. Liberals won 19 seats in and around the Island of Montreal, but their gains from the Progressive Conservatives were minimal, with 8 exceptions; Bonaventure—Îles-de-la-Madeleine, Laval West, Outremont, Pierrefonds—Dollard, Pontiac—Gatineau—Labelle, Saint-Maurice, Vaudreuil and Verdun—Saint-Paul. Progressive Conservative Minister of Industry Jean Charest held his seat of Sherbrooke, being the only MP from his party to survive the BQ surge. Former PC MP Gilles Bernier held Beauce as an Independent on a narrow majority against the insurgent BQ. He had been barred by Kim Campbell from running under the PC banner due to fraud charges, of which he was later acquitted.

=== Ontario ===
In Ontario, the Liberals won 98 of 99 seats. The exception being Simcoe Centre, which was won by Ed Harper from the Reform Party. The results were attributed to the vote splitting between the PCs and Reform which allowed the Liberals to be victorious in many of the marginal ridings in rural Southern Ontario. In many cases the Progressive Conservatives were pushed into third place in their own seats. The NDP performed particularly poorly in Ontario due to the unpopularity of Premier Bob Rae losing all of their seats to the Liberals.

=== Western Canada ===
In Western Canada, the Progressive Conservatives were wiped out. The New Democratic Party was replaced by the Reform Party as the party representing Western alienation. The Liberals won all but two seats in Manitoba. In the far west the Reform Party dominated, winning 22 of 26 seats in Alberta and 24 of 32 in British Columbia.

The Liberals won 5 seats in British Columbia and 4 in Alberta in comparison to their domination of Eastern Canada. In Saskatchewan, the NDP bucked the national trend and held onto most of their seats there. The only seats the NDP won in British Columbia were Burnaby—Kingsway and Kamloops amid the unpopularity of the provincial NDP government.

=== Northern Canada ===
In the Northwest Territories, Liberal MP Ethel Blondin-Andrew was re-elected with an increased majority. In Yukon, New Democratic Party leader Audrey McLaughlin held her seat with a decreased majority. Former Mayor of Whitehorse Don Branigan took the Liberals into second place.

== Seats changing hands ==
Progressive Conservative to Liberal (77)

- Annapolis Valley—Hants
- Bonaventure—Îles-de-la-Madeleine
- Bramalea—Gore—Malton
- Brampton
- Brandon—Souris
- Burlington
- Cambridge
- Carleton—Charlotte
- Central Nova
- Cumberland—Colchester
- Dauphin—Swan River
- Don Valley East
- Don Valley North
- Don Valley West
- Durham
- Edmonton North
- Elgin—Norfolk
- Erie
- Etobicoke Centre
- Etobicoke—Lakeshore
- Fredericton—York—Sunbury
- Fundy—Royal
- Guelph—Wellington
- Halifax West
- Halton—Peel
- Hamilton—Wentworth
- Hastings—Frontenac—Lennox and Addington
- Huron—Bruce
- Kitchener
- Lachine—Lac-Saint-Louis
- Lanark—Carleton
- Laval West
- Lincoln
- London West
- London—Middlesex
- Madawaska—Victoria
- Markham—Whitchurch—Stouffville
- Mississauga South
- Mississauga West
- Niagara Falls
- Oakville—Milton
- Ontario
- Outremont
- Oxford
- Parry Sound—Muskoka
- Perth—Wellington—Waterloo
- Peterborough
- Pierrefonds—Dollard
- Pontiac—Gatineau—Labelle
- Portage—Interlake
- Provencher
- Regina—Wascana
- Richmond
- Rosedale
- Saint-Maurice
- Sarnia—Lambton
- Scarborough Centre
- Scarborough East
- Selkirk—Red River
- Simcoe North
- Souris—Moose Mountain
- South Shore
- St. Catharines
- St. John's East
- St. John's West
- St. Paul's
- Timiskaming—French River
- Vancouver Centre
- Vancouver South
- Vaudreuil
- Verdun—Saint-Paul
- Victoria—Haliburton
- Waterloo
- Wellington—Grey—Dufferin—Simcoe
- Winnipeg South
- York—Simcoe

Progressive Conservative to Bloc Quebecois (46)

- Abitibi
- Ahuntsic
- Anjou—Rivière-des-Prairies
- Argenteuil—Papineau
- Beauharnois—Salaberry
- Beauport—Montmorency—Orléans
- Bellechasse
- Berthier—Montcalm
- Blainville—Deux-Montagnes
- Bourassa
- Brome—Missisquoi
- Champlain
- Charlesbourg
- Charlevoix
- Chateauguay
- Chicoutimi
- Drummond
- Frontenac
- Gaspé
- Hochelaga—Maisonneuve
- Joliette
- Jonquière
- Kamouraska—Rivière-du-Loup
- La Prairie
- Laurentides
- Laval Centre
- Laval East
- Lévis
- Lotbinière
- Louis-Hébert
- Manicouagan
- Matapédia—Matane
- Mégantic—Compton—Stanstead
- Mercier
- Portneuf
- Québec
- Quebec East
- Richmond—Wolfe
- Rimouski—Témiscouata
- Roberval
- Saint-Hyacinthe—Bagot
- Saint-Jean
- Témiscamingue
- Terrebonne
- Trois-Rivières
- Verchères—Les Patriotes

Progressive Conservative to Reform (35)

- Athabasca
- Calgary Centre
- Calgary North
- Calgary Northeast
- Calgary Southeast
- Calgary Southwest
- Calgary West
- Capilano—Howe Sound
- Cariboo—Chilcotin
- Crowfoot
- Delta
- Edmonton Northwest
- Edmonton Southwest
- Edmonton—Strathcona
- Elk Island
- Fraser Valley East
- Fraser Valley West
- Kindersley—Lloydminster
- Lethbridge
- Lisgar—Marquette
- Macleod
- Medicine Hat
- North Vancouver
- Okanagan Centre
- Peace River
- Prince George—Peace River
- Red Deer
- Simcoe Centre
- St. Albert
- Surrey—White Rock—South Langley
- Swift Current—Maple Creek—Assiniboia
- Vegreville
- Wetaskiwin
- Wild Rose
- Yellowhead

New Democrat to Liberal (17)

- Beaches—Woodbine
- Brant
- Churchill
- Edmonton East
- Essex—Windsor
- Nickel Belt
- Oshawa
- Prince Albert—Churchill River
- Saskatoon—Dundurn
- Saskatoon—Humboldt
- Sault Ste. Marie
- Thunder Bay—Atikokan
- Timmins—Chapleau
- Trinity—Spadina
- Vancouver East
- Victoria
- Windsor—St. Clair

New Democrat to Reform (17)

- Comox—Alberni
- Esquimalt—Juan de Fuca
- Kootenay East
- Kootenay West—Revelstoke
- Mission—Coquitlam
- Moose Jaw—Lake Centre
- Nanaimo—Cowichan
- New Westminster—Burnaby
- North Island—Powell River
- Okanagan—Shuswap
- Port Moody—Coquitlam
- Prince George—Bulkley Valley
- Saanich—Gulf Islands
- Skeena
- Surrey North
- Yorkton—Melville

Liberal to Bloc Quebecois (1)

- Shefford

New Democrat to Bloc Quebecois (1)

- Chambly
