= Jeffrey Lehman =

Jeffrey Lehman may refer to:

- Jeff Lehman (politician) (born 1975), former mayor of Barrie, Ontario, Canada
- Jeffrey S. Lehman (born 1956), American scholar, lawyer and academic administrator
