= Canadian House of Commons Standing Committee on Access to Information, Privacy and Ethics =

Standing Committee of Canadian house of commons

The House of Commons Standing Committee on Access to Information, Privacy and Ethics (ETHI) (French: Comité permanent de l’accès à l’information, de la protection des renseignements personnels et de l’éthique) is a standing committee of the House of Commons of Canada. The committee was conceived during the first session of the 38th Parliament and held its first meeting in October 2004.

== Mandate ==
- Reporting to the Parliament of Canada on issues related to ethics and privacy
- Reviewing amendments to the Lobbying Act, the Conflict of Interest Act and the Access to Information Act
- studying the reports of the Information Commissioner of Canada, the Privacy Commissioner of Canada, the Conflict of Interest and Ethics Commissioner, and the Commissioner of Lobbying Canada.

== Work ==
The committee has undertaken numerous studies over the years on topics related to information sharing, national security and privacy such as Information Sharing with the United States and Privacy in Canadian Airports. The committee has also reviewed various pieces of legislation such as the Privacy Act and created corresponding reports with recommendations and amendments. For example, the committee's 2016 Protecting the Privacy of Canadians: Review of the Privacy Act report included twenty eight recommendations to facilitate modernization of the act to account for legislative and technological changes that have occurred since the original Privacy Act was enacted.

== Membership ==
As of the 45th Canadian Parliament:

Party	Member	District
Liberal	Linda Lapointe, Vice Chair	Rivière-des-Mille-Îles
Liberal	Leslie Church	Toronto—St. Paul's
Liberal	Gurbux Saini	Fleetwood—Port Kells
Liberal	Abdelhaq Sari	Bourassa
Conservative	John Brassard, Chair	Barrie—Innisfil
Conservative	Michael Barrett	Leeds—Grenville—Thousand Islands and Rideau Lakes
Conservative	Michael Cooper	St. Albert—Edmonton
Conservative	Gabriel Hardy	Montmorency—Charlevoix
Bloc Québécois	Luc Thériault, Vice-Chair	Montcalm

== Subcommittees ==
- Subcommittee on Agenda and Procedure (SETH)
