= Janice Laking =

Canadian politician (1929–2026)

42nd Mayor of Barrie
- In office 1988–2000
- Preceded by: Ross Archer
- Succeeded by: Jim Perri

Personal details
- Born: Janice Ruth McCuaig; December 23, 1929 Barrie, Ontario, Canada
- Died: September 29, 2026 (aged 96) Barrie, Ontario, Canada

Janice Ruth Laking (née McCuaig; December 23, 1929 – September 29, 2026) was a Canadian politician who served as the mayor of Barrie, Ontario from 1988 until 2000.

== Life and career ==
Laking was born in Barrie, Ontario on December 23, 1929.

The daughter of former Simcoe North federal Member of Parliament Duncan Fletcher McCuaig, Laking was first elected to Barrie City Council in 1972. She was nominated in 1978 as the Liberal Party of Canada's candidate in Simcoe South in the 1979 federal election, but later withdrew to mount a campaign for mayor against incumbent Ross Archer. She lost that election, but was re-elected to a council seat in 1980 and served for another eight years before being elected mayor in 1988. In 1991, she won her second term in office by acclamation.

She was the Liberal candidate for Simcoe Centre in the 1993 federal election, losing by a margin of 182 votes to Reform Party candidate Ed Harper. This was the only riding in the entire province not won by a Liberal in that election, and media generally credited Harper's victory to the fact that Laking was "such a popular mayor that the voters didn't want her to leave the mayor's chair".

Laking won reelection to the mayoralty in 1994 and 1997.

She was defeated by Jim Perri in 2000, and subsequently served as a citizenship judge. She was also an Honorary Colonel of 16 Wing at CFB Borden.

Laking died at a retirement home in Barrie, on September 29, 2026, at the age of 96.
