= Robert Simpson (brewer) =

Canadian brewer and politician

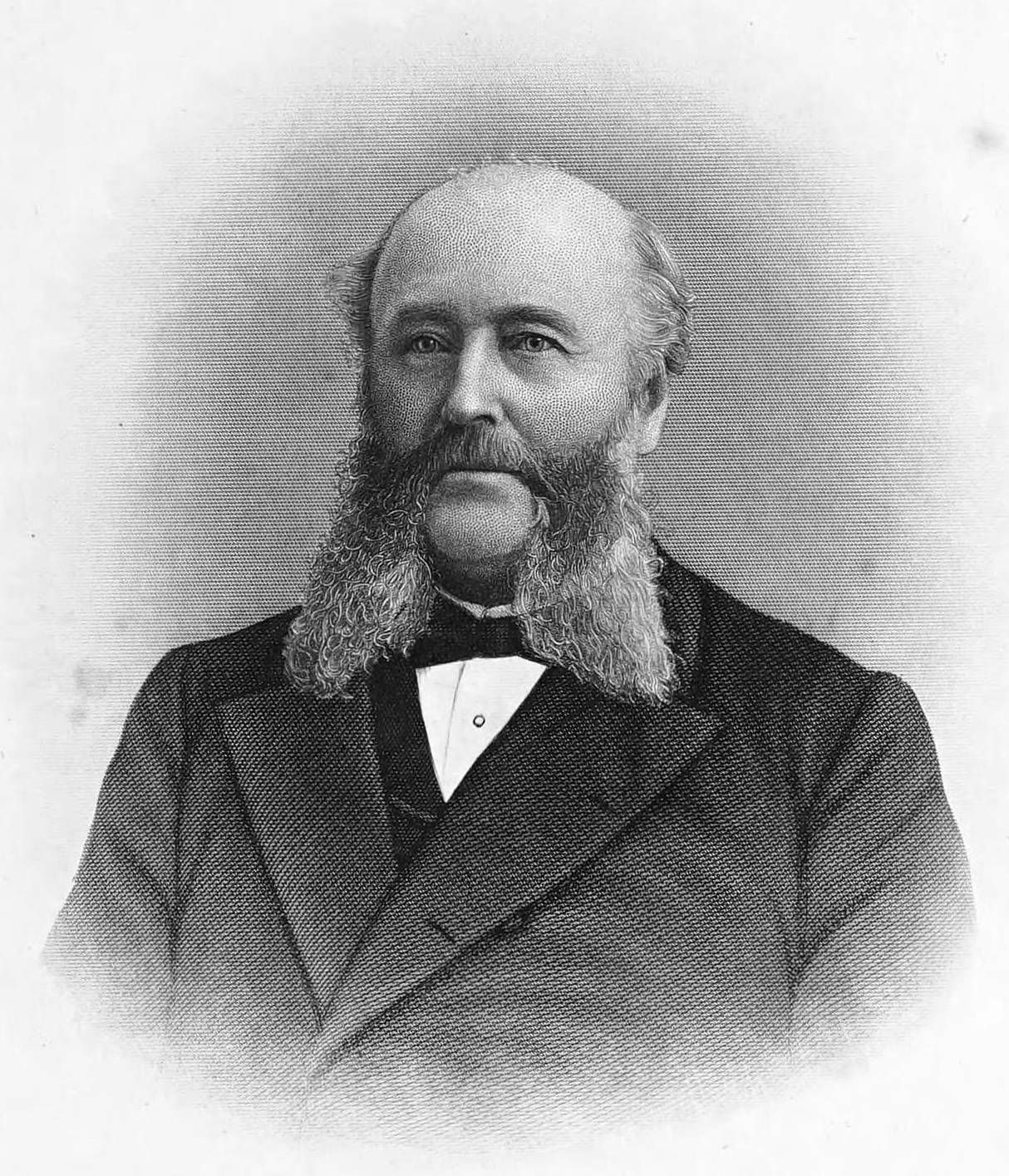
Simpson in an 1880 engraving

Robert Simpson (1817 - 1891) was a British-born Canadian brewer and politician who served as the first mayor of Barrie from 1871 to 1872, and again as its third mayor in 1876. He also founded the Simcoe Steam Brewery, and the 21st-century Robert Simpson Brewing Company (now The Flying Monkeys Craft Brewery) was named in his honour.

Prior to becoming mayor, the head of the governing body for Barrie was known as the reeve of Barrie. Simpson first served as the fifth reeve from 1858 to 1859, and was succeeded by Thomas David McConkey. Simpson later succeeded the seventh and final reeve, William Davis Ardagh, in 1871, to become Barrie's first mayor.
