= Dave Aspden =

Canadian politician

45th Mayor of Barrie
- In office December 4, 2006 – December 6, 2010
- Preceded by: Robert J. Hamilton
- Succeeded by: Jeff Lehman

Barrie City Councillor for Ward 2
- In office 2003–2006
- Succeeded by: Jeff Lehman

Personal details
- Born: David Aspden
- Occupation: Politician; police officer

David Aspden is a retired Canadian politician and former police officer who served as the 45th mayor of Barrie from 2006 to 2010.

Aspden defeated incumbent Mayor Robert J. Hamilton in the 2006 municipal election by a margin of 14,616 to 12,175 votes.

Aspden was a police officer for over 20 years and a municipal councillor for nine years, representing Ward 2 before he was elected as mayor. He has been a member of the Royal Canadian Legion for over 28 years, received the President's Award from the Navy League of Canada and is the secretary and treasurer for the Ontario Association of Police Services Boards.

On September 8, 2010, Aspden announced his intention to seek a second term in the city of Barrie, just two days before the close of nominations.

On October 25, 2010, Jeff Lehman was elected the new mayor of Barrie, succeeding Aspden who won 3.6% of the vote.

== Barrie Police Services Board ==
In January 2007, while serving as Chairman of the Barrie Police Services Board, Aspden "wrote a character reference for Const. Brian Byblow in January in connection with an Ontario Police Services Act disciplinary hearing, which found Byblow guilty of discreditable conduct relating to a May 2005 incident". Aspden's fellow councillors passed a motion on April 30, 2007 referring the matter to the Ontario Civilian Commission on Police Services.

== Trip to China ==
Aspden's trip to China in April 2007 attracted further controversy due to the alleged involvement of Chinese and Canadian land developers, as well as the Mayor's apparently secretive approach to the trip. After "in camera" meetings on April 23 and April 30, councillors passed a unanimous motion to request an OPP probe into the situation.

== Lawsuit against the City of Barrie ==
In 2012 Aspden sued his former city for damages which occurred during a torch ceremony for the 2010 Winter Olympics in 2009. Aspden alleged to have stepped on a wet surface at Barrie's city hall, which "caused his foot to suddenly, unexpectedly and without warning to slip thereby causing him to lurch, lose balance and fall forward to the concrete staircase". The former mayor is looking for damages in upwards of CA$2.5 million, as his "'injuries are so grievous that he cannot get relief from the severe, continuous and debilitating pain and he is usually so incapacitated that he lacks the strength in his shoulders, biceps, arms and hands to perform tasks as simple as twisting the cap off a bottle of water". Aspden dropped the injury claim in late 2014.
