= Sunnidale Park =

Mixed recreational and natural park in Barrie, Ontario, Canada

Coordinates: 44.396°N 79.707°W

Sunnidale Park is a mixed recreational and natural park in Barrie, Ontario. It is the largest municipal park in the city of Barrie. It is surrounded by Sunnidale Road, Cundles Rd W, Coulter St, and Highway 400. The park was previously a golf course. The park is home to the Wyman Jacques Arboretum, the Dorian Parker Centre, and it also hosts a community garden.

== Description ==
The landscape of the park is a mix of cultivated plants, turfgrass, and mixed forest. A ravine and a small creek run through the east side of the park from Cundles Road W and Highway 400. The amenities of the park include walking trails, a pollinator garden, an off-leash dog park, and a playground.

== History ==
Located within Sunnidale Park is the Dunsmore Ancestral Huron-Wendat Settlement. The site was the location of a Huron-Wendat settlement in the fifteenth century.

From 1911 to the 1960s the land was used as a nine-hole golf course for the Barrie Golf Club, and later the Barrie Country Club. In the late 1960s the land was acquired by the city of Barrie and turned into a municipal park. The park's arboretum was founded in 1974 by the Barrie Horticultural Society, and was renamed in 2018 to the Wyman Jacques Arboretum.
