= Dorian Parker =

Mayor of Barrie, Ontario
- In office 1972–1976
- Preceded by: Lester Cooke
- Succeeded by: Ross Archer

Personal details
- Born: 1923/24?
- Died: June 3, 2007

Dorian Parker was the 36th mayor of Barrie, Ontario, serving from 1972 to 1976. She was its second female mayor, following Marjorie Hamilton in the 1950s.

Parker was first elected to Barrie City Council in 1966, serving until her election as mayor in 1972. She was one of two women mayors elected to Ontario towns in 1972. She was reelected in 1974 over former mayor Bob Bentley.

She was defeated at the 1976 election, placing third behind Ross Archer. She was subsequently re-elected to city council in 1978, serving as a councillor until her retirement in 1994.

One of her most noted accomplishments in office was the acquisition of 80 acres of land being sold by the Barrie Country Club to create Sunnidale Park, which remains Barrie's largest municipal park. The park's clubhouse was renamed the Dorian Parker Centre in her honour in 2001. She remained active in local politics after her retirement, leading a campaign to oppose a city plan to build a water reservoir and pumping station in Sunnidale Park.

Parker died at the Royal Victoria Hospital in Barrie on June 3, 2007, aged 84.
