= Barrie (federal electoral district) =

Former federal electoral district in Ontario, Canada

Ontario electoral district
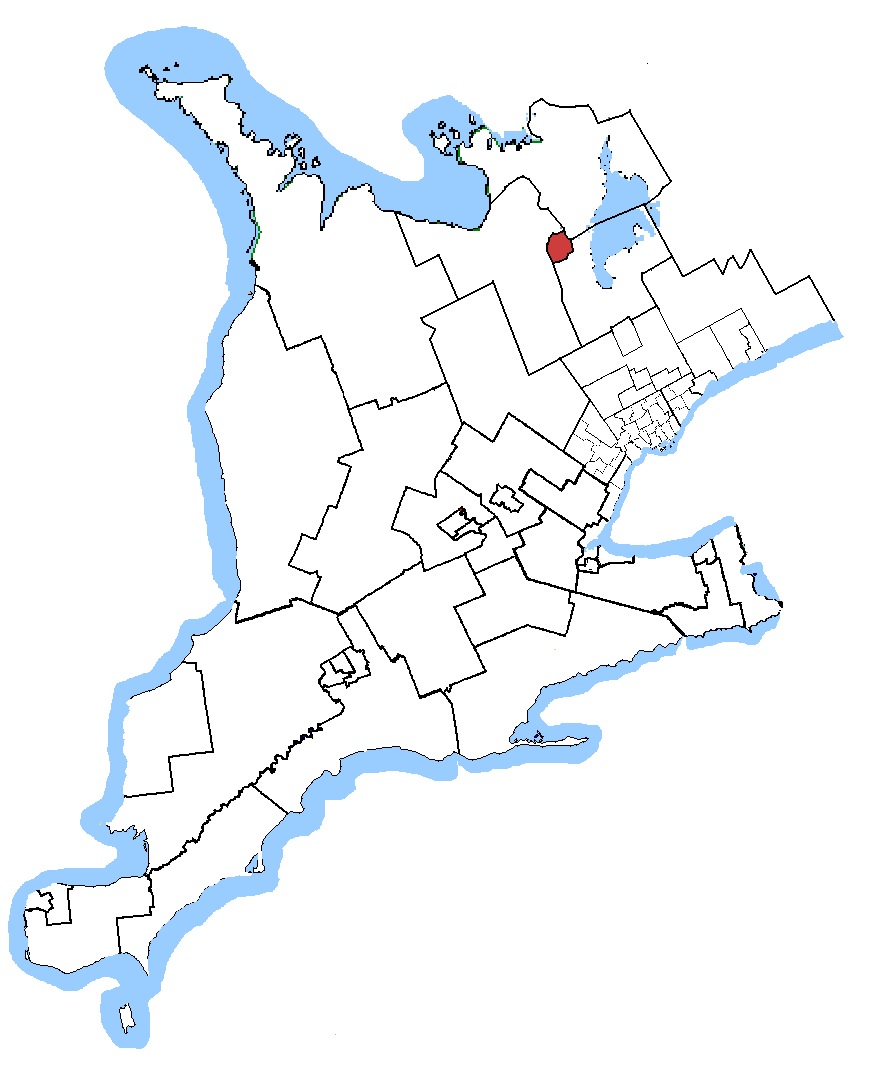
- Barrie in relation to other Ontario electoral districts
- Coordinates: 44°22′23″N 79°40′11″W; Location of the constituency office (as of 12 July 2010)

Defunct federal electoral district
- Legislature: House of Commons
- District created: 1996
- District abolished: 2013
- First contested: 1997
- Last contested: 2011
- District webpage: profile, map

Demographics
- Population (2011): 135,711
- Electors (2011): 91,447
- Area (km²): 77.39
- Census division(s): Simcoe County
- Census subdivision(s): Barrie

Barrie was a federal electoral district in Ontario, Canada that was represented in the House of Commons of Canada from 2004 to 2015. It consisted of the City of Barrie in the County of Simcoe. It was created in 2003 when its predecessor, Barrie—Simcoe—Bradford, was redistributed. Barrie—Simcoe—Bradford consisted of the City of Barrie and the towns of Bradford West Gwillimbury and Innisfil. It had been formed in 1996 as Barrie—Simcoe from Simcoe Centre and York—Simcoe ridings, but its name was changed before an election was held.

== Members of Parliament ==
Parliament	Years	Member	Party
Barrie—Simcoe—Bradford; Riding created from York—Simcoe and Simcoe Centre
36th	1997–2000	Aileen Carroll	Liberal
37th	2000–2004	Aileen Carroll	Liberal
Barrie
38th	2004–2006	Aileen Carroll	Liberal
39th	2006–2008	Patrick Brown	Conservative
40th	2008–2011	Patrick Brown	Conservative
41st	2011–2015	Patrick Brown	Conservative
Riding dissolved into Barrie—Innisfil and Barrie—Springwater—Oro-Medonte

== Adjacent ridings ==
- Simcoe North
- Simcoe—Grey
- York—Simcoe

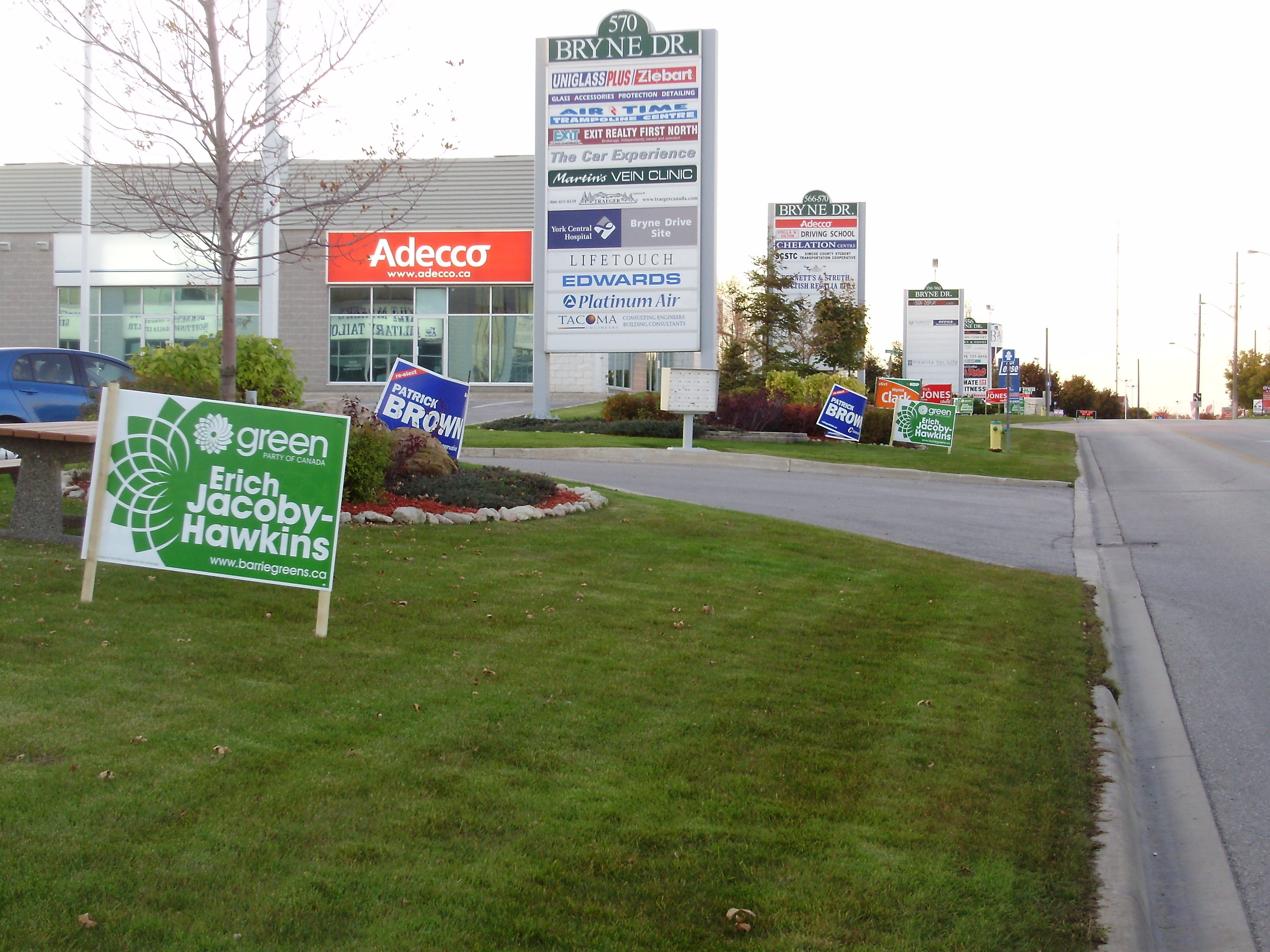
Signs for the major parties line the street in south Barrie prior to the 2008 federal election.

== Future ==
For the 2015 federal election, the city of Barrie was split into two new electoral districts, the north half became part of Barrie—Springwater—Oro-Medonte, whereas the south half became part of Barrie—Innisfil.

The Barrie—Innisfil federal electoral district consists of:

(a) that part of the County of Simcoe comprising the Town of Innisfil; and (b) that part of the City of Barrie lying southerly of a line described as follows: commencing at the intersection of the westerly limit of said city with Dunlop Street West; thence northeasterly along said street to Tiffin Street; thence southeasterly and easterly along said street to Lakeshore Drive; thence northeasterly in a straight line to the easterly limit of said city (at the intersection of the southerly limit of the Township of Oro-Medonte with the northerly limit of the Town of Innisfil).

The Barrie—Springwater—Oro-Medonte federal electoral district consists of:

(a) that part of the County of Simcoe comprising (i) the Township of Springwater; (ii) that part of the Township of Oro-Medonte lying southwesterly of a line described as follows: commencing at the intersection of the northwesterly limit of said township with 9 Line North; thence southeasterly along said line to Moonstone Road East; thence northeasterly along said road to 9 Line North; thence generally southeasterly along said line to Horseshoe Valley Road East; thence northeasterly along said road to 9 Line North; thence southeasterly along said line, its intermittent production, 9 Line South and its southeasterly production to the southerly limit of said township; and (b) that part of the City of Barrie lying northerly of a line described as follows: commencing at the intersection of the westerly limit of said city with Dunlop Street West; thence northeasterly along said street to Tiffin Street; thence southeasterly and easterly along said street to Lakeshore Drive; thence northeasterly in a straight line to the easterly limit of said city (at the intersection of the southerly limit of the Township of Oro-Medonte with the northerly limit of the Town of Innisfil).

== Election results ==
2011 Canadian federal election
Party	Candidate	Votes	%	±%	Expenditures
Conservative	Patrick Brown	32,121	56.70	+4.33	$94,892.28
New Democratic	Myrna Clark	11,842	20.90	+8.90	$15,554.25
Liberal	Colin Wilson	9,113	16.09	-7.79	$66,558.48
Green	Erich Jacoby-Hawkins	3,266	5.77	-5.34	$31,306.84
Libertarian	Darren Roskam	150	0.26	-0.22	–
Marxist–Leninist	Christine Nugent	82	0.14	-0.01	–
Canadian Action	Jeff Sakula	77	0.14	–	
Total valid votes/Expense limit		56,651	99.69	–	$96,630.18
Total rejected ballots		174	0.31	-0.00	
Turnout		56,825	59.85	+1.36	–
Eligible voters		94,939			
Conservative hold		Swing		-2.28	
Source(s) "Elections Canada Candidate Campaign Returns". Elections Canada Candidate Campaign Returns. Elections Canada.

2008 Canadian federal election
Party	Candidate	Votes	%	±%	Expenditures
Conservative	Patrick Brown	27,927	52.37	+10.5	$91,512
Liberal	Rick Jones	12,732	23.88	-15.3	$80,023
New Democratic	Myrna Clark	6,403	12.01	-0.2	$16,038
Green	Erich Jacoby-Hawkins	5,921	11.10	+4.3	$58,204
Libertarian	Paolo Fabrizio	260	0.49	N/A	$171
Marxist–Leninist	Christine Anne Nugent	84	0.16	N/A	$0
Total valid votes/Expense limit		53,327	100	$92,671	

2006 Canadian federal election
Party	Candidate	Votes	%	±%	Expenditures
Conservative	Patrick Brown	23,999	41.88	+1.8	$81,530
Liberal	Aileen Carroll	22,476	39.18	-3.5	$69,313
New Democratic	Peter Bursztyn	6,984	12.18	+1.5	$14,496
Green	Erich Jacoby-Hawkins	3,874	6.76	+0.2	$19,036

2004 Canadian federal election
Party	Candidate	Votes	%
Liberal	Aileen Carroll	21,233	42.7
Conservative	Patrick Brown	19,938	40.1
New Democratic	Peter Bursztyn	5,312	10.7
Green	Erich Jacoby-Hawkins	3,288	6.6

=== Barrie—Simcoe—Bradford (1997-2004) ===
2000 Canadian federal election: Barrie—Simcoe—Bradford
Party	Candidate	Votes	%
Liberal	Aileen Carroll	26,309	48.27
Alliance	Rob Hamilton	17,600	32.29
Progressive Conservative	Jane MacLaren	7,588	13.92
New Democratic	Keith Lindsay	2,385	4.38
Canadian Action	Ian Woods	387	0.71
Christian Heritage	Brian K. White	234	0.43

1997 Canadian federal election: Barrie—Simcoe—Bradford
Party	Candidate	Votes	%
Liberal	Aileen Carroll	23,549	43.28
Reform	Bonnie Ainsworth	16,042	29.62
Progressive Conservative	John Trotter	10,735	19.82
New Democratic	Peggy McComb	2,580	4.76
Green	Marie Sternberg	506	0.93
Christian Heritage	Dan Vander Kooi	421	0.78
Canadian Action	Ian Woods	327	0.60

== See also ==
- List of Canadian electoral districts
- Historical federal electoral districts of Canada
