= Willard Kinzie =

Canadian businessman and politician (1919–2018)

Willard L. Kinzie

36th Mayor of Barrie
- In office 1957–1961
- Preceded by: R. Eldon Greer
- Succeeded by: Lester Cooke

Barrie Town Council Alderman
- In office 1952–1953

Personal details
- Born: 19 September 1919
- Died: 25 November 2018 (aged 99) Barrie, Ontario
- Spouses: Ruth Kinzie (died 2011); Karen Hunter (m. 2016)
- Children: 3

Willard L. Kinzie (9 September 1919 – 25 November 2018) was a businessman and former mayor of Barrie, Ontario. After serving as an Alderman, Willard was elected as mayor of the then town and served at the time that it reincorporated as a city. He played a central role in many of the issues affecting Barrie, such as various annexation reviews and the development of the waterfront. As a businessman, he ran a successful milk delivery business earning him the nickname 'The Milk Man'.

== Background ==
Kinzie was raised in a farm neighbourhood, between Cambridge, Ontario and Kitchener, Ontario, during the Great Depression. With a shortage of work, he went overseas to work for government from 1942 to 1945. He used his earnings to begin his dairy career, which his father and uncles were also in.

== Personal life ==
Kinzie married Ruth Snider in 1942. The couple remained together for 67 years until her death in 2011. In 2016, Kinzie announced his engagement to longtime friend and hiking companion Karen Hunter, and the couple married later that year.

== Business career ==
In 1945 Kinzie purchased a small, one-route dairy in the Guelph area, which he sold in 1947. That same year he moved to Barrie and purchased Lakeview Dairy on Dunlop Street East which he continued to run until 1975.

== Political career ==
Kinzie was first elected as an alderman in 1952 before becoming mayor of the Town of Barrie in 1957. During his tenure, Barrie was incorporated as a city in 1959, making Kinzie its first mayor as a city. He played a significant role in shaping Barrie’s long-term urban development, particularly along the waterfront of Kempenfelt Bay.

Kinzie was a strong advocate for public access to the lakeshore and was instrumental in advancing plans for parks, beaches, and recreational space. Former mayor Jeff Lehman later referred to Kinzie as “the father of Barrie’s waterfront,” citing his role in the development of public lakeshore space.
