= Edna Anderson =

Canadian politician (1922–2019)

MP for Simcoe Centre
- In office 1988–1993
- Succeeded by: Ed Harper

Personal details
- Born: Edna Viola Falkner; 9 November 1922 St. Catharines, Ontario, Canada
- Died: 7 July 2019 (aged 96) Barrie, Ontario, Canada
- Party: Progressive Conservative Party of Canada
- Spouse: Derek Anderson
- Occupation: businesswoman

Edna Viola Anderson (née Falkner; 9 November 1922 – 7 July 2019) was a Canadian politician who served as a Member of the House of Commons of Canada from 1988 to 1993.

The career businesswoman was elected in the 1988 federal election at the Simcoe Centre electoral district for the Progressive Conservative party. She served in the 34th Canadian Parliament. She did not seek another term in Parliament and ended her federal political career as of the 1993 federal election. Anderson died on 7 July 2019 at the age of 96.

She was the granddaughter of James Dew Chaplin.
