= Alex Nuttall =

Canadian politician

His Worship Alex Nuttall
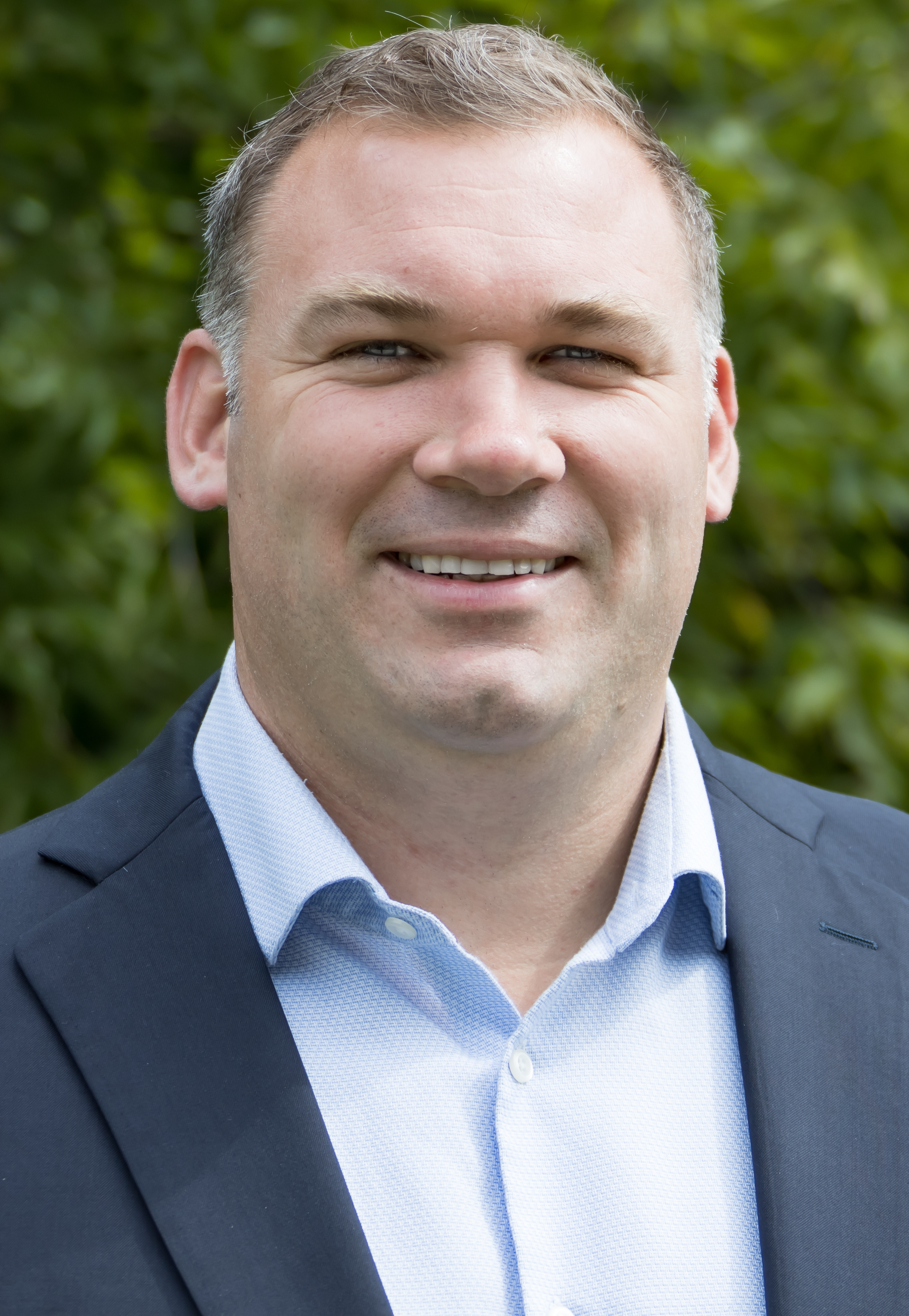
- Nuttall in Barrie, 2022

47th Mayor of Barrie
- Incumbent
- Assumed office November 15, 2022
- Deputy: Robert Thomson
- Preceded by: Jeff Lehman

Official Opposition Critic for Youth, Sport and Persons with Disabilities
- In office August 30, 2017 – September 11, 2019
- Leader: Andrew Scheer
- Preceded by: Rachael Harder

Member of Parliament for Barrie—Springwater—Oro-Medonte
- In office October 19, 2015 – September 11, 2019
- Preceded by: District established
- Succeeded by: Doug Shipley

Barrie City Councillor
- In office 2006–2014
- Preceded by: Tom Moore
- Succeeded by: Mike McCann
- Constituency: Ward 10

Personal details
- Born: Alexander Nuttall; August 10, 1985 (age 41) Liverpool, England, United Kingdom
- Party: Independent
- Other political affiliations: Conservative
- Children: 2
- Education: Political Science
- Alma mater: Laurentian University; Redeemer University
- Profession: Financial services
- Website: www.alexnuttall.ca

Alexander Nuttall (born August 10, 1985) is a Canadian politician who serves as the 47th and current mayor of Barrie. Previously, he served on Barrie City Council from 2006 until 2014, and as the member of Parliament for the federal electoral district of Barrie—Springwater—Oro-Medonte from 2015 to 2019, representing the Conservative Party. Nuttall won the 2022 Barrie municipal election.

== Early life and education ==
Nuttall was born on August 10, 1985 in Liverpool, England. He immigrated to Canada with his family in 1989, and grew up living in government-subsidized housing in Barrie, Ontario, with his mother and two older brothers after his parents divorced when he was eight.

He attended Allandale Heights Public School, was elected student mayor while attending St. Peter's Catholic Secondary School in 2002, and went on to graduate from Innisdale Secondary School in 2004. Nuttall majored in Political Science while studying at the private Christian Redeemer University and Laurentian University.

== Political career ==
=== Barrie City Council (2006–2014) ===
Nuttall served two terms as a city councillor on the Barrie City Council from 2006 until 2014. In 2006, Nuttall received 45.2% of the vote in Ward 10, and in 2010 he was re-elected with 82.7% of the vote.

During his time as a city councillor, Nuttall was employed in the financial services industry.

=== Provincial politics (2010) ===
In 2010, Nuttall sought the Progressive Conservative Party of Ontario nomination for Barrie in order to be the candidate for the 2011 Ontario general election.

On December 8, 2010 Barrie's PC riding association nominating committee requested that he step down as a candidate. The campaign was briefly put on hold pending an internal investigation by the Ontario PC Party to determine the validity of concerns regarding member recruitment methods. Nuttall's campaign was cleared to continue for the nomination meeting. The then-president of the Barrie riding association, Fred Hamelin, resigned from his role citing "personal ethics".

Nuttall lost the nomination to Rod Jackson who went on to win the riding in the general election.

=== Federal politics (2015–2019) ===
Nuttall served as a Member of Parliament in the House of Commons, representing Barrie—Springwater—Oro-Medonte from 2015 to 2019.

Following the 2015 federal election, Nuttall was appointed as the Official Opposition Critic for Economic Development for Southern Ontario on November 20, 2015. On April 8, 2016, Nuttall also accepted the role of Official Opposition Critic Deputy Critic for Innovation, Science and Economic Development, as well as Official Opposition Critic for the New Sharing Economy. On August 30, 2017, Nuttall was named Official Opposition Critic for Youth, Sports, and Persons with Disabilities.

During the first half of the 42nd Parliament, Nuttall served on the Standing Committee on Industry, Science and Technology. Beginning in Fall 2017, he became a member of the Standing Committee on Human Resources, Skills and Social Development and the Status of Persons with Disabilities.

Nuttall did not run for re-election in the 2019 federal election.

==== Reaction to Canada-wide opioid crisis ====
In 2018, MP Alex Nuttall called for a debate in the House of Commons to discuss the opioid emergency in Barrie, ON. Nuttall publicly supported the possibility of a declared public health emergency in Barrie to prevent further deaths due to the opioid crisis. On November 26, 2018, Nuttall released a 49-page report opposing Canada's plan to address the opioid crisis. The report outlined his strategy to combat the crisis by focusing on prevention alternatives.

== Mayor of Barrie (2022–) ==
In May 2022, Nuttall announced he was running for mayor of Barrie in the 2022 Barrie municipal election. Nuttall won the election against six other candidates, including Barrie Deputy Mayor Barry Ward and City Councillor Mike McCann. He officially became the 47th Mayor of Barrie on November 15, 2022. Prior to the election he was the Vice President of sales, marketing and customer service for the telecommunications company, North Frontenac Telephone Company (NFTC).

On November 21, 2022, Mayor Nuttall announced that Barrie Ward 5 councillor Robert Thomson was his choice to serve as the next Deputy Mayor of Barrie.

In November 2023, Nuttall appeared before the Ontario legislature's Standing Committee on Heritage, Infrastructure and Cultural Policy to argue for a proposal to expand Barrie's city boundaries by 2,200 hectares, taking land from the bordering Oro-Medonte and Springwater townships. Nuttall argued that this was necessary for to meet Barrie's economic and affordable housing goals. The same month, the councils of the two townships rebuffed discussions with Barrie. A January 2024 Mainstreet Research found that 73% of residents in Greater Barrie area supported the proposal.

In March 2024, Nuttall and federal housing minister Sean Fraser announced that Barrie would receive $25.6 million to help build 680 units over three years and approximately 4,000 homes over ten years as part of the Housing Accelerator Fund. The agreement was made possible after Barrie met requirements such as committing to allowing fourplexes as a matter of right, increasing the amount of city land available for affordable housing, and other changes.

In August 2024, Nuttall made the first use of new strong mayor powers granted in the Strong Mayors, Building Homes Act to pause development on a multi-purpose field project near the city's waterfront that was going to primarily house a Royal Canadian Sea Cadets parade ground and minor sports teams. After a commissioned report recommended that the space become a park, that the city review its use of existing sports facilities and a planned new performing arts centre.

In October 2024, Nuttall signed a letter, along with twelve other Ontario mayors, that called on Ontario Premier Doug Ford to invoke the notwithstanding clause to override the Section 7 Charter rights of Barrie residents living in homeless encampments. A January 2023 Ontario Superior Court of Justice decision had ruled that it was unconstitutional to enforce anti-encampment bylaws where there were an insufficient space in shelters to accommodate the affected. The letter also called on the provincial government to intervene in legal cases to apply the 2024 Supreme Court of the United States case City of Grants Pass v Johnson to prevent from ruling on municipal policies affecting homeless people, to strengthen involuntary commitment and involuntary treatment schemes, expanding drug diversion courts that focus on rehabilitation province-wide, and to strengthen trespass and open drug use.

On October 26 2026, Nuttall won the 2026 Simcoe County municipal election

== Community work ==
=== PIE Education ===
Nuttall co-founded the PIE Education program in 2010 with Barrie business owners Craig Russell and Angela Pidutti, owners of PIE Wood Fired Pizza Joint, as well as Adam Moulton, owner of Allandale Home Hardware.

To-date, the program has provided over 27,500 backpacks filled with school supplies for families living in government-subsidized homes and students in need across Ontario, including Barrie, Simcoe County, Muskoka, Ottawa, Sudbury and Toronto. In 2025 alone, the program distributed 8,600 backpacks.

=== Boots and Hearts Barn Burner charity hockey game ===
In 2018, Alex Nuttall became host and chair of the Boots and Hearts Barn Burner charity hockey game, formerly known as Hockey Night in Barrie. The Barn Burner brings celebrity hockey players, such as Toronto Maple Leaf Captain John Tavares, and local community members together to raise money for local charities. On August 3, 2022, the event, held at Sadlon Arena in Barrie, raised $155,000 for the RVH Foundation at Royal Victoria Regional Health Centre, Easter Seals Barrie, and PIE Education.

=== Lake Simcoe Region Conservation Authority ===
Nuttall served as a member of the Executive Board of Directors for the Lake Simcoe Region Conservation Authority from 2006 to 2010. During this time the Authority played a role in establishing the Lake Simcoe Protection Act, 2008.

== Personal life ==
While a federal MP, Nuttall employed the wife of another former Conservative MP Brian Storseth as an assistant. Nuttall broke his left navicular bone playing soccer in January 2023 and had surgeries in February 2023 and 2024 to deal with the injury and a subsequent infection.

== Electoral history ==
| 2022 Barrie Mayoral Candidate | Vote | % |
|---|---|---|
| Alex Nuttall | 13,401 | 42.72 |
| Barry Ward | 12,624 | 40.24 |
| Gerry Marshall | 2,745 | 8.75 |
| Mike McCann | 1,700 | 5.42 |
| Andrew Gordon | 449 | 1.43 |
| Weldon Hachey | 315 | 1.00 |
| Rob Haverson | 134 | 0.43 |

=== Federal ===
2015 Canadian federal election: Barrie—Springwater—Oro-Medonte
| Party | Candidate | Votes | % | ±% | Expenditures |
|---|---|---|---|---|---|
| Conservative | Alex Nuttall | 21,091 | 41.74 | −12.81 | $151,648.41 |
| Liberal | Brian Tamblyn | 21,005 | 41.57 | +24.63 | $101,563.29 |
| New Democratic | Ellen White | 5,202 | 10.29 | −9.73 | – |
| Green | Marty Lancaster | 2,648 | 5.24 | −0.85 | $30,596.20 |
| Libertarian | Darren Roskam | 401 | 0.79 | – | $1,353.95 |
| Independent | Ram Faerber | 188 | 0.37 | – | $10.93 |
| Total valid votes/expense limit | | 50,535 | 99.64 | | $207,773.31 |
| Total rejected ballots | | 181 | 0.36 | – | |
| Turnout | | 50,716 | 67.44 | – | |
| Eligible voters | | 75,207 | | | |
| Conservative hold | | Swing | | -18.72 | |
These results were subject to a judicial recount, and modified from the validated results in accordance with the Judge's rulings. The margin of Alex Nuttall over Brian Tamblyn decreased from 108 votes to 86 votes as a result of the recount.
Source: Elections Canada
