= Barrie South—Innisfil =

Federal electoral district in Ontario, Canada

Ontario electoral district
- Interactive map of riding boundaries (previously named Barrie—Innisfil) from the 2015 federal election
- Coordinates: 44.347639°N 79.664861°W; Location of the federal constituency office (as of 7 May 2016)

Federal electoral district
- Legislature: House of Commons
MP
John Brassard
Conservative
- District created: 2013
- First contested: 2015
- Last contested: 2025
- District webpage: profile, map

Demographics
- Population (2016): 109,286
- Electors (2021): 90,268
- Area (km²): 331.08
- Pop. density (per km²): 330.1
- Census division: Simcoe
- Census subdivision(s): Barrie (part), Innisfil

Barrie South—Innisfil (formerly Barrie—Innisfil; French: Barrie-Sud—Innisfil) is a federal electoral district in Ontario. It encompasses a portion of Ontario previously included in the electoral districts of Barrie and York—Simcoe.

== History ==
Barrie—Innisfil was created by the 2012 federal electoral boundaries redistribution and was legally defined in the 2013 representation order. It came into effect upon the call of the 2015 Canadian federal election on October 19, 2015. Following the 2022 Canadian federal electoral redistribution, this riding was renamed Barrie South—Innisfil.

=== Members of Parliament ===
This riding has elected the following members of Parliament:

Parliament	Years	Member	Party
Barrie—Innisfil; Riding created from Barrie and York—Simcoe
42nd	2015–2019	John Brassard	Conservative
43rd	2019–2021	John Brassard	Conservative
44th	2021–2025	John Brassard	Conservative
Barrie South—Innisfil
45th	2025–present	John Brassard	Conservative

== Geography ==
Barrie—Innisfil consists of the Town of Innisfil and part of the City of Barrie.

== Demographics ==
According to the 2021 Canadian census

Languages: 79.5% English, 2.0% Spanish, 1.8% Russian, 1.5% French, 1.4% Italian, 1.4% Portuguese
Religions: 55.4% Christian (26.6% Catholic, 4.6% Anglican, 4.6% United Church, 1.9% Christian Orthodox, 1.8% Presbyterian, 1.6% Pentecostal, 1.5% Baptist, 12.8% Other), 2.5% Muslim, 1.2% Hindu, 1.1% Jewish, 38.3% None
Median income: $42,800 (2020)
Average income: $54,200 (2020)

Panethnic groups in Barrie—Innisfil (2011−2021)
Panethnic group	2021		2016		2011	
Panethnic group	Pop.	%	Pop.	%	Pop.	%
European (Note: Statistic includes all persons that did not make up part of a visible minority or an indigenous identity.)	95,670	80.21%	93,935	86.76%	91,415	90.92%
African	4,655	3.9%	2,805	2.59%	1,955	1.94%
South Asian	4,090	3.43%	2,005	1.85%	1,165	1.16%
Indigenous	3,425	2.87%	3,175	2.93%	2,010	2%
Latin American	2,995	2.51%	1,565	1.45%	810	0.81%
East Asian (Note: Statistic includes total responses of "Chinese", "Korean", and "Japanese" under visible minority section on census.)	2,585	2.17%	1,710	1.58%	1,055	1.05%
Southeast Asian (Note: Statistic includes total responses of "Filipino" and "Southeast Asian" under visible minority section on census.)	2,410	2.02%	1,615	1.49%	1,045	1.04%
Middle Eastern (Note: Statistic includes total responses of "West Asian" and "Arab" under visible minority section on census.)	1,730	1.45%	585	0.54%	270	0.27%
Other/multiracial (Note: Statistic includes total responses of "Visible minority, n.i.e." and "Multiple visible minorities" under visible minority section on census.)	1,705	1.43%	870	0.8%	825	0.82%
Total responses	119,275	99.08%	108,265	99.07%	100,540	98.97%
Total population	120,378	100%	109,286	100%	101,584	100%
Notes: Totals greater than 100% due to multiple origin responses. Demographics based on 2012 Canadian federal electoral redistribution riding boundaries.

== Riding associations ==
Riding associations are the local branches of the national political parties:

Party	Association name	CEO	HQ city
Conservative Party of Canada	Barrie--Innisfil Conservative Electoral District Association	Sarah-Jane M. Taylor	Barrie
Green Party of Canada	Barrie South--Innisfil Green Party Association	Sandra P. Anderson	Caledon
Liberal Party of Canada	Barrie South--Innisfil Federal Liberal Association	Ryan Ward	Ottawa
New Democratic Party	Barrie South--Innisfil Federal NDP Riding Association	Pekka Reinio	Barrie

== Election results ==
Graph of election results in Barrie—Innisfil (minor parties that never got 2% of the vote or didn't run consistently are omitted)

2025 Canadian federal election
Party	Candidate	Votes	%	±%	Expenditures
Conservative	John Brassard	38,943	57.84	+10.17	
Liberal	John Olthuis	25,557	37.96	+9.07	
New Democratic	Andrew Harrigan	2,130	3.16	−12.61	
People's	Mark Sampson	695	1.03	−6.64	
Total valid votes/expense limit		67,325	99.36	+0.17	
Total rejected ballots		437	0.64	-0.17	
Turnout		67,762	68.35	+9.19	
Eligible voters		99,134			
Conservative hold		Swing		+0.55	
Source: Elections Canada
Note: number of eligible voters does not include voting day registrations.

2021 Canadian federal election: Barrie—Innisfil
Party	Candidate	Votes	%	±%	Expenditures
Conservative	John Brassard	25,234	47.67	+3.87	$85,518.18
Liberal	Lisa-Marie Wilson	15,292	28.89	-0.38	$20,446.18
New Democratic	Aleesha Gostkowski	8,349	15.77	-0.60	$7,141.50
People's	Corrado Brancato	4,060	7.67	+5.80	$5,417.54
Total valid votes		52,935	99.19	–	
Total rejected ballots		433	0.81	–	
Turnout		53,368	59.16	-3.62	
Eligible voters		90,212			
Conservative hold		Swing		+2.12	
Source: Elections Canada

2019 Canadian federal election: Barrie—Innisfil
Party	Candidate	Votes	%	±%	Expenditures
Conservative	John Brassard	23,765	43.80	-2.61	$67,066.96
Liberal	Lisa-Marie Wilson	15,879	29.27	-7.84	$25,221.89
New Democratic	Pekka Reinio	8,880	16.37	+4.59	$12,185.72
Green	Bonnie North	4,716	8.69	+4.66	$0.00
People's	Stephanie Robinson	1,013	1.87	–	none listed
Total valid votes/expense limit		54,253	99.31		
Total rejected ballots		376	0.69	+0.31	
Turnout		54,629	62.77	-1.28	
Eligible voters		87,025			
Conservative hold		Swing		-2.61	
Source: Elections Canada

2015 Canadian federal election: Barrie—Innisfil
Party	Candidate	Votes	%	±%	Expenditures
Conservative	John Brassard	22,901	46.41	−14.85	$152,037.98
Liberal	Colin Wilson	18,308	37.11	+24.59	$45,769.43
New Democratic	Myrna Clark	5,812	11.78	−8.49	$20,283.99
Green	Bonnie North	1,991	4.04	−1.28	$11,907.65
Christian Heritage	Gary Nail	199	0.40	–	$512.25
Canadian Action	Jeff Sakula	130	0.26	–	–
Total valid votes/expense limit		49,341	99.62		$209,977.36
Total rejected ballots		187	0.38	–	
Turnout		49,528	64.06	–	
Eligible voters		77,320			
Conservative hold		Swing		-19.72	
Source: Elections Canada

2011 federal election redistributed results
Party	Vote	%
Conservative	25,226	61.27
New Democratic	8,345	20.27
Liberal	5,154	12.52
Green	2,190	5.32
Others	258	0.63

== Student vote results ==
2025 Barrie South—Innisfil student vote
47.03%	27.44%	15.52%	10.01%
Conservative	Liberal	NDP	PPC

== See also ==
- List of Canadian electoral districts
- Historical federal electoral districts of Canada
