= Doug Shipley =

Canadian politician

Douglas Shipley MP

Member of Parliament for Barrie—Springwater—Oro-Medonte
- Incumbent
- Assumed office October 21, 2019
- Preceded by: Alex Nuttall

Personal details
- Born: June 10, 1966 (age 59)
- Party: Conservative
- Profession: Businessman, Politician

Doug Shipley MP (born June 10, 1966) is a Canadian politician who was elected to represent the riding of Barrie—Springwater—Oro-Medonte in the House of Commons of Canada in the 2019 Canadian federal election. He previously served on the Barrie City Council for Ward 3 from 2010–2019.

== Political career ==
=== Municipal politics ===
Shipley is a former city councillor for the Barrie City Council from 2010–2019. While serving as Councillor for Ward 3, Shipley served as Chair of Finance and Corporate Services, Chair of Infrastructure, Investment and Development Services Committee, and Deputy Chair of the Barrie Police Services Board. He also sat on several committees, including the Barrie and Area Physician Recruitment Task Force.

=== Federal Politics ===
Shipley was first elected to represent the riding of Barrie-Springwater-Oro-Medonte in the House of Commons in the 2019 Canadian federal election. Shipley was re-elected to represent the same riding at the 44th Canadian Parliament.

On September 12, 2022, Shipley was appointed Associate Shadow Minister for Public Safety by Conservative Party of Canada leader Pierre Poilievre. Shipley currently serves as the Vice Chair of the Standing Committee on Public Safety and National Security. Shipley has served on the Standing Committee on Public Safety and National Security since December 7, 2021.

Previously, Shipley also served on the Standing Committee on Transport, Infrastructure and Communities and was appointed Deputy Shadow Minister of Housing and Diversity and Inclusion by the previous Conservative Party of Canada leader Erin O'Toole.

== Electoral record ==
2025 Canadian federal election: Barrie—Springwater—Oro-Medonte
Party	Candidate	Votes	%	±%	Expenditures
Conservative	Doug Shipley	33,949	51.67	+5.88	
Liberal	Rose Zacharias	29,150	44.36	+13.95	
New Democratic	Gabriela Trujillo	1,559	2.37	−14.25	
Green	Greg Taylor	893	1.36	+1.15	
Communist	Michael Speers	158	0.24	N/A	
Total valid votes/expense limit		65,709	99.37		
Total rejected ballots		415	0.63		
Turnout		66,124	70.99		
Eligible voters		93,140			
Conservative notional hold		Swing		−4.04	
Source: Elections Canada
Note: number of eligible voters does not include voting day registrations.

2021 Canadian federal election: Barrie—Springwater—Oro-Medonte
Party	Candidate	Votes	%	±%
Conservative	Doug Shipley	23,555	45.09	+6.08
Liberal	Tanya Saari	16,145	30.91	-0.33
New Democratic	Sarah Lochhead	8,910	17.06	+2.24
People's	Chris Webb	3,629	6.95	+5.15
Total valid votes		52,239		
Total rejected ballots		480		
Turnout		52,719	63.43	-3.11
Eligible voters		82,843		
Source: Elections Canada
Conservative hold		Swing		+3.21

2019 Canadian federal election: Barrie—Springwater—Oro-Medonte
Party	Candidate	Votes	%	±%	Expenditures
Conservative	Doug Shipley	20,981	39.00	-2.57	$101,308.80
Liberal	Brian Kalliecharan	16,805	31.24	-10.36	$84,892.64
New Democratic	Dan Janssen	7,972	14.82	+4.50	$11,769.53
Green	Marty Lancaster	7,066	13.14	+7.88	none listed
People's	David Patterson	969	1.80	–	$3,100.42
Total valid votes/expense limit		53,793	99.30		
Total rejected ballots		378	0.70		
Turnout		54,171	66.54	-0.90	
Eligible voters		81,414			
Conservative hold		Swing		+3.92	
Source: Elections Canada

2018 Barrie municipal election: Ward 3
Candidate	Vote	%
Doug Shipley (X)	1,614	69.99
Tanya Saari	415	18.00
Lynne-Anne Hill	277	12.01
