= Doug Downey =

Canadian politician (born 1970)

The Honourable Doug Downey ECO KC MPP
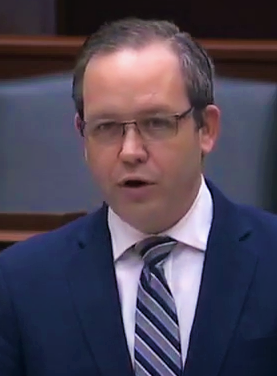
- Downey in 2020

Attorney General of Ontario
- Incumbent
- Assumed office June 20, 2019
- Premier: Doug Ford
- Preceded by: Caroline Mulroney

Member of the Ontario Provincial Parliament for Barrie—Springwater—Oro-Medonte
- Incumbent
- Assumed office June 7, 2018
- Preceded by: Riding established

Orillia City Councillor
- In office 2000–2006

Personal details
- Born: Douglas Richard Downey; February 2, 1970 (age 56)
- Party: Progressive Conservative
- Occupation: Lawyer
- Website: https://www.dougdowney.ca/

Douglas Richard Downey KC MPP (born February 2, 1970) is a Canadian politician who was elected to the Legislative Assembly of Ontario during the 2018 general election. He represents the riding of Barrie—Springwater—Oro-Medonte, and is a member of the Progressive Conservative Party of Ontario. Downey was named Parliamentary Assistant to Finance Minister Vic Fedeli shortly after the government was sworn in. He was appointed to the Standing Committee on Finance and Economic Affairs on July 26, 2018, vice-chair of the Select Committee on Financial Transparency on October 3, 2018; deputy government whip on November 5, 2018 and Attorney General on June 20, 2019.

== Background ==
Raised in Bond Head, Ontario, Downey received a bachelor's degree in political science from Wilfrid Laurier University, an M.A. specializing in judicial administration from Brock University, a law degree from Dalhousie University and a master of laws in municipal and development law through Osgoode Hall Law School. Downey practiced law as a certified specialist in real estate at nearby Orillia and served two terms on Orillia City Council. In 2007, he was appointed chair of the independent panel on the future of the Trent–Severn Waterway.

== Law-related background ==
In 1994, Downey was a court registrar with the Ontario Court General Division, now the Ontario Superior Court of Justice. Before that, he worked in family court administrations during the summers of 1992 and 1993. After attending law school at Dalhousie University, he articled with Crawford, McKenzie, McLean & Wilford at Orillia and was called to the bar in February 1999. He started his own law firm in 2001: Lewis, Downey, Tornosky & Lassaline, now Downey, Tornosky, Lassaline & Timpano Professional Corporation.

Downey has been very active in the Ontario Bar Association. He was elected secretary 2009-2010 and treasurer 2010-2014. He served on several committees and remained active up until his election as MPP in 2018. He was chair of communications for the Canadian Bar Association from 2013 to 2015. He attended the Uniform Law Conference of Canada and was part of a working group on commercial leasing until his election as an MPP in 2018.

He was a member of the Law Society of Ontario Certified Specialist Board and was active as a mentor and sat on several committees.

He was appointed by the provincial minister of government and consumer services as member of the panel on the regulation of home inspectors (2013); the provincial panel on business law reform (2015); and the Business Law Advisory Council (2016).

Downey also taught the law of contracts; property; torts; constitutional and Charter law for Laurentian University at Georgian College from 2005–2009.

== Municipal background ==
Downey was elected to the Orillia City Council in 2000. He was re-elected in 2003 and served until 2006. He was elected to the Ontario Small Urban Municipalities Board from 2003–2006. He served on several boards and commissions, including finance, Downtown Orillia Management Board, Stephen Leacock Museum and the Orillia Opera House.

He was a member of a joint municipal election compliance committee for New Tecumseth, Essa, Adjala–Tosorontio, Innisfil, and Bradford West Gwillimbury from 2010–2018.

== See also ==
- Protect Ontario Through Safer Streets and Stronger Communities Act

== Electoral history ==
2022 Ontario general election: Barrie—Springwater—Oro-Medonte
Party	Candidate	Votes	%	±%
Progressive Conservative	Doug Downey	16,631	42.10	−2.64
Liberal	Jeff Lehman	16,335	41.35	+27.76
New Democratic	Beverley Patchell	3,093	7.83	−20.38
Green	Elyse Robinson	1,699	4.30	−7.42
New Blue	Hayden Hughes	1,104	2.79	
Ontario Party	Gerry Auger	638	1.62	
Total valid votes		39,500	99.47	
Total rejected, unmarked, and declined ballots		210	0.53	-0.55
Turnout		39,710	46.75	-10.31
Eligible voters		84,950		
Progressive Conservative hold		Swing		−15.20
Source(s): "Data Explorer". Elections Ontario.
