= List of mayors of Barrie =

Mayor of Barrie
- Flag of Barrie

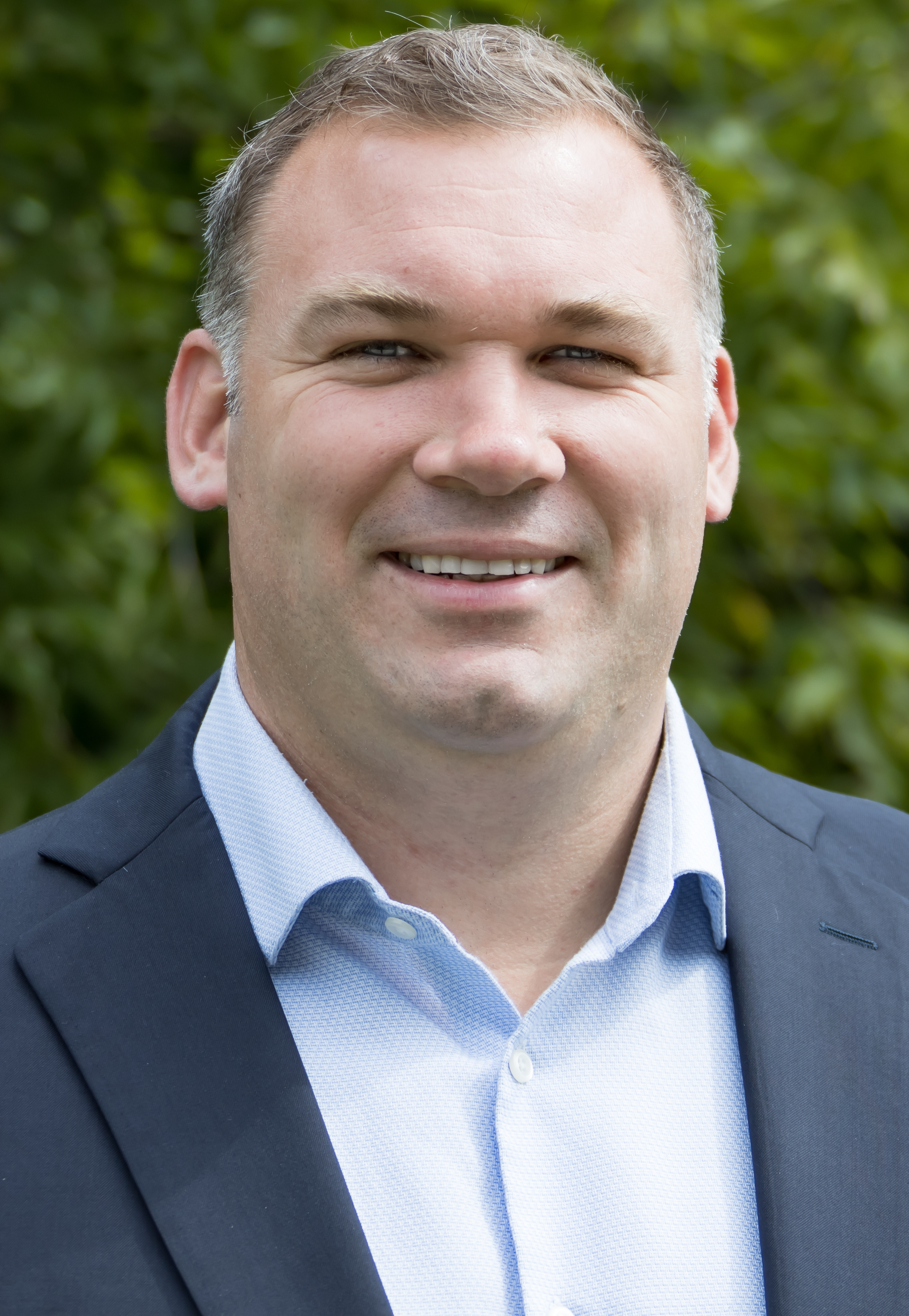
- Incumbent; Alex Nuttall since November 15, 2022
- Style: His Worship; Mayor (informal)
- Member of: Barrie City Council
- Reports to: Barrie City Council
- Residence: Barrie
- Seat: Barrie City Hall
- Appointer: Directly elected by residents of Barrie
- Term length: Four years, renewable
- Precursor: Reeve of Barrie
- Inaugural holder: Robert Simpson
- Formation: 1871; 155 years ago
- Deputy: Deputy mayor of Barrie
- Salary: CA$180,000 (2020)
- Website: Office of the Mayor

The mayor of Barrie is head of the governing body of the Barrie City Council. The current mayor is Alex Nuttall.

The following is a list of mayors and reeves of Barrie:

== Reeves (1854–1870) ==
- Jonathan Lane (1854–1855)
- Thomas David McConkey (1855–1856)
- David Morrow (1856–1857)
- Henry B. Hopkins (1857–1858)
- Robert Simpson (1858–1859)
- Thomas David McConkey (1859–1863)
- William Davis Ardagh (1864–1870)

== Mayors (1871–present) ==
- Robert Simpson (1871–1872)
- William Alves Boys (1873–1875)
- Robert Simpson (1876)
- W. D. Ardagh (1877–1881)
- Henry Sewery (1882–1886)
- C. H. Ross (1887–1888)
- F. E. P. Pepler (1889–1891)
- A. E. H. Creswicke (1892–1894)
- J. M. Bothwell (1895–1896)
- S. M. Wells (1897–1899)
- G. A. Radenhurst (1900–1901)
- William Alves Boys (1902–1904)
- Donald Ross (1905–1906)
- John H. Bennett (1907–1908)
- James Vair (1909)
- Thomas Beecroft (1910–1911)
- Alex Cowan (1912–1914)
- John F. Craig (1915–1917)
- Dr. Robert J. Sprott (1918–1920)
- John Little (1921–1923)
- John F. Craig (1924–1926)
- William Lowe (1927)
- Walter Duff (1927)
- Duncan Fletcher McCuaig (1928–1931)
- John F. Craig (1932–1934)
- W. J. Blair (1935)
- H. G. Robertson (1936–1941)
- Donald F. MacLaren (1942–1944)
- Peter Sinclair (1945–1946)
- Grant Mayor (1947–1949)
- Edwin Wilson (1950)
- Marjorie Hamilton (1950–1952)
- James W. Hart (1953)
- Heber Smith (1954)
- R. Eldon Greer (1955–1956)
- Willard Kinzie (1957–1961)
- Lester Cooke (1962–1967)
- Bob Bentley (1968–1969)
- Lester Cooke (1970–1972)
- Dorian Parker (1973–1976)
- Ross Archer (1977–1988)
- Janice Laking (1988–2000)
- Jim Perri (2000–2003)
- Robert J. Hamilton (2003–2006)
- Dave Aspden (2006–2010)
- Jeff Lehman (2010–2022)
- Alex Nuttall (2022–present)
