= Ed Harper =

Canadian politician

MP for Simcoe Centre
- In office 1993–1997
- Preceded by: Edna Anderson
- Succeeded by: riding dissolved

Personal details
- Born: April 9, 1931 (age 95) Toronto, Ontario, Canada
- Party: Reform
- Occupation: businessman

Edward Harper (born April 9, 1931) is a former Canadian politician, who represented the electoral district of Simcoe Centre in the House of Commons of Canada from 1993 until 1997. A member of the Reform Party, Harper was the only MP from that party ever elected anywhere east of Manitoba.

He defeated Liberal candidate Janice Laking, the incumbent mayor of Barrie, by a margin of 182 votes.

Harper did not stand for reelection in the 1997 election. Before being elected to Parliament, Harper was a businessman in Barrie.

== Electoral record ==
1993 Canadian federal election
Party	Candidate	Votes
Reform	Ed Harper	25,404
Liberal	Janice Laking	25,281
Progressive Conservative	Doug Jagges	11,647
New Democratic	Pat Peters	1,873
National	Craig Busch	1,342
Independent	Mike Ramsay	656
Christian Heritage	Ann Marie Tomlins	412
Natural Law	John Gregory	307
Independent	John K. Carson	139
Abolitionist	Gene Carter	41
