= John Brassard =

Canadian politician

John Brassard MP
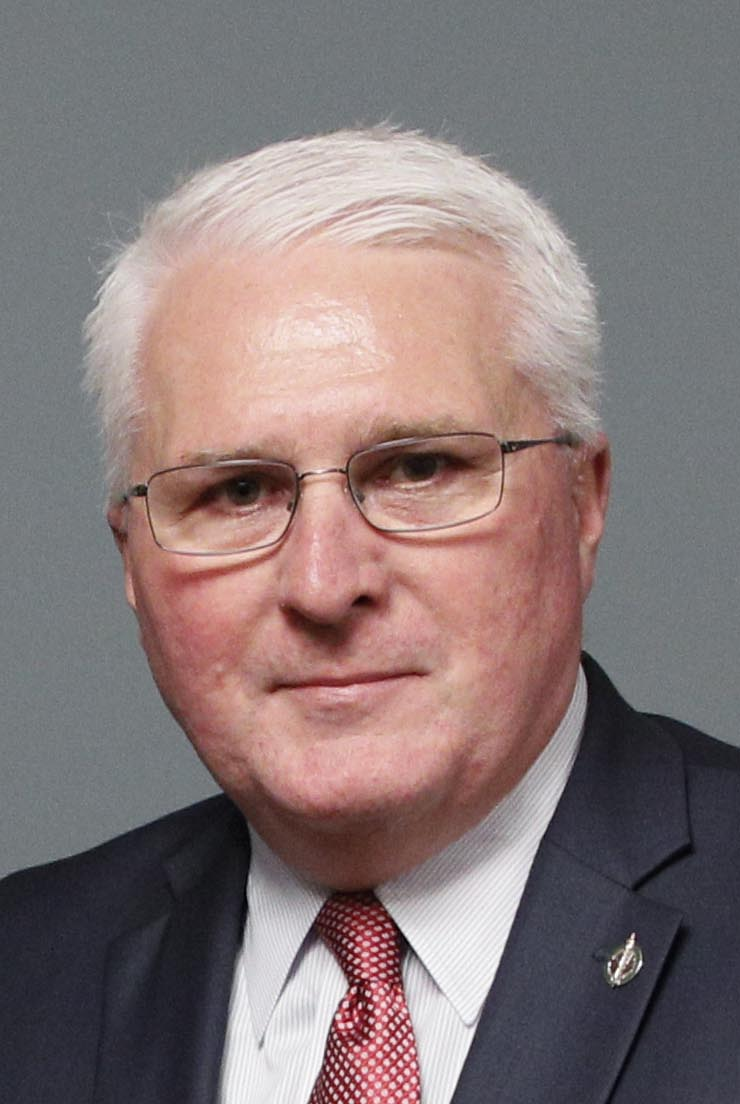
- Brassard in 2019

Deputy Opposition Whip
- In office August 29, 2017 – September 9, 2020
- Leader: Andrew Scheer; Erin O’Toole; Pierre Poilievre
- Preceded by: Dave MacKenzie
- Succeeded by: James Bezan

Opposition House Leader
- In office February 4, 2022 – September 12, 2022
- Leader: Candice Bergen
- Preceded by: Gérard Deltell
- Succeeded by: Andrew Scheer

Member of Parliament for Barrie—Innisfil
- Incumbent
- Assumed office October 19, 2015
- Preceded by: Riding established

Shadow Minister for Veterans Affairs
- In office October 16, 2016 – August 29, 2017
- Preceded by: Alupa Clarke
- Succeeded by: Steven Blaney

Barrie City Councillor
- In office November 13, 2006 – November 2, 2015
- Leader: Rona Ambrose; Andrew Scheer
- Preceded by: Steve Trotter
- Succeeded by: Andrew Prince

Personal details
- Born: May 11, 1964 (age 62) Montreal, Quebec, Canada
- Party: Conservative

John Brassard MP (born May 11, 1964) is a Canadian politician, who was elected to represent the riding of Barrie—Innisfil in the House of Commons of Canada in the 2015 Canadian federal election. Brassard is a former firefighter.

== Political career ==
=== Barrie City Council (to 2015) ===
Brassard is a former city councillor for the Barrie City Council.

=== Federal Member of Parliament (2015–present) ===
Brassard was re-elected to represent the same riding at the 43rd Canadian Parliament as well as the 44th Canadian Parliament.

Brassard occupied the position Deputy Whip of the Official Opposition in the 42nd and 43rd Commons, in addition to various Committee roles.

On February 5, 2022, he was appointed Opposition House Leader by new interim Leader of the Conservative Party Candice Bergen.

He was elected as the chair of the Canadian House of Commons Standing Committee on Access to Information, Privacy and Ethics in the 45th Canadian Parliament.

== Electoral record ==
2025 Canadian federal election: Barrie South—Innisfil
Party	Candidate	Votes	%	±%	Expenditures
Conservative	John Brassard	38,943	57.84	+10.17	
Liberal	John Olthuis	25,557	37.96	+9.07	
New Democratic	Andrew Harrigan	2,130	3.16	−12.61	
People's	Mark Sampson	695	1.03	−6.64	
Total valid votes/expense limit		67,325	99.36	+0.17	
Total rejected ballots		437	0.64	-0.17	
Turnout		67,762	68.35	+9.19	
Eligible voters		99,134			
Conservative hold		Swing		+0.55	
Source: Elections Canada
Note: number of eligible voters does not include voting day registrations.

2021 Canadian federal election: Barrie—Innisfil
Party	Candidate	Votes	%	±%	Expenditures
Conservative	John Brassard	25,234	47.67	+3.87	$85,518.18
Liberal	Lisa-Marie Wilson	15,292	28.89	-0.38	$20,446.18
New Democratic	Aleesha Gostkowski	8,349	15.77	-0.60	$7,141.50
People's	Corrado Brancato	4,060	7.67	+5.80	$5,417.54
Total valid votes		52,935	99.19	–	
Total rejected ballots		433	0.81	–	
Turnout		53,368	59.16	-3.62	
Eligible voters		90,212			
Conservative hold		Swing		+2.12	
Source: Elections Canada

2019 Canadian federal election: Barrie—Innisfil
Party	Candidate	Votes	%	±%	Expenditures
Conservative	John Brassard	23,765	43.80	-2.61	$67,066.96
Liberal	Lisa-Marie Wilson	15,879	29.27	-7.84	$25,221.89
New Democratic	Pekka Reinio	8,880	16.37	+4.59	$12,185.72
Green	Bonnie North	4,716	8.69	+4.66	$0.00
People's	Stephanie Robinson	1,013	1.87	–	none listed
Total valid votes/expense limit		54,253	99.31		
Total rejected ballots		376	0.69	+0.31	
Turnout		54,629	62.77	-1.28	
Eligible voters		87,025			
Conservative hold		Swing		-2.61	
Source: Elections Canada

2015 Canadian federal election: Barrie—Innisfil
Party	Candidate	Votes	%	±%	Expenditures
Conservative	John Brassard	22,901	46.41	−14.85	$152,037.98
Liberal	Colin Wilson	18,308	37.11	+24.59	$45,769.43
New Democratic	Myrna Clark	5,812	11.78	−8.49	$20,283.99
Green	Bonnie North	1,991	4.04	−1.28	$11,907.65
Christian Heritage	Gary Nail	199	0.40	–	$512.25
Canadian Action	Jeff Sakula	130	0.26	–	–
Total valid votes/expense limit		49,341	99.62		$209,977.36
Total rejected ballots		187	0.38	–	
Turnout		49,528	64.06	–	
Eligible voters		77,320			
Conservative hold		Swing		-19.72	
Source: Elections Canada
