= Robert J. Hamilton =

Canadian politician

Rob Hamilton

44th Mayor of Barrie
- In office December 1, 2003 – December 4, 2006
- Preceded by: Jim Perri
- Succeeded by: Dave Aspden

Robert J. Hamilton is a Canadian politician and former mayor of Barrie, Ontario.

== Political career ==
Hamilton was elected in November 2003, defeating incumbent Jim Perri. Prior to entering municipal politics, he ran for the House of Commons of Canada as a candidate of the Canadian Alliance in the 2000 federal election.

Hamilton's focus as mayor was economic development, with a specific objective of attracting higher paying jobs to the city as an alternative for the city's many commuters (local residents who travel daily to Toronto, Ontario for higher-paying jobs). His most notable success in this regard was the decision by the Bank of Montreal to relocate its Canadian Operations Centre to Barrie.

Hamilton also reached out to the film and television production industry, and Barrie was selected as the location for the ongoing production of YTV's Monster Warriors television program. Hamilton made a brief cameo appearance in the program's debut episode.

Hamilton was defeated by Dave Aspden in the 2006 municipal election, and was succeeded by Aspden in early December.

In 2009, Hamilton decided to run for a new term as mayor of Barrie with hopes of succeeding Mayor Dave Aspden. Barrie city councilor Jeff Lehman was elected instead on October 25, 2010, with Hamilton receiving 14% of the votes.
