= Thomas David McConkey =

Canadian politician

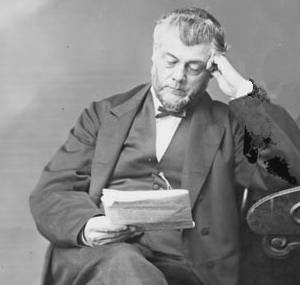
- Source: Library and Archives Canada

Personal details
- Born: July 29, 1815 Artrea, County Tyrone, Ireland
- Died: February 21, 1890 (aged 74) Barrie, Ontario, Canada
- Party: Liberal Party of Canada
- Spouse: Mary Ross (m. 1844)
- Children: 4 (Benjamin, Thomas, Anne, Charles)
- Parent: Sarah Porter (1779-1871, mother) Squire Thomas McConkey (1780-1862, father)
- Occupation: Reeve of Barrie

Thomas David McConkey (July 29, 1815 – February 21, 1890) was an Ontario businessman and political figure. He represented Simcoe North in the House of Commons of Canada as a Liberal member from 1867 to 1872.

He was born in County Tyrone, Ireland in 1815, the son of Thomas McConkey, and came to Innisfil Township in Upper Canada with his family in 1828. McConkey was a merchant in Barrie. He served as reeve there and was warden for Simcoe County from 1860 to 1861. McConkey was an unsuccessful candidate for the Legislative Assembly of the Province of Canada in 1861. He was elected to that assembly for the North riding of Simcoe in 1863 and served until Confederation; he was re-elected in 1867. From 1875 until his death, he served as sheriff for Simcoe County in Barrie.
