= Simcoe Centre (federal electoral district) =

Former federal electoral district in Ontario, Canada

Ontario electoral district

Defunct federal electoral district
- Legislature: House of Commons
- District created: 1987
- District abolished: 1996
- First contested: 1988
- Last contested: 1993

Simcoe Centre was a federal electoral district in Ontario, Canada, that was represented in the House of Commons of Canada from 1988 to 1997. This riding was created in 1987 from parts of Grey—Simcoe, Simcoe South and Wellington—Dufferin—Simcoe ridings.

Simcoe Centre consisted of the City of Barrie, the towns of Alliston and Wasaga Beach, the Village of Cookstown and the townships of Essa, Innisfille, Sunnidale, Tosorontio and Vespra.

The electoral district was abolished in 1996 when it was redistributed into Barrie—Simcoe—Bradford and Simcoe—Grey ridings.

Simcoe Centre is the only riding east of Manitoba to have ever elected a Reform Party Member of Parliament, in the 1993 federal election, Ed Harper, who won a narrow victory over the Liberal candidate. Simcoe Centre was also the only one of Ontario's 98 seats to not go to the Liberals in the 1993 federal election.

== Members of Parliament ==
This riding has elected the following members of Parliament:

| Parliament | Years | Member | Party |
|---|---|---|---|
Riding created from Simcoe South, Grey—Simcoe and Wellington—Dufferin—Simcoe
| 34th | 1988–1993 | Edna Anderson | Progressive Conservative |
| 35th | 1993–1997 | Ed Harper | Reform |
Riding dissolved into Barrie—Simcoe—Bradford and Simcoe—Grey

== Election results ==
1988 Canadian federal election
| Party | Candidate | Votes | % |
|---|---|---|---|
| Progressive Conservative | Edna Anderson | 23,504 | 45.37 |
| Liberal | Jack Ramsay | 17,233 | 33.27 |
| New Democratic | Judy Watson | 8,380 | 16.18 |
| Christian Heritage | Ethel Snow | 2,252 | 4.35 |
| Confederation of Regions | B.J. Ainsworth | 433 | 0.84 |

1993 Canadian federal election
| Party | Candidate | Votes | % | ±% |
|---|---|---|---|---|
| Reform | Ed Harper | 25,404 | 37.86 | – |
| Liberal | Janice Laking | 25,281 | 37.68 | +4.41 |
| Progressive Conservative | Doug Jagges | 11,647 | 17.36 | –28.01 |
| New Democratic | Pat Peters | 1,873 | 2.79 | –13.39 |
| National | Craig Busch | 1,342 | 2.00 | – |
| Independent | Mike Ramsay | 656 | 0.98 | – |
| Christian Heritage | Ann Marie Tomlins | 412 | 0.61 | –3.74 |
| Natural Law | John Gregory | 307 | 0.46 | – |
| Independent | John K. Carson | 139 | 0.21 | – |
| Abolitionist | Gene Carter | 41 | 0.06 | – |

== See also ==
- List of Canadian electoral districts
- Historical federal electoral districts of Canada
