= Barrie City Council =

Barrie City Council is the governing body for the City of Barrie, in Ontario, Canada.

The council consists of the Mayor of Barrie and ten councillors, who represent the ten wards of the city. The council posts agendas for council meetings.

There are four city departments: the Chief Administrators Office, the Community Operations Division, the Corporate Services Division, and the Infrastructure, Development & Culture Division.

== 2003–2006 Council ==
Councillor	Ward	Notes
Rob Hamilton	Mayor	2003–2006
Adam Smith	1	2003–2006
Dave Aspden	2	See above
Patrick Brown	3	replaced by Alison Eadie after he became MP for Barrie.
Barry Ward	4	See above
Lynn Strachan	5	See above
Michael Prowse	6	See above
Steve Trotter	7	2003–2006
Jerry Moore	8	See above
Kevin LePage	9	2003–2006
Tom Moore	10	2003–2006

== 2006–2010 Council ==
The city of Barrie had an election along with many other Ontario communities, including Toronto, on 13 November 2006.

Councillor	Ward	Notes
Dave Aspden	Mayor	2003–2006 – Ward 2 Councillor; 2006 – Elected Mayor
Mike Ramsay	1	1993 – Ran as Independent MP Candidate for Simcoe Centre and was defeated. 1994–2003 - Councillor; 2003 – Ran as Liberal MPP candidate for Barrie—Simcoe—Bradford and was defeated. 2006 - Elected Ward 1 Councillor
Jeff Lehman	2	See above
Rodney Jackson	3	2006–2010 – Ward 3 Councillor
Barry Ward	4	See above
Lynn Strachan	5	See above
Michael Prowse	6	See above
John Brassard	7	See above
Jerry Moore	8	2003–2010 – Ward 8 Councillor
Andrew Prince	9	2006–2010 – Ward 9 Councillor
Alex Nuttall	10	See above

== 2010–2014 Council ==
The city of Barrie had an election along with many other Ontario communities, including Toronto, on October 25, 2010.

Councillor	Ward	Notes
Jeff Lehman	Mayor	2006–2010 Ward 2 Councillor; 2010 – Elected Mayor
Bonnie Ainsworth	1	2010–2018
Lynn Strachan	2	2010–2014
Doug Shipley	3	2010–2019
Barry Ward	4	2003–2022
Peter Silveira	5	2010–2018
Michael Prowse	6	2003–2016
John Brassard	7	2006–2015
Jennifer Robinson; Arif Khan	8	2010–2012 (resigned August 2012); 2012–2018
Brian Jackson	9	2010–2014
Alex Nuttall	10	2006–2014

== 2014–2018 Council ==
Councillor	Ward	First elected	Communities
Jeff Lehman	Mayor	2006 (Councillor); 2010 (Mayor)	At-large
Bonnie Ainsworth	1	1997	Georgian Drive, Grove East, Codrington, North Shore
Rose Romita	2	2014	Wellington, Queen's, City Centre, Lakeshore
Doug Shipley	3	2010	Little Lake, East Bayfield
Barry Ward	4	2000	Sunnidale, West Bayfield, Northwest
Peter Silveira	5	2010	Letitia Heights, Sandy Hollow, Edgehill Drive
Michael Prowse (until 2016) Steve Trotter	6	2003 (resigned to become City of Barrie CAO) 2017 (appointed) 1994 (elected)	Ardagh
John Brassard (until 2015); Andrew Prince (after 2016)	7	2006; 2016	Holly
Arif Khan	8	2012	Allandale, South Shore, Painswick North
Sergio Morales	9	2014	Painswick South
Mike McCann	10	2014	Innishore, Bayshore

== 2018–2022 Council ==
Councillor	Ward	First elected	Communities
Jeff Lehman	Mayor	2006 (Councillor); 2010 (Mayor)	At-large
Clare Riepma	1	2018	Georgian Drive, Grove East, Codrington, North Shore
Keenan Aylwin	2	2018	Queen's Park, Downtown, West Village, Brock Park, The Grove
Doug Shipley (until 2019); Ann-Marie Kungl (after 2020)	3	2010; 2020	Little Lake, East Bayfield
Barry Ward	4	2000 (Councillor); 2018–2022 (Deputy Mayor)	Sunnidale, West Bayfield, Northwest
Robert Thomson	5	2018	Letitia Heights, Sandy Hollow, Edgehill Drive
Natalie Harris	6	2018	Ardagh
Gary Harvey	7	2018	Holly
Jim Harris	8	2018	Allandale, South Shore, Painswick North
Sergio Morales	9	2014	Painswick South
Mike McCann	10	2014	Innishore, Bayshore

== 2022–2026 Council ==
Councillor	Ward	First elected	Communities
Alex Nuttall	Mayor	2006–2014 (Ward 10 Councillor); 2015–2019 (MP for Barrie–Springwater–Oro-Medonte)	At-large
Clare Riepma	1	2018	Georgian Drive, Grove East, Codrington, North Shore
Craig Nixon	2	2022	Queen's Park, Downtown, West Village, Brock Park, The Grove
Ann-Marie Kungl	3	2020	Little Lake, East Bayfield
Amy Courser	4	2022	Sunnidale, West Bayfield, Northwest
Robert Thomson	5	2018 (Councillor); 2022–present (Deputy Mayor)	Letitia Heights, Sandy Hollow, Edgehill Drive
Nigussie Nigussie	6	2022	Ardagh
Gary Harvey	7	2018	Holly
Jim Harris	8	2018	Allandale, South Shore, Painswick North
Sergio Morales	9	2014	Painswick South
Bryn Hamilton	10	2022	Innishore, Bayshore
