= Barrie—Springwater—Oro-Medonte (federal electoral district) =

Federal electoral district in Ontario, Canada

Coordinates: 44.52°N 79.75°W

Ontario electoral district
- Interactive map of riding boundaries from the 2025 federal election

Federal electoral district
- Legislature: House of Commons
MP
Doug Shipley
Conservative
- District created: 2013
- First contested: 2015
- Last contested: 2025
- District webpage: profile, map

Demographics
- Population (2016): 100,788
- Electors (2015): 74,783
- Area (km²): 966.10
- Pop. density (per km²): 104.3
- Census division: Simcoe
- Census subdivision(s): Barrie (part), Oro-Medonte, Springwater

Barrie—Springwater—Oro-Medonte is a federal electoral district in Ontario. It encompasses a portion of Ontario previously included in the electoral districts of Barrie, Simcoe—Grey and Simcoe North.

== History ==
Barrie—Springwater—Oro-Medonte was created by the 2012 federal electoral boundaries redistribution and was legally defined in the 2013 representation order. It came into effect upon the call of the 2015 Canadian federal election, held on 19 October 2015.

Following the 2022 Canadian federal electoral redistribution, it gained the remainder of Oro-Medonte from Simcoe North.

=== Members of Parliament ===
This riding has elected the following members of Parliament:

Parliament	Years	Member	Party
Barrie—Springwater—Oro-Medonte; Riding created from Barrie, Simcoe—Grey, and Simcoe North
42nd	2015–2019	Alex Nuttall	Conservative
43rd	2019–2021	Doug Shipley	Conservative
44th	2021–2025	Doug Shipley	Conservative
45th	2025–present	Doug Shipley	Conservative

== Recount ==
On Monday October 26, 2015, a judge granted the Liberal Party's request for a judicial recount after a 'significant number of rejected and spoiled ballots' were argued may not have been handled properly.

== Demographics ==
According to the 2021 Canadian census

Languages: 85.4% English, 1.7% French, 1.0% Spanish
Religions: 52.1% Christian (21.2% Catholic, 6.6% United Church, 5.6% Anglican, 2.3% Presbyterian, 1.7% Baptist, 1.2% Christian Orthodox, 1.0% Pentecostal, 12.5% Other), 1.6% Muslim, 1.3% Hindu, 42.6% None
Median income: $41,600 (2020)
Average income: $54,950 (2020)

Panethnic groups in Barrie—Springwater—Oro-Medonte (2011−2021)
Panethnic group	2021		2016		2011	
Panethnic group	Pop.	%	Pop.	%	Pop.	%
European (Note: Statistic includes all persons that did not make up part of a visible minority or an indigenous identity.)	88,290	84.02%	88,395	89.13%	88,795	92.06%
Indigenous	4,150	3.95%	4,075	4.11%	2,755	2.86%
South Asian	3,855	3.67%	1,560	1.57%	760	0.79%
African	2,710	2.58%	1,685	1.7%	940	0.97%
East Asian (Note: Statistic includes total responses of "Chinese", "Korean", and "Japanese" under visible minority section on census.)	1,685	1.6%	1,340	1.35%	1,255	1.3%
Southeast Asian (Note: Statistic includes total responses of "Filipino" and "Southeast Asian" under visible minority section on census.)	1,530	1.46%	685	0.69%	650	0.67%
Latin American	1,160	1.1%	495	0.5%	600	0.62%
Middle Eastern (Note: Statistic includes total responses of "West Asian" and "Arab" under visible minority section on census.)	945	0.9%	465	0.47%	265	0.27%
Other/multiracial (Note: Statistic includes total responses of "Visible minority, n.i.e." and "Multiple visible minorities" under visible minority section on census.)	750	0.71%	480	0.48%	420	0.44%
Total responses	105,080	98.32%	99,180	98.4%	96,450	98.54%
Total population	106,871	100%	100,788	100%	97,876	100%
Notes: Totals greater than 100% due to multiple origin responses. Demographics based on 2012 Canadian federal electoral redistribution riding boundaries.

== Riding associations ==
Riding associations are the local branches of the national political parties:

Party	Association name	CEO'	HQ city
Conservative	Barrie--Springwater--Oro-Medonte Conservative Association	Shawn Scott	Oro-Medonte
Green	Barrie--Springwater--Oro-Medonte Green Party Association	Eric P. Loewen	Barrie
Liberal	Barrie--Springwater--Oro-Medonte Federal Liberal Association	Tanya S. Saari	Barrie
New Democratic	Barrie--Springwater--Oro-Medonte Federal NDP Riding Association	Brandon R. Amyot	Barrie

== Election results ==
Graph of election results in Barrie—Springwater—Oro-Mendote (minor parties that never got 2% of the vote or didn't run consistently are omitted)

2025 Canadian federal election
Party	Candidate	Votes	%	±%	Expenditures
Conservative	Doug Shipley	33,949	51.67	+5.88	
Liberal	Rose Zacharias	29,150	44.36	+13.95	
New Democratic	Gabriela Trujillo	1,559	2.37	−14.25	
Green	Greg Taylor	893	1.36	+1.15	
Communist	Michael Speers	158	0.24	N/A	
Total valid votes/expense limit		65,709	99.37		
Total rejected ballots		415	0.63		
Turnout		66,124	70.99		
Eligible voters		93,140			
Conservative notional hold		Swing		−4.04	
Source: Elections Canada
Note: number of eligible voters does not include voting day registrations.

2021 federal election redistributed results
Party	Vote	%
Conservative	26,317	45.79
Liberal	17,481	30.41
New Democratic	9,552	16.62
People's	3,985	6.93
Green	123	0.21
Christian Heritage	18	0.03
Total valid votes	57,476	99.15
Rejected ballots	494	0.85
Registered voters/ estimated turnout	90,142	64.31

2021 Canadian federal election
Party	Candidate	Votes	%	±%	Expenditures
Conservative	Doug Shipley	23,555	45.09	+6.08	$110,912.41
Liberal	Tanya Saari	16,145	30.91	-0.33	$58,262.91
New Democratic	Sarah Lochhead	8,910	17.06	+2.24	$1,879.94
People's	Chris Webb	3,629	6.95	+5.15	$6,804.55
Total valid votes		52,239			
Total rejected ballots		480			
Turnout		52,719	63.43	-3.11	
Eligible voters		82,843			
Conservative hold		Swing		+3.21	
Source: Elections Canada

2019 Canadian federal election
Party	Candidate	Votes	%	±%	Expenditures
Conservative	Doug Shipley	20,981	39.00	-2.57	$101,308.80
Liberal	Brian Kalliecharan	16,805	31.24	-10.36	$84,892.64
New Democratic	Dan Janssen	7,972	14.82	+4.50	$11,769.53
Green	Marty Lancaster	7,066	13.14	+7.88	none listed
People's	David Patterson	969	1.80	–	$3,100.42
Total valid votes/expense limit		53,793	99.30		
Total rejected ballots		378	0.70		
Turnout		54,171	66.54	-0.90	
Eligible voters		81,414			
Conservative hold		Swing		+3.92	
Source: Elections Canada

2015 Canadian federal election
Party	Candidate	Votes	%	±%	Expenditures
Conservative	Alex Nuttall	21,091	41.74	−12.81	$151,648.41
Liberal	Brian Tamblyn	21,005	41.57	+24.63	$101,563.29
New Democratic	Ellen White	5,202	10.29	−9.73	–
Green	Marty Lancaster	2,648	5.24	−0.85	$30,596.20
Libertarian	Darren Roskam	401	0.79	–	$1,353.95
Independent	Ram Faerber	188	0.37	–	$10.93
Total valid votes/expense limit		50,535	99.64		$207,773.31
Total rejected ballots		181	0.36	–	
Turnout		50,716	67.44	–	
Eligible voters		75,207			
Conservative hold		Swing		-18.72	
These results were subject to a judicial recount, and modified from the validated results in accordance with the Judge's rulings. The margin of Alex Nuttall over Brian Tamblyn decreased from 108 votes to 86 votes as a result of the recount.
Source: Elections Canada

2011 federal election redistributed results
Party	Vote	%
Conservative	24,476	54.44
New Democratic	8,983	20.02
Liberal	7,599	16.94
Green	2,732	6.09
Others	1,080	2.41

== See also ==
- List of Canadian electoral districts
- Historical federal electoral districts of Canada
