= Barrie—Springwater—Oro-Medonte (provincial electoral district) =

Provincial electoral district in Ontario, Canada

Coordinates: 44.52°N 79.75°W

Ontario electoral district
- Barrie—Springwater—Oro-Medonte in relation to nearby electoral districts

Provincial electoral district
- Legislature: Legislative Assembly of Ontario
MPP
Doug Downey
Progressive Conservative
- District created: 2015
- First contested: 2018
- Last contested: 2025

Demographics
- Population (2016): 100,785
- Electors (2018): 80,951
- Area (km²): 1,018
- Pop. density (per km²): 99
- Census division: Simcoe
- Census subdivision(s): Barrie, Oro-Medonte, Springwater

Barrie—Springwater—Oro-Medonte is a provincial electoral district in Ontario, Canada. It elects one member to the Legislative Assembly of Ontario. The riding was created in 2015, and was first contested in the 2018 General Election.

== Members of Provincial Parliament ==
Barrie—Springwater—Oro-Medonte
Assembly	Years	Member	Party
Riding created from Barrie, Simcoe—Grey, and Simcoe North
42nd	2018–2022	Doug Downey	Progressive Conservative
43rd	2022–2025	Doug Downey	Progressive Conservative
44th	2025–present	Doug Downey	Progressive Conservative

== Election results ==
Winning party in each polling division of Barrie—Springwater—Oro-Medonte at the 2025 Ontario general election

2025 Ontario general election
Party	Candidate	Votes	%	±%
Progressive Conservative	Doug Downey	20,073	49.88	+7.77
Liberal	Rose Zacharias	14,332	35.61	–5.74
New Democratic	Tracey Lapham	2,710	6.73	–1.10
Green	Tim Grant	1,637	4.07	–0.23
New Blue	Alex Della Ventura	856	2.13	–0.67
Libertarian	Erin Patterson	637	1.58	–
Total valid votes		40,245	99.32	
Total rejected, unmarked and declined ballots		276	0.68	+0.15
Turnout		40,521	45.90	–0.84
Eligible voters		88,277		
Progressive Conservative hold		Swing		▲6.76
Source: Elections Ontario

Winning party in each polling division of Barrie—Springwater—Oro-Medonte at the 2022 Ontario general election

2022 Ontario general election
Party	Candidate	Votes	%	±%
Progressive Conservative	Doug Downey	16,631	42.10	–2.64
Liberal	Jeff Lehman	16,335	41.35	+27.76
New Democratic	Beverley Patchell	3,093	7.83	–20.38
Green	Elyse Robinson	1,699	4.30	–7.42
New Blue	Hayden Hughes	1,104	2.79	–
Ontario Party	Gerry Auger	638	1.62	–
Total valid votes		39,500	99.47	
Total rejected, unmarked and declined ballots		210	0.53	–0.55
Turnout		39,710	46.75	–10.31
Eligible voters		84,950		
Progressive Conservative hold		Swing		▼15.20
Source: Elections Ontario

2018 Ontario general election
Party	Candidate	Votes	%
Progressive Conservative	Doug Downey	20,445	44.75
New Democratic	Dan Janssen	12,891	28.21
Liberal	Jeff Kerk	6,210	13.59
Green	Keenan Aylwin	5,354	11.72
Libertarian	Mark Mitchell	280	0.61
None of the Above	Darren Roskam	174	0.38
Independent	Michael Tuck	172	0.38
Independent	Ram Faerber	163	0.36
Total valid votes		45,689	98.92
Total rejected, unmarked and declined ballots		497	1.08
Turnout		46,186	57.05
Eligible voters		80,951	
Progressive Conservative pickup new district.			
Source: Elections Ontario

2014 general election redistributed results
Party	Vote	%
Liberal	15,093	39.26
Progressive Conservative	14,803	38.51
New Democratic	5,755	14.97
Green	2,601	6.77
Others	188	0.49

== See also ==
- List of Ontario provincial electoral districts
- Canadian provincial electoral districts
