= Jeff Lehman (politician) =

46th mayor of Barrie

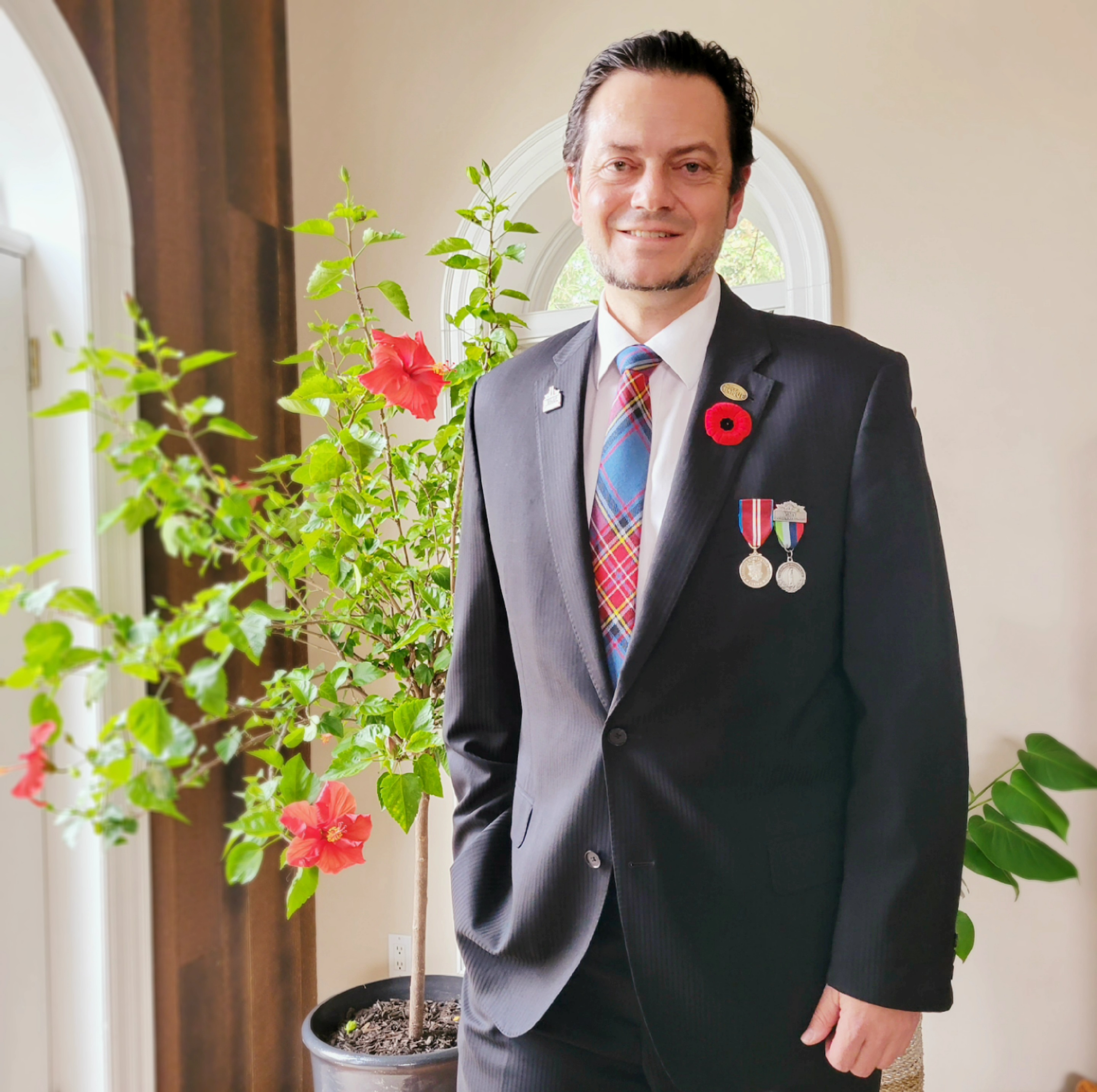
- Lehman in November 2021

Chair of the District of Muskoka
- Incumbent
- Assumed office December 5, 2022
- Preceded by: John Klinck

46th Mayor of Barrie
- In office 6 December 2010 – November 15, 2022
- Deputy: Barry Ward
- Preceded by: Dave Aspden
- Succeeded by: Alex Nuttall

Barrie City Councillor for Ward 2
- In office November 2006 – 6 December 2010
- Preceded by: David Aspden
- Succeeded by: Lynn Strachan
- Constituency: Ward 2

Personal details
- Born: Jeffrey Robert Lehman; 7 June 1975 (age 50) Toronto, Ontario, Canada
- Party: Independent
- Other political affiliations: Ontario Liberal
- Domestic partner: Carolina Belmares
- Children: 1
- Profession: Politician; economist

Jeffrey Robert Lehman (born 7 June 1975) is a Canadian politician and economist who is currently serving as Chair of the District of Muskoka since 2022. He had previously served as the 46th mayor of Barrie from 2010 to 2022. He was also the chair of Ontario's Big City Mayor's organization, consisting of the mayors of Ontario's 29 largest cities.

Lehman began his career as an academic, teaching urban and housing economics at the UK's prestigious London School of Economics. He had a ten-year career as an economist and built a consulting firm, MKI, in Ottawa and Toronto, before entering politics. Lehman represented Barrie's Ward 2 as a city councillor from 2006 to 2010 before being elected mayor in October 2010. He defeated the incumbent in a race that included several more established local politicians. From 2014 to 2017 and since 2021, Lehman has served as chair of Ontario's Big City Mayors.

Lehman holds a Chartered Director (C.Dir) designation and has served on the boards of directors of several organizations over his career in public service, including the Board of the Association of Municipalities of Ontario. In 2017, Lehman teamed up with the mayors of Mississauga, Hamilton, Markham, Vaughan, and St. Catharines to support the "mega-merger" of electricity companies in those cities to create Alectra, the second largest community-owned utility in North America; Lehman is a founding director of the company.

== Early life and education ==
Lehman was born in Toronto, before moving to Barrie in 1978. He attended Allandale Heights Public School, and Barrie Central Collegiate Institute. He holds a bachelor's degree from Queen's University, and a master's degree from the London School of Economics (LSE), graduating with first class honours. Lehman joined the faculty of the new Cities Programme at the LSE in 1998, and worked for 3 years in London as an academic before returning to Canada in late 1999.

His parents, Bob and Joan Lehman, founded Lehman & Associates, a land use planning firm, in 1979; Jeff worked in this family business while he was growing up. Bob is a Fellow of the Canadian Institute of Planners and has worked as a consulting planner, focusing initially on public policy work in Ontario, ultimately working across the country. Joan was CFO of the family business before taking on a series of community building projects, including serving as the chair of the Building Committees for both the MacLaren Art Centre and Gilda's Club, a cancer support charity facility.

== Business career ==
Lehman worked for cities across the country to manage redevelopment and plan investment in their urban infrastructure. He worked with the city of Ottawa on projects that included a new district library, expansions to two community centres, and a plan to reduce corporate real estate costs following the amalgamation of the City of Ottawa with surrounding municipalities.

In 2002, Lehman co-founded MKI, a small economics advisory firm. The firm specialized in public infrastructure primarily for large cities, specifically transportation projects and public buildings. Lehman's work included planning new transit systems in Waterloo, Ottawa and Toronto, and planning for industrial expansion and economic development in Regina, Calgary, Hamilton, Niagara, and Burlington. MKI was acquired by the predecessor firm to WSP.

== City council ==
In 2005, Lehman established the Growing By Degrees task force to expand post-secondary education opportunities for students in Barrie. Lehman was elected to Barrie City Council in the municipal election in November 2006, representing Ward 2, the city centre. Lehman won the election with 49.98% of the vote, falling just one vote short of an absolute majority.

As a councillor, Lehman was the Chairman of the Finance Committee of Council in 2007 and served as the chair of the city's Growth Management Working Group in 2008. At the time Barrie, the Town of Innisfil, and County of Simcoe were battling over contrasting visions for how the area should grow. At the heart of the dispute was whether additional jobs and population should be focused in Barrie, or dispersed among the 16 municipalities in Simcoe County. Barrie argued growth should occur in cities with urban services and in June 2009, the Government of Ontario stepped in and resolved the dispute, annexing additional lands for growth to Barrie and the lion's share of the additional jobs.

In 2008, Lehman created the Historic Neighbourhoods Strategy, a plan for the older neighbourhoods in Barrie, generally those built before World War II. The strategy was innovative, as it focused on specific neighbourhoods, instead of considering services citywide, and because it was citizen-led. The project was co-ordinated by a committee of 16 volunteers from the 7 historic neighbourhoods and was approved by City Council in June 2010.

Lehman played a prominent role in the ultimately unsuccessful battle to save two schools in his ward, Prince of Wales PS, and Barrie Central Collegiate, including starting a Facebook group called "Save Barrie Central", which attracted 3,000 members in its first week. Lehman also worked on issues related to small business in Barrie, including eliminating the basic business license fee.

== Mayor of Barrie ==
In February 2010, Lehman announced that he would be a candidate for mayor of Barrie in the October 2010 elections.

The race included the incumbent mayor, a former mayor, a former MPP, another city councillor, and several additional candidates. Lehman's campaign was the first in Barrie to use social media in a manner that is now more typical of elections in larger urban centres. Lehman won the election on 25 October 2010, with 39% of the popular vote. He was sworn in as the 46th mayor of Barrie in December 2010.

During his first term in office, major new office/industrial campuses were developed in Barrie by IBM, TD Bank, Cogeco, Napoleon, and others. Barrie led all metropolitan areas east of Alberta in the rate of job creation from 2010 to 2014. Lehman launched a series of service reviews to modernize city services, and the City made the high-profile hirings of Carla Ladd as CAO of the City of Barrie in 2011 and Kimberley Greenwood as Chief of Police in 2013.

Lehman drove a major overhaul and expansion of the city's transit system, launched in 2013. Initially beset by route and scheduling problems, the plan later helped deliver a dramatic increase in transit ridership, particularly after Georgian College and the City signed a student pass agreement a few years later.

The city built a number of new public facilities during this time, including its first branch public library, a performing arts centre, the Allandale Waterfront GO Station, and the Military Heritage Park. Lehman's leadership resulted in annual tax increases declining from an average of 3.9% in the previous decade to 2.7% over the 2010 to 2020 period.

In October 2014, Lehman was re-elected for a second term, winning by a large margin with 92.3% of the popular vote.

In 2014 and 2015, Barrie had the lowest crime index of any Canadian metropolitan areas. Lehman's second term was again characterized by economic expansion, further reduction in crime, and the construction of more public facilities, together with a further shifting growth patterns from suburban to more urban redevelopment. The city completed a major new public square in the city's historic downtown, Meridian Place, which includes an outdoor performing arts stage and in the adjacent Memorial Square, an expanded cenotaph in recognition the city's strong military history and relationship with Base Borden.

As residential rents in the city started to rise, Lehman championed an Affordable Housing Strategy adopted by City Council in early 2015. However, the city has continued to experience a housing crisis, due in part to a lack of purpose-built rental development since the 1980s.

In October 2018, Lehman was re-elected for a third term, winning 91% of the popular vote. Lehman's focus has been on housing, economic development, public space, and improving the city's fiscal condition. Lehman has played a prominent public role during the COVID-19 crisis by supporting public health measures with frequent video updates through his social media channels and in civic initiatives. He has also advocated for small business supports and changes to public health restrictions, most notably being one of several Ontario Mayors who pushed back when the Ford Government ordered playgrounds closed in April 2021.

On 15 July 2021, an F2 tornado struck south end neighbourhoods in the City of Barrie, damaging hundreds of homes and businesses. Lehman provided video updates from the impacted area following in the aftermath of the damage. As chair of Ontario's Big City Mayor's caucus, Lehman has advocated for the needs of large municipalities on issues affecting Ontario's cities, including advocating for decriminalization of simple possession of opioids, and the use of federal and provincial economic policies to address the housing crisis.

Lehman ran for the Ontario Liberal Party in the 2022 Ontario general election in the riding of Barrie—Springwater—Oro-Medonte. Though he ultimately fell short of winning, he managed to turn what had been a stronghold for the PCs into the closest race of the election. After the election, he said “To come that close with such a devastating result for the Liberal party across the province is an incredible win for everyone in this room”.

== Honours and recognition ==
Lehman has received a number of awards during his time as mayor. In 2017, he was awarded the Gil Bennett Award by the Conference Board of Canada's Director's College, for excellence in corporate governance education. He was also named the 2017 Community Leader Influencer of the Year by the Economic Developers Council of Ontario. In 2019, U.S. business magazine Fast Company named Lehman number 26 in its top 100 Most Creative People in Business for his innovative solutions in government.

== Personal life ==
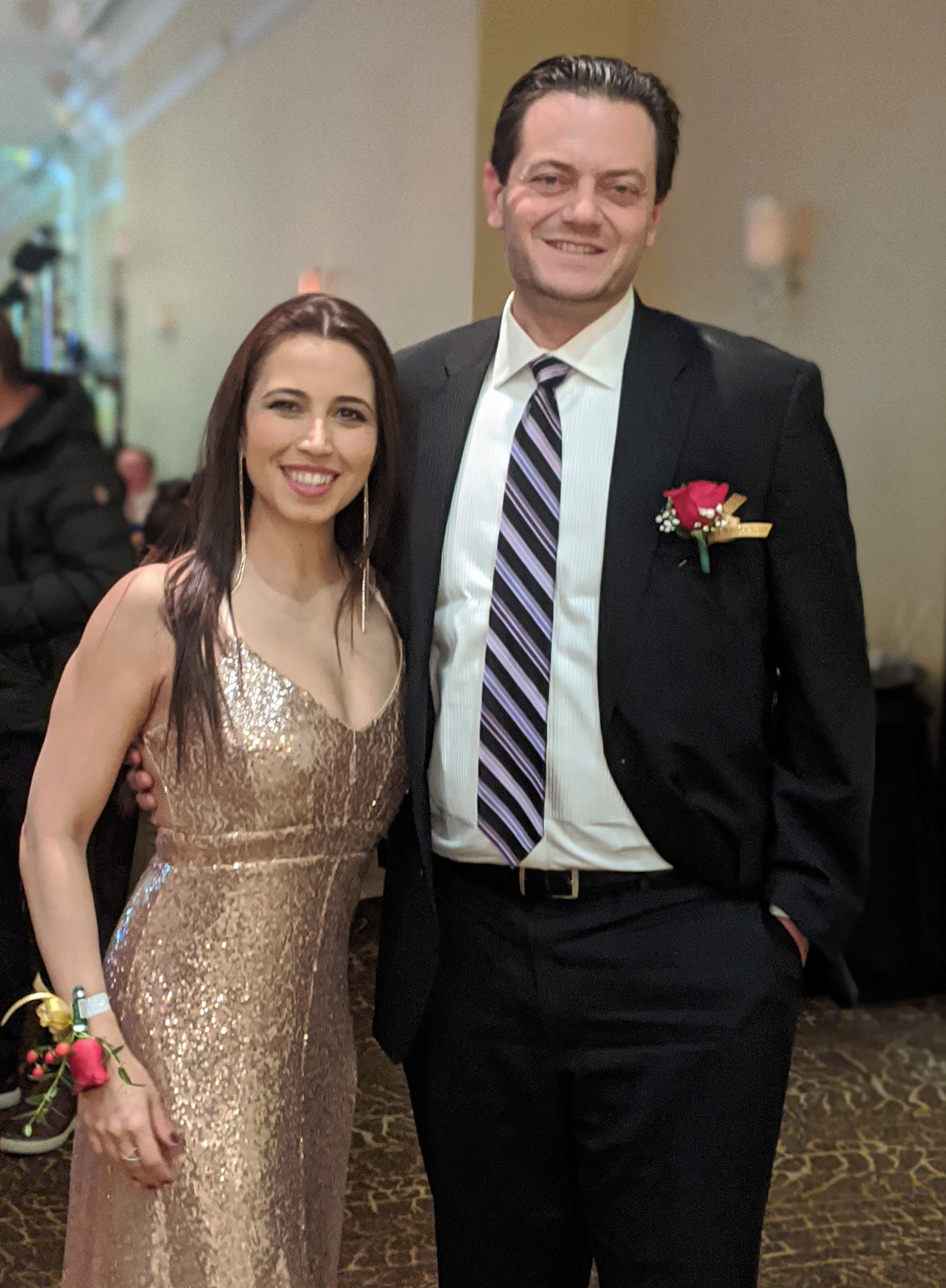
Jeff Lehman and Carolina Belmares

Lehman lives with partner Carolina Belmares, a fitness and nutrition coach, writer, and speaker. Their blended family includes their four children and twenty-pound cat, Churro. The couple have been prominent supporters of local causes, including Belmares' work to support new Canadians and ethnocultural communities in the Simcoe County area.
