= List of shipwrecks in 1955 =

The list of shipwrecks in 1955 includes ships sunk, foundered, grounded, or otherwise lost during 1955.

table of contents
1955
Jan	Feb	Mar	Apr
May	Jun	Jul	Aug
Sep	Oct	Nov	Dec
Unknown date

== January ==
=== 1 January ===
List of shipwrecks: 1 January 1955
Ship	State	Description
Bungsberg	West Germany	The cargo ship collided with the Liberty ship Voikov (Soviet Union) in the Kiel Canal and was severely damaged. She was kept afloat with the assistance of three tugs.

=== 2 January ===
List of shipwrecks: 2 January 1955
Ship	State	Description
Rosafred	Sweden	The cargo ship ran aground off Stockholm. All 22 crew rescued by K A Wallenberg (Sweden).

=== 7 January ===
List of shipwrecks: 7 January 1955
Ship	State	Description
Lanarkbrook	United Kingdom	The coaster collided with Artesien (France) in the Seine. Lanarkbrook was holed and was beached to prevent her sinking.

=== 10 January ===
List of shipwrecks: 10 January 1955
Ship	State	Description
ROCS Chung Kuan	Republic of China Navy	Chinese Civil War: The Chung Hai-class tank landing ship was bombed and sunk by People's Republic of China Ilyushin Il-10 and Tupolev Tu-2 aircraft.
ROCS Dong Ting	Republic of China Navy	Chinese Civil War: The Qing Jiang-class submarine chaser was torpedoed and sunk off Quemoy by No. 102 ( (China) People's Liberation Army Navy).

=== 13 January ===
List of shipwrecks: 13 January 1955
Ship	State	Description
Gatt	Norway	The cargo ship ran aground at Hook of Holland, Netherlands. Crew of 22 rescued by a Koninklijke Marine helicopter or a line from the shore.

=== 15 January ===
List of shipwrecks: 15 January 1955
Ship	State	Description
Sudbury Hill	United Kingdom	The cargo ship ran aground off Bermuda but was refloated undamaged.

=== 16 January ===
List of shipwrecks: 16 January 1955
Ship	State	Description
Centauro	Italy	The cargo ship was blown from her moorings at Hamilton, Bermuda and ran aground on a reef. Refloated on 17 January.

=== 17 January ===
List of shipwrecks: 17 January 1955
Ship	State	Description
Gerda Maersk (or Gerd Mærsk)	Denmark	The tanker ran aground on Scharhörn, in the mouth of the Elbe, West Germany Gerd Mærsk, loaded with crude oil, leaked on the Scharhörn reef during a heavy snowstorm at hurricane force, while on a voyage to Hamburg. During the rescue operation, it was decided to pump part of the cargo overboard to keep the ship from breaking apart, releasing about 7000-8000 tons of crude oil. In the meantime, the oil slick covered an area of 1600 square kilometers and reached the islands of Amrum, Föhr, Sylt, Rømø and Fanø despite considerable attempts to combat it. As far away as Esbjerg, the spills drew widespread bird deaths.

=== 18 January ===
List of shipwrecks: 18 January 1955
Ship	State	Description
Greta Thordén	Finland	The cargo ship collided with Olympic Brook (Greece) off Brunsbüttel, West Germany.
Markhor	United Kingdom	The cargo ship ran aground in the Weser at Blexenreede, West Germany.
Theta Star	United Kingdom	The cargo ship ran aground on Terschelling, Netherlands.

=== 20 January ===
List of shipwrecks: 20 January 1955
Ship	State	Description
Edendale	Crown Colony of Singapore	Chinese Civil War: The cargo ship was sunk in an air raid at Swatow, China. All 52 crew survived.
ROCS Yin Jiang	Republic of China Navy	Chinese Civil War: Battle of the Yijiangsan Islands: The Qing Jiang-class submarine chaser was torpedoed and sunk off the Yijiangsan Islands by No. 159 ( (China) People's Liberation Army Navy).

=== 21 January ===
List of shipwrecks: 21 January 1955
Ship	State	Description
Roskva	Norway	The cargo ship ran aground off Burial Island, County Down, Northern Ireland.
Mando	Panama	The Liberty ship ran aground off Round Island, Isles of Scilly, United Kingdom. All 26 crew rescued by the St. Mary's lifeboat. She was on a voyage from the Hampton Roads, Virginia, United States to IJmuiden, North Holland, Netherlands. She was a total loss.

=== 22 January ===
List of shipwrecks: 22 January 1955
Ship	State	Description
Kingsbridge	United Kingdom	The cargo ship ran aground off Christchurch, Dorset.

=== 23 January ===
List of shipwrecks: 23 January 1955
Ship	State	Description
Syros	Greece	The tanker ran aground off Bermuda after her anchor chains broke in a gale.

=== 24 January ===
List of shipwrecks: 24 January 1955
Ship	State	Description
Bobara	United Kingdom	The Liberty ship ran aground at Rhosneigr, Anglesey. She was on a voyage from a port in New Brunswick, Canada to Manchester, Lancashire.

=== 25 January ===
List of shipwrecks: 25 January 1955
Ship	State	Description
Albertville	Belgium	The cargo ship ran aground in the Scheldt.
Bullaren	Sweden	The cargo ship ran aground in the Scheldt, Belgium.

== February ==
=== 4 February ===
List of shipwrecks: 4 February 1955
Ship	State	Description
HMS Wrangler	Royal Navy	The W-class destroyer ran aground at Villefranche sur Mer, France. Refloated on 6 February by French Navy and Italian Navy tugs.

=== 11 February ===
List of shipwrecks: 11 February 1955
Ship	State	Description
Bristol City	United Kingdom	The cargo ship collided with the Victory ship President Harding (United States) off New York, United States and was severely damaged. City of Bristol was on a voyage from Boston, Massachusetts, United States to New York.

=== 12 February ===
List of shipwrecks: 12 February 1955
Ship	State	Description
Thorncombe	United Kingdom	The Design 381 Coastal Freighter was wrecked near Diêm Điền.

=== 14 February ===
List of shipwrecks: 14 February 1955
Ship	State	Description
Hoheweg	West Germany	The cargo ship collided with Sunny Prince and sank in the English Channel off Dungeness, Kent. All fifteen crew rescued by Sunny Prince and landed at Dover.

=== 19 February ===
List of shipwrecks: 19 February 1955
Ship	State	Description
Camas Meadows	United States	The T2 tanker capsized and sank at Genoa, Italy in a storm. She was declared a constructive total loss and consequently scrapped.
Nordanland	Sweden	The refrigerated cargo ship was driven against the quayside, sprang a leak and capsized at Genoa in a storm. She caught fire and exploded when her cargo of calcium carbide got wet.

=== 20 February ===
List of shipwrecks: 20 February 1955
Ship	State	Description
Mormacfir	United States	The Victory ship was severely damaged when she collided with a swing bridge at Aalborg, Denmark.

=== 21 February ===
List of shipwrecks: 21 February 1955
Ship	State	Description
Monviso	Italy	Ran aground at Hope Point, St. Margaret's Bay, Kent. Refloated by tugs and returned to service.
Nordanland	Sweden	The cargo ship exploded and sank when her cargo of calcium carbide reacted with seawater and formed acetylene after the ship was badly damaged in a storm at Genoa, Italy the previous day.

=== 22 February ===
List of shipwrecks: 22 February 1955
Ship	State	Description
Meta D	United States	The Liberty ship ran aground 3 nautical miles (5.6 km) off Selsey Bill, Sussex, United Kingdom. Refloated on 25 February and towed into Southampton, Hampshire.

== March ==
=== 2 March ===
List of shipwrecks: 2 March 1955
Ship	State	Description
Inchkeith	Hong Kong	The cargo ship struck an uncharted rock in the Bay of Bengal off Port Meadows, Andaman Islands and was abandoned as a total loss.

=== 8 March ===
List of shipwrecks: 8 March 1965
Ship	State	Description
Sue	United States	The 19-gross register ton, 36.3-foot (11.1 m) fishing vessel was wrecked in Phoenix Bay (58°11′N 152°15′W) inside of Perenosa Bay (58.4307°N 152.4173°W) on the coast of Kodiak Island.

=== 14 March ===
List of shipwrecks: 14 March 1955
Ship	State	Description
Iason	Greece	The fishing vessel capsized and sank in the Ionian Sea with the loss of eleven of her fifteen crew. Stratheden (United Kingdom) sent one of her lifeboats to the aid of Iason, but it capsized and all eight on board were drowned. Four survivors from Iason were rescued by Stratheden.

=== 20 March ===
List of shipwrecks: 20 March 1955
Ship	State	Description
British Craftsman	United Kingdom	The tanker ran aground off Stockholm, Sweden.

=== 23 March ===
List of shipwrecks: 23 March 1955
Ship	State	Description
Anna Henny	Netherlands	The coaster was driven ashore at Aberavon, Glamorganshire in a storm. Refloated after five hours.
Venus	Norway	The ocean liner ran aground at Plymouth, Devon, United Kingdom.

=== 24 March ===
List of shipwrecks: 24 March 1955
Ship	State	Description
Urola	Spain	The cargo ship collided with Storaya Pyaltylotka (Soviet Union) off Setubal, Portugal and sank. Storaya Pyaltylotka was badly damaged, entering the Tagus still taking on water. All 33 crew from Urola were rescued.

=== 25 March ===
List of shipwrecks: 25 March 1955
Ship	State	Description
Lea	Netherlands	The coaster ran aground at Kettleness, Yorkshire.

=== 28 March ===
List of shipwrecks: 28 March 1955
Ship	State	Description
Harvester	United States	The 20-gross register ton 39.9-foot (12.2 m) fishing vessel was destroyed by fire in Sumner Strait in Southeast Alaska at the north end of Level Island (56°28′N 133°05′W) in the Alexander Archipelago.

=== 29 March ===
List of shipwrecks: 29 March 1955
Ship	State	Description
Nigelock	United Kingdom	The coaster ran aground at Foochow, China.

=== Unknown March ===
List of shipwrecks: 29 March 1955
Ship	State	Description
Playmates	United Kingdom	The 86.3-foot (26.3 m) steam trawler last reported 22 March 40-50 West northwest of Seven Stones Lightship, not heard from again.

== April ==
=== 18 April ===
List of shipwrecks: 18 April 1955
Ship	State	Description
Georgios Matsas	Greece	Ran aground off Muros, Spain and subsequently sank. Raised on 17 June, but declared a constructive total loss. Repaired and sold, served a further ten years before being scrapped.

=== 22 April ===
List of shipwrecks: 22 April 1955
Ship	State	Description
William Burnett	United States	The 28-gross register ton, 48.6-foot (14.8 m) motor vessel was destroyed by fire at Koffman Cove in Southeast Alaska.

=== 24 April ===
List of shipwrecks: 24 April 1955
Ship	State	Description
Empire Fowey	United Kingdom	The troopship ran aground in the Suez Canal, Egypt. Refloated after twelve hours.

=== 26 April ===
List of shipwrecks: 26 April 1955
Ship	State	Description
Belgion	Greece	The cargo ship was in collision with Tai Shan (Norway) in the Scheldt at Fort Paarel, Belgium. Belgion capsized and sank with the loss of five of her 27 crew.
Germania	Greece	The cargo ship collided with Maro (Panama) in the English Channel and was beached off Beachy Head, Sussex. Although declared a constructive total loss, she was sold, repaired and returned to service as Auriga.

== May ==
=== 6 May ===
List of shipwrecks: 6 May 1955
Ship	State	Description
Pyidawtha	Burma	The steamship ran aground and was wrecked in the Bay of Bengal off Cheduba Island.

=== 7 May ===
List of shipwrecks: 7 May 1955
Ship	State	Description
Pafco No. 7	United States	The 15-gross register ton, 33.1-foot (10.1 m) fishing vessel sank in the Gulf of Alaska off Cape Saint Elias on the southwestern end of Kayak Island on the southcentral coast of the Territory of Alaska.

=== 9 May ===
List of shipwrecks: 9 May 1955
Ship	State	Description
Eagle	United States	The 30-gross register ton, 50.3-foot (15.3 m) fishing vessel was wrecked at Yakutat, Territory of Alaska.

=== 10 May ===
List of shipwrecks: 10 May 1955
Ship	State	Description
Unknown	Republic of China Navy	A small military vessel reportedly exploded at Kaohsiung, Taiwan killing 49.

=== 11 May ===
List of shipwrecks: 11 May 1955
Ship	State	Description
Shiun Maru	Japan	Shiun Maru. The train ferry collided with Japanese National Railways ferry Uko Maru (Japan) and sank with the loss of 168 lives.

=== 18 May ===
List of shipwrecks: 18 May 1955
Ship	State	Description
Urmajo	Netherlands	The coaster ran aground on the Goodwin Sands, Kent, United Kingdom. All ten crew rescued by the Ramsgate lifeboat. They were later returned to the ship which refloated on the next tide. Urmajo was towed into Ramsgate by the tug Ocean Cock (United Kingdom).
Zor	Turkey	The cargo ship developed a heavy list in the North Sea off Norfolk. Ten crew were rescued by the collier Richmond Queen (United Kingdom) and transferred to the Wells lifeboat. Richmond Queen and two other ships stood by as it was not possible to rescue all crew on board.

=== 22 May ===
List of shipwrecks: 22 May 1955
Ship	State	Description
Zor	Turkey	The cargo ship capsized and sank between the Humber and The Wash. She rose to the surface in a capsized state on 23 May.

=== 23 May ===
List of shipwrecks: 23 May 1955
Ship	State	Description
Hacienda	United States	The 11-gross register ton 32.1-foot (9.8 m) fishing vessel was destroyed by fire in Behm Canal in the Alexander Archipelago in Southeast Alaska.

=== 24 May ===
List of shipwrecks: 24 May 1955
Ship	State	Description
Empire Trooper	United Kingdom	The troopship ran aground on a sankbank off the coast of Fife. She was being towed from Southampton, Hampshire to Inverkeithing, Fife for scrapping. She was refloated four weeks later and completed her voyage.

=== 29 May ===
List of shipwrecks: 22 May 1955
Ship	State	Description
Goolgwai	Australia	The sold off Castle-class naval trawler was wrecked on rocks at Boora Point, Malabar, New South Wales, Australia, in thick fog. She broke up on 6 June.

=== 30 May ===
List of shipwrecks: 30 May 1955
Ship	State	Description
Harfry	United Kingdom	The collier collided with Firmity (United Kingdom) off Great Yarmouth, Norfolk. Both ships were holed. Harfry was beached at Hemsby and Firmity put into Great Yarmouth.
HMS Northumbria	(United Kingdom) Royal Naval Volunteer Reserve	The Ton-class minesweeper was in collision with Cyprian Prince (Cyprus) off Newcastle upon Tyne and was holed. Cyprian Prince towed her into Newcastle upon Tyne.

=== Unknown date ===
List of shipwrecks: Unknown date in May 1955
Ship	State	Description
Stalingrad	Soviet Union	The incomplete Stalingrad-class battlecruiser was driven ashore in Sevastopol Bay. She was refloated in 1956.

== June ==
=== 6 June ===
List of shipwrecks: 6 June 1955
Ship	State	Description
Pokucie	Poland	The trawler, a former Mersey-class trawler, sank at the coaling dock, Silesia Wharf, Gdynia, Poland after coaling due to a defective valve. Salvaged, declared beyond economic repair, and scrapped.

=== 8 June ===
List of shipwrecks: 8 June 1955
Ship	State	Description
Ferranti	United Kingdom	The flatiron collier collided on the River Thames with the United States Lines freighter American Jurist (United States) off Stoneness Point, West Thurrock, England, and put ashore, sinking. Ferranti was broken up in 1956.
"Ludo"	United Kingdom	The trawler was sunk in a collision with Mona's Isle (United Kingdom) off Fleetwood, Lancashire. Her Captain died, 2 crew swam to shore.
Mary Ann	United States	The 7-gross register ton, 29.4-foot (9.0 m) fishing vessel was destroyed by fire in Kendrick Bay (54°51′15″N 131°58′00″W) on the coast of Prince of Wales Island in the Alexander Archipelago in Southeast Alaska.
Mona's Isle	United Kingdom	The ferry collided with trawler "Ludo" (United Kingdom) and ran aground at Fleetwood, Lancashire while maneuvering to rescue survivors. She was later refloated.

=== 9 June ===
List of shipwrecks: 9 June 1955
Ship	State	Description
Johannishus	Sweden	Collided with Buccaneer (Panama) and caught fire. Ship a total loss, cargo of oil largely salvaged.

=== 10 June ===
List of shipwrecks: 10 June 1955
Ship	State	Description
Morzhovoi	United States	The 81-gross register ton, 80.2-foot (24.4 m) motor cargo vessel was destroyed by fire in Funter Bay in the Alexander Archipelago in Southeast Alaska.

=== 16 June ===
List of shipwrecks: 16 June 1955
Ship	State	Description
HMS Sidon	Royal Navy	The S-class submarine sank in Portland Harbour, England, following an on-board torpedo explosion. Thirteen lives were lost. Later refloated and sunk in 1957 in deeper water.

=== 26 June ===
List of shipwrecks: 26 June 1955
Ship	State	Description
Larsen Bay No. 7	United States	The 49-gross register ton, 59.9-foot (18.3 m) scow was wrecked at East Anchor Cove (54°41′30″N 163°04′00″W) near False Pass, Territory of Alaska.

== July ==
=== 8 July ===
List of shipwrecks: 8 July 1955
Ship	State	Description
Vindicator	United States	The 253-gross register ton, 126.1-foot (38.4 m) fishing vessel was lost when she struck a submerged reef off Cape Saint Elias on the southwestern tip of Kayak Island in the Territory of Alaska.

=== 12 July ===
List of shipwrecks: 12 July 1955
Ship	State	Description
La Flecha	Mexico	The passenger ship sank off Veracruz with the loss of 30 lives.

=== 13 July ===
List of shipwrecks: 13 July 1955
Ship	State	Description
Geologist	United Kingdom	The cargo ship collided with Sun Princess (Liberia) and sank off Corazal Point, Trinidad with the loss of twenty of her 42 crew. Geologist was on a voyage from Glasgow, Renfrewshire to Maracaibo, Venezuela.

=== 14 July ===
List of shipwrecks: 14 July 1955
Ship	State	Description
Cygnet	Liberia	The cargo ship was holed in a collision off the Goodwin Sands, Kent. All crew rescued by Baltic Clipper (flag unknown).

=== 15 July ===
List of shipwrecks: 15 July 1955
Ship	State	Description
M T B S Inc. V	United States	The 45-gross register ton, 50-foot (15.2 m) cargo barge was wrecked at Unalakleet, Territory of Alaska.

=== 16 July ===
List of shipwrecks: 16 July 1955
Ship	State	Description
Middlesex Trader	United Kingdom	The cargo ship ran aground in the Saint Lawrence River, 30 nautical miles (56 km) from Quebec City, Quebec, Canada.

=== 17 July ===
List of shipwrecks: 17 July 1955
Ship	State	Description
Alasco 3	United States	The 22-gross register ton, 46.3-foot (14.1 m) fishing vessel was wrecked at Deer Harbor (57°56′30″N 136°33′00″W) in Southeast Alaska.
Seine	United Kingdom	The coaster collided with the steamer Drochobyz (Soviet Union) 8 nautical miles (15 km) south west of Dungeness, Kent, England, and sank. All seven crew were rescued by Drochobyz.

=== 20 July ===
List of shipwrecks: 20 July 1955
Ship	State	Description
Ugashik Three	United States	The 33-gross register ton, 49.1-foot (15.0 m) fishing vessel was destroyed by fire on the Ugashik River near Ugashik, Territory of Alaska.

=== 21 July ===
List of shipwrecks: 21 July 1955
Ship	State	Description
Leader	United States	The 50-gross register ton, 65.3-foot (19.9 m) fishing vessel sank in the Bering Sea.

=== 22 July ===
List of shipwrecks: 22 July 1955
Ship	State	Description
Lucky Boy	United States	The 10-gross register ton, 32.8-foot (10.0 m) fishing vessel was wrecked on the beach at the northern end of Kalgin Island in Cook Inlet on the south-central coast of the Territory of Alaska.
Punta	Panama	The cargo ship ran aground on the Seven Stones reef, off Land's End, Cornwall, United Kingdom. All crew rescued. The ship broke up and sank the following day.

=== 23 July ===
List of shipwrecks: 23 July 1955
Ship	State	Description
Ansonia	United States	The 50-gross register ton, 63.4-foot (19.3 m) fishing vessel struck a rock and sank in Uyak Bay (57°48′N 154°04′W) on the coast of the Territory of Alaska′ Kodiak Island.

=== 27 July ===
List of shipwrecks: 27 July 1955
Ship	State	Description
Empire Claire	United Kingdom	Operation Sandcastle: The cargo ship was scuttled with a load of 16,000 German chemical bombs at 56°30′N 12°00′W.
Katy-T	United States	The 8-gross register ton, 29.3-foot (8.9 m) fishing vessel was destroyed by fire in Uyak Bay (57°48′N 154°04′W) on the coast of Kodiak Island in the Territory of Alaska′s Kodiak Archipelago.

=== 28 July ===
List of shipwrecks: 28 July 1955
Ship	State	Description
Vir Pandian	India	The coaster ran aground at Gopinath. Declared a constructive total loss, she was scrapped in situ.

=== 29 July ===
List of shipwrecks: 29 July 1955
Ship	State	Description
Star of Malta	(United Kingdom) Malta	The passenger ship ran aground at Valletta and was wrecked. One crew member and a passenger were killed.

== August ==
=== 4 August ===
List of shipwrecks: 4 August 1955
Ship	State	Description
Frolic	United States	The 14-gross register ton, 31.5-foot (9.6 m) fishing vessel was destroyed by fire while moored at Hydaburg, Territory of Alaska.

=== 6 August ===
List of shipwrecks: 6 August 1955
Ship	State	Description
Michael J	United States	The 9-gross register ton, 28.7-foot (8.7 m) pump-jet fishing vessel was destroyed by a storm off the southwest coast of the Territory of Alaska.

=== 10 August ===
List of shipwrecks: 10 August 1955
Ship	State	Description
North King	United States	The 256-gross register ton, 99-foot (30.2 m) fishing vessel was wrecked in the Aleutian Islands on the southwest coast of Unimak Island between Scotch Cap (54°23′40″N 164°44′41″W) and Sennett Point (54°29′00″N 164°54′30″W).

=== 11 August ===
List of shipwrecks: 11 August 1955
Ship	State	Description
A R 3	United States	The 8-gross register ton, 27.5-foot (8.4 m) fishing vessel was lost after colliding with the vessel Alaskan Reefer (United States) 1.5 nautical miles (2.8 km; 1.7 mi) off Humpy Cove (56°51′30″N 154°01′00″W) on the coast of the Territory of Alaska's Kodiak Island.

=== 14 August ===
List of shipwrecks: 14 August 1955
Ship	State	Description
Enos	United States	The 25-gross register ton, 45-foot (13.7 m) fishing vessel was wrecked at "Lazarita Island" – probably a reference to Larzatita Island (55°35′05″N 133°14′40″W) – in Southeast Alaska.
Levin J. Marvel	United States	Hurricane Connie: With 23 passengers and a crew of four aboard, the 183-gross register ton, 128-foot (39 m) three-masted sightseeing schooner dragged her anchors in 10-to-15-foot (3.0 to 4.6 m) seas, rolled over twice, breaking her masts, and settled on her starboard side in 21 feet (6.4 m) of water in the Chesapeake Bay off North Beach, Maryland, with the loss of 12 lives.

=== 25 August ===
List of shipwrecks: 25 August 1955
Ship	State	Description
Aksala	United States	The 8-gross register ton, 31.3-foot (9.5 m) fishing vessel sank in Nutkwa Inlet (55°02′N 132°36′W) on the southwest coast of Prince of Wales Island in the Alexander Archipelago in Southeast Alaska.
Argobeam	United Kingdom	The cargo ship caught fire in the Atlantic Ocean during a hurricane and was abandoned by her crew. She was on a voyage from the Hampton Roads, Virginia, United States to Copenhagen, Denmark. Argobeam was taken in tow by the tug Salveda (United Kingdom) and taken in to Stornoway, Isle of Lewis, where she arrived on 28 August. Subsequently sold, repaired and returned to service as Parkgate.

=== 27 August ===
List of shipwrecks: 27 August 1955
Ship	State	Description
Parks No. 2	United States	The 7-gross register ton, 29.5-foot (9.0 m) fishing vessel sank at Harriet Point (60°24′N 152°15′W) in Cook Inlet on the south-central coast of the Territory of Alaska.

=== 28 August ===
List of shipwrecks: 28 August 1955
Ship	State	Description
Harold J	United States	The tug sank in the Bering Sea near Lopp Lagoon on the coast of the Territory of Alaska during a gale with the loss of three lives.

=== Unknown date ===
List of shipwrecks: Unknown date 1955
Ship	State	Description
Hans Egede	Netherlands	The schooner caught fire off the Dutch coast. Towed to Dover, Kent, United Kingdom where fire was extinguished.

== September ==
=== 4 September ===
List of shipwrecks: 4 September 1955
Ship	State	Description
Ambes	France	The tug capsized and sank in the Gironde Estuary following a collision with Lipari (United States). Three crew were killed.
La France	United States	The 18-gross register ton, 35.7-foot (10.9 m) fishing vessel was destroyed by fire in Southeast Alaska between Moira Sound and Ketchikan, Territory of Alaska.

=== 9 September ===
List of shipwrecks: 9 September 1955
Ship	State	Description
Alte	Norway	The 100.4-foot (30.6 m), 129-ton dry cargo ship, a former trawler, was in a collision off Stavanger. She sank later 80 miles (130 km) northeast of Langeneset, Vestland.
Ruth	United States	While near San Juan Bautista Island (55°26′N 133°16′W) in Southeast Alaska between Craig and Hydaburg, Territory of Alaska, the 30-foot (9.1 m) troller suffered an explosion caused by a fuel line for her gasoline engine leaking near her galley stove, then was destroyed by the resulting fire. Three of her five crewmen were killed in the explosion, and another disappeared and presumably drowned while trying to swim to shore, leaving only one survivor, who was rescued.

=== 15 September ===
List of shipwrecks: 15 September 1955
Ship	State	Description
California	United States	The 104-foot (32 m), 82-gross register ton fishing trawler sank in up to 50 feet (15 m) of water at (42°40′25″N 070°34′19″W) after running aground on a reef off Rockport, Massachusetts, between Dry Salvages and Little Salvages.

=== 16 September ===
List of shipwrecks: 16 September 1955
Ship	State	Description
Mikie	United States	The 7-gross register ton, 27.9-foot (8.5 m) fishing vessel was destroyed by fire in Fortuna Strait (57°25′N 135°53′W) near Chichagof Island in the Alexander Archipelago in Southeast Alaska.

=== 26 September ===
List of shipwrecks: 26 September 1955
Ship	State	Description
Jean O	United States	The 13-gross register ton, 39.6-foot (12.1 m) fishing vessel was destroyed by fire in Controller Bay (60°05′N 144°15′W) on the south-central coast of the Territory of Alaska.

=== 30 September ===
List of shipwrecks: 30 September 1955
Ship	State	Description
Lelonta II	Thailand	The yacht capsized and sank off Capraia, Italy. All twenty on board were rescued, including the owner of the yacht, Prince Biram of Siam.
Queen	United States	The 8-gross register ton, 29.8-foot (9.1 m) fishing vessel was destroyed by fire at Cordova, Territory of Alaska.

== October ==
=== 4 October ===
List of shipwrecks: 4 October 1955
Ship	State	Description
Fechenheim	West Germany	The cargo ship ran aground at Oslo, Norway and broke in two. All 42 crew were rescued.

=== 6 October ===
List of shipwrecks: 6 October 1955
Ship	State	Description
Thorodd	Norway	The cargo ship foundered in a storm south of Risør, Norway. Crew rescued by the cutter Grant.

=== 11 October ===
List of shipwrecks: 11 October 1955
Ship	State	Description
Wallsend	United Kingdom	The cargo ship ran aground at Hook of Holland, Netherlands. Refloated by 13 October.

=== 12 October ===
List of shipwrecks: 12 October 1955
Ship	State	Description
Conde de Barbate	Spain	The coaster collided with Columbie (France) and sank off Vigo with the loss of all five crew.

=== 14 October ===
List of shipwrecks: 14 October 1955
Ship	State	Description
HDMS Graadyb	Royal Danish Navy	The minesweeper was holed at the bow by an explosion at Holmen, Copenhagen. Subsequently decommissioned and scrapped.

=== 16 October ===
List of shipwrecks: 16 October 1955
Ship	State	Description
Bluebird	United Kingdom	The hydroplane sank in Lake Mead, Arizona and Nevada, United States. Salvaged and returned to service.

=== 19 October ===
List of shipwrecks: 19 October 1955
Ship	State	Description
Sturdee	United Kingdom	The sold off Strath-class naval trawler was wrecked in Aberdeen Bay north of the Aberdeen north breakwater in heavy ground swells and rain. The crew were rescued by the Aberdeen Lifeboat. The vessel was declared a constructive total loss and broken up in place.
HNLMS Tijgerhaai	Royal Netherlands Navy	The Zwaardvisch-class submarine ran aground at Weymouth, Dorset, United Kingdom. Refloated the same day.

=== 21 October ===
List of shipwrecks: 21 October 1955
Ship	State	Description
Regis	United States	The 29-gross register ton, 52.7-foot (16.1 m) fishing vessel was wrecked on Sullivan Island in Lynn Canal in Southeast Alaska.

=== 21 October ===
List of shipwrecks: 21 October 1955
Ship	State	Description
Strathcathro	United Kingdom	The sold off Strath-class naval trawler was wrecked 13 miles (21 km) west of Lagos, Protectorate of Nigeria.

=== 26 October ===
List of shipwrecks: 26 October 1955
Ship	State	Description
Antonio Sanchez Valdes	Mexico	The coaster sank in the Caribbean off the coast of Mexico with the loss of all 25 crew.

=== 27 October ===
List of shipwrecks: 27 October 1955
Ship	State	Description
Glenda Rae	United States	The 11-gross register ton, 29.1-foot (8.9 m) fishing vessel sank in Rocky Bay (59°14′15″N 151°25′00″W) near Seldovia, Territory of Alaska.

=== 28 October ===
List of shipwrecks: 28 October 1955
Ship	State	Description
Karmas	Sweden	The cargo ship ran aground at the mouth of the River Tees, Northumberland, United Kingdom. Refloated on 10 November.
William Lykes	United States	The ocean liner ran aground in Table Bay, South Africa. Refloated on 31 October.

=== 29 October ===
List of shipwrecks: 29 October 1955
Ship	State	Description
Novorossiyisk	Soviet Navy	The Conte di Cavour-class battleship was sunk by an explosion while at anchor at Sevastopol in the Soviet Union with the loss of 608 lives.

== November ==
=== 9 November ===
List of shipwrecks: 9 November 1955
Ship	State	Description
Last Chance	United States	The 7-gross register ton, 30.8-foot (9.4 m) fishing vessel was destroyed by fire in Anderson Bay in the Territory of Alaska. The wreck report does not identify which of several Anderson Bays the incident occurred in.

=== 10 November ===
List of shipwrecks: 10 November 1955
Ship	State	Description
Alice G II	United States	The 7-gross register ton, 29.7-foot (9.1 m) fishing vessel sank in Young Bay (58°10′N 134°40′W) on the coast of Admiralty Island in the Alexander Archipelago in Southeast Alaska.
Joyita	United Kingdom	The merchant vessel was found awash and adrift in the Pacific Ocean, with no one on board, more than 600 nautical miles (1,100 km; 690 mi) from her scheduled route, partially submerged and listing heavily. She had left Suva, Fiji, on 3 October and was expected to arrive at Funafuti in the Ellice islands on 5 October, but searches in the region after she was overdue had found no trace of her. Joyita was later salvaged and repaired.

=== 11 November ===
List of shipwrecks: 11 November 1955
Ship	State	Description
Nunivak	United States	The 49-gross register ton, 51-foot (15.5 m) fishing vessel sank at Kodiak, Territory of Alaska.

=== 12 November ===
List of shipwrecks: 12 November 1955
Ship	State	Description
Kishin Maru	Japan	The cargo ship sank on this date.

=== 15 November ===
List of shipwrecks: 15 November 1955
Ship	State	Description
City of Ghent	Ireland	The coaster sank three nautical miles (5.6 km; 3.5 mi) off the Lizard Lighthouse, Cornwall, United Kingdom. All seventeen crew rescued by the Cadgwith lifeboat.
Panagiotis	Greece	The Liberty ship ran aground at Kunsan, Korea and broke her back. Although declared a constructive total loss, she was rebuilt, lengthened and returned to service.

=== 16 November ===
List of shipwrecks: 16 November 1955
Ship	State	Description
Foulney	United Kingdom	The dredger was in collision off Fleetwood, Lancashire with the trawler Teroma (United Kingdom), which sank. Foulney was beached and refloated the next day.

=== 18 November ===
List of shipwrecks: 18 November 1955
Ship	State	Description
Mille	French Navy	The submarine ran aground in St. Paul's Bay, Malta. The vessel was refloated after six hours with assistance from two tugs.

=== 23 November ===
List of shipwrecks: 23 November 1955
Ship	State	Description
Albacore, and Nang Suang Nawa	Philippines; Thailand	The tug Albacore and cargo ship Nang Suang Nawa were lost at sea between Thailand and Hong Kong. Their last reported position was 17°56′N 113°54′E.

=== 25 November ===
List of shipwrecks: 25 November 1955
Ship	State	Description
Kismet II	Liberia	The cargo ship ean aground on a reef off Cape Breton Island, Nova Scotia, Canada (47°05′N 60°03′W). All 22 crew were rescued by a Royal Canadian Navy helicopter. She was on a voyage from Philadelphia, Pennsylvania to Summerside, Prince Edward Island, Canada. She was abandoned as a total loss.

=== 26 November ===
List of shipwrecks: 26 November 1955
Ship	State	Description
Seneff	Canada	The trawler, built in 1918 as a Navarin-class minesweeper for the French Navy, struck a submerged object off of Canso, Nova Scotia, and later sank; crew successfully rescued.

== December ==
=== 9 December ===
List of shipwrecks: 9 December 1955
Ship	State	Description
Darton	United Kingdom	The cargo ship ran aground off Gedser, Denmark but was refloated.

=== 14 December ===
List of shipwrecks: 14 December 1955
Ship	State	Description
Victoria City	United Kingdom	The cargo ship collided with Valentina Bibolini (Italy) 10 nautical miles (19 km) north of Ameland, Netherlands and sank.

=== 18 December ===
List of shipwrecks: 18 December 1955
Ship	State	Description
Sea Horse	United States	The 142-gross register ton, 100.2-foot (30.5 m) motor cargo vessel – a converted landing craft tank – sank in the Gulf of Alaska approximately 10 nautical miles (19 km; 12 mi) off East Chugach Island (59°08′N 151°28′W) off the coast of the Territory of Alaska.

=== 19 December ===
List of shipwrecks: 19 December 1955
Ship	State	Description
No. 535	(China) People's Liberation Army Navy	Chinese Civil War: The Type 53 patrol boat was sunk by Nationalist Republic F-84 Thunderjet aircraft. 17 killed with seven wounded.

=== 23 December ===
List of shipwrecks: 23 December 1955
Ship	State	Description
"Prince Charles"	United Kingdom	The 161.1-foot (49.1 m) fishing vessel stranded on Karken Island, 60 miles west of Hammerfest, in a snowstorm. 12 crew rescued by "Ingoy" (Norway), but her Captain, 8 crew and a Norwegian Pilot died. She capsized the next day. Salvaged by Norwegians in the Summer of 1956. Repaired, returned to service as "Loch Melfort".

=== 27 December ===
List of shipwrecks: 27 December 1955
Ship	State	Description
Tanda Maru	Japan	The cargo ship was driven ashore in a typhoon off Hachinohe, Aomori Prefecture, Honshu (40°34′N 141°21′E) and broke in two. Fourteen of her 24 crew were rescued by an American helicopter.

== Unknown date ==
List of shipwrecks: Unknown date December 1955
Ship	State	Description
ROCS Lu Shan	Republic of China Navy	The landing ship was wrecked c. 1954–1955.
Midland City	Canada	The ferry was deliberately run aground at Wye Marsh on the Georgian Bay coast of Ontario, Canada, and intentionally burnt as a means of disposal.
