= John Thomas Simpson =

Canadian politician

Member of Parliament for Simcoe North
- In office July 1930 – October 1935
- Preceded by: William Alves Boys
- Succeeded by: Duncan Fletcher McCuaig

Personal details
- Born: John Thomas Simpson; 27 October 1870 Waverley, Ontario, Canada
- Died: 13 December 1965 (aged 95)
- Party: Conservative
- Spouse(s): Annie Clute m. 3 November 1897
- Profession: farmer

John Thomas Simpson (27 October 1870 – 13 December 1965) was a Conservative member of the House of Commons of Canada. He was born in Waverley, Ontario and became a farmer and a municipal politician.

Simpson attended schools in Simcoe County, including Barrie Collegiate Institute. He served on the council of Simcoe County for 12 years, serving as councillor and reeve of Tiny Township, becoming the county warden in 1913 and county clerk in 1922. In 1919, he was an unsuccessful candidate in the 1919 Ontario election.

He was first elected to Parliament at the Simcoe North riding in the 1930 general election. After serving one term in the House of Commons, he was defeated by Duncan Fletcher McCuaig of the Liberal party in the 1935 election.
