= Adam Chambers =

Adam Chambers may refer to:

- Adam Chambers (politician), Canadian politician in Ontario
- Adam Chambers (footballer) (born 1980), English footballer
