= Crescent Beach, Ontario =

Crescent Beach, Ontario can mean the following places:

- Crescent Beach, Simcoe County, Ontario
- Crescent Beach, York Regional Municipality, Ontario
