= Aldy =

Aldy can refer to:

- Battle of Aldy, 1785 battle fought by the Russian Empire
- Aldy Bernard (fl. 2018–present), Dominican model and entrepreneur
- Aldy Meinhardt (fl. 1962–1963), Canadian freestyle and butterfly swimmer
- Isaïe Aldy Beausoleil (1902–????), French Canadian murderer
