= Julian Ferguson =

Canadian politician

Member of Parliament for Simcoe North
- In office June 1945 – April 1957
- Preceded by: Duncan Fletcher McCuaig
- Succeeded by: Heber Smith

Personal details
- Born: Julian Harcourt Ferguson; 2 June 1895 Barrie, Ontario
- Died: 6 May 1965 (aged 69)
- Party: Progressive Conservative
- Spouse(s): Muriel Bryson (m. 10 October 1941)
- Profession: insurance agent, insurance broker, manufacturer

Julian Harcourt Ferguson (2 June 1895 – 6 May 1965) was a Progressive Conservative party member of the House of Commons of Canada. He was born in Barrie, Ontario and had careers in insurance and manufacturing.

He was first elected at the Simcoe North riding in the 1945 general election and re-elected there in 1949 and 1953. After the end of his final term, the 22nd Canadian Parliament, Ferguson left the House of Commons and did not seek re-election in the 1957 election

Ferguson's granduncle was Thomas Roberts Ferguson, a member of Ontario's first Legislative Assembly and of Canada's first Parliament.
