= Simcoe South (federal electoral district) =

Former federal electoral district in Ontario, Canada

Ontario electoral district

Defunct federal electoral district
- Legislature: House of Commons
- District created: 1867, 1976
- District abolished: 1924, 1987
- First contested: 1867
- Last contested: 1984

Simcoe South was a federal electoral district represented in the House of Commons of Canada from 1867 to 1925, and from 1979 to 1988. It was located north of Toronto in the province of Ontario. It was initially created by the British North America Act 1867 when the County of Simcoe was divided into two ridings, to be called the South and North Ridings in the Legislative Assembly of the Province of Canada.

The South Riding consisted of the Townships of West Gwillimbury, Tecumseh, Innisfil, Essa, Tossorontio, Mulmur, and the Village of Bradford.

In 1882, the electoral district of the County of Simcoe was divided into three ridings. The South Riding consisted of the townships of Mulmur, Tossorontio, Essa, Innisfil, and Tecumseth, and the village of Alliston.

In 1903, the south riding was redefined to consist of the townships of Adjala, Essa, Gwillimbury West, Innisfil, Tecumseth and Tossorontio, the towns of Alliston and Barrie, and the villages of Beeton, Bradford and Tottenham.

The electoral district was abolished in 1924 when it was incorporated into Dufferin—Simcoe riding.

It was recreated in 1976 from parts of Grey—Simcoe, Peel—Dufferin—Simcoe and York—Simcoe ridings. It consisted of the City of Barrie and the Townships of Essa, Flos, Innisfil, Tecumseth, Vespra and West Gwillimbury, but excluding the Towns of Alliston and Wasaga Beach.

The electoral district was abolished in 1987 when it was redistributed between Simcoe Centre, Simcoe North and York—Simcoe ridings.

== Members of Parliament ==
This riding has elected the following members of Parliament:

Parliament	Years	Member	Party
1st	1867–1872	William Carruthers Little	Liberal–Conservative
2nd	1872–1874	William Carruthers Little	Liberal–Conservative
3rd	1874–1878	William Carruthers Little	Liberal–Conservative
4th	1878–1881†	William Carruthers Little	Liberal–Conservative
4th	1882–1882	Richard Tyrwhitt	Conservative
5th	1882–1887	Richard Tyrwhitt	Conservative
6th	1887–1891	Richard Tyrwhitt	Conservative
7th	1891–1896	Richard Tyrwhitt	Conservative
8th	1896–1900†	Richard Tyrwhitt	Conservative
9th	1900–1904	Haughton Lennox	Conservative
10th	1904–1908	Haughton Lennox	Conservative
11th	1908–1911	Haughton Lennox	Conservative
12th	1911–1912	Haughton Lennox	Conservative
12th	1912–1917	William Alves Boys	Conservative
13th	1917–1921	William Alves Boys	Government (Unionist)
14th	1921–1925	William Alves Boys	Conservative
Riding dissolved into Dufferin—Simcoe
Riding re-created from Grey—Simcoe, Peel—Dufferin—Simcoe and York—Simcoe
31st	1979–1980	Ronald Stewart	Progressive Conservative
32nd	1980–1984	Ronald Stewart	Progressive Conservative
33rd	1984–1988	Ronald Stewart	Progressive Conservative
Riding dissolved into Simcoe Centre, Simcoe North and York—Simcoe

== Election results ==
=== Simcoe South, 1867–1925 ===
1867 Canadian federal election
Party	Candidate	Votes
Liberal–Conservative	William Carruthers Little	1,411
Independent	Thomas Saunders	1,055

1872 Canadian federal election
Party	Candidate	Votes
Liberal–Conservative	William Carruthers Little	Acclaimed

1874 Canadian federal election
Party	Candidate	Votes
Liberal–Conservative	William Carruthers Little	Acclaimed

1878 Canadian federal election
Party	Candidate	Votes
Liberal–Conservative	William Carruthers Little	1,137
Independent	Geo. Fletcher	694

Canadian federal by-election, 1882
Party	Candidate	Votes
Conservative	Richard Tyrwhitt	Acclaimed

1882 Canadian federal election
Party	Candidate	Votes
Conservative	Richard Tyrwhitt	1,441
Independent	D. Dunn	1,435

1887 Canadian federal election
Party	Candidate	Votes
Conservative	Richard Tyrwhitt	1,834
Liberal	W. Wright	774

1891 Canadian federal election
Party	Candidate	Votes
Conservative	Richard Tyrwhitt	Acclaimed

1896 Canadian federal election
Party	Candidate	Votes
Conservative	Richard Tyrwhitt	2,146
Patrons of Industry	Thos. W. Lennox	1,620

1900 Canadian federal election
Party	Candidate	Votes
Conservative	Haughton Lennox	2,331
Liberal	Jos. Whitesides	1,409

1904 Canadian federal election
Party	Candidate	Votes
Conservative	Haughton Lennox	1,702
Liberal	William C. Henry	1,643

1908 Canadian federal election
Party	Candidate	Votes
Conservative	Haughton Lennox	2,830
Liberal	James Campbell	1,300

1911 Canadian federal election
Party	Candidate	Votes
Conservative	Haughton Lennox	3,278
Liberal	Thomas Hammell	1,636

Canadian federal by-election, 1912
Party	Candidate	Votes
Conservative	William Alves Boys	Acclaimed

1917 Canadian federal election
Party	Candidate	Votes
Government (Unionist)	William Alves Boys	5,771
Opposition (Laurier Liberals)	John Henry Mitchell	1,157

1921 Canadian federal election
Party	Candidate	Votes
Conservative	William Alves Boys	6,509
Progressive	Compton Barker Jeffs	4,758

=== Simcoe South, 1979–1988 ===
1979 Canadian federal election
Party	Candidate	Votes
Progressive Conservative	Ronald Stewart	25,483
Liberal	Ray Ramsay	12,687
New Democratic	Gaye Lamb	8,307

1980 Canadian federal election
Party	Candidate	Votes
Progressive Conservative	Ronald Stewart	19,768
Liberal	Bruce Owen	16,174
New Democratic	Paul Wessenger	9,474

1984 Canadian federal election
Party	Candidate	Votes
Progressive Conservative	Ronald Stewart	30,702
Liberal	Bruce Owen	13,900
New Democratic	Frank Berry	8,283

== See also ==
- List of Canadian electoral districts
- Historical federal electoral districts of Canada
