= Duncan Fletcher McCuaig =

Canadian politician

Member of Parliament for Simcoe North
- In office 1935–1945
- Preceded by: John Thomas Simpson
- Succeeded by: Julian Ferguson

Mayor of Barrie, Ontario
- In office 1928–1931
- Preceded by: Walter Duff
- Succeeded by: John Craig

Personal details
- Born: 26 August 1889 Oro, Ontario
- Died: 17 August 1950 (aged 60)
- Party: Liberal
- Children: Janice Laking
- Profession: lawyer

Duncan Fletcher McCuaig (August 26, 1889 – August 17, 1950) was a Canadian politician who served in the House of Commons from 1935 to 1945, representing the electoral district of Simcoe North as a member of the Liberal Party. He had previously served as mayor of Barrie, Ontario from 1928 to 1931.

His daughter Janice later served for twelve years as mayor of Barrie, and herself mounted an unsuccessful campaign for election to the House of Commons in 1993.
