= Heber Smith =

Canadian politician

Heber Edgar Smith
- Official 1966 portrait

Member of Parliament for Simcoe North
- In office June 1957 – April 1968

Personal details
- Born: 8 August 1915 Tiny, Ontario, Canada
- Died: 25 October 1990 (aged 75)
- Party: Progressive Conservative
- Profession: Barrister, lawyer

Heber Edgar Smith (8 August 1915 – 25 October 1990) was a Progressive Conservative party member of the House of Commons of Canada. He was born in Tiny, Ontario and became a barrister and lawyer by career.

He was first elected at the Simcoe North riding in the 1957 general election, then re-elected there in 1958, 1962, 1963 and 1965. After completing his final term, the 27th Canadian Parliament, Smith did not seek re-election and left federal politics in 1968.
