= William Carruthers Little =

Canadian politician

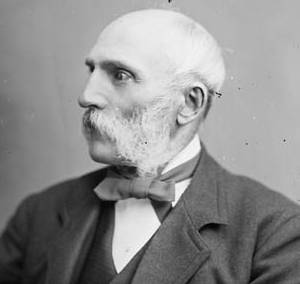

Member of the Canadian Parliament for Simcoe South
- In office 1867–1881
- Succeeded by: Richard Tyrwhitt

Personal details
- Born: 1820 Stroud, Gloucestershire, England
- Died: December 31, 1881 (aged 61) Allandale, Ontario, Canada
- Party: Liberal-Conservative
- Children: Edward Alfred Little
- Occupation: farmer

William Carruthers Little (1820 – 31 December 1881) was an Ontario farmer and political figure. He represented Simcoe South in the House of Commons of Canada as a Liberal-Conservative from 1867 to 1881.

He was born in Stroud, Gloucestershire, England in 1820, the son of John Little. He was a land surveyor in Australia and had also been a sailor; he came to Upper Canada in 1837 or 1847. He served as a member of the council for Innisfil Township, also served as reeve and was a member of the council for Simcoe County. Little was a major in the local militia and also served as president of the Innisfil Agricultural Society. Little died in office in Allandale at the age of 61.

Little was married twice: to Mary Hamil in 1854 and to Mary Harriet Bennett in 1869. His son Edward represented Cardwell in the Legislative Assembly of Ontario. Another son, also named William Carruthers Little, was chief clerk in the Department of Railways and Canals and was also captain of the Ottawa Rough Riders.

Little is the great-grandfather of impressionist Rich Little.
