= Isaïe Beausoleil =

French Canadian murderer

Isaïe Aldy Beausoleil
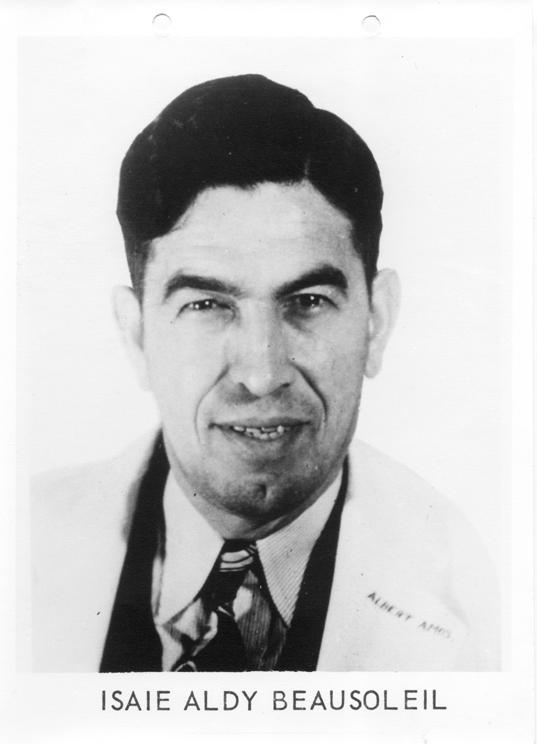

FBI Ten Most Wanted Fugitive
- Charges: First degree murder
- Alias: Albert C. Amos; Aldie Beausoleil; Raymond Blair; Rita Bennett; Frenchy

Description
- Born: April 21, 1902; Tiny Township, Simcoe County, Ontario, Canada
- Died: Unknown
- Race: White
- Gender: Male

Status
- Added: March 3, 1952
- Caught: June 25, 1953
- Number: 33
- Captured

Isaïe Aldy Beausoleil (born April 21, 1902) was a French Canadian convicted murderer who went by multiple aliases who was on the FBI Ten Most Wanted Fugitives list in 1952, after a warrant of first-degree murder was issued for him relating to the death of a 47-year-old woman who was his girlfriend in Michigan in 1949.

== Early life ==
Isaïe Beausoleil was born in Simcoe, Ontario, to French-Canadian parents, Elie Beausoleil and Mary Anne Trottier. The family emigrated to the United States in 1916 to work in textile mills. In 1920, they lived in Providence, Rhode Island, where he worked in a worsted mill. He had also amassed a lengthy criminal record. He married Catherine Schenk in 1956 and they lived together in Chicago.

== Capture and aftermath ==
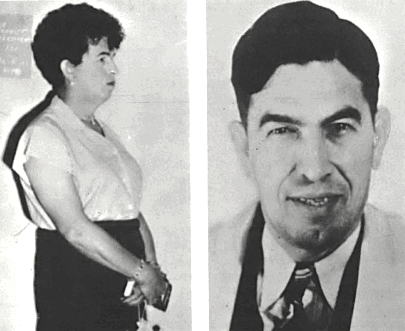
Beausoleil dressed in drag post arrest.

Beausoleil was captured in Chicago in 1953 while dressed as a woman when he was seen wearing a black satin bathing suit and a green skirt after it was revealed to be Beausoleil disguised in drag. And after there were reports of 'suspicious behaviour' in a women's restroom he was then arrested by a policewoman. In September 1953, he was deported back to Canada for violating immigration laws and sentenced to five years of probation for unlawful entry to the United States. He then stood trial for other crimes and received terms for attempted robbery and escape.
