= Wye Marsh =

Wetland in Ontario, Canada

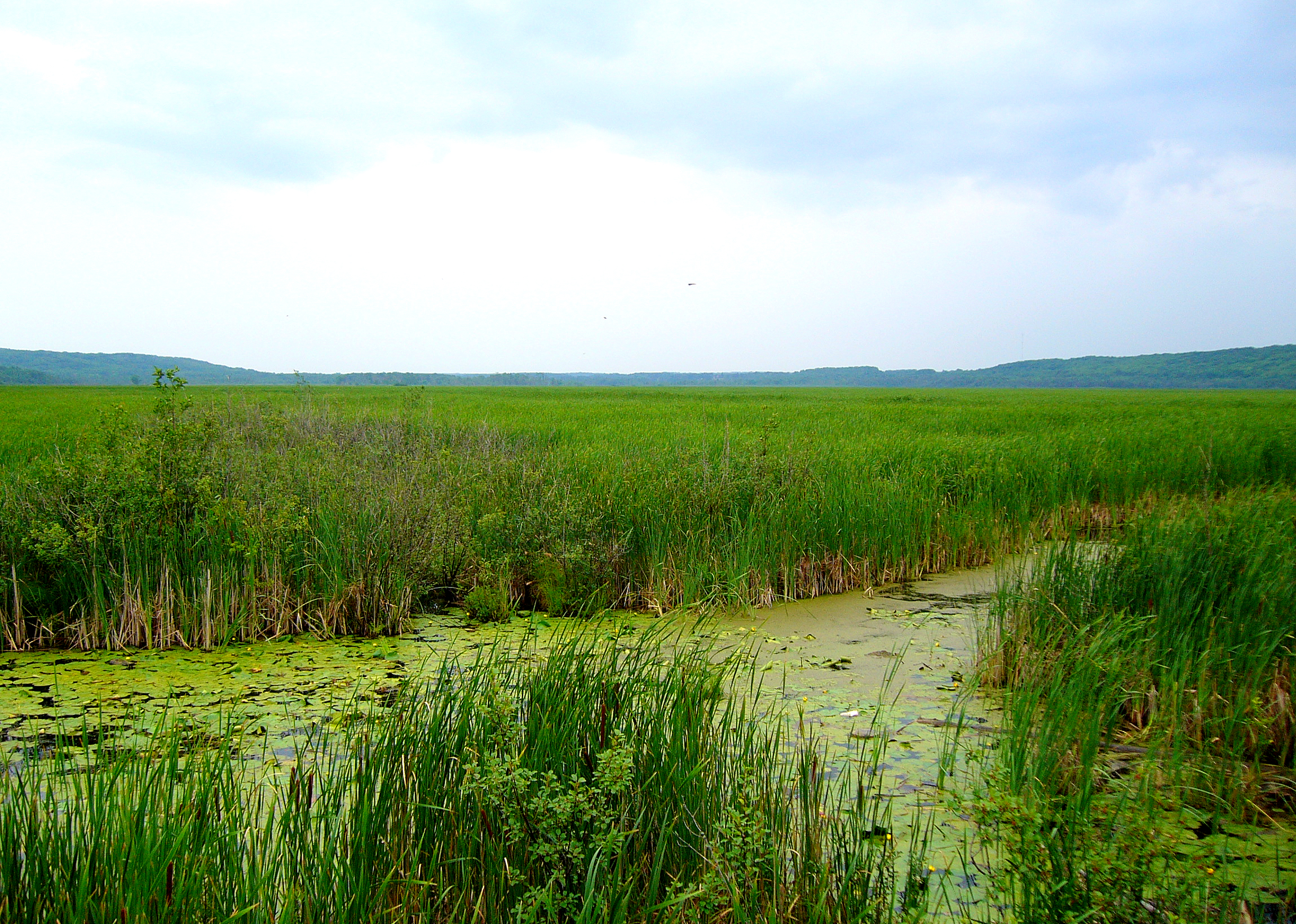

- Location within Ontario
- Location: Simcoe County
- Nearest city: Midland, Ontario
- Coordinates: 44°43′N 79°51′W
- Area: 1,000 ha (2,500 acres)
- Visitors: 35000 (in 2001)

The Wye Marsh is a wetland area on the south shores of Georgian Bay in Ontario, Canada. The Wye Marsh National Wildlife Area was established on the location in 1978. It is designated a Provincially Significant Wetland by the Ontario Ministry of Natural Resources.

== Settlement ==
The area was inhabited by Wendat (Huron) people when the Jesuit missionaries arrived in 1639. The Jesuit established a mission on the north-east corner of Wye Lake, the site is now known as Sainte-Marie among the Hurons. The largest Wendat village of the time was situated between Wye Marsh and nearby Tiny Marsh. By 1650 conflict with Haudenosaunee had driven all of the surviving missionaries to Quebec, along with the surviving Wendat. The area remained unpopulated for 150 years.

In the early 19th century, a naval base open in Penetanguishene, and settlement of the area by Europeans began in earnest. Wyebridge became the major business centre of Simcoe County, and by the 1860s Midland was surpassed only by Ottawa as a logging town in Ontario. Deforestation led to small streams which fed the marsh drying up, and serious soil erosion along the Wye River depositing into Wye Lake. In the 20th century the site of Wye Marsh was a privately owned hunting preserve, until it was turned into a wildlife area by the federal and provincial governments.

== Administration ==
The Canadian Wildlife Service established the Wye Marsh Wildlife Centre in 1969. In 1985, the day-to-day administration of the centre was taken over by the Friends of the Wye Marsh through special agreement with Environment Canada. Most of the land is owned by the Province of Ontario, and administered through the Wye Marsh Wildlife Management Area, and some land is owned by Environment Canada and administered through the Wye Marsh National Wildlife Area.

== Description ==
The marsh covers an area of around 4.5 km by 1.5 km. The area is primarily cattail marsh, although some areas are fen. Inside the parklands there is also a small amount of dense coniferous swamp and upland forests. In the centre of the marsh is an area of open water known as Mud Lake or Wye Lake. The lake covers 125 hectares and has a typical depth of 80 to 140 centimeters.

== Ecology ==
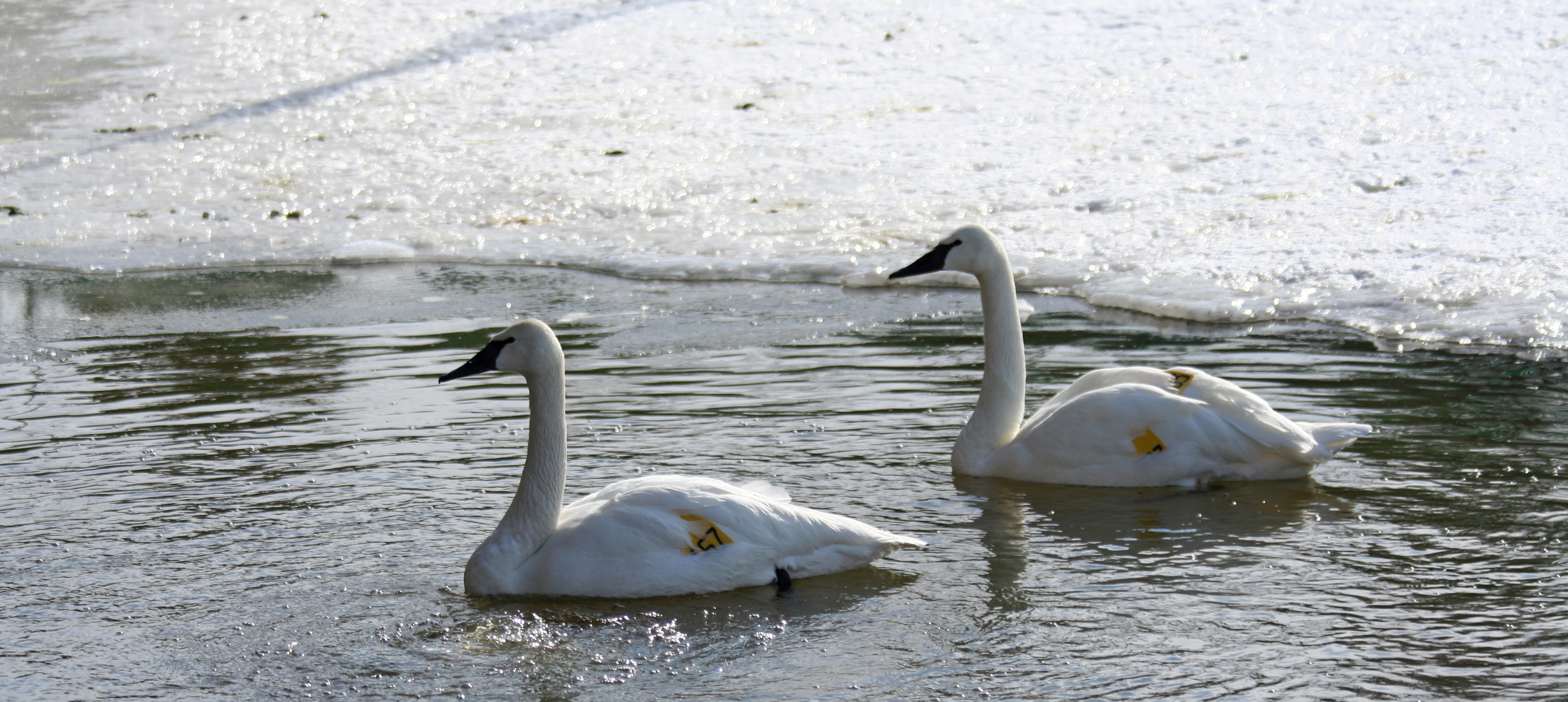
Trumpeter swans at the Wye Marsh

The Wye Marsh Wildlife Centre runs a breeding programme for trumpeter swans. The centre, and its volunteers, monitor approximately one-third of all trumpeter swans in Ontario. The swans had been absent from the marsh until a reintroduction programme by Harry Lumsden in the 1980s, as an employee of the Ontario Department of Natural Resources. Archeological evidence collected by Jesuit missionaries in the 17th century suggests that the area previously had significant concentrations of trumpeter swans, and historical references indicate the same. While hunters armed only with bows and arrows would have had a difficult time hunting the swan, the introduction of firearms by European explorers would have made the swan a tempting target for hunters. By 1850, only small numbers of the swan remained in Eastern Canada, and the last sighting of a trumpeter swan in Ontario before reintroduction occurred in 1884. Among Ontarians, the Wye Marsh Wildlife Centre has is known as the Home of the Trumpeter Swan.

The marsh is also an important breeding site for black terns and least bitterns. At least 1% of the breeding pairs of least bitterns in Canada nest in the Wye Marsh.

Other bird species known to inhabit the marsh include: red-winged blackbirds, common grackles, brown-headed cowbirds, sandhill cranes, common mergansers, double-crested cormorants, great blue herons, marsh wrens, tree swallows, common yellowthroats, ring-billed gulls, common moorhens, mallard ducks, wood ducks, Canada geese, barn swallows and soras.

Historically, the marsh supported large amounts of wild rice, which served as an important food source for waterfowl. The introduction of carp in the early 20th century significantly reduced the amount of wild rice, and consequently the number of waterfowl.

== Public recreation ==
Hunting, fishing and trapping are all conducted in the Wye Marsh, although their popularity is decreasing. By 2001, the annual number of hunting permits issued had dropped from the 1970s level of 250 - 300 per year to 60 - 90 per year. Fishing dropped off after 1990 due to low water levels and increasing vegetation levels, and Muskrats, the most popular animal for trapping, experienced an unexplained population crash in 1994.

The Wildlife Center offers a number of services to tourists of the marsh. Canoe rentals are available, including guided canoe tours of the marsh. The wildlife areas have over 30 kilometers of hiking trails, and offer programmes for school groups and private groups. Other available recreation activities include skiing and snowshoeing.
