= Richard Tyrwhitt =

Canadian politician

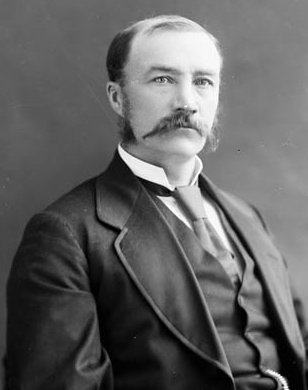

Member of the Canadian Parliament for Simcoe South
- In office 1882–1900
- Preceded by: William Carruthers Little
- Succeeded by: Haughton Lennox

Personal details
- Born: November 29, 1844 Simcoe County, Canada West
- Died: June 22, 1900 (aged 55) Bradford, Ontario, Canada
- Party: Conservative

Richard Tyrwhitt (November 29, 1844 – June 22, 1900) was a Canadian politician.

Born in Simcoe County, Canada West, the son of William Tyrwhitt, he was educated in Barrie and also privately tutored. Tyrwhitt became a farmer in Bradford. In 1870, he married Emma Whitaker.

Tyrwhitt was elected to the House of Commons of Canada for the Ontario electoral district of Simcoe South in an 1882 by-election held after the death of the sitting MP, William Carruthers Little. A Conservative, he was re-elected at the general elections of 1882, 1887, 1891, and 1896. He died while in office in 1900. He was a Lieutenant-Colonel with the 36th Peel Battalion of Infantry, now part of The Lorne Scots. He served during the North-West Rebellion and the Fenian raids.

== Electoral record ==
1887 Canadian federal election: York North
Party	Candidate	Votes
Liberal	William Mulock	2,526
Conservative	Richard Tyrwhitt	2,231
