= Simcoe North (federal electoral district) =

Federal electoral district in Ontario, Canada

Coordinates: 44.68°N 79.64°W

Ontario electoral district
- Interactive map of riding boundaries from the 2025 federal election

Federal electoral district
- Legislature: House of Commons
MP
Adam Chambers
Conservative
- District created: 1867
- First contested: 1867
- Last contested: 2025
- District webpage: profile, map

Demographics
- Population (2021): 120,656
- Electors (2015): 85,156
- Area (km²): 1,752
- Pop. density (per km²): 68.9
- Census division: Simcoe County
- Census subdivision(s): Orillia, Midland, Severn, Tiny, Tay, Ramara, Penetanguishene, Chippewas of Rama, Christian Island, Christian Island

Simcoe North (French: Simcoe-Nord) is a federal electoral district in central Ontario, Canada. It was established as a federal riding in 1867, and is the only electoral district in Ontario, and one of four in Canada, that has continually existed since Confederation.

== Demographics ==
According to the 2021 Canadian census, 2023 representation

Racial groups: 84.2% White, 11.4% Indigenous, 1.0% South Asian
Languages: 91.1% English, 3.6% French
Religions: 54.2% Christian (24.4% Catholic, 7.2% United Church, 6.1% Anglican, 3.0% Presbyterian, 1.6% Baptist, 11.9% Other), 43.4% None.
Median income: $38,400 (2020)
Average income: $48,040 (2020)

== Geography ==
The district includes all of the north and eastern parts of Simcoe County. Municipalities and Indian reserves include Midland, Orillia, Penetanguishene, Tay, Tiny, Christian Island 30, Christian Island 30A, Severn, Ramara, and Mnjikaning First Nation. The area is 1,752 km^{2} (676 sq mi).

== History ==
The electoral district was created in 1867 by the British North America Act. In 1867, it included the townships of Nottawasaga, Sunnidale, Vespra, Flos, Oro, Medonte, Orillia and Matchedash, Tiny and Tay, Balaklava and Robinson, and the Towns of Barrie and Collingwood. In 1882, it lost Oro, Medonte, Orillia and Matchedash, Tiny and Tay, and Balaklava and Robinson. In 1903, it gained Oro, but lost Barrie. In 1947, it lost Oro and gained Barrie. In 1966, it lost Nottawasaga, Sunnidale and Flos and gained Penetanguishene, Matchedash, Medonte, Orillia, Oro, and Tay. In 1976, it gained the townships of Mara, Rama and Tiny but Lost Barrie and Vespra. In 1987, it gained Flos Township, only to lose it again in the 1996 redistribution. In the 2003 redistribution, its southern boundary was altered slightly to follow the boundary of the new municipality of Springwater in neighbouring Simcoe—Grey with the municipalities of Oro-Medonte, Tiny and Tay in Simcoe North. In 2013, the riding lost all of Oro-Medonte west of 9 Line.

Following the 2022 Canadian federal electoral redistribution, the riding lost the rest of Oro-Medonte to Barrie—Springwater—Oro-Medonte, a small piece of territory near Port Severn as well as the Sawdust Islands, Green Island, Canary Island and Marshal Island that was annexed by the Municipality of Georgian Bay to Parry Sound—Muskoka.

== Riding associations ==
Riding associations are the local branches of the national political parties:

Party	Association name	CEO	HQ city
Christian Heritage Party of Canada	CHP Simcoe North	Adrian P. Kooger	Orillia
Conservative Party of Canada	Simcoe North Conservative Association	Charlene E. Anderson	Midland
Green Party of Canada	Simcoe North Green Party Association	Erik Schomann	Tiny
Liberal Party of Canada	Simcoe North Federal Liberal Association	Ryan D. Barber	Midland
New Democratic Party	Simcoe North Federal NDP Riding Association	Brian Trujillo	Ottawa
People's Party of Canada	Barrie-Simcoe PPC Association	Myles Wilson	Orillia

== Members of Parliament ==
Simcoe North has elected the following members of Parliament to represent it in the House of Commons of Canada:

Parliament	Years	Member	Party
Simcoe North
1st	1867–1872	Thomas David McConkey	Liberal
2nd	1872–1874	Herman Henry Cook	Liberal
3rd	1874–1878	Herman Henry Cook	Liberal
4th	1878–1882	Dalton McCarthy	Conservative
5th	1882–1887	Dalton McCarthy	Conservative
6th	1887–1891	Dalton McCarthy	Conservative
7th	1891–1896	Dalton McCarthy	Independent
8th	1896–1898	Dalton McCarthy	McCarthyite
8th	1898–1900	Leighton McCarthy	Independent
9th	1900–1904	Leighton McCarthy	Independent
10th	1904–1908	Leighton McCarthy	Independent
11th	1908–1911	John Allister Currie	Conservative
12th	1911–1917	John Allister Currie	Conservative
13th	1917–1921	John Allister Currie	Government (Unionist)
14th	1921–1925	Thomas Edwin Ross	Progressive
15th	1925–1926	William Alves Boys	Conservative
16th	1926–1930	William Alves Boys	Conservative
17th	1930–1935	John Thomas Simpson	Conservative
18th	1935–1940	Duncan Fletcher McCuaig	Liberal
19th	1940–1945	Duncan Fletcher McCuaig	Liberal
20th	1945–1949	Julian Ferguson	Progressive Conservative
21st	1949–1953	Julian Ferguson	Progressive Conservative
22nd	1953–1957	Julian Ferguson	Progressive Conservative
23rd	1957–1958	Heber Smith	Progressive Conservative
24th	1958–1962	Heber Smith	Progressive Conservative
25th	1962–1963	Heber Smith	Progressive Conservative
26th	1963–1965	Heber Smith	Progressive Conservative
27th	1965–1968	Heber Smith	Progressive Conservative
28th	1968–1972	Philip Bernard Rynard	Progressive Conservative
29th	1972–1974	Philip Bernard Rynard	Progressive Conservative
30th	1974–1979	Philip Bernard Rynard	Progressive Conservative
31st	1979–1980	Doug Lewis	Progressive Conservative
32nd	1980–1984	Doug Lewis	Progressive Conservative
33rd	1984–1988	Doug Lewis	Progressive Conservative
34th	1988–1993	Doug Lewis	Progressive Conservative
35th	1993–1997	Paul DeVillers	Liberal
36th	1997–2000	Paul DeVillers	Liberal
37th	2000–2004	Paul DeVillers	Liberal
38th	2004–2006	Paul DeVillers	Liberal
39th	2006–2008	Bruce Stanton	Conservative
40th	2008–2011	Bruce Stanton	Conservative
41st	2011–2015	Bruce Stanton	Conservative
42nd	2015–2019	Bruce Stanton	Conservative
43rd	2019–2021	Bruce Stanton	Conservative
44th	2021–2025	Adam Chambers	Conservative
45th	2025–present	Adam Chambers	Conservative

== Election results ==
Graph of election results in Simcoe North (1874–2019, minor parties that never got 2% of the vote or didn't run consistently are omitted) View source data.

2025 Canadian federal election
Party	Candidate	Votes	%	±%
Conservative	Adam Chambers	32,241	48.41	+6.23
Liberal	Ryan Rocca	29,767	44.69	+13.86
New Democratic	Melissa Lloyd	2,508	3.77	–12.19
Green	Ray Little	1,260	1.89	–1.16
People's	Stephen Toivo Makk	638	0.96	–6.69
Christian Heritage	Russ Emo	191	0.29	–0.04
Total valid votes		66,605	99.28	
Total rejected ballots		482	0.72	+0.24
Turnout		67,087	68.61	+6.21
Eligible voters		97,780		
Conservative notional hold		Swing		–3.82
Source: Elections Canada

2021 federal election redistributed results
Party	Vote	%
Conservative	24,617	42.18
Liberal	17,995	30.83
New Democratic	9,315	15.96
People's	4,465	7.65
Green	1,780	3.05
Christian Heritage	192	0.33
Total valid votes	58,364	99.52
Rejected ballots	280	0.48
Registered voters/ estimated turnout	93,986	62.40

2021 Canadian federal election
Party	Candidate	Votes	%	±%	Expenditures
Conservative	Adam Chambers	27,383	43.0	-0.4	$124,130.04
Liberal	Cynthia Wesley-Esquimaux	19,332	30.4	-0.4	$70,369.83
New Democratic	Janet-Lynne Durnford	9,958	15.7	+1.6	$7,481.15
People's	Stephen Makk	4,822	7.6	+5.8	$27,666.23
Green	Krystal Brooks	1,903	3.0	-6.4	$5,982.80
Christian Heritage	Russ Emo	210	0.3	–	$2,585.00
Total valid votes/expense limit		63,608	–	–	$127,623.16
Total rejected ballots		294			
Turnout		63,902	63.18		
Eligible voters		101,144			
Source: Elections Canada

2019 Canadian federal election
Party	Candidate	Votes	%	±%	Expenditures
Conservative	Bruce Stanton	27,241	43.4	-0.12	$100,103.63
Liberal	Gerry Hawes	19,310	30.8	-9.01	$83,974.59
New Democratic	Angelique Belcourt	8,850	14.1	+3.52	$4,832.36
Green	Valerie Powell	5,882	9.4	+4.94	$6,203.63
People's	Stephen Makk	1,154	1.8	–	$4,480.03
Christian Heritage	Chris Brown	341	0.5	-0.06	$2,923.18
Total valid votes/expense limit		62,778	100.0		
Total rejected ballots		358			
Turnout		63,136	65.0		
Eligible voters		97,148			
Conservative hold		Swing		+4.45	
Source: Elections Canada

2015 Canadian federal election: Simcoe North
Party	Candidate	Votes	%	±%	Expenditures
Conservative	Bruce Stanton	24,836	43.52	-10.36	$91,741.02
Liberal	Liz Riley	22,718	39.81	+20.56	$74,044.17
New Democratic	Richard Banigan	6,037	10.58	-9.85	$3,879.75
Green	Peter Stubbins	2,543	4.46	-1.4	$11,996.03
No Affiliation	Jacob Kearey-Moreland	618	1.08	–	$2,744.47
Christian Heritage	Scott Whittaker	319	0.56	-0.02	$2,753.34
Total valid votes/Expense limit		57,071	100.0		$224,845.90
Total rejected ballots		189	–	–	
Turnout		57,260	–	–	
Eligible voters		86,859			
Conservative hold		Swing		-15.46	
Source: Elections Canada

2011 federal election redistributed results
Party	Vote	%
Conservative	27,796	53.88
New Democratic	10,540	20.43
Liberal	9,932	19.25
Green	3,021	5.86
Christian Heritage	301	0.58

2011 Canadian federal election: Simcoe North
Party	Candidate	Votes	%	±%	Expenditures
Conservative	Bruce Stanton	31,581	54.5	+4.8	–
New Democratic	Richard Banigan	11,515	19.9	+8.2	–
Liberal	Steve Clarke	11,090	19.1	-8.6	–
Green	Valerie Powell	3,489	6.0	-5.0	–
Christian Heritage	Adrian Kooger	322	0.6	–	–
Total valid votes/Expense limit		57,997	100.0		
Total rejected ballots		161	0.3	–	
Turnout		58,158	64.9	–	
Eligible voters		89,588	–	–	
Conservative hold		Swing		-1.7	

2008 Canadian federal election
Party	Candidate	Votes	%	±%	Expenditures
Conservative	Bruce Stanton	26,328	49.7	+9.3	$84,616
Liberal	Steve Clarke	14,670	27.7	-10.7	$87,766
New Democratic	Richard Banigan	6,207	11.7	-2.4	$6,265
Green	Valerie Powell	5,820	11.0	+5.0	$26,424
Total valid votes/Expense limit		53,025	100.0	$90,754	

Note: Results are preliminary as of 18 October 2008.

2006 Canadian federal election
Party	Candidate	Votes	%	±%
Conservative	Bruce Stanton	23,266	40.4	+2.7
Liberal	Karen Graham	22,078	38.4	-5.0
New Democratic	Jen Hill	8,132	14.1	+2.8
Green	Sandy Agnew	3,451	6.0	-0.4
Christian Heritage	Adrian Kooger	617	1.1	+0.1
Total valid votes		57,544	100.0	

2004 Canadian federal election
Party	Candidate	Votes	%	±%
Liberal	Paul Devillers	23,664	43.4	-7.4
Conservative	Peter Stock	20,570	37.7	-6.2
New Democratic	Jen Hill	6,162	11.3	+6.6
Green	Mary Lou Kirby	3,486	6.4	
Christian Heritage	Adrian Kooger	544	1.0	+0.4
Canadian Action	Ian Woods	145	0.3	
Total valid votes		54,571	100.0	

Note: Conservative vote is compared to the total of the Canadian Alliance vote and Progressive Conservative vote in 2000 election.

2000 Canadian federal election
Party	Candidate	Votes	%	±%
Liberal	Paul Devillers	24,510	50.8	+6.4
Alliance	Peter Stock	14,283	29.6	+1.6
Progressive Conservative	Lucy Stewart	6,914	14.3	-6.8
New Democratic	Ann Billings	2,272	4.7	-0.1
Independent	Adrian P. Kooger	305	0.6	
Total valid votes		48,284	100.0	

Note: Canadian Alliance vote is compared to the Reform vote in 1997 election.

1997 Canadian federal election
Party	Candidate	Votes	%	±%
Liberal	Paul Devillers	22,775	44.4	+3.9
Reform	Peter Stock	14,363	28.0	-2.8
Progressive Conservative	Sharon Henry	10,849	21.1	-2.0
New Democratic	Ann Billings	2,488	4.8	+1.4
Green	Adam Mazzara	388	0.8	
Natural Law	Peter Cameron	230	0.4	-0.1
Canadian Action	Gloria Earl	213	0.4	
Total valid votes		51,306	100.0	

1993 Canadian federal election
Party	Candidate	Votes	%	±%
Liberal	Paul Devillers	23,047	40.5	+2.7
Reform	Ray Lyons	17,498	30.8	
Progressive Conservative	Doug Lewis	13,145	23.1	-20.9
New Democratic	Marsha Mitzak	1,958	3.4	-14.7
National	Brian Stewart	845	1.5	
Natural Law	Garry Foster	300	0.5	
Abolitionist	Bobby-Joe Edwards	67	0.1	
Total valid votes		56,860	100.0	

1988 Canadian federal election
Party	Candidate	Votes	%	±%
Progressive Conservative	Doug Lewis	21,847	44.0	-10.9
Liberal	Alan Martin	18,755	37.8	+11.2
New Democratic	Mike McMurter	8,995	18.1	+1.0
Total valid votes		49,597	100.0	

1984 Canadian federal election
Party	Candidate	Votes	%	±%
Progressive Conservative	Doug Lewis	24,887	55.0	+18.5
Liberal	Alan Martin	12,062	26.6	-9.6
New Democratic	Tim Tynan	7,742	17.1	-10.2
Green	John Brandon Letts	362	0.8	
Libertarian	Ian Mcteer	229	0.5	
Total valid votes		45,282	100.0	

1980 Canadian federal election
Party	Candidate	Votes	%	±%
Progressive Conservative	Doug Lewis	14,874	36.4	-10.0
Liberal	Alan Martin	14,808	36.3	+9.7
New Democratic	Fayne Bullen	11,139	27.3	+0.3
Total valid votes		40,821	100.0	

1979 Canadian federal election
Party	Candidate	Votes	%	±%
Progressive Conservative	Doug Lewis	19,388	46.4	+6.2
New Democratic	Fayne Bullen	11,284	27.0	+4.7
Liberal	Walter Connell	11,099	26.6	+4.3
Total valid votes		41,771	100.0	

1974 Canadian federal election
Party	Candidate	Votes	%	±%
Progressive Conservative	P.B. Rynard	18,950	40.2	-7.7
Liberal	Janice Laking	17,068	36.2	+3.7
New Democratic	Fayne Bullen	10,502	22.3	+2.8
Independent	Stephen Ridley	330	0.7	
Social Credit	Bruce Arnold	267	0.6	
Total valid votes		47,117	100.0	

1972 Canadian federal election
Party	Candidate	Votes	%	±%
Progressive Conservative	P.B. Rynard	22,145	47.9	+2.1
Liberal	Bruce Owen	15,038	32.6	-8.6
New Democratic	Rich Partridge	9,016	19.5	+6.5
Total valid votes		46,199	100.0	

1968 Canadian federal election
Party	Candidate	Votes	%	±%
Progressive Conservative	P.B. Rynard	16,619	45.8	+0.3
Liberal	Bill A. Bell	14,936	41.2	0.0
New Democratic	Charles Perrie Rintoul	4,730	13.0	+5.0
Total valid votes		36,285	100.0	

1965 Canadian federal election
Party	Candidate	Votes	%	±%
Progressive Conservative	Heber Smith	9,513	45.5	-0.4
Liberal	Bill Bell	8,590	41.1	+3.3
New Democratic	Ed Genge	1,677	8.0	-0.8
Social Credit	Mel Rowat	1,109	5.3	-3.6
Total valid votes		20,889	100.0	

1963 Canadian federal election
Party	Candidate	Votes	%	±%
Progressive Conservative	Heber Smith	10,157	45.9	-12.2
Liberal	Ralph Snelgrove	8,374	37.8	+7.1
Social Credit	Williard Kinzie	1,961	8.9	-2.4
New Democratic	Russell Pogue	963	4.4	
Independent Conservative	Jack Browne	678	3.1	
Total valid votes		22,133	100.0	

1962 Canadian federal election
Party	Candidate	Votes	%	±%
Progressive Conservative	Heber Smith	11,728	58.1	-12.1
Liberal	Hank Howard	6,210	30.7	+0.9
New Democratic	Russell Pogue	2,265	11.2	
Total valid votes		20,203	100.0	

1958 Canadian federal election
Party	Candidate	Votes	%	±%
Progressive Conservative	Heber Smith	13,855	70.2	+7.7
Liberal	William S. Campbell	5,890	29.8	-7.7
Total valid votes		19,745	100.0	

1957 Canadian federal election
Party	Candidate	Votes	%	±%
Progressive Conservative	Heber Smith	11,437	62.5	+10.9
Liberal	William Seymour Campbell	6,860	37.5	-10.9
Total valid votes		18,297	100.0	

1953 Canadian federal election
Party	Candidate	Votes	%	±%
Progressive Conservative	Julian Harcourt Ferguson	8,316	51.6	+1.6
Liberal	Ralph Trapnell Snelgrove	7,796	48.4	+5.2
Total valid votes		16,112	100.0	

1949 Canadian federal election
Party	Candidate	Votes	%	±%
Progressive Conservative	Julian Harcourt Ferguson	7,658	50.0	-3.0
Liberal	J. Gladstone Currie	6,613	43.2	+2.7
Co-operative Commonwealth	Reginald Edward Ayres	1,053	6.9	+0.3
Total valid votes		15,324	100.0	

1945 Canadian federal election
Party	Candidate	Votes	%	±%
Progressive Conservative	Julian Harcourt Ferguson	8,251	52.9	+7.0
Liberal	Duncan Fletcher McCuaig	6,309	40.5	-13.6
Co-operative Commonwealth	Arthur Eric Cresswell	1,027	6.6	
Total valid votes		15,587	100.0	

Note: Progressive Conservative vote is compared to "National Government" vote in 1940 election.

1940 Canadian federal election
Party	Candidate	Votes	%	±%
Liberal	Duncan Fletcher McCuaig	7,096	54.1	+4.0
National Government	Frederick Aylsworth Brock	6,030	45.9	+9.4
Total valid votes		13,126	100.0	

Note: "National Government" vote is compared to Conservative vote in 1935 election.

1935 Canadian federal election
Party	Candidate	Votes	%	±%
Liberal	Duncan Fletcher McCuaig	7,244	50.1	
Conservative	John Thomas Simpson	5,290	36.6	-16.5
Reconstruction	Herbert James Crawford	1,324	9.2	
Co-operative Commonwealth	Seymour Cornwall Cooper	608	4.2	
Total valid votes		14,466	100.0	

1930 Canadian federal election
Party	Candidate	Votes	%	±%
Conservative	John Thomas Simpson	7,295	53.0	+2.3
Progressive	Ernest Charles Drury	6,459	47.0	-2.3
Total valid votes		13,754	100.0	

1926 Canadian federal election
Party	Candidate	Votes	%	±%
Conservative	William Alves Boys	7,058	50.7	-1.5
Progressive	Ernest Charles Drury	6,865	49.3	+1.5
Total valid votes		13,923	100.0	

1925 Canadian federal election
Party	Candidate	Votes	%	±%
Conservative	William Alves Boys	6,885	52.2	+8.7
Progressive	Ernest Drury	6,295	47.8	-3.6
Total valid votes		13,180	100.0	

1921 Canadian federal election
Party	Candidate	Votes	%	±%
Progressive	Thomas Edwin Ross	5,298	51.4	
Conservative	John Allister Currie	4,489	43.5	-21.4
Independent	William John Holden	527	5.1	
Total valid votes		10,314	100.0	

Note: Conservative vote is compared to Government vote in 1917 election.

1917 Canadian federal election
Party	Candidate	Votes	%	±%
Government (Unionist)	John Allister Currie	4,240	64.9	+13.2
Opposition (Laurier Liberals)	Ernest Drury	2,293	35.1	-13.2
Total valid votes		6,533	100.0	

Note: Government vote is compared to Conservative vote in 1911 election, and Opposition vote is compared to Liberal vote.

1911 Canadian federal election
Party	Candidate	Votes	%	±%
Conservative	John Allister Currie	2,648	51.7	+1.2
Liberal	Leighton Goldie McCarthy	2,476	48.3	-1.2
Total valid votes		5,124	100.0	

1908 Canadian federal election
Party	Candidate	Votes	%	±%
Conservative	John Allister Currie	2,756	50.5	+0.9
Liberal	Daniel Wilson	2,705	49.5	
Total valid votes		5,461	100.0	

1904 Canadian federal election
Party	Candidate	Votes	%	±%
Independent	Leighton Goldie McCarthy	2,486	50.4	-6.2
Conservative	John Allister Currie	2,444	49.6	+6.2
Total valid votes		4,930	100.0	

1900 Canadian federal election
Party	Candidate	Votes	%	±%
Independent	Leighton Goldie McCarthy	2,524	56.6	
Conservative	Charles Cameron	1,936	43.4	+25.2
Total valid votes		4,460	100.0	

Note: popular vote compared to vote in 1896 general election.

By-election on 14 December 1898 On Mr. McCarthy's death, 11 May 1898
Party	Candidate	Votes
Independent	Leighton Goldie McCarthy	elected

1896 Canadian federal election
Party	Candidate	Votes	%	±%
McCarthyite	Dalton McCarthy	2,517	52.4	-0.8
Liberal	Elihu Stewart	1,410	29.4	-17.4
Conservative	Houghton Lennox	875	18.2	
Total valid votes		4,802	100.0	

1891 Canadian federal election
Party	Candidate	Votes	%	±%
Independent	Dalton McCarthy	2,417	53.3	-0.4
Liberal	Herman Henry Cook	2,121	46.7	+0.5
Total valid votes		4,538	100.0	

1887 Canadian federal election
Party	Candidate	Votes	%	±%
Conservative	Dalton McCarthy	2,362	53.7	-0.1
Liberal	Timothy Warren Anglin	2,033	46.3	
Total valid votes		4,395	100.0	

1882 Canadian federal election
Party	Candidate	Votes	%	±%
Conservative	Dalton McCarthy	1,761	53.8	+3.4
Independent	Charles Drury	1,511	46.2	
Total valid votes		3,272	100.0	

1878 Canadian federal election
Party	Candidate	Votes	%	±%
Conservative	Dalton McCarthy	2,943	50.4	+1.2
Liberal	Herman Henry Cook	2,893	49.6	-1.2
Total valid votes		5,836	100.0	

Canadian federal by-election, 26 December 1874
Party	Candidate	Votes	%	±%
On Mr. Cook being unseated on petition, 11 November 1874
Liberal	Herman Henry Cook	2,355	50.8	-1.0
Conservative	Dalton McCarthy	2,281	49.2	+1.0
Total valid votes		4,636	100.0	

1874 Canadian federal election
Party	Candidate	Votes	%	±%
Liberal	Herman Henry Cook	2,279	51.7	+1.0
Conservative	Dalton McCarthy	2,125	48.3	-1.0
Total valid votes		4,404	100.0	

1872 Canadian federal election
Party	Candidate	Votes	%
Liberal	Herman Henry Cook	1,908	50.7
Conservative	Dalton McCarthy	1,852	49.3
Total valid votes		3,760	100.0

1867 Canadian federal election
Party	Candidate	Votes
Liberal	Thomas David McConkey	acclaimed

== See also ==
- List of Canadian electoral districts
- Historical federal electoral districts of Canada
