= Paul DeVillers =

Canadian politician

Paul J. DeVillers, PC (born March 11, 1946) is a former Canadian politician. He served as Member of Parliament for the Ontario riding of Simcoe North from 1993 to 2005.

He was first elected to parliament for the Liberal Party of Canada in the 1993 Canadian federal election and re-elected in 1997, 2000, and 2004 before retiring from office prior to the 2006 election.

He has served as a member of the House of Commons Standing Committee on Aboriginal Affairs and Northern Development, the Standing Joint Committee on Scrutiny of Regulations, and the House of Commons Standing Committee on the Environment. He chaired the House of Commons Standing Committee on Justice and Human Rights, the Justice Subcommittee that reviewed the Corrections and Conditional Release Act (CCRA), the Justice Subcommittee on Organized Crime. In February 1996 he was named parliamentary secretary to Stéphane Dion, then Minister for Intergovernmental Affairs. In 1999 he was elected National Caucus chair. In January 2002 he was appointed Secretary of State (Amateur Sport) and Deputy Leader of the Government in the House of Commons.

Before entering politics, he studied at the University of Ottawa and practised municipal law.

26th Ministry – Cabinet of Jean Chrétien
Sub-Cabinet Post
Predecessor	Title	Successor
	Secretary of State (Physical Activity and Sport) (2002–2003)	
Special Parliamentary Responsibilities
Predecessor	Title	Successor
Alfonso Gagliano	Deputy Leader of the Government in the House of Commons; 2002–2003	Mauril Bélanger
Parliament of Canada
Preceded by Doug Lewis	Member of Parliament for Simcoe North; 1993–2006	Succeeded by Bruce Stanton
