= SS Midland City =

Canadian passenger and cargo vessel on the Great Lakes

Coordinates: 44.7523°N 79.8505°W

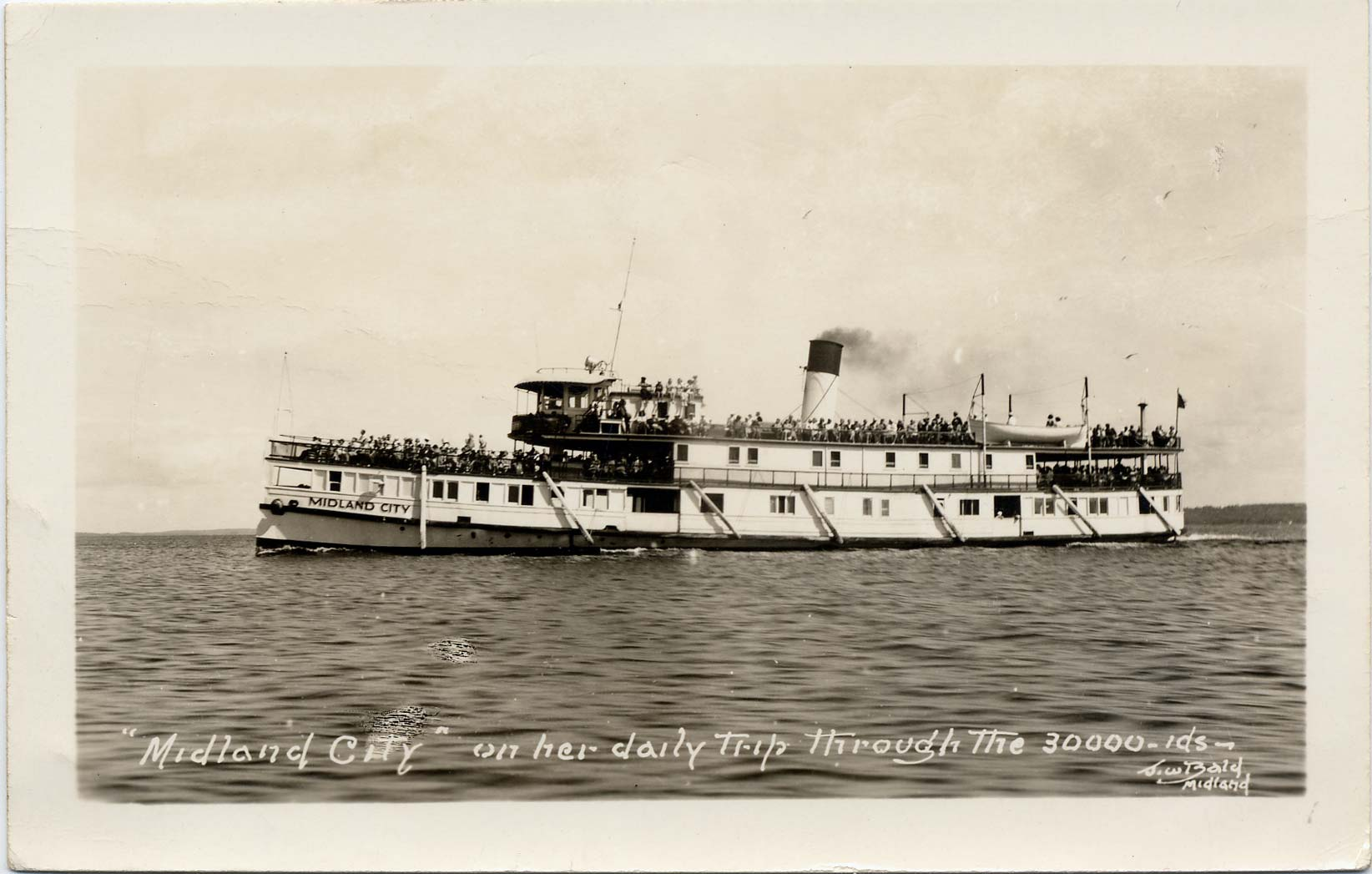
- SS Midland City on Georgian Bay

History
- Name: Maud (1871–1895); America (1895–1921); Midland City (1921–)
- Namesake: Maud Gildersleeve
- Owner: C.F. Gildersleeve (1871–1873); W. Nickle (1873–1886); St. Lawrence River Steamboats Co (1886–)
- Launched: 16 August 1871
- Sponsored by: Maud Gildersleeve
- Completed: August 1871
- Fate: Grounded and burned as breakwater 1955

General characteristics 1871–1895
- Type: Steamboat
- Tonnage: 120–133 tons registered; 293 GRT
- Length: 114 ft (35 m)
- Beam: 19 ft (5.8 m) (hull); 32 ft (9.8 m) (overall)
- Draft: 3 ft (0.91 m)
- Depth: 6 ft (1.8 m)
- Installed power: 200 hp (150 kW) Compound steam engine
- Propulsion: 13 ft (4.0 m) sidewheels
- Speed: 13 miles per hour (21 km/h)
- Capacity: 550 passengers

General characteristics 1895–1922
- Tonnage: 266 tons; 521 GT
- Length: 153 ft (47 m)
- Beam: 35 ft (11 m)

General characteristics 1922–1933
- Tonnage: 580 GT

General characteristics 1933–
- Tonnage: 580 GT
- Installed power: 300 hp (220 kW) diesel

SS Midland City was originally a Canadian side-wheel steamboat that provided passenger and cargo transportation on the Great Lakes from 1871 until 1955. Originally named Maud, then America, she underwent several extensive refits over her 84-year service, and saw several owners. The ship was intentionally run aground and burnt to the waterline in 1955 near the mouth of the Wye River in Midland Bay. The wreck is intact and visible above the water to this day, where it acts as a breakwater for the Wye Heritage Marina and local attraction.

== History ==
=== Maud ===
Midland City was originally built as a ferry named Maud (occasionally Maude). She was pre-fabricated at Glasgow in Scotland, disassembled, and shipped across the Atlantic in pieces that were reunited in Kingston This original vessel was 114 feet (35 m) long, 19 feet (5.8 m) wide with a depth of hold of 6 feet (1.8 m), drawing about 3 feet (0.91 m) of water. Her side-mounted paddle wheels and 200 hp (150 kW) engine gave the original ship a top speed estimated at 13 miles per hour (21 km/h). Her tonnage was variously stated as between 120 and 133 tons reg. (293 tons gross). She was built with a steel-reinforced timber hull over an iron frame. Her capacity is listed as 550 passengers.

Assembled by the Gildersleeves (a shipbuilding family and political dynasty) and completed August 1871, Maud was originally intended to provide passenger and cargo service between Picton and Belleville, Ontario under the command of Captain W. Swales. She was valued at $20,000 and sold to a W. Nickle, Esq. of Kingston in January 1873. Both Swales and Nickle (or Nichol) were involved in the construction of the ship, according to a report from the day of her launch.

=== America ===
In 1886, the vessel was sold to the St. Lawrence River Steamboats Co. of Kingston. In 1895 she was refitted and enlarged, now 153 feet long, 35 feet in breadth and 266 tons (521 tons gross). Re-named America, she provided passenger service on Lake Ontario for many years before being refitted again in 1921, and once more in 1933.

=== Georgian Bay Tourist Company ===
After the close of the 1920 navigation season, Northern Navigation Company announced they intended to discontinue their steamship service between Midland and Parry Sound, leaving Midland businessmen to find a replacement for the popular excursion steamer route. To deal with the tourist traffic in the southern Georgian Bay region, the Georgian Bay Tourist Company and the Honey Harbour Navigation Company were organized. The original intention of the company was to have a ship capable of carrying 400 passengers to leave Midland daily, on the arrival of a new G.T.R. train, running to San Souci and returning to Midland the next day, connecting with the train. The Grand Trunk Railway company was brought on board with the plan. A second steamboat was required to convey passengers among the Honey Harbour Islands.

=== Midland City ===
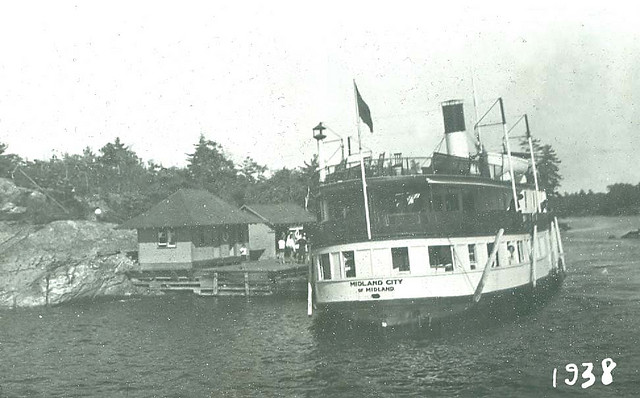
Docked at Go Home Bay, 1938

America was renamed SS Midland City in 1921, before a 1922 rebuild in Kingston that saw her weight increase to 580 tons gross. Among the changes made during this refit was the installation of a bay to carry two cars. She was then brought to Georgian Bay where the steamer ran a regular route from Midland to Parry Sound, stopping in Honey Harbour, Minnicog, Whalen's, Go-Home-Bay, Wah-Wah-Taysee, Manitou, Copperhead, Sans Souci, and Rose Point.

The 1933 refit was the most extensive, replacing the steam engine with a new 300 hp diesel motor. She was accidentally beached at Watcher's Reef on 26 August 1934, but suffered no damage. The ship continued to act as a ferry on Georgian Bay until 1955.

== Wreck ==
In 1955, Midland City's 84th year afloat, she was intentionally grounded at the mouth of the Wye River, where the Wye Marsh empties into Midland Bay. The ship was intentionally burned.

The wreck served as a local attraction for snorkeling and diving before eventually being filled and connected to the shore, forming a breakwater for an entrance to the Wye Heritage Marina. Though lowering water levels in Georgian Bay have since exposed part of the wooden sides of the ship, it has slowly been forgotten, and few locals remember its presence.

Today the wreck is clearly visible from satellite imagery, as a short pier pointing to the Northwest immediately North of the Wye Heritage Marina. The shape of her stern is immediately apparent, while her bow is concealed by the boulders connecting the breakwater to shore. While covered by vegetation and filled with rocks, the hull is relatively intact. Debris can be seen in a long trail on the lake bottom where the ship was run aground.
