= William Alves Boys =

Canadian politician

William Alves Boys KC
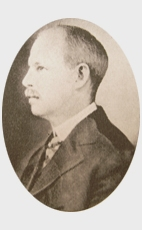

Member of the Canadian Parliament for Simcoe South
- In office 1912–1925
- Preceded by: Haughton Lennox
- Succeeded by: The electoral district was abolished in 1924.

Member of the Canadian Parliament for Simcoe North
- In office 1925–1930
- Preceded by: Thomas Edwin Ross
- Succeeded by: John Thomas Simpson

Personal details
- Born: July 9, 1868 Barrie, Ontario, Canada
- Died: February 20, 1939 (aged 70)
- Party: Conservative Party (1912-1930); Unionist Party (1917-1921)
- Occupation: barrister
- Portfolio: Chief Government Whip (1926); Whip of the Conservative Party (1921-1926)

William Alves Boys, KC (July 9, 1868 – February 20, 1938) was a Canadian politician and barrister.

Born in Barrie, Ontario, he was mayor of Barrie between 1902 and 1904 and commissioner of Simcoe County, Ontario between 1905 and 1906. He was elected to the House of Commons of Canada in a 1912 by-election as a Member of the Conservative Party to represent the riding of Simcoe South. He was re-elected in 1917 and 1921 then re-elected in the riding of Simcoe North in 1925 and 1926. He was the Whip of the Conservative Party (1921–1926) then Chief Government Whip in 1926. During the 16th Parliament, he was a member of the Special Joint Committee appointed on claims of the allied Indian tribes of British Columbia.

== Election results ==
=== Simcoe South ===
Canadian federal by-election, 1912
Party	Candidate	Votes
Conservative	William Alves Boys	Acclaimed

1917 Canadian federal election
Party	Candidate	Votes
Government (Unionist)	William Alves Boys	5,771
Opposition (Laurier Liberals)	John Henry Mitchell	1,157

1921 Canadian federal election
Party	Candidate	Votes
Conservative	William Alves Boys	6,509
Progressive	Compton Barker Jeffs	4,758

=== Simcoe North ===
1925 Canadian federal election
Party	Candidate	Votes	%	±%
Conservative	William Alves Boys	6,885	52.2	+8.7
Progressive	Ernest Drury	6,295	47.8	-3.6
Total valid votes		13,180	100.0	

1926 Canadian federal election
Party	Candidate	Votes	%	±%
Conservative	William Alves Boys	7,058	50.7	-1.5
Progressive	Ernest Charles Drury	6,865	49.3	+1.5
Total valid votes		13,923	100.0	
