= Awenda Provincial Park =

Provincial park in Ontario, Canada

- IUCN category II (national park)
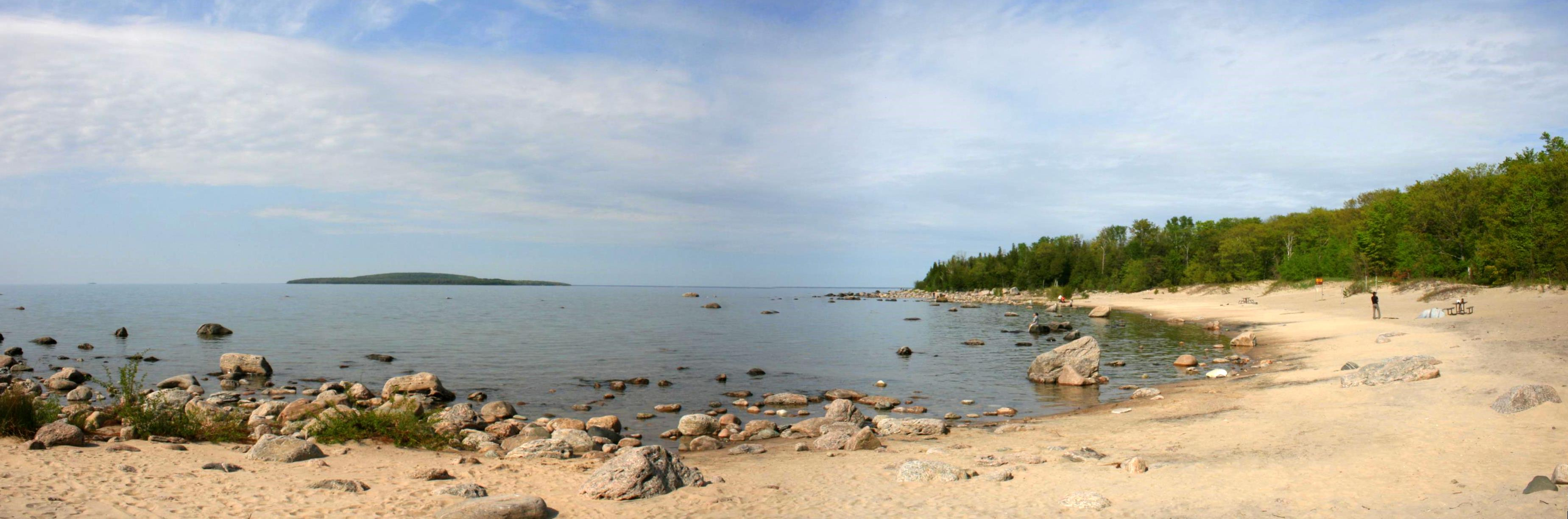
- Georgian Bay panorama at Awenda

- Location within Southern Ontario
- Interactive map of Awenda Provincial Park
- Location: Simcoe County, Ontario, Canada
- Nearest town: Penetanguishene
- Coordinates: 44°50′29″N 79°59′33″W
- Area: 2,915 ha (11.25 sq mi)
- Established: 1975
- Visitors: 175,593 (in 2022)
- Governing body: Ontario Parks
- Website: www.ontarioparks.com/park/awenda

Awenda Provincial Park is a provincial park in Tiny Township, Simcoe County in Central Ontario, Canada, located on a peninsula jutting into Georgian Bay north of Penetanguishene. The park occupies an area of 2,915 hectares (7,200 acres) and was established in 1975. It is classified as a Natural Environment Park and therefore all land is protected.

Giants Tomb Island, located in southern Georgian Bay approximately 3 kilometres (1.9 mi) from the mainland and the majority of the island is part of the park. On the island, no overnight camping is allowed, and no facilities are provided.

Recreational activities at Awenda include camping, swimming, canoeing and hiking. Geological features include the Nipissing Bluff and a kettle lake formed during the retreat of the glaciers at the end of the most recent ice age. The shoreline consists of a series of sand, cobble, and boulder beaches.

Much of this area was logged around the beginning of the 20th century, so most of the mature deciduous forests here are actually second growth. Although dominated by mature deciduous forest, the park has a diversity of habitats, including: bogs, fens, coastal meadow marshes, dunes and pine oak savanna. It supports a rich variety of plant and animal life -including 32 species of amphibians and reptiles.

== Park information ==
The park contains 6 public campgrounds with approximately 330 sites available and 3 group camping sites. The park includes 5 beaches.

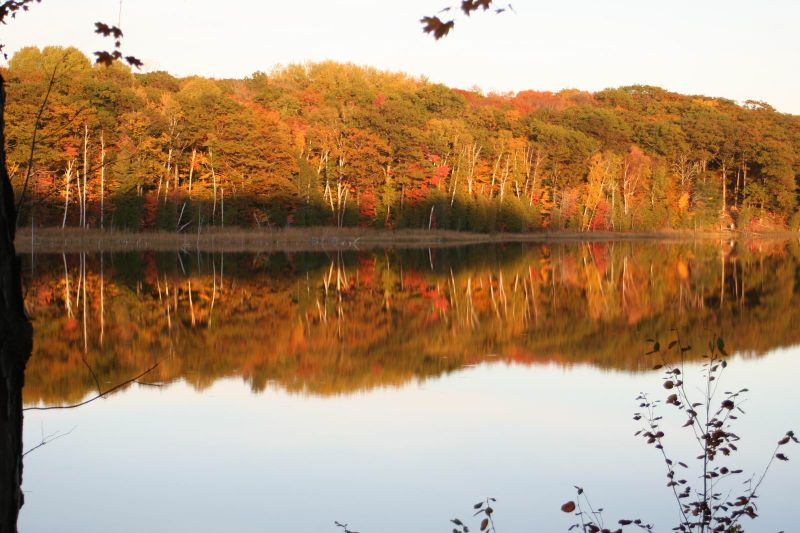
Kettle Lake

The park also has over 30 kilometres (19 mi) of hiking trails, with a variety of shorter and longer trails. These include the:

- Robitaille Homestead Trail (3 kilometres (1.9 mi) return), a trail which takes walkers to an ancient dune system. The age of these sand dunes has been estimated at 11,500 years, from the time of the last glacial retreat. The dunes are a very fragile environment and it is prohibited to climb the hillside, stand on the edge of the bluff or climb down the bluff. The purpose is to allow plants to reestablish themselves and to preserve this area for future park visitors.
- Wendat Trail (Loop 5 kilometres (3.1 mi)), a trail which wraps around Kettle Lake following closely on sections of the shore. An area for wildlife viewing, specifically for birds such as the blue heron, loons, and small birds. A built boardwalk brings visitors over the wetlands.
