= Thomas Edwin Ross =

Canadian politician

Member of Parliament for Simcoe North
- In office December 1921 – September 1925
- Preceded by: John Allister Currie
- Succeeded by: William Alves Boys

Personal details
- Born: Thomas Edwin Ross; 11 May 1873 Oro, Ontario, Canada
- Died: 19 January 1951 (aged 77)
- Party: Progressive
- Profession: Farmer

Thomas Edwin Ross (11 May 1873 – 19 January 1951) was a Progressive party member of the House of Commons of Canada. He was born in Oro, Ontario and became a farmer.

He was elected to Parliament at the Simcoe North riding in the 1921 general election. After completing his only federal term, the 14th Canadian Parliament, Ross left the House of Commons and did not seek another term in the 1925 federal election.
