= Bruce Stanton =

Canadian politician

Deputy Speaker of the Canadian House of Commons
- In office December 4, 2015 – September 20, 2021
- Monarch: Elizabeth II
- Governors General: David Johnston; Julie Payette
- Prime Minister: Justin Trudeau
- Preceded by: Joe Comartin
- Succeeded by: Chris d'Entremont

Member of Parliament for Simcoe North
- In office January 23, 2006 – September 20, 2021
- Preceded by: Paul Devillers
- Succeeded by: Adam Chambers

Chair of the Standing Committee on Aboriginal Affairs
- In office 3 February 2009 – 22 June 2011
- Minister: Chuck Strahl; John Duncan
- Preceded by: Barry Devolin
- Succeeded by: Chris Warkentin

Personal details
- Born: Ronald Bruce Stanton; December 20, 1957 (age 68) Orillia, Ontario, Canada
- Party: Conservative
- Spouse: Heather Stanton
- Profession: tourism professional

Ronald Bruce Stanton (born December 20, 1957) is a retired Canadian politician who served as Member of Parliament for the riding of Simcoe North from 2006 to 2021. Stanton first ran as a member of the Conservative Party in the 2006 federal election and won with 40.44% of the vote. He was re-elected in 2008, obtaining 49.7% of the vote. He won again in 2011 with 54.44% of the vote. He was re-elected again in the 2015 federal election. He was named the 49th Deputy Speaker of the House of Commons on December 4, 2015, serving in this position in the 42nd Canadian Parliament and 43rd Canadian Parliament. When the speaker is absent from the House of Commons, the Deputy Speaker is vested with the powers of the Speaker.

Born in Orillia, Ontario, Canada, Stanton ran a family tourism business on Sparrow Lake that had been founded in 1884. He served as a board member of Resorts Ontario, Tourism Ontario, the Board of the Tourism Association of Canada, and the Huronia Tourist Association. For four years, he was a member of the Severn Township municipal council.

On June 25, 2020, Stanton announced that he would not seek re-election for a sixth term as Simcoe North's Member of Parliament in the 2021 Canadian federal election. He was succeeded by Adam Chambers of the Conservative Party.

== Electoral history ==
2019 Canadian federal election: Simcoe North
| Party | Candidate | Votes | % | ±% | Expenditures |
|---|---|---|---|---|---|
| Conservative | Bruce Stanton | 27,241 | 43.4 | -0.12 | $100,103.63 |
| Liberal | Gerry Hawes | 19,310 | 30.8 | -9.01 | $83,974.59 |
| New Democratic | Angelique Belcourt | 8,850 | 14.1 | +3.52 | $4,832.36 |
| Green | Valerie Powell | 5,882 | 9.4 | +4.94 | $6,203.63 |
| People's | Stephen Makk | 1,154 | 1.8 | – | $4,480.03 |
| Christian Heritage | Chris Brown | 341 | 0.5 | -0.06 | $2,923.18 |
| Total valid votes/expense limit | | 62,778 | 100.0 | | |
| Total rejected ballots | | 358 | | | |
| Turnout | | 63,136 | 65.0 | | |
| Eligible voters | | 97,148 | | | |
| Conservative hold | | Swing | | +4.45 | |
Source: Elections Canada

2015 Canadian federal election
| Party | Candidate | Votes | % | ±% | Expenditures |
|---|---|---|---|---|---|
| Conservative | Bruce Stanton | 24,836 | 43.52 | -10.36 | $91,741.02 |
| Liberal | Liz Riley | 22,718 | 39.81 | +20.56 | $74,044.17 |
| New Democratic | Richard Banigan | 6,037 | 10.58 | -9.85 | $3,879.75 |
| Green | Peter Stubbins | 2,543 | 4.46 | -1.4 | $11,996.03 |
| No affiliation^{1} | Jacob Kearey-Moreland | 618 | 1.08 | – | $2,744.47 |
| Christian Heritage | Scott Whittaker | 319 | 0.56 | -0.02 | $2,753.34 |
| Total valid votes/Expense limit | | 57,071 | 100.0 | | $224,845.90 |
| Total rejected ballots | | 189 | – | – | |
| Turnout | | 57,260 | – | – | |
| Eligible voters | | 86,859 | | | |
| Conservative hold | | Swing | | -15.46 | |
Source: Elections Canada^{1} Cooperative Interdependent

2011 federal election redistributed results
| Party | Vote | % |
|---|---|---|
| Conservative | 27,796 | 53.88 |
| New Democratic | 10,540 | 20.43 |
| Liberal | 9,932 | 19.25 |
| Green | 3,021 | 5.86 |
| Christian Heritage | 301 | 0.58 |

2011 Canadian federal election
| Party | Candidate | Votes | % | ±% | Expenditures |
|---|---|---|---|---|---|
| Conservative | Bruce Stanton | 31,581 | 54.5 | +4.8 | – |
| New Democratic | Richard Banigan | 11,515 | 19.9 | +8.2 | – |
| Liberal | Steve Clarke | 11,090 | 19.1 | -8.6 | – |
| Green | Valerie Powell | 3,489 | 6.0 | -5.0 | – |
| Christian Heritage | Adrian Kooger | 322 | 0.6 | – | – |
| Total valid votes/Expense limit | | 57,997 | 100.0 | | |
| Total rejected ballots | | 161 | 0.3 | – | |
| Turnout | | 58,158 | 64.9 | – | |
| Eligible voters | | 89,588 | – | – | |

2008 Canadian federal election
| Party | Candidate | Votes | % | ±% | Expenditures |
|---|---|---|---|---|---|
| Conservative | Bruce Stanton | 26,328 | 49.7 | +9.3 | $84,616 |
| Liberal | Steve Clarke | 14,670 | 27.7 | -10.7 | $87,766 |
| New Democratic | Richard Banigan | 6,207 | 11.7 | -2.4 | $6,265 |
| Green | Valerie Powell | 5,820 | 11.0 | +5.0 | $26,424 |
| Total valid votes/Expense limit | | 53,025 | 100.0 | $90,754 | |

2006 Canadian federal election
| Party | Candidate | Votes | % | ±% |
|---|---|---|---|---|
| Conservative | Bruce Stanton | 23,266 | 40.4 | +2.7 |
| Liberal | Karen Graham | 22,078 | 38.4 | -5.0 |
| New Democratic | Jen Hill | 8,132 | 14.1 | +2.8 |
| Green | Sandy Agnew | 3,451 | 6.0 | -0.4 |
| Christian Heritage | Adrian Kooger | 617 | 1.1 | +0.1 |
| Total valid votes | | 57,544 | 100.0 | |
