= Ronald Stewart =

Canadian businessman and politician (1927–2022)

Member of the Canadian Parliament for Simcoe South
- In office October 9, 1979 – October 1, 1988
- Preceded by: Riding created
- Succeeded by: Riding dissolved

Personal details
- Born: Ronald Alexander Stewart; April 13, 1927 Beeton, Ontario, Canada
- Died: January 10, 2022 (aged 94) Barrie, Ontario, Canada
- Party: Progressive Conservative
- Occupation: Businessman

Ronald Alexander Stewart (April 13, 1927 – January 10, 2022) was a Canadian businessman and politician. He served as a Member of Parliament (MP) from 1979 to 1988, representing Simcoe South for the Progressive Conservative Party of Canada.

== Early life ==
Stewart was born in Beeton, Ontario, on April 13, 1927. He initially attended Waterloo College, before dropping out in 1948 to help his father with his wholesale business after his business partner died. Under his direction, Stewart Wholesale Company Limited expanded to five locations. Stewart eventually returned to college – now renamed to Wilfrid Laurier University – in 1977 and graduated with a degree in political science at the age of 50.

== Political career ==
Stewart entered federal politics in 1979, running in the election that year for the Progressive Conservative Party of Canada. He was elected to the House of Commons, representing the riding of Simcoe South. As an opposition MP following the 1980 election, he served as assistant critic for Small Business and Tourism. He was responsible for tabling the private member's bill that led to "O Canada" being officially adopted as the country's national anthem. The bill ultimately became the National Anthem Act after receiving royal assent on June 27, 1980, four days before Canada Day.

After the Conservatives regained power in 1984 federal election, Stewart was appointed parliamentary secretary to Minister of Public Works on November 1 that year. He acted in that capacity until October 1986, when he was made parliamentary secretary to the Minister of Supply and Services. During his tenure as an MP, he played a pivotal part in bringing Honda and Volkswagen car plants to his riding, as well as the Mariposa School of Skating. He vigorously opposed a motion tabled by Burnaby MP Svend Robinson in 1986 to allow gay and lesbian Canadians to work in the RCMP and Armed Forces.

Stewart was also of the opinion that federally-provided bilingual services were appropriate where numbers warranted. He and Jack Scowen openly disagreed with their party leader, Prime Minister Brian Mulroney, when the government was supporting efforts to translate Saskatchewan provincial legislation into French. Scowen and Stewart believed such efforts for the province's 23,000 Fransaskois would be expensive and unnecessary. Stewart retired from politics in 1988 and did not seek another term in the following federal election.

== Personal life ==
Stewart was married to Emma Stewart (née Wallwin) until his death. Together, they had four children: Donna, Robert, Julie, and Shane.

After his political career ended, Stewart returned to the business community. He was a member of the Shriners and was also a director of the Royal Order of Jesters. Stewart died at his home in Barrie on January 10, 2022, at the age of 94.
