= Haughton Lennox =

Canadian politician

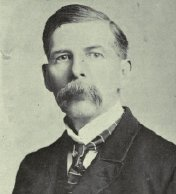

Member of the Canadian Parliament for Simcoe South
- In office 1900–1912
- Preceded by: Richard Tyrwhitt
- Succeeded by: William Alves Boys

Personal details
- Born: February 28, 1850 Innisfil Township, Canada West
- Died: July 26, 1927 (aged 77)
- Party: Conservative

Haughton Lennox (February 28, 1850 – July 26, 1927) was a Canadian politician.

Born in Innisfil Township, Canada West, the son of William Lennox and Maria Haughton, Lennox was educated at the Public and Grammar Schools of Barrie. A lawyer, he was first elected to the House of Commons of Canada for the Ontario electoral district of Simcoe South in the general elections of 1900. A Conservative, he was re-elected in 1904, 1908, and 1911.
