= Adam Chambers (politician) =

Canadian politician (born 1985)

Adam Chambers MP
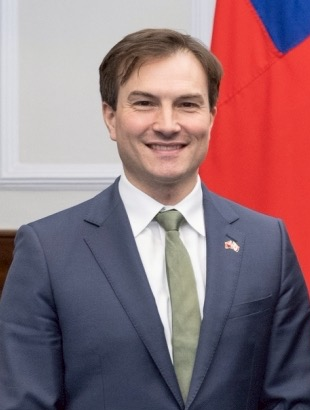
- Adam Chambers in 2026

Member of Parliament for Simcoe North
- Incumbent
- Assumed office September 20, 2021
- Preceded by: Bruce Stanton
Shadow Minister
2026–present	Innovation, Science and Industry
2025–2026	International Trade
2022–2025	National Revenue

Personal details
- Born: March 13, 1985 (age 41) Midland, Ontario, Canada
- Party: Conservative
- Education: University of Western Ontario (BA, JD, MBA)
- Occupation: Politician; lawyer

Adam Chambers MP is a Canadian politician who was elected to represent the riding of Simcoe North in the House of Commons of Canada in the 2021 Canadian federal election.

== Biography ==
Chambers attended St. Theresa's High School in Midland, Ontario and has a law degree and an MBA from the University of Western Ontario. He worked as a senior advisor to Jim Flaherty, in the financial industry and runs an online education business. Chambers is married and has two children.

He was elected vice chair of the Canadian House of Commons Standing Committee on International Trade in the 45th Canadian Parliament in 2025.

At the time of the 2025 Canadian federal election, he lived in Port McNicoll, Ontario.

== Election results ==
2025 Canadian federal election: Simcoe North
Party	Candidate	Votes	%	±%	Expenditures
Conservative	Adam Chambers	32,241	48.41	+6.23	
Liberal	Ryan Rocca	29,767	44.69	+13.86	
New Democratic	Melissa Lloyd	2,508	3.77	–12.19	
Green	Ray Little	1,260	1.89	–1.16	
People's	Stephen Toivo Makk	638	0.96	–6.69	
Christian Heritage	Russ Emo	191	0.29	–0.04	
Total valid votes/expense limit		66,605			
Total rejected ballots		482			
Turnout		67,087	68.86		
Eligible voters		97,424			
Conservative notional hold		Swing		–4.05	
Source: Elections Canada

2021 Canadian federal election: Simcoe North
Party	Candidate	Votes	%	±%	Expenditures
Conservative	Adam Chambers	27,383	43.0	-0.4	$124,130.04
Liberal	Cynthia Wesley-Esquimaux	19,332	30.4	-0.4	$70,369.83
New Democratic	Janet-Lynne Durnford	9,958	15.7	+1.6	$7,481.15
People's	Stephen Makk	4,822	7.6	+5.8	$27,666.23
Green	Krystal Brooks	1,903	3.0	-6.4	$5,982.80
Christian Heritage	Russ Emo	210	0.3	–	$2,585.00
Total valid votes/expense limit		63,608	–	–	$127,623.16
Total rejected ballots		294			
Turnout		63,902	63.18		
Eligible voters		101,144			
Source: Elections Canada
