= Saint Theresa's High School =

High school in Canada

St. Theresa's Catholic High School

Location
- 347 Galloway Blvd. Midland, Ontario, L4R 5B2; Canada; 44.73891°N 79.86983°W

Information
- School type: Separate high school
- Founded: 1958
- School board: Simcoe Muskoka Catholic District School Board
- Principal: Karen McNamara
- Grades: 9 to 12
- Enrollment: 700 (2020)
- Language: English
- Colours: Blue & White
- Mascot: Storm the Thunderwolf
- Team name: St. Theresa's Thunderwolves

St. Theresa's High School is a high school in Midland, Ontario, Canada administered by the Simcoe Muskoka Catholic District School Board. The school serves students from Midland, Penetanguishene, Tay Township, Tiny Township and a portion of Springwater Township (Elmvale). The current enrollment is 700 students from grade 9–12. The current administration consists of principal Karen McNamara and vice principal Theresa Noga-McArthur.

The school was founded by the Grey Nuns in 1958. It has been in its current building since 1992, and has added two additions to the building since then.
