= Tiny Marsh Provincial Wildlife Area =

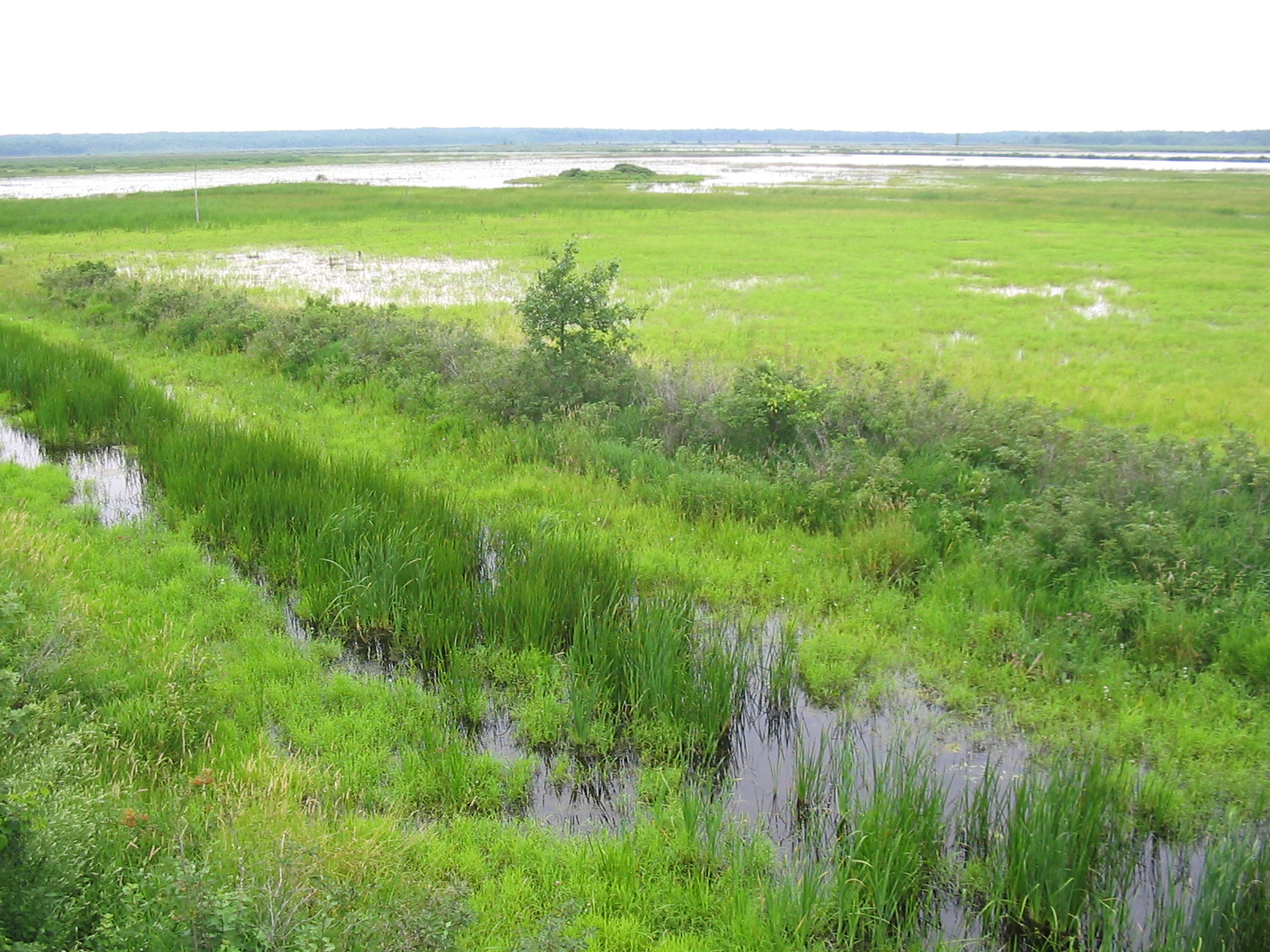
- Tiny Marsh

- Location within Southern Ontario
- Nearest city: Elmvale, Ontario
- Coordinates: 44.606°N 79.938°W
- Area: 8.5 km^{2} (3.3 sq mi)
- Website: www.mtmconservation.org/tiny-marsh-provincial-wildlife-area

The Tiny Marsh Provincial Wildlife Area, located in Simcoe County, Central Ontario, Canada, is Ontario’s first provincially owned and managed wetland and is one of approximately 1200 Important Bird Areas recognized in Canada. The marsh is situated near Elmvale, approximately three kilometres inland from Nottawasaga Bay. Open to visitors year-round, the area consists of 8.5 square kilometres (3.3 sq mi) of marshes, open water, bog, and upland forest. There are 25 kilometres (16 mi) of trails taking visitors to dikes, two observation towers, a marsh viewing mound, and a boardwalk. There is a nature centre, featuring displays of the marsh and its flora and fauna.

Around 250 species of birds have been observed at the marsh, including pied-billed grebe, trumpeter swan, sandhill crane, and the provincially threatened least bitterns and black terns. Ospreys nest at the marsh, as well as 11 species of ducks.

Milksnake, northern watersnake, and red-bellied snake have been observed.
