= Tiny, Ontario =

Tiny
- Township (lower-tier)
- Township of Tiny
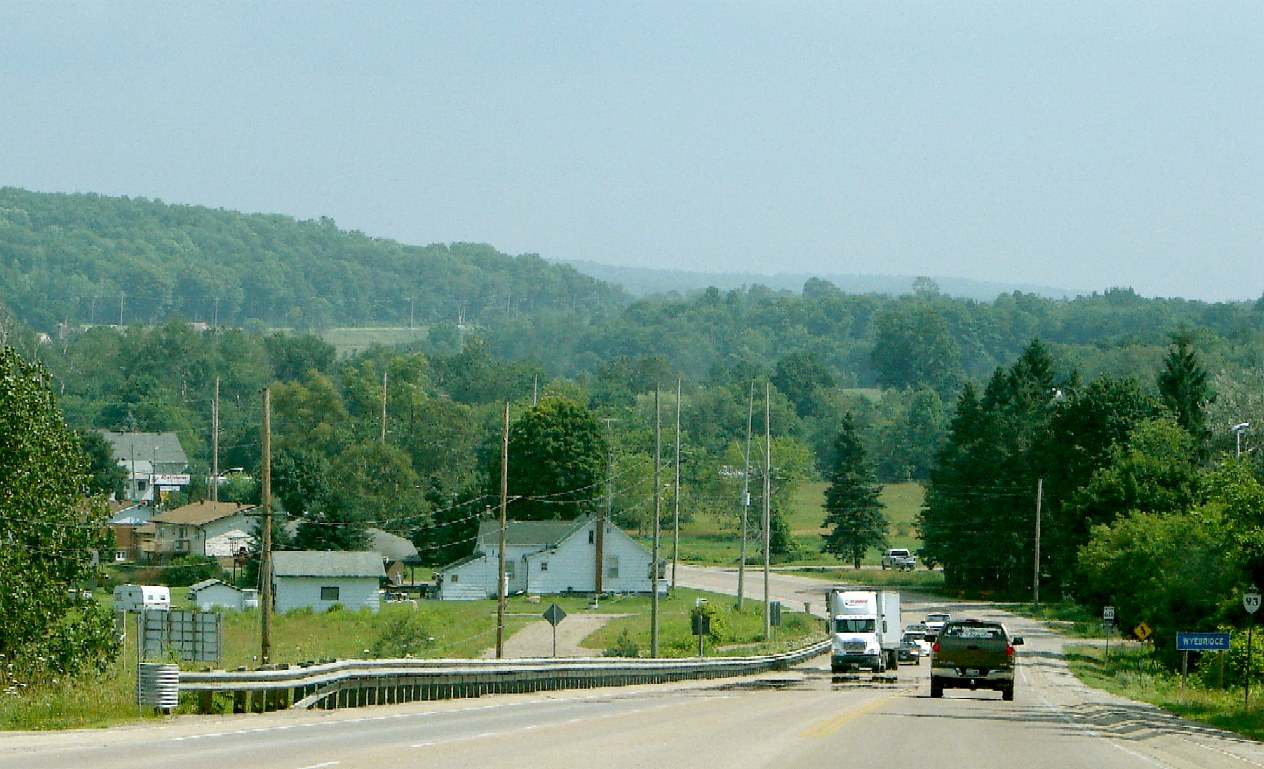
- Wyebridge

- Location within Simcoe County Location within Southern Ontario
- Coordinates: 44°41′N 79°57′W
- Country: Canada
- Province: Ontario
- County: Simcoe
- Settled: 1800s
- Incorporated: January 4, 1869

Government
  - Mayor: David Evans
  - MPs: Adam Chambers
  - MPPs: Jill Dunlop

Area
  - Land: 335.05 km^{2} (129.36 sq mi)

Population (2021)
  - Total: 12,966
  - Density: 38.7/km^{2} (100/sq mi)
- Time zone: UTC-5 (Eastern (EST))
  - Summer (DST): UTC-4 (EDT)
- Postal code FSA: L0L 2J0 & L0L 2T0
- Area codes: 705, 249
- Website: www.tiny.ca

Tiny, also known as Tiny Township, is a township in Simcoe County, south-central Ontario, Canada. The Township of Tiny is in the southern Georgian Bay region and is approximately 30 kilometres (19 mi) long or 410 square kilometres (160 sq mi).

== Geography ==
Tiny Township is located on the peninsula that separates Severn Sound and Nottawasaga Bay at the south end of Georgian Bay, and has a coastline of 70 kilometres (43 mi). It extends southward into the Wye River watershed. The municipality is home to Awenda Provincial Park on Georgian Bay at the north end, and the Tiny Marsh Provincial Wildlife Area, source of the Wye River, in the south.

Tiny contains an artesian well that produces some of the purest spring water in the world. Many residents were concerned that a proposed garbage dump over the aquifer would contaminate the water, and a series of protests achieved a one-year moratorium on the dump. The dump's certificate of approval was later revoked by the province in 2010.

=== Communities ===
The township comprises the communities of:

- Ardmore Beach
- Balm Beach
- Belle-Eau-Claire Beach
- Bluewater Beach
- Cawaja Beach
- Cedar Point
- Clearwater Beach
- Cove Beach
- Crescent Beach
- Coutenac Beach
- Deanlea Beach
- Dorion's Corner
- East Tay Point
- Edmore Beach
- Farlain Lake
- Georgian Bay Estates
- Georgian Heights
- Georgian Highlands
- Georgian Sands Beach
- Georgina Beach
- Gibson
- Ishpiming Beach
- Kettle's Beach
- Kingswood Acres
- Lafontaine
- Lafontaine Beach
- Laurin
- Mary Grove
- Mountain View Beach
- Nottawaga Beach
- Ossossane Beach
- Perkinsfield
- Randolph
- Rowntree Beach
- Sandcastle Beach
- Sandy Bay
- Sawlog Bay
- Silver Birch Beach
- Sloane Point
- Thunder Beach
- Tiny Beach
- Toanche
- Wahnekewaning Beach
- Wendake Beach
- Woodland Beach
- Wyebridge
- Wyevale
- Wymbolwood Beach

==== Lafontaine ====
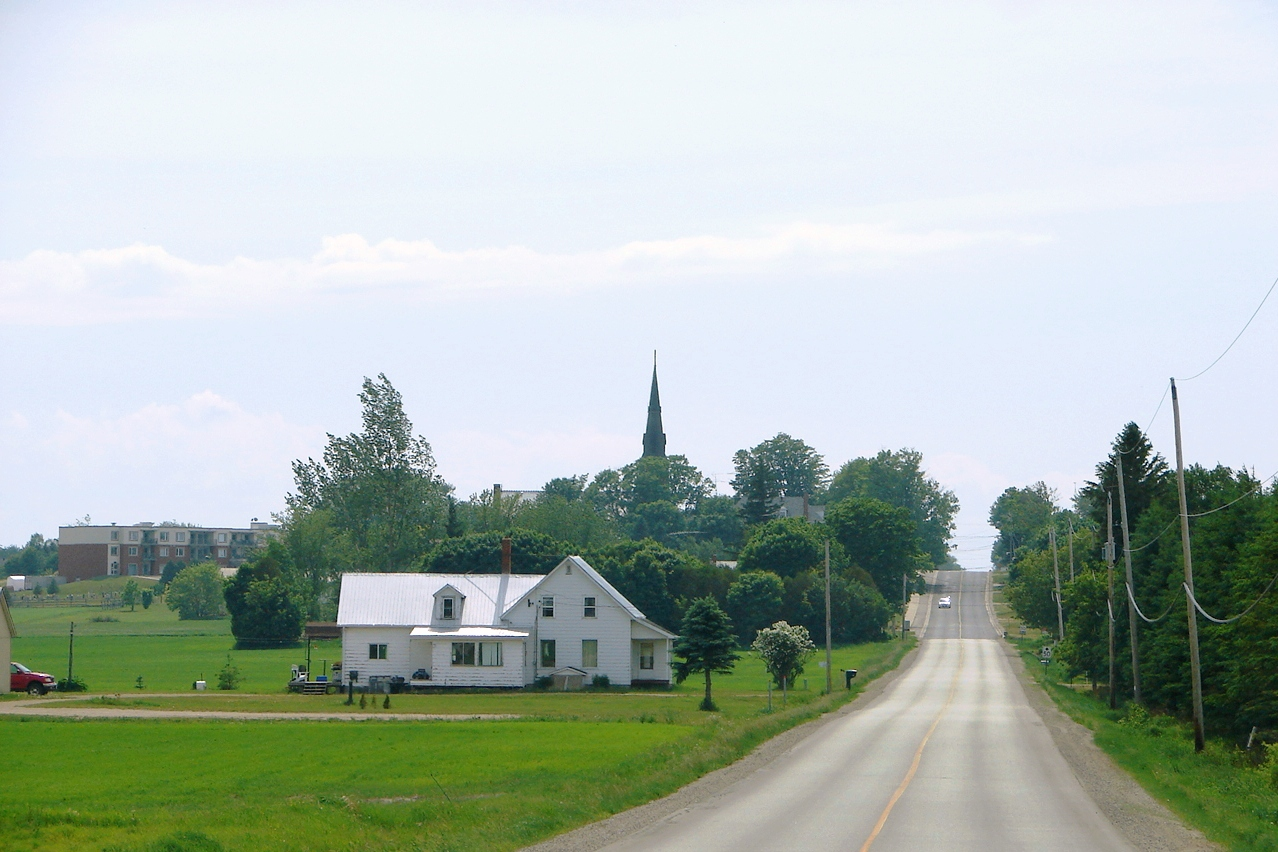
Lafontaine

Lafontaine was originally called Sainte-Croix (French for "Holy Cross"). It was renamed Lafontaine to honour the politician Louis-Hippolyte Lafontaine, one of the early Joint Premiers of the Province of Canada.

In honour of the region's French history, Lafontaine hosts the annual Le Festival du Loup in July, a festival of francophone music and culture which celebrates the death of a wolf that terrorised the village in the 19th century.

== History ==
The township was named in 1822 after a pet dog of Lady Sarah Maitland (1792–1873), wife of Sir Peregrine Maitland, Lieutenant Governor of Upper Canada. Two other adjoining townships were also named for her pet dogs, Tay and Flos (now Springwater Township).

Humans have occupied the area now known as Tiny Township for at least 11,000 years. Excavations in what is now Awenda Provincial Park in the 1970s uncovered four archaeological sites dating from the Paleo-Indian period. For much of the Pre-Contact period, the Indigenous peoples of the area would have been hunter-gathers living mostly in small family groupings which would come together in larger groupings during particular times of the year to collect resources such as fish or berries.

Around 1100 C.E., agriculture was introduced to south Central Ontario, with people growing corn, beans, squash, tobacco, and sunflowers. This led to the development of villages centred around longhouses. By 1600 C.E., the five nations of the Huron-Wendat Confederacy had established their villages in the territory they called Wendake, a part of which included what we now call Tiny Township.

Starting in 1615, French Catholic missionaries, first Récollets and then, in 1625, Jesuits, began proselytizing among the Huron-Wendat in what was then called Huronia. The Jesuits built the mission Sainte-Marie among the Hurons and wrote extensively about the Huron-Wendat culture. In 1636, Jesuit missionary Jean de Brébeuf observed and wrote about The Huron Feast of the Dead which occurred at the Huron-Wendat village of Ossossané which was located in what is now Tiny Township.

Diseases brought by the French in this period had a devastating effect on the Huron-Wendat. It is estimated that circa 1600, just prior to European contact, the total population of Wendake was between 20 000 and 25 000 people. However, a series of epidemics between 1634 and 1642 reduced the population to about 9000 people. Attacks by the Haudenosaunee in 1648 and 1649 dispersed the Wendat people, with most traditionalists joining the Haudenosaunee, while others joined with the related, neighbouring Petun people. The remaining Huron-Wendat who followed the missionaries fled to French Territory.

In the 1700s, as the threat from the Haudenosaunee waned, Ojibwe people began to move back into the area. In 1798, the Ojibwe (Chippeway) and the British signed Penetanguishene Bay Purchase turning some of the land which would become Tiny Township over to the British who soon after established a naval base at Penetanguishene. A subsequent treaty in 1815, the Lake Simcoe–Lake Huron Purchase turned over the remaining part of the land which would become Tiny Township.

By the mid-19th century, families from Quebec began moving to the Tiny Township area for the cheap and fertile land to farm. The Baldwin Act of 1850 established the Corporation of the United Townships of Tiny and Tay on January 1, 1851. On January 4, 1869, the townships were separated through a Simcoe County by-law.

The Town of Penetanguishene separated from Tiny Township on June 29, 1875, followed by the Town of Midland on October 24, 1878.

== Demographics ==
In the 2021 Census of Population conducted by Statistics Canada, Tiny had a population of 12,966 living in 5,434 of its 9,699 total private dwellings, a change of 10% from its 2016 population of 11,787. With a land area of 335.05 km^{2} (129.36 sq mi), it had a population density of 38.7/km^{2} (100.2/sq mi) in 2021.

Canada census – Tiny, Ontario community profile

	2021	2016	2011
Population	12,966 (+10.0% from 2016)	11,787 (+4.9% from 2011)	11,232 (+4.4% from 2006)
Land area	335.05 km^{2} (129.36 sq mi)	336.93 km^{2} (130.09 sq mi)	336.83 km^{2} (130.05 sq mi)
Population density	38.7/km^{2} (100/sq mi)	35.0/km^{2} (91/sq mi)	33.3/km^{2} (86/sq mi)
Median age	55.2 (M: 54.8, F: 55.2)	53.1 (M: 52.7, F: 53.7)
Private dwellings	9,699 (total) 5,434 (occupied)	9,712 (total)	9,564 (total)
Median household income	$88,000	$69,915

References: 2021 2016 2011

Historical census populations – Tiny, Ontario

Year	Pop.	±%
1871	3,214	—
1881	3,736	+16.2%
1891	4,784	+28.1%
1901	4,386	−8.3%
1911	4,121	−6.0%
1921	4,026	−2.3%
1931	3,693	−8.3%
1941	3,554	−3.8%

Year	Pop.	±%
1951	3,970	+11.7%
1956	4,071	+2.5%
1961	4,430	+8.8%
1966	4,621	+4.3%
1971	5,519	+19.4%
1976	6,682	+21.1%
1981	7,171	+7.3%
1986	7,801	+8.8%

Year	Pop.	±%
1991	9,035	+15.8%
1996	8,644	−4.3%
2001	9,035	+4.5%
2006	10,754	+19.0%
2011	11,232	+4.4%
2016	11,787	+4.9%
2021	12,966	+10.0%

2006 Population figure based on revised count. Population counts are not adjusted for boundary changes.
Source: Statistics Canada

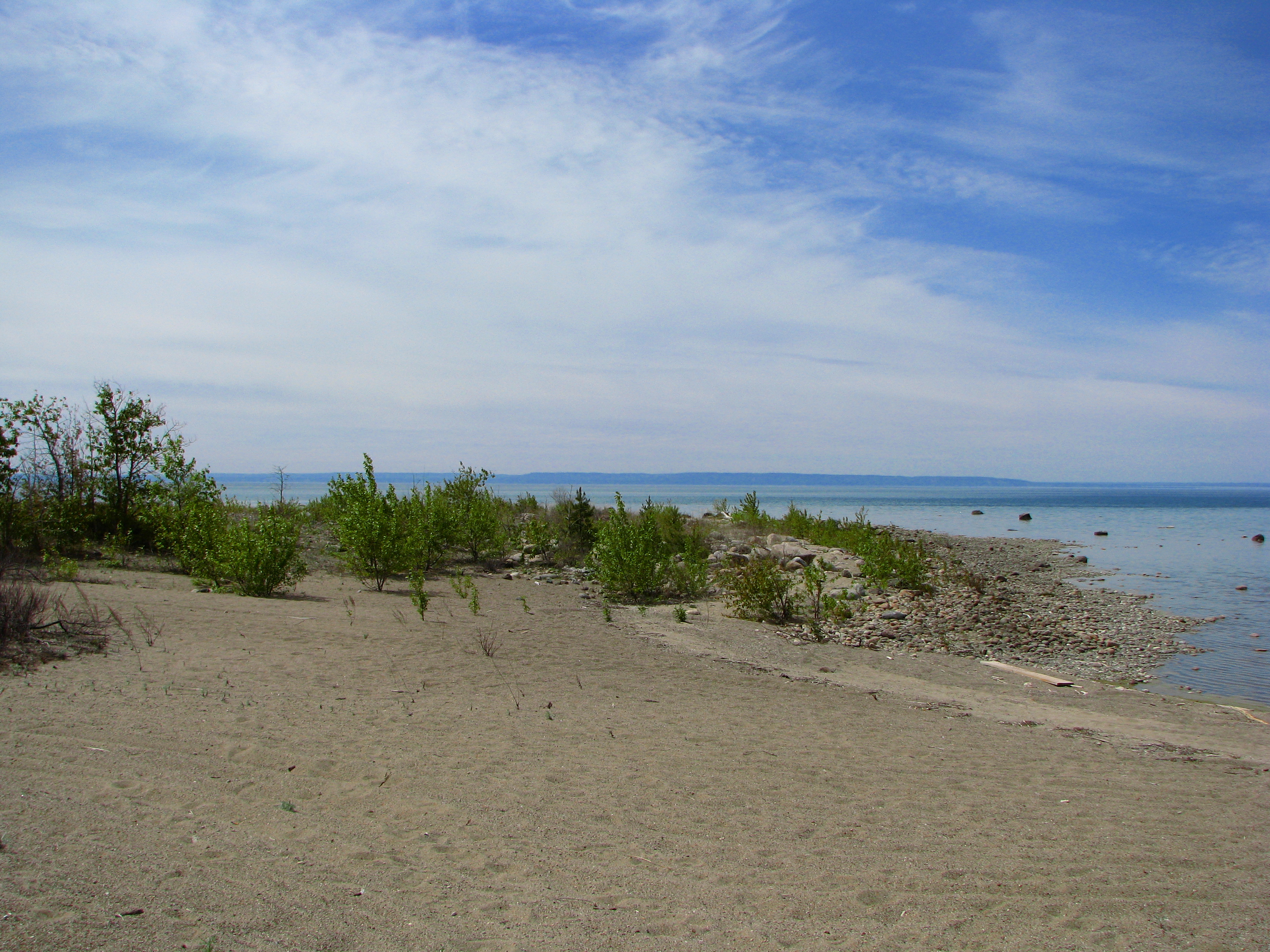
Sandy beach on Nottawasaga Bay near Lafontaine

== Services ==
The township's fire protection services are provided by the Township of Tiny Fire and Emergency Services. The service has a complement of 95 firefighters operating 15 pieces of fire apparatus from five stations located in Lafontaine, Wyevale, North West Basin, Wyebridge and Woodland Beach. The township falls within the jurisdiction of the Ontario Provincial Police and is policed by members of the Southern Georgian Bay and Huronia West detachments.

== Notable people ==
- Damien Robitaille, Musician
- Glenn Howard, Curler

== See also ==
- List of townships in Ontario
- List of francophone communities in Ontario
