= Simcoe County =

- County (upper-tier)
- County of Simcoe
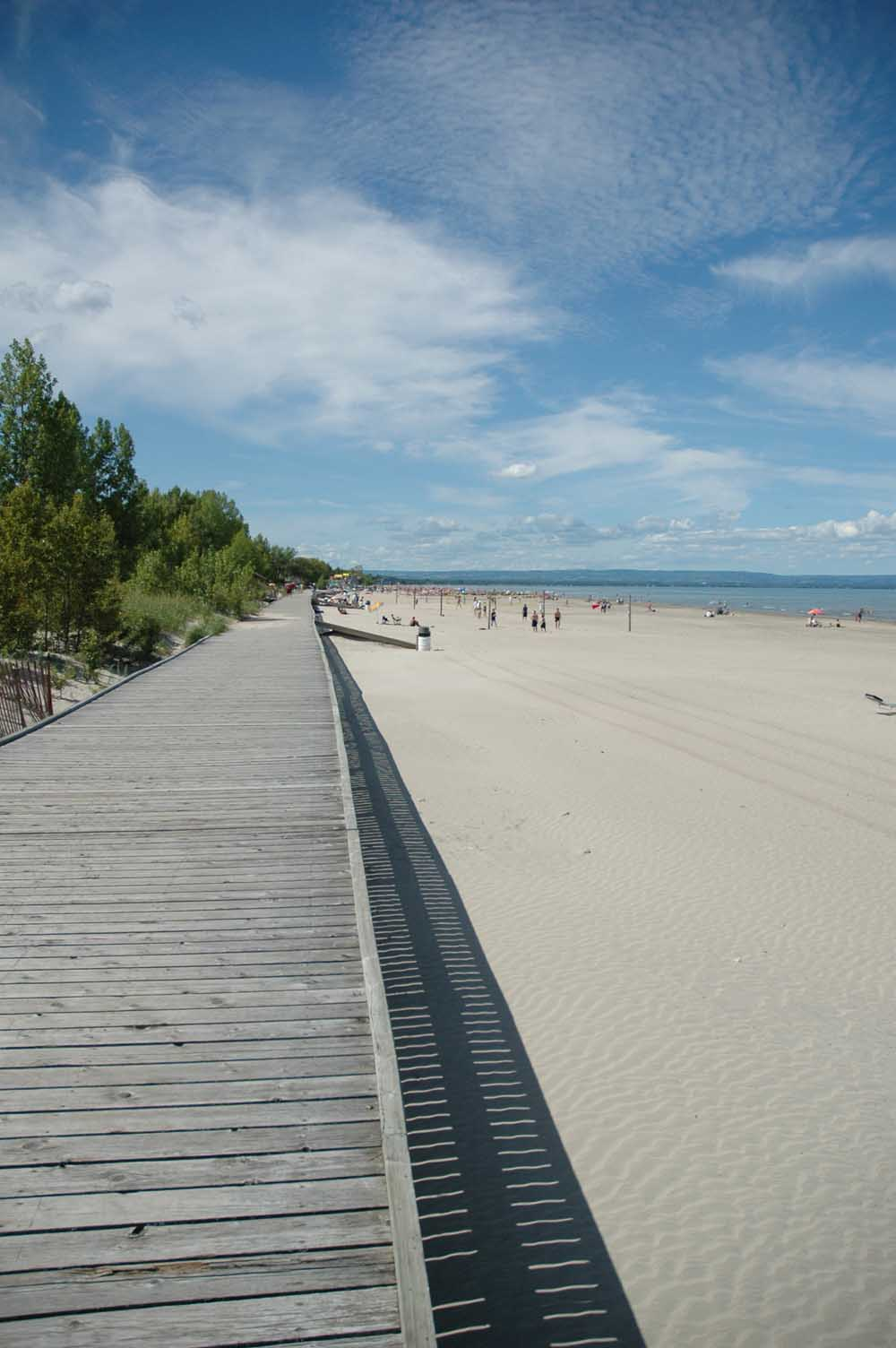
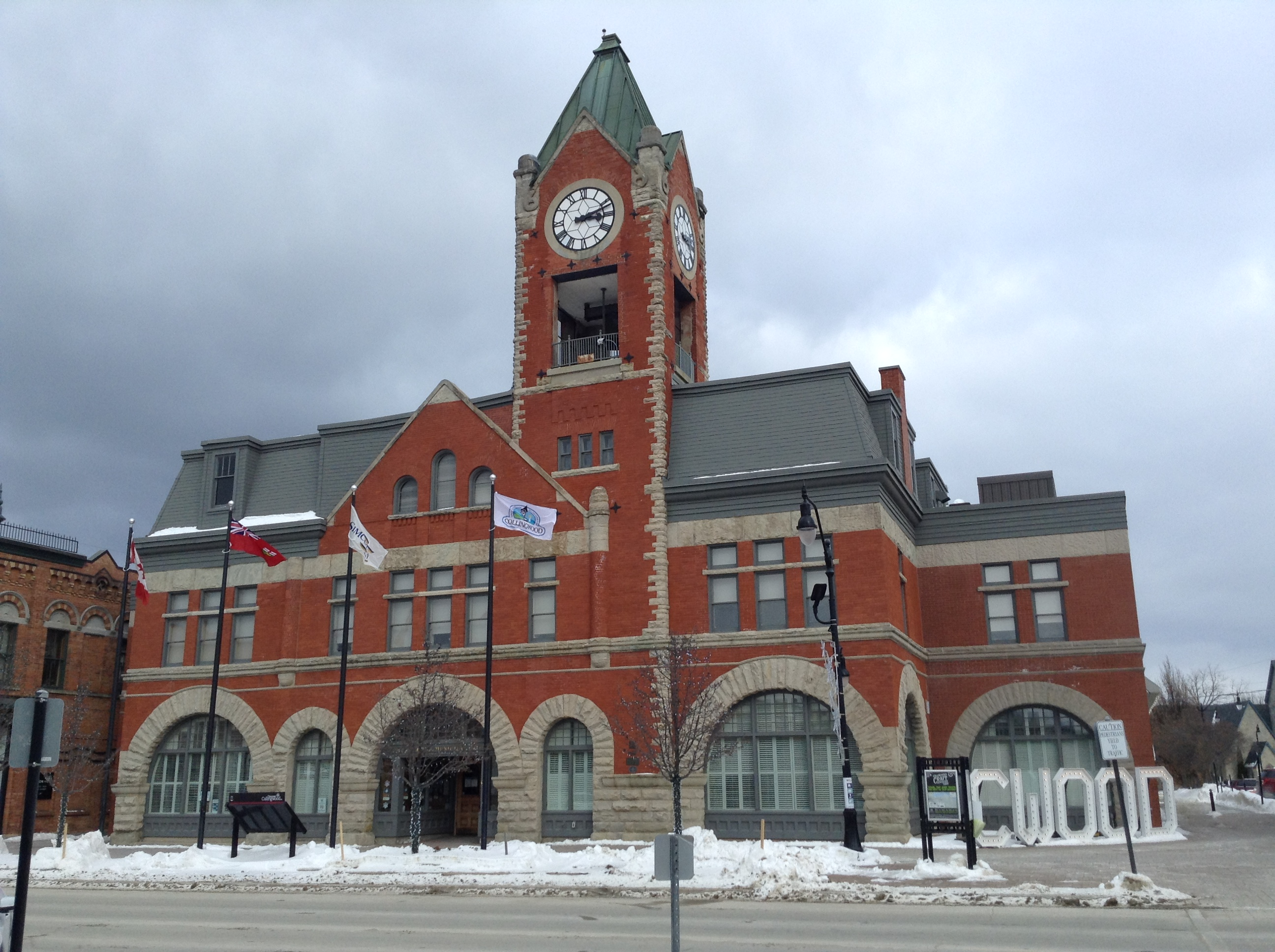
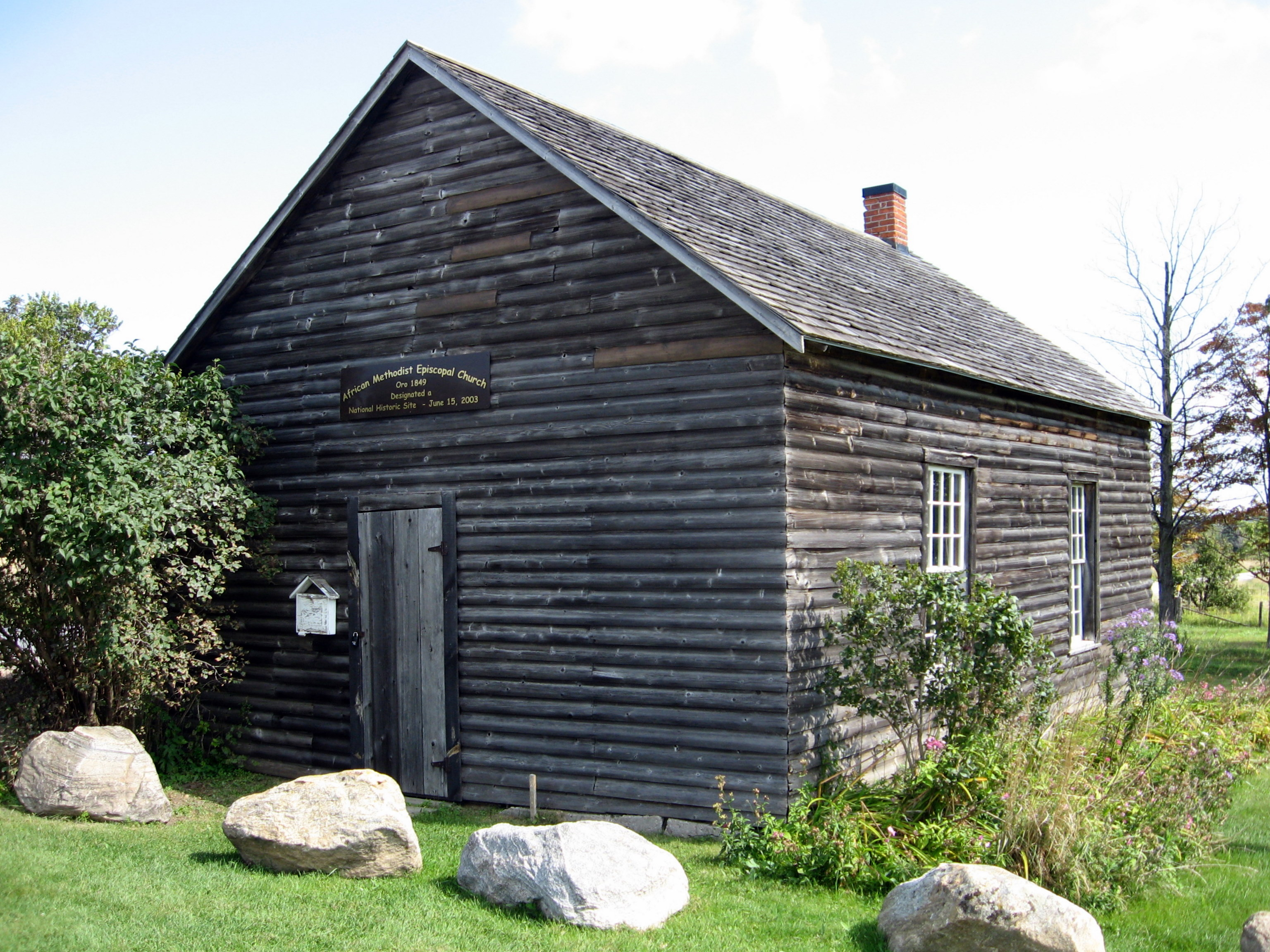
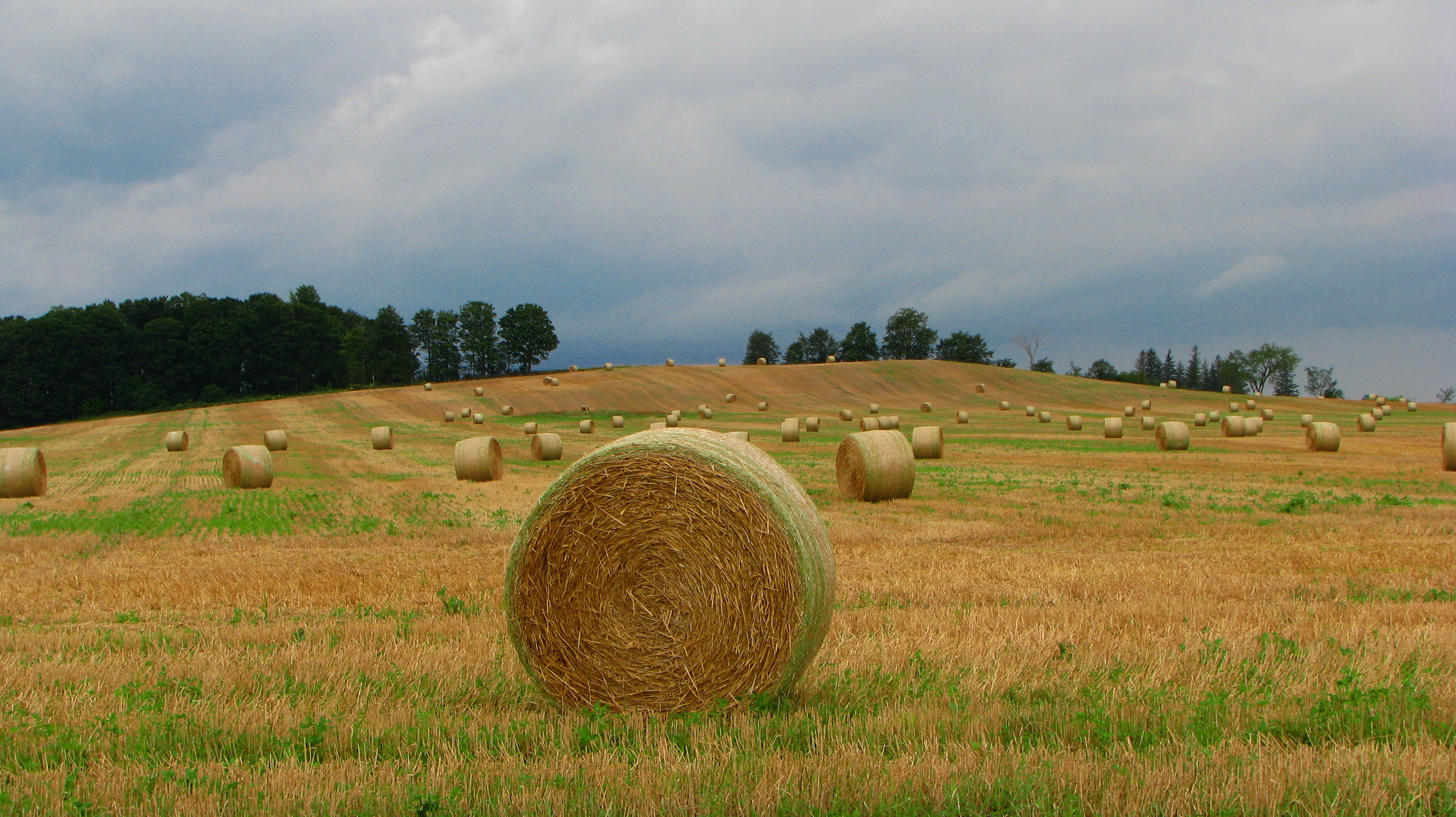
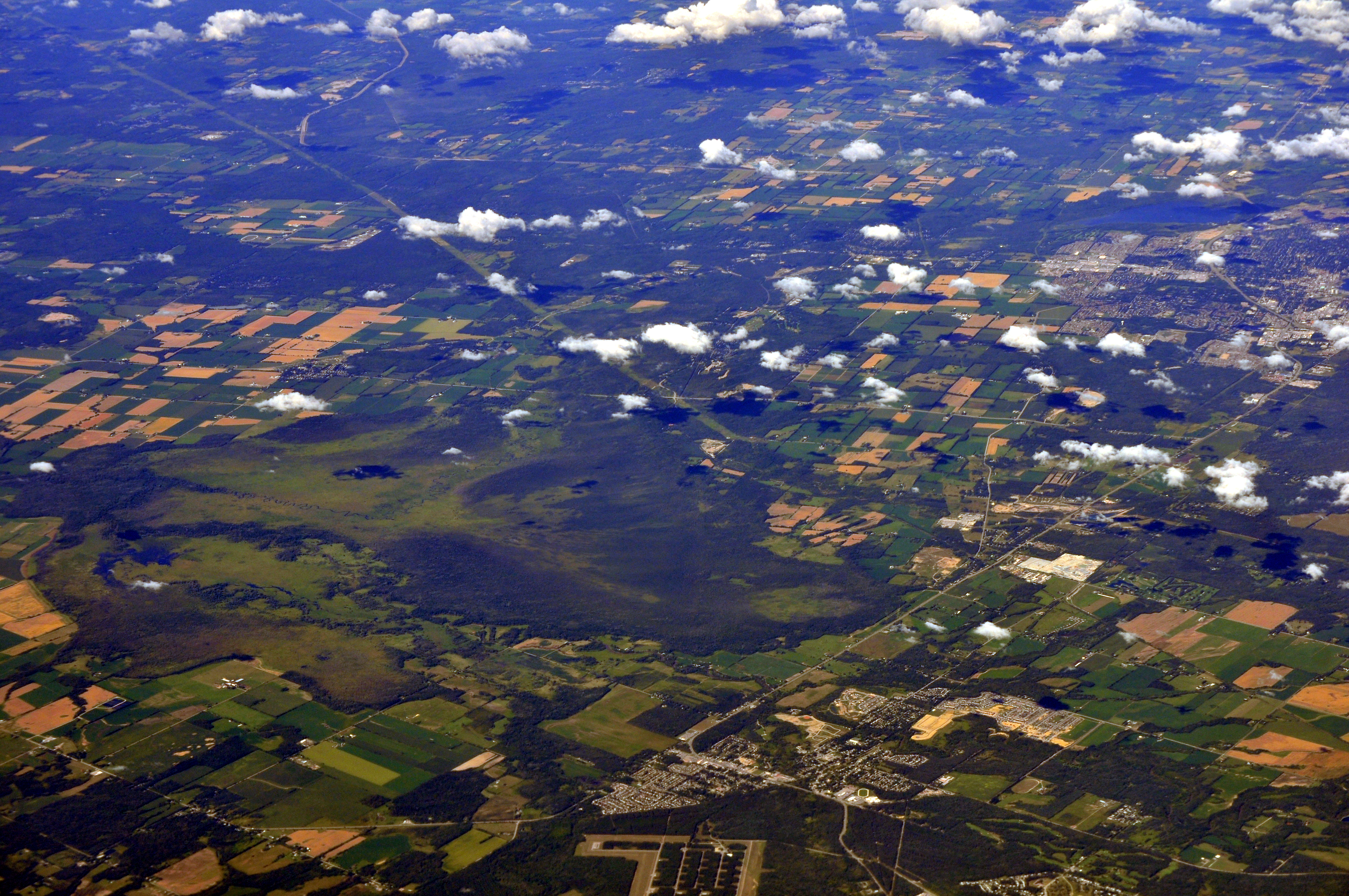
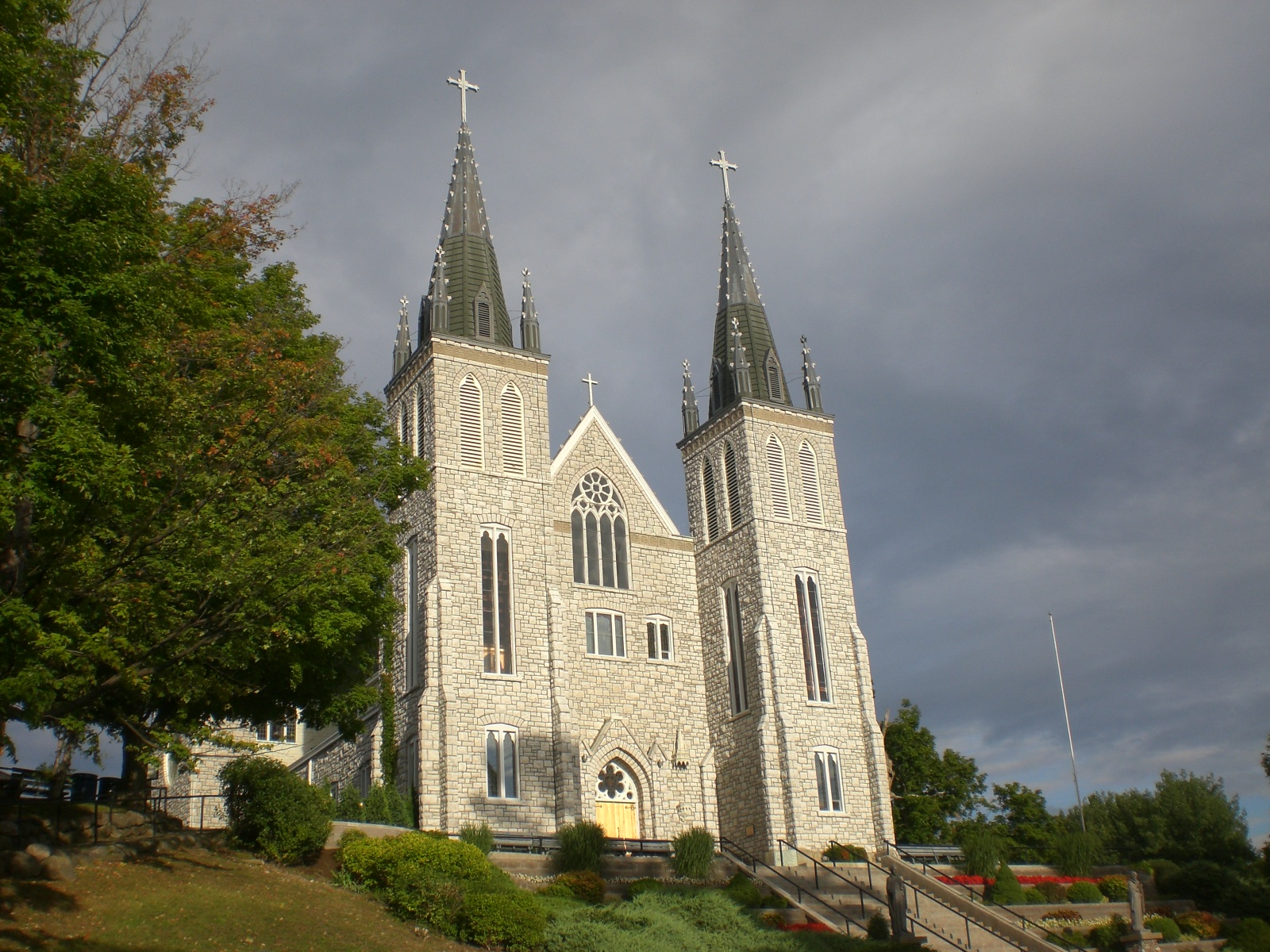
- Clockwise from top left: Wasaga Beach, Collingwood Town Hall, straw bales near Alliston, The Martyrs' Shrine, Minesing Wetlands, Oro African Church

- Emblem

- Map showing Simcoe County's location in Ontario
- Coordinates: 44°35′N 79°44′W
- Country: Canada
- Province: Ontario
- Established: 1843 (as Simcoe District)
- County seat: Midhurst
- Subdivisions: List: Municipalities; Town of Bradford West Gwillimbury; Town of Collingwood; Town of Innisfil; Town of Midland; Town of New Tecumseth; Town of Penetanguishene; Town of Wasaga Beach; Township of Adjala–Tosorontio; Township of Clearview; Township of Essa; Township of Oro-Medonte; Township of Ramara; Township of Severn; Township of Springwater; Township of Tay; Township of Tiny

Government
  - Type: Upper Tier municipality
  - Council: Simcoe County Council

Area
  - Land: 4,691.39 km^{2} (1,811.36 sq mi)
  - Census div.: 4,818.93 km^{2} (1,860.60 sq mi)
- Land area excludes Barrie and Orillia

Population (2021)
  - Total: 351,929
  - Density: 75/km^{2} (190/sq mi)
  - Census div.: 533,169
  - Census div. density: 110.6/km^{2} (286/sq mi)
- Total excludes Barrie and Orillia
- Demonym: Simcoe Countian
- Time zone: UTC-5 (EST)
  - Summer (DST): UTC-4 (EDT)
- Area codes: 705, 249, and 683
- Website: www.simcoe.ca

Simcoe County is a county and census division located in the central region of Ontario, Canada. The county is located north of the Greater Toronto Area, and forms the northwestern edge of the Golden Horseshoe. The county seat is located in Midhurst. The cities of Barrie and Orillia are geographically within Simcoe County, but are both politically independent single-tier municipalities.

== Geography ==
Simcoe County stretches from the shores of Lake Simcoe in the east to Georgian Bay in the west. The land area of the county is 4,818.93 square kilometres (1,860.60 sq mi). The Niagara Escarpment runs through sections of the western part of the county, and the Minesing Wetlands, a Ramsar Convention "Wetland of International Importance", is located in the centre of the county.

Simcoe County is informally split into two subregions, "South Simcoe" and "North Simcoe". The dividing line between these two areas is Simcoe County Road 90 (Mill St.).

South Simcoe municipalities are situated at the northern boundary of the Greater Toronto Area (GTA) and therefore generally have a closer socio-economic association with the GTA. South Simcoe is also within the Toronto commuter belt, as it is home to a relatively high proportion of people commuting to the GTA. South Simcoe is home to five municipalities, including: the Town of Innisfil, the Township of Adjala-Tosorontio, the Town of Bradford West Gwillimbury, the Township of Essa and the Town of New Tecumseth (which includes: Alliston, Beeton and Tottenham).

North Simcoe is less connected to the GTA due to its more remote geographic location, is generally less industrial than South Simcoe, and generally has a closer socio-economic association with the Muskoka area, located immediately north. However, North Simcoe hosts two GO Transit train stations that provide daily commuter rail service to Toronto. North Simcoe includes the Township of Clearview, the Township of Oro-Medonte, the Township of Ramara, the Township of Severn, the Township of Springwater, the Township of Tay and the Township of Tiny, the Town of Collingwood, the Town of Midland, the Town of Penetanguishene and the Town of Wasaga Beach. The cities of Barrie and Orillia are geographically within North Simcoe, but both are politically independent single-tier municipalities.

== History ==
Simcoe County, in particular the former Wendake area near Nottawasaga Bay, was the site of the earliest French exploration and settlement of Ontario; they were the first Europeans in the area. Several historic sites, including Carhagouha and Sainte-Marie among the Hurons, mark the earliest known contacts between the area's traditional Huron population and French missionaries. The Huron capital, Ossossané, was at one time the largest aboriginal settlement in all of North America outside Mexico.

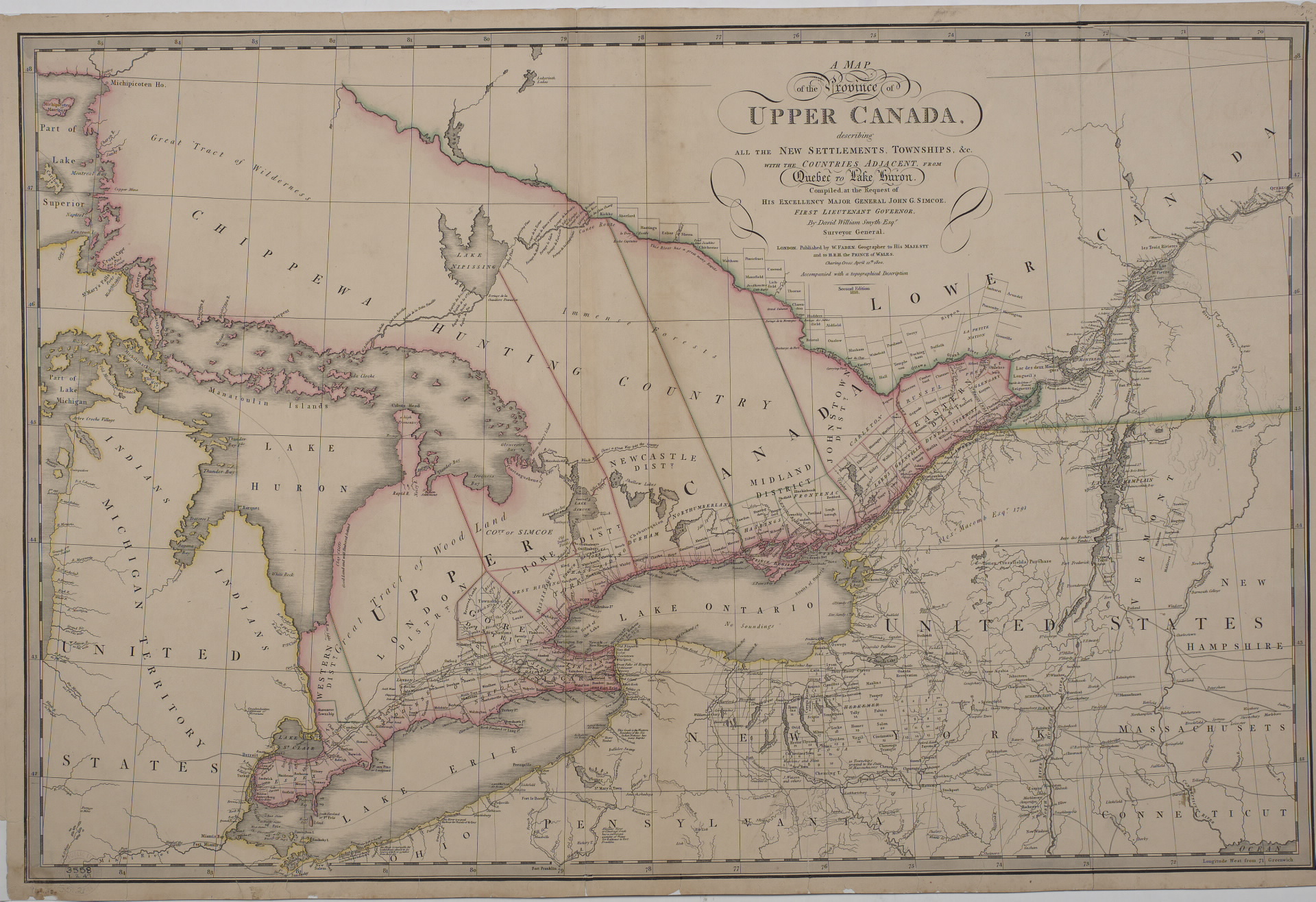
The province of Upper Canada, 1818

The County, named by Lieutenant Governor of Upper Canada John Graves Simcoe in honour of his father Captain John Simcoe, was established as part of the Home District in 1798 by the Legislative Assembly of Upper Canada. Its initial territory was described as follows:

...Matchedash, Gloucester, or Penetanguishene, together with Prince William Henry's Island, and all the land lying between the Midland District and a line produced due north from a certain fixed boundary (at the distance of about fifty miles north-west from the outlet of Burlington Bay) till it intersects the northern limits of the Province...

At its beginning, the County existed only for military enlistment. In 1823, it became a separate constituency for elections to the Legislative Assembly of Upper Canada, but, as eligibility to vote was dependent upon having title to property, and Simcoe's first registrar of deeds was not appointed until 1826, it did not send a separate member to the Assembly until the election of John Cawthra in 1828. It was withdrawn from the Home District in 1837, with its territory divided as follows:

Townships of Simcoe County in 1837 (before reorganization)
District	County	Townships
Simcoe	Simcoe	Adjala; Essa; Flos; West Gwillimbury; Innisfil; Matchedash; Medonte; Nottawasaga; Orillia (North Division); Orillia (South Division); Oro; Sunnidale; Tay; Tecumseth; Tiny; Tosorontio; Vespra
Wellington	Waterloo	Amaranth; Luther; Melancthon; Proton
Home	Fourth Riding of York	Thorah; Mara; Rama

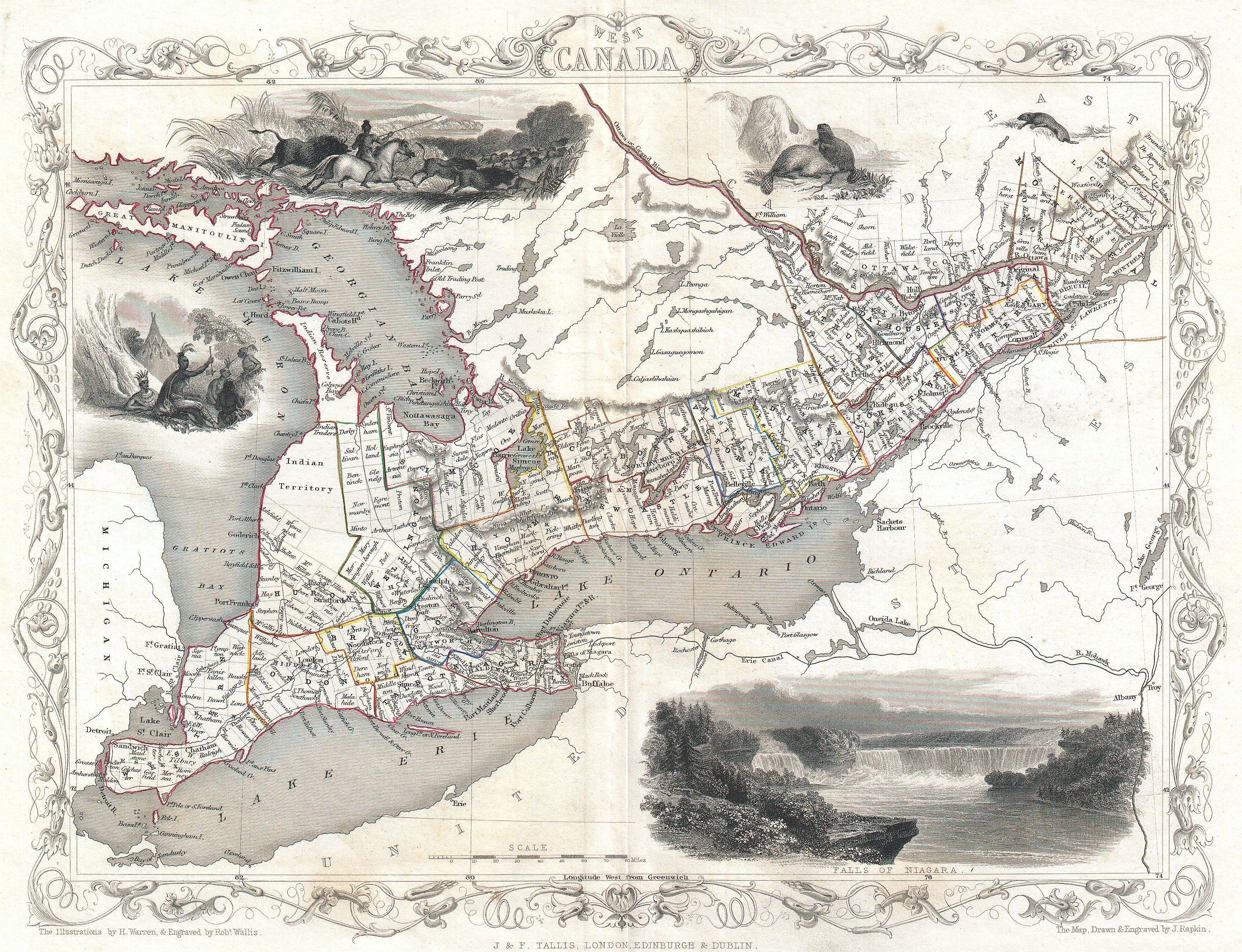
1850 Tallis Map of West Canada - Simcoe County highlighted in red

Between 1837 and 1841, several acts were passed by the Legislature of Upper Canada that set apart the Simcoe District. These acts named the townships that the County would encompass and authorized the levying of taxes for the purpose of constructing a jail and courthouse. On January 11, 1843, the jail and courthouse having been duly erected, the Governor General proclaimed the County of Simcoe to be a separate and distinct District. The province of Canada also appointed James R. Gowan as the first judge of the District of Simcoe.

The District was restructured in 1845, changing its composition to the following 24 townships:

- Adjala
- Artemesia
- Collingwood
- Essa
- Flos
- West Gwillimbury
- Innisfil
- Medonte
- Matchedash
- Mulmur
- Mono
- Nottawasaga
- Osprey
- Oro
- North Orillia
- South Orillia
- Saint Vincent
- Sunnidale
- Tay
- Tecumseth
- Tosorontio
- Tiny
- Uphrasia (sic)
- Vespra

Effective January 1, 1850, the Simcoe District was abolished, and Simcoe County was organized for municipal purposes.

Between 1845 and 1851, there had been a campaign to have the part of West Gwillimbury south of the Holland River annexed to York County. The County Council finally agreed to this action in 1851, subject to arbitration as to the division of liabilities. It was implemented by an Act of the Parliament of the Province of Canada later that year.

On January 1, 1852, after transferring its five western townships to Grey County, the County was defined as including the following townships:

- Adjala
- Essa
- Flos
- Gwillimbury West
- Innisfil
- Matchedash
- Medonte
- Mono
- Mulmur
- Nottawasaga
- Orillia
- Oro
- Sunnidale
- Tay
- Tecumseth
- Tiny
- Tossorontio (sic)
- Vespra

Together with the unorganized territory bounded to the north by the French River, to the south by the Severn River and Rama Township, to the west by Lake Huron and to the east by the former boundary between the Home District and the Newcastle District as extended to the French River.

The unorganized territory, some of which had been surveyed into townships, together with parts of Victoria County and Nipissing District, was withdrawn in 1868–1869 to form the new District of Muskoka and District of Parry Sound. However, any municipalities established in them still formed part of the original counties for municipal purposes, and they were still responsible for the administration of justice, which proved to be problematic. The portions of the districts that were not part of Simcoe County were transferred to it in 1877. This lasted until 1888, when the territory contained within the districts was separated from Simcoe County.

Mono and Mulmur Townships were withdrawn from Simcoe County in 1881 and transferred to the newly formed Dufferin County.

Mara and Rama Townships were transferred to Simcoe County following the dissolution of Ontario County in 1974.

=== Restructuring (1994) ===
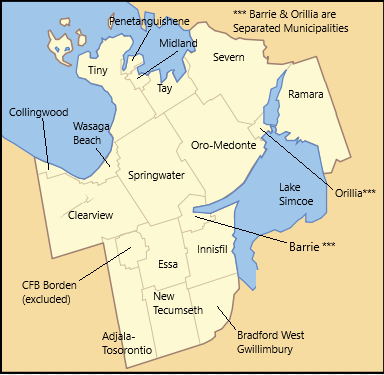
Map of Simcoe County, its component municipalities, Separated municipalities and CFB Borden.

In 1994, the County was restructured into 16 local municipalities:

- Town of Bradford West Gwillimbury
- Town of Collingwood
- Town of Innisfil
- Town of Midland
- Town of New Tecumseth
- Town of Penetanguishene
- Town of Wasaga Beach
- Township of Adjala–Tosorontio
- Township of Clearview
- Township of Essa
- Township of Oro-Medonte
- Township of Ramara
- Township of Severn
- Township of Springwater
- Township of Tay
- Township of Tiny

The cities of Barrie and Orillia are separated from the County, as are three Indian reserves:

- Christian Island 30
- Christian Island 30A
- Mnjikaning First Nation 32

== Demographics ==
As a census division in the 2021 Census of Population conducted by Statistics Canada, Simcoe County had a population of 533,169 living in 202,824 of its 225,087 total private dwellings, a change of 11.2% from its 2016 population of 479,635. With a land area of 4,818.93 km^{2} (1,860.60 sq mi), it had a population density of 110.6/km^{2} (286.6/sq mi) in 2021.

Canada census – Simcoe County (census division) community profile

	2021	2016	2011
Population	533,169 (+11.2% from 2016)	479,650 (+7.5% from 2011)	446,063 (+5.7% from 2006)
Land area	4,818.93 km^{2} (1,860.60 sq mi)	4,859.64 km^{2} (1,876.32 sq mi)	4,859.16 km^{2} (1,876.13 sq mi)
Population density	110.6/km^{2} (286/sq mi)	98.7/km^{2} (256/sq mi)	91.8/km^{2} (238/sq mi)
Median age	43.2 (M: 41.6, F: 44.4)	43.1 (M: 41.9, F: 44.3)
Private dwellings	225,087 (total) 202,824 (occupied)	206,549 (total) 183,536 (occupied)	195,388 (total)
Median household income	$93,000	$76,489

Notes: Includes separated municipalities of Barrie and Orillia.
References: 2021 2016 2011

Historical census populations – Simcoe County

Year	Pop.	±%
1921	84,032	—
1931	83,667	−0.4%
1941	87,057	+4.1%
1951	106,482	+22.3%
1956	127,016	+19.3%
1961	141,271	+11.2%

Year	Pop.	±%
1966	149,132	+5.6%
1971	171,433	+15.0%
1976	210,691	+22.9%
1981	225,071	+6.8%
1986	238,408	+5.9%
1991	288,684	+21.1%

Year	Pop.	±%
1996	329,865	+14.3%
2001	377,050	+14.3%
2006	422,204	+12.0%
2011	446,063	+5.7%
2016	479,650	+7.5%
2021	533,169	+11.2%

Population counts are not adjusted for boundary changes.
Source: Statistics Canada

Panethnic groups in Simcoe County (2001−2021)
Panethnic group	2021		2016		2011		2006		2001	
Panethnic group	Pop.	%	Pop.	%	Pop.	%	Pop.	%	Pop.	%
European (Note: Statistic includes all persons that did not make up part of a visible minority or an indigenous identity.)	435,295	82.9%	415,205	88.13%	400,355	91.35%	387,295	92.88%	351,440	94.39%
Indigenous	24,545	4.67%	21,960	4.66%	17,540	4%	13,035	3.13%	9,520	2.56%
South Asian	16,270	3.1%	7,245	1.54%	3,625	0.83%	3,290	0.79%	1,835	0.49%
African	12,725	2.42%	7,150	1.52%	4,465	1.02%	3,660	0.88%	2,850	0.77%
Southeast Asian (Note: Statistic includes total responses of "Filipino" and "Southeast Asian" under visible minority section on census.)	8,895	1.69%	5,375	1.14%	3,270	0.75%	2,615	0.63%	1,800	0.48%
East Asian (Note: Statistic includes total responses of "Chinese", "Korean", and "Japanese" under visible minority section on census.)	7,930	1.51%	5,635	1.2%	4,070	0.93%	3,190	0.76%	2,710	0.73%
Latin American	7,820	1.49%	3,990	0.85%	2,135	0.49%	1,755	0.42%	915	0.25%
Middle Eastern (Note: Statistic includes total responses of "West Asian" and "Arab" under visible minority section on census.)	6,485	1.24%	2,035	0.43%	780	0.18%	915	0.22%	470	0.13%
Other (Note: Statistic includes total responses of "Visible minority, n.i.e." and "Multiple visible minorities" under visible minority section on census.)	5,110	0.97%	2,540	0.54%	2,050	0.47%	1,235	0.3%	790	0.21%
Total responses	525,080	98.48%	471,130	98.22%	438,285	98.26%	417,000	98.77%	372,330	98.75%
Total population	533,169	100%	479,650	100%	446,063	100%	422,204	100%	377,050	100%
Note: Totals greater than 100% due to multiple origin responses

== Government ==
The Corporation of the County of Simcoe comprises 16 local municipalities. As an "upper tier" municipality, the County of Simcoe is responsible for municipal services which include social housing, land ambulance and emergency planning, environmental services (solid waste management), a County road system, Ontario Works, children's services, homes for the aged, a library co-operative, museum, archives, County forest management, tourism, a Geographic Information System (computer mapping) and land use policy planning.

The local, or "lower tier" municipalities are responsible for water and sewer services, local roads, public libraries, recreation services, fire and police services, land use development control, and licensing and permitting services.

The cities of Barrie and Orillia, although separate politically and administratively from the County, are geographically and economically part of the County and send elected representatives to serve on County committees which provide services to the residents of the cities, including paramedic services, long term care facilities, social services, social housing, archives and Museum. They are counted within the census division.

The County Council is composed of the mayors and deputy mayors of each of the sixteen towns and townships that comprise the County of Simcoe. The head of the County Council is called the Warden and is elected for a one-year term by the council members at the Inaugural Meeting, held each December.

Though once a consideration according to the Wasaga Sun, Simcoe County has elected not to restructure itself as a regional municipality.

=== Federal and provincial representation ===
Simcoe County encompasses all or part of the federal electoral districts of Barrie—Springwater—Oro-Medonte, Barrie—Innisfil, York—Simcoe, Simcoe—Grey and Simcoe North.

The current Members of Parliament representing Simcoe County are:

- Bruce Stanton (Conservative), Simcoe North
- Terry Dowdall (Conservative), Simcoe—Grey
- Doug Shipley (Conservative), Barrie—Springwater—Oro-Medonte
- John Brassard (Conservative), Barrie—Innisfil
- Scot Davidson (Conservative), York—Simcoe

Simcoe County encompasses all or part of the provincial electoral districts of Barrie—Springwater—Oro-Medonte, Barrie—Innisfil, York—Simcoe, Simcoe—Grey and Simcoe North.

The current Members of Provincial Parliament representing Simcoe County are:

- Jill Dunlop (Progressive Conservative), Simcoe North
- Brian Saunderson (Progressive Conservative), Simcoe—Grey
- Doug Downey (Progressive Conservative), Barrie—Springwater—Oro-Medonte
- Andrea Khanjin (Progressive Conservative), Barrie—Innisfil
- Caroline Mulroney (Progressive Conservative), York—Simcoe

=== Local services ===
==== Law enforcement and policing ====
Five police services provide law enforcement and local policing in Simcoe County:

- Barrie Police Service in Barrie
- South Simcoe Police Service in Innisfil and Bradford West Gwillimbury
- Rama Police Service in Rama, Ontario and for the Chippewas of Rama First Nation
- Anishinabek Police Service on Christian Island and for the Beausoleil First Nation
- Ontario Provincial Police (OPP) for the rest of the county, including Orillia, and enforcement on provincial highways, especially Ontario Highway 400 and Ontario Highway 11.

The Midland Police Service, which served the Town of Midland, was disbanded in February 2018. The OPP assumed policing responsibilities in Midland afterwards.

Canadian Forces Military Police provides policing and security for CFB Borden (25 km southwest of Barrie).

==== Public health ====
The local public agency for the county, the cities of Barrie and Orillia, and the neighbouring District Municipality of Muskoka is the Simcoe Muskoka District Health Unit. It is responsible for delivering public health programs and services, enforcing public health regulations, and advising local officials and local governments on health issues.

Simcoe County has five hospitals:

- Royal Victoria Regional Health Centre in Barrie
- Orillia Soldiers’ Memorial Hospital
- Stevenson Memorial Hospital in Alliston, Ontario (New Tecumseth)
- Collingwood General And Marine Hospital
- Georgian Bay General Hospital in Midland and Penetanguishene

Southern parts of the County are also served by the Southlake Regional Health Centre in Newmarket, Ontario (York Region).

The County operates ambulance and paramedic services (EMS) for the county and the independent cities of Barrie and Orillia. The Beausoleil First Nation (Christian Island) and the Chippewas of Rama First Nation (Rama) operate their own EMS services for their territories.

== Economy ==
The economy of Simcoe County is diverse and includes a full range of businesses from agricultural, industrial, and high-tech sectors.

Honda of Canada Manufacturing has been established in Simcoe County since 1986 and is one of the county's largest single employers. In addition to the automotive industry, other industries include plastics, glass manufacturing, pharmaceuticals, and aggregate resources. The county is also home to other institutions, including Casino Rama, Georgian College, Canadian Forces Base Borden, a campus of Lakehead University, and the Ontario Provincial Police Headquarters.

Agri-business is a diverse industry within the region, which contains highly productive farmland, including a portion of the Holland Marsh in Bradford.

Tourism is a vital industry in Simcoe County, providing a diversity of jobs and economic impact in a variety of sectors, including accommodation, restaurants, destinations, events, and retail. Simcoe County plays host to over eight million visitors annually, which contributes more than 570 million dollars in spending to its economy.

== Transportation ==
=== Road ===
The road network in Simcoe County is based on a grid pattern, with most roads running north–south or east–west. The topography of the land has permitted roads to be set in predominantly straight lines.

Simcoe County is traversed by many Provincial Highways; Ontario Highway 400 being the most significant. Other provincial highways in Simcoe County include: Highway 11, Highway 12, Highway 26, Highway 89 and Highway 93.

Simcoe County also maintains an extensive series of County Roads, see List of numbered roads in Simcoe County.

=== Rail ===
GO Transit operates daily commuter rail services to and from downtown Toronto along its Barrie line with three stops in Simcoe County: one stop in Bradford West Gwillimbury (Bradford) and two stops in Barrie (Barrie South and Allandale Waterfront).

Via Rail's Canadian Toronto-Vancouver transcontinental passenger train makes request stops at the Washago railway station in Severn.

There are three main rail freight operators in Simcoe County: Canadian National Railway (CN), Canadian Pacific Railway (CPR), and Barrie Collingwood Railway.

=== Air ===
Lake Simcoe Regional Airport is a registered airport located almost midway between Barrie and Orillia, in the township of Oro-Medonte. The airport is owned jointly by the City of Barrie (10%), and the County (90%). The airport is equipped to accommodate propeller and jet aircraft, and is classified as an airport of entry by Nav Canada and is staffed by the Canada Border Services Agency. The County is also served by the Orillia Ramara Regional Airport in Ramara, 12 km northeast of Orillia. The closest major airport, however, is Toronto Pearson International Airport.

=== Public transit ===
==== LINX ====
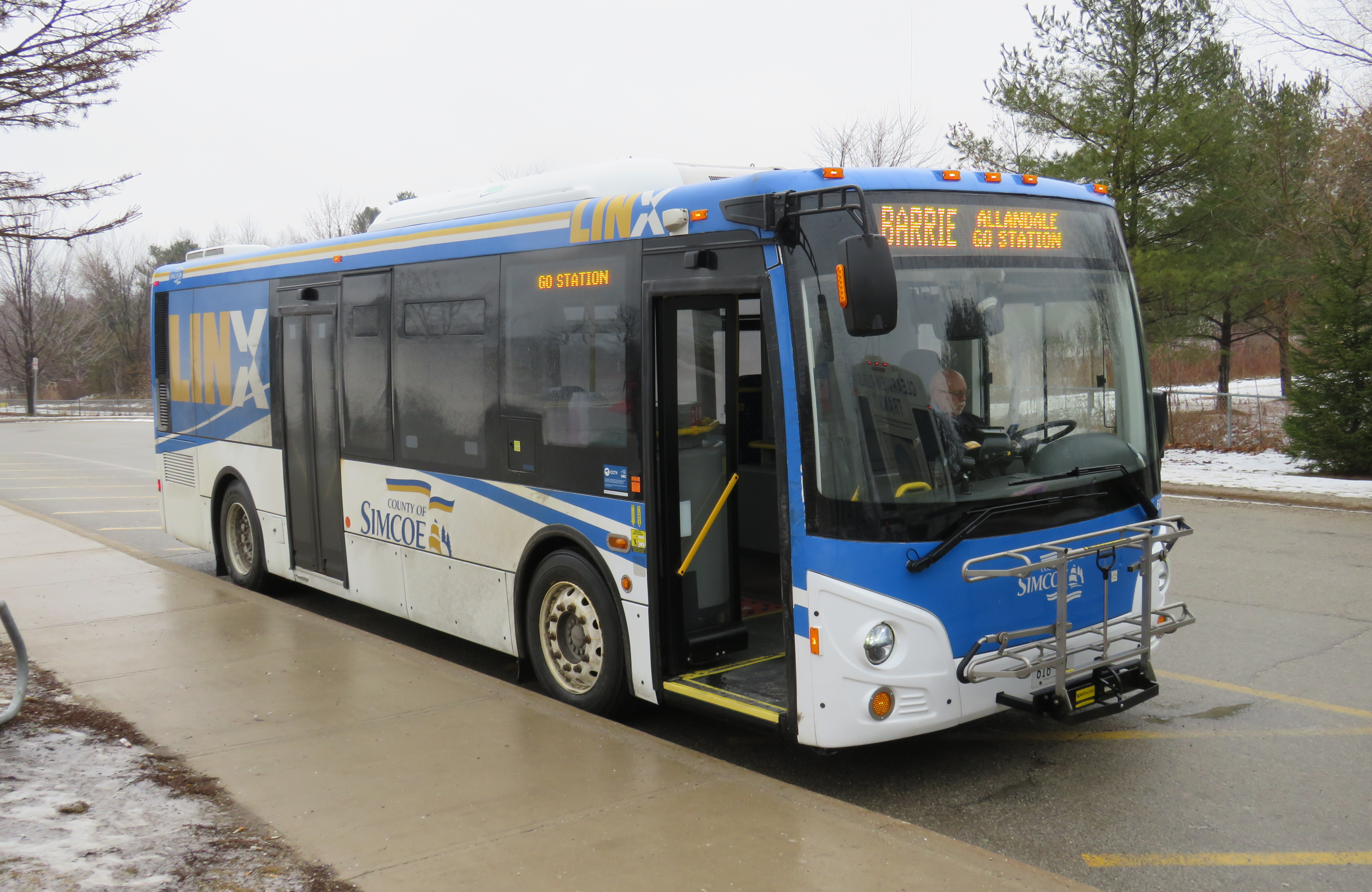
LINX bus in Wasaga Beach

The County has operated an intercommunity regional bus service, LINX, since 2018. It also operates a subsidiary paratransit service called LINX+. The LINX system connects population centres in the area, such as Barrie, Orillia, Midland, Penetanguishene, Wasaga Beach, and Collingwood, and acts as an intermediate transit layer between local community bus services and higher-order regional transit, such as GO Transit and Ontario Northland. Planned future routes would connect Alliston with Bradford West Gwillimbury, and Midland with Orillia.

==== Local transit ====
Some of the County's larger urban centres have local public transit operations, which consist of bus services. These include Barrie Transit, BWG Transit (Bradford West Gwillimbury), Colltrans (Collingwood), Orillia Transit, Midland Penetanguishene Transit, and Wasaga Beach Transit.

==== Intercity bus ====
Intercity bus services serving Simcoe County include GO Transit (Route 68), and Ontario Northland.

== Education ==
Four public school boards operate in Simcoe County:

- The Simcoe County District School Board operates all English-language secular public schools within Simcoe County.
- The Simcoe Muskoka Catholic District School Board operates the English-language separate Catholic school system within Simcoe County.
- The Conseil scolaire Viamonde operates all French-language secular public schools within Simcoe County.
- The Conseil scolaire catholique MonAvenir operates all French-language Catholic schools within Simcoe County.

Undergraduate and graduate university programs are offered at Lakehead University in Orillia. Post-secondary education is also offered by Georgian College in Barrie, Midland, Orillia and Collingwood. Several additional universities offer programs through the University Partnership Centre (UPC) in Georgian College.

== See also ==
- List of municipalities in Ontario
- List of townships in Ontario
