= LINX Transit =

Regional public transit in Simcoe County, Ontario

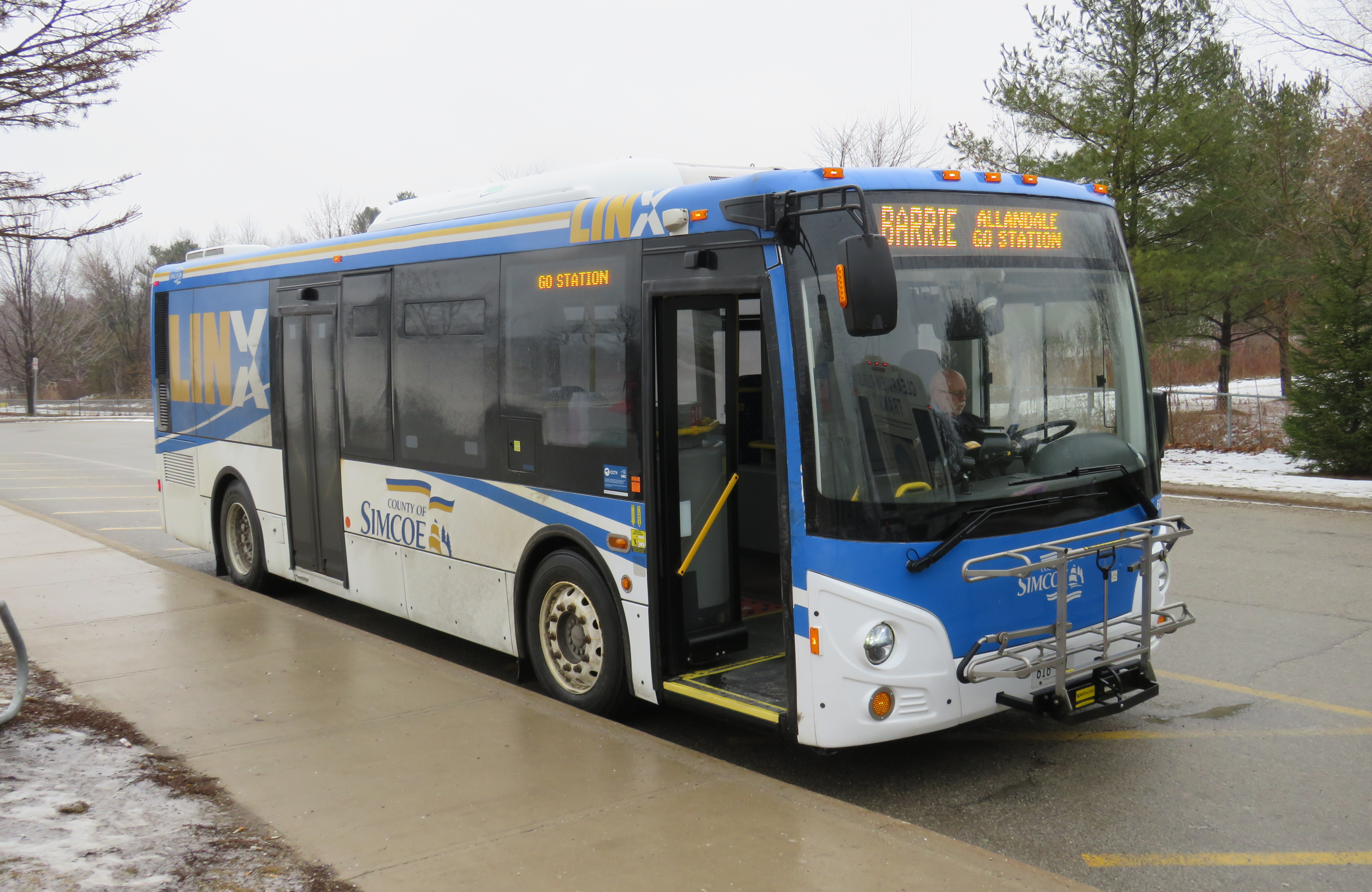
- Simcoe Linx bus #6016 in Wasaga Beach
- Commenced operation: August 7, 2018
- Headquarters: Simcoe County Administration Centre, 1110 Highway 26, Midhurst, Ontario
- Locale: Central Ontario
- Service area: Simcoe County, Ontario
- Service type: Bus service, Paratransit
- Routes: 6
- Destinations: Alliston; Angus; Barrie; Brentwood; Bradford; Downtown Collingwood; Collingwood Collegiate Institute; Collingwood Hospital; Elmvale; Georgian College Collingwood Campus; Georgian College Orillia Campus; Lakehead University Orillia Campus; Lake Simcoe Regional Airport; Midhurst; Midland; Downtown Orillia; Penetanguishene; Stayner; Wasaga Beach; Waverley; Wyebridge
- Stations: Barrie Allandale Transit Terminal; Bradford GO Station
- Fleet: Grande West Vicinity; Alexander Dennis Enviro200; Creative Carriage CS-2
- Fuel type: Diesel
- Operator: TOK Transit
- Website: simcoe.ca/residents/linx-transit/

LINX Transit (formerly Simcoe County LINX) is a public transport service in Simcoe County, Ontario, Canada LINX is an inter-community regional bus service throughout Simcoe County, connecting rural towns and townships to cities in the county such as Barrie and Orillia. Service began in 2018 with a single trial route, operating with a mixed fleet of low-floor midibuses and accessible paratransit vehicles. In August 2019, service was expanded to four routes, five routes in 2020 and six routes in August 2021.

== Overview ==
LINX is Simcoe County's inter-community regional transit service which began operations in 2018. It serves a number of communities throughout the county, as well as the separated cities of Barrie and Orillia. It is strictly a service that connects communities and does not provide local transit service in said communities across the county, but connects to a number of local bus services, namely Barrie Transit, Orillia Transit, Midland Penetanguishene Transit, Colltrans (Collingwood), and Wasaga Beach Transit. It also connects to higher-order inter-regional transit services that operate within Central Ontario, including GO Transit (the Barrie GO train line and GO bus Route 68) and Ontario Northland's Sudbury-to-Toronto motor coach route through Barrie and Orillia. However, it does not have a direct connection to Via Rail, Canada's national passenger railway, whose nearest service is at Washago station in the far north end of the county, which is a stop on the Canadian, Via Rail's transcontinental passenger service.

LINX Plus provides paratransit service. While regular LINX buses are already accessible, LINX Plus serves less-independent disabled riders, and the service follows a more flexible, door-to-door model which is typical for paratransit services.

== History ==
In 2017, the Simcoe County Council approved a 5-year, $5 million plan to create a regional transit service, which would connect existing, but fragmented, local transit services in the county, as well as communities with no existing transit service. The five proposed routes were scheduled to begin service in staggered fashion, with roughly one new route being added per year.

Detailed plans for the service occurred around the time of a 2018 conference held by the county to help decide on factors like whether or not to use a zone-based fare system, which routes to prioritize, and whether or not to implement Wi-Fi services on the buses. By this time, there were 5 proposed routes, which correspond roughly to the currently existing and planned routes, with the exception that Routes 2 and 4 were at the time planned to be a single Route 2, which would stretch from Collingwood to Barrie. The plan was based primarily around connecting pre-existing hub areas: Collingwood-Wasaga Beach, Penetanguishene-Midland, Barrie-Midhurst, and Orillia. This would allow riders to transfer to another LINX route at a hub, or to local or intercity transit.

During its first year of service, ridership on Route 1 averaged 700–800 passengers per five-day service week.

In August 2019, Routes 2 and 3 were introduced, while the already-existing Route 4 was brought under the LINX banner. This was a slightly accelerated service rollout compared to what was projected in 2017 and 2018. These routes were remarked on as useful for commuters and intercity travellers entering or exiting the region, with new destinations such Napoleon Home Comfort (which employs over 700 people) and the Allandale Waterfront GO Station, Barrie's primary intercity transit station which serves as the northern terminus for the GO Barrie line, as well as a stop for the Route 68 GO bus. The Orillia–Barrie route has a number of connection points for Orillia Transit, Barrie Transit, GO Transit, and Ontario Northland motor coach service. To encourage ridership on the new routes, free service was introduced on them from August 6 to September 2.

In August 2020, Route 5 began operating from the New Tecumseth Recreation Centre (Alliston) to the Bradford West Gwillimbury (Bradford) and in August 2021, Route 6 started operating from Midland to Orillia.

=== Future ===
In planning documents from 2018, Simcoe County transit planners indicated possible future routes which could be created by around 2023, such as a route from Alliston to Barrie (much of which would be served by Routes 2 and 5 already unless they are realigned) and an Innisfil route which would connect to the possible future GO railway station there and serve areas throughout Innisfil. Possible future routes that could be created by around 2023–2028 would include a route from Barrie to Bradford running along Ontario Highway 27 through Cookstown (roughly paralleling the GO Route 68 bus, which runs to the east) and a route from the possible future Collingwood–Wasaga Beach transit hub to Fennell, which would pass through Creemore, Lisle, Everett, Alliston, and Cookstown. Finally, potential routes planned for the distant future beyond 2028 include routes around Orillia and Bradford. Portions of some distant-future routes are now covered by current and near-future routes. Transit planners also mentioned potentially introducing a fare integration program with Metrolinx for riders transferring to GO Transit, similar to the agreement which is in place between Metrolinx and the TTC.

== Fares ==
LINX uses a zone-based fare system, resulting in cash fares of $2, $4, or $6 depending on the number of zones travelled through. Riders who use the reloadable LINX Card have an automatic 10% discount applied to their fare for adults, or 15% for students and seniors (65+). Children 5 and younger are allowed to ride for free.

== Routes ==
As of December 2024, LINX operates along the following routes:

- Route 1 – Penetanguishene / Midland to Barrie (Royal Victoria Hospital)
- Route 2 – Wasaga Beach to Barrie (Barrie Allandale Transit Terminal)
- Route 3 – Orillia to Barrie (Royal Victoria Hospital)
- Route 4 – Collingwood to Wasaga Beach
- Route 5 – Alliston to Bradford West Gwillimbury (Bradford GO Station)
- Route 6 – Midland to Orillia

== Vehicle fleet ==
The LINX fleet is composed of diesel buses from a variety of manufacturers, almost all of which were purchased through the Metrolinx Transit Procurement Initiative, through which Metrolinx, Ontario's provincial public transportation agency for the Golden Horseshoe region, coordinates procurement of transit vehicles for smaller rural and suburban transit agencies to reduce their procurement costs. The LINX fleet procurement strategy was based around a need for smaller vehicles to reflect its lower-population areas of operation, as well as the higher need for paratransit vehicles.

The fleet planned for the LINX soft service launch in August 2018 was four Grande West Vicinity midibuses, a Canadian-designed version of the fuel-efficient, mid-sized bus type often used for rural and suburban routes in Europe. The Vicinity's capacity is 25 passengers, and it can accommodate a maximum of two wheelchairs. Two Dodge Ram ProMaster cargo vans, adapted for paratransit service and rebranded as the Creative Carriage CS-2 (Community Shuttle 2), were also purchased for the start of full revenue service in September 2018. These adapted ProMasters are able to carry 7 passengers, including 3 wheelchairs. In total, 14 conventional buses and 8 specialized buses were planned to be purchased in 2018 over the 4 years to follow.

In its second procurement stage in 2019, LINX received several Alexander Dennis Enviro200 midibuses, a model common in the United Kingdom. It also received additional ProMaster/CS-2 specialized paratransit units.

In 2020, LINX received 4 more Alexander Dennis buses to accommodate Route 5 and in 2021, received 4 more Vicinity buses with the addition of Route 6.
