= Christian Island =

Island in Ontario, Canada

Coordinates: 44°50′N 80°12′W

Native name: Wendat: Gahoendoe Ojibwe: G'Chimnissing
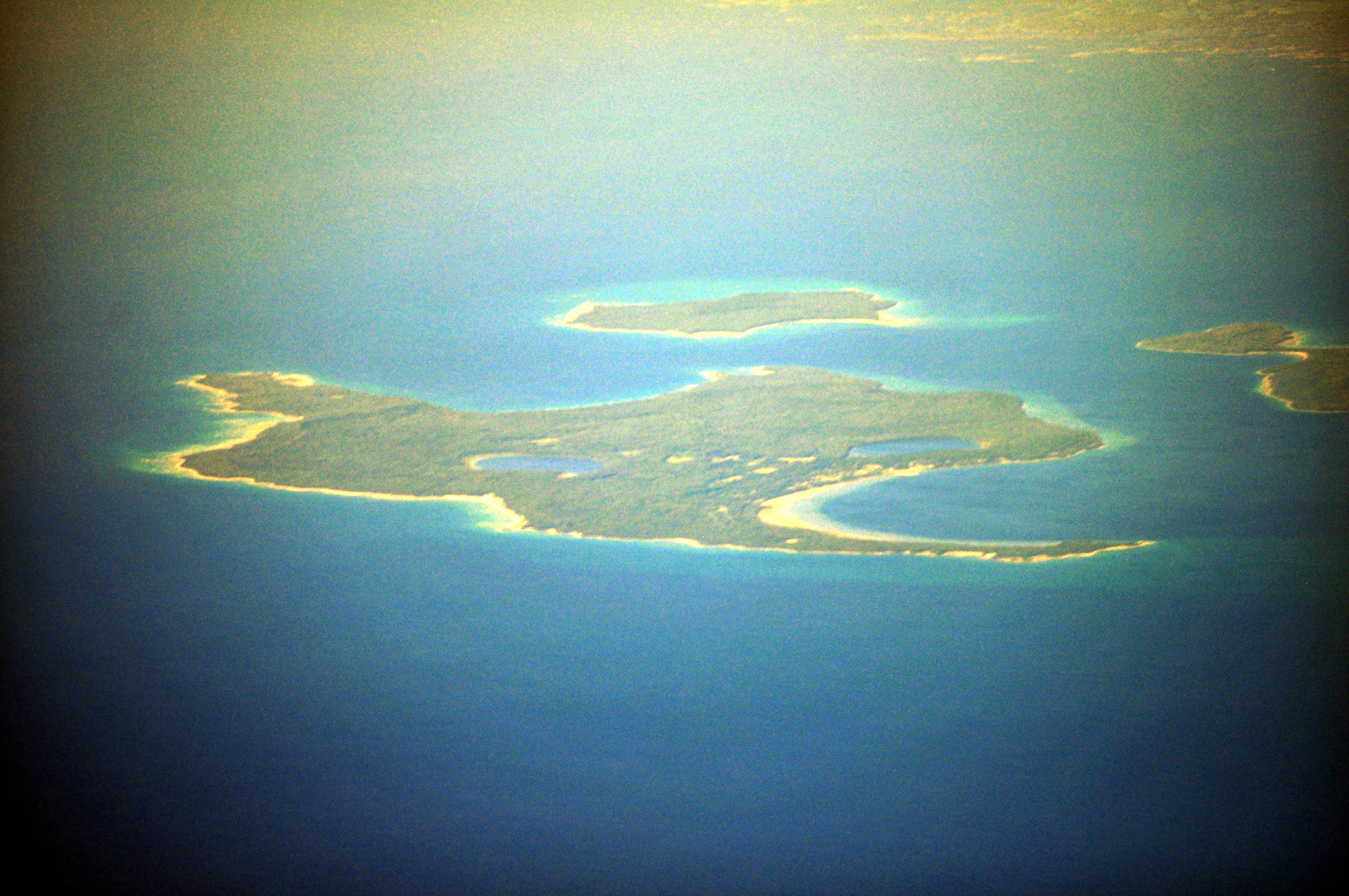
- Aerial view of Christian Island from the southeast.
- Interactive map of Christian Island

Geography
- Location: Georgian Bay, Lake Huron
- Area: 51.91 km^{2} (20.04 sq mi)
- Highest elevation: 209 m (686 ft)

Administration
- CAN
- Province: Ontario
- Region: Simcoe

Demographics
- Population: 679 (2021)
- Pop. density: 13.1/km^{2} (33.9/sq mi)

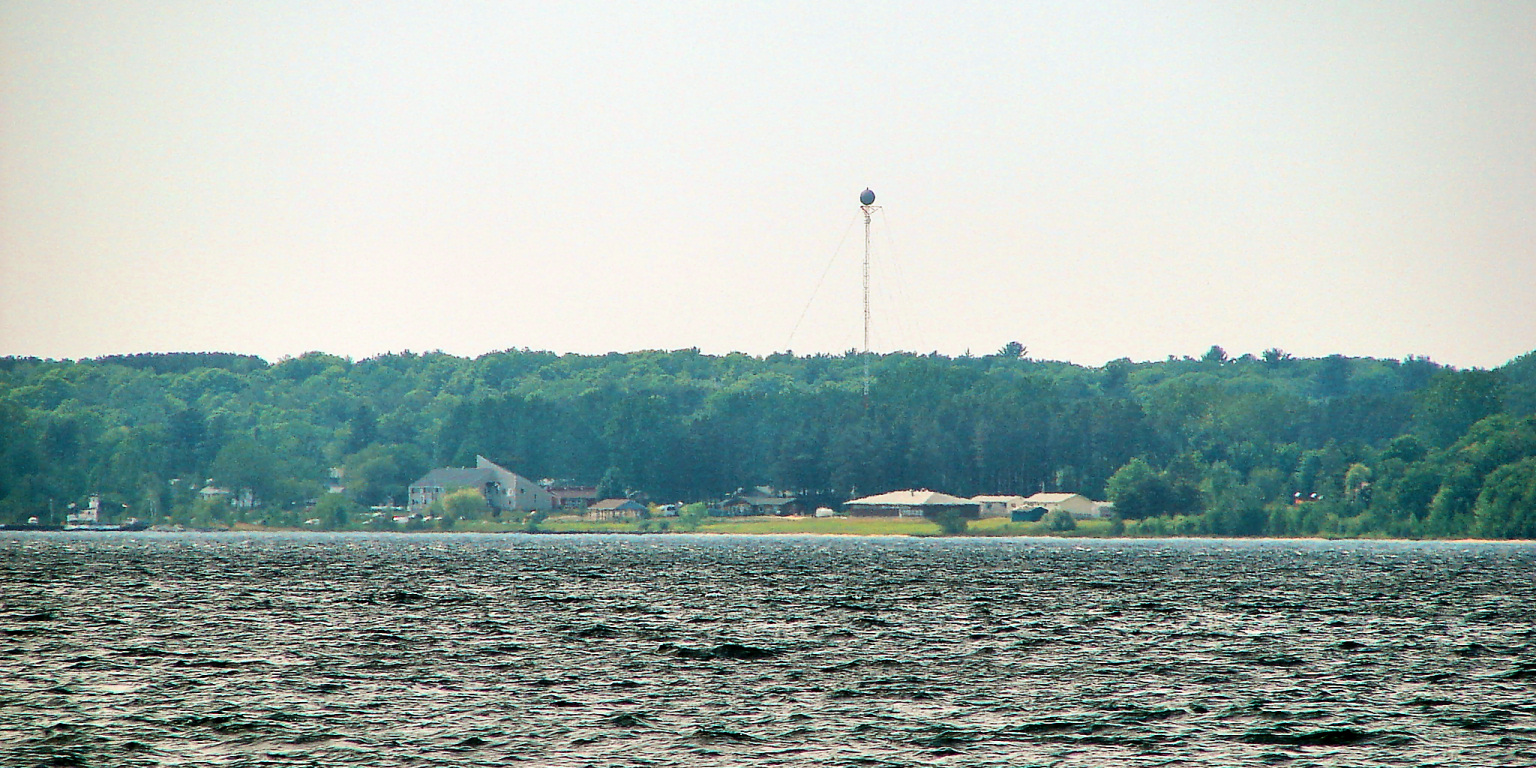
View of Christian Island from Cedar Point.

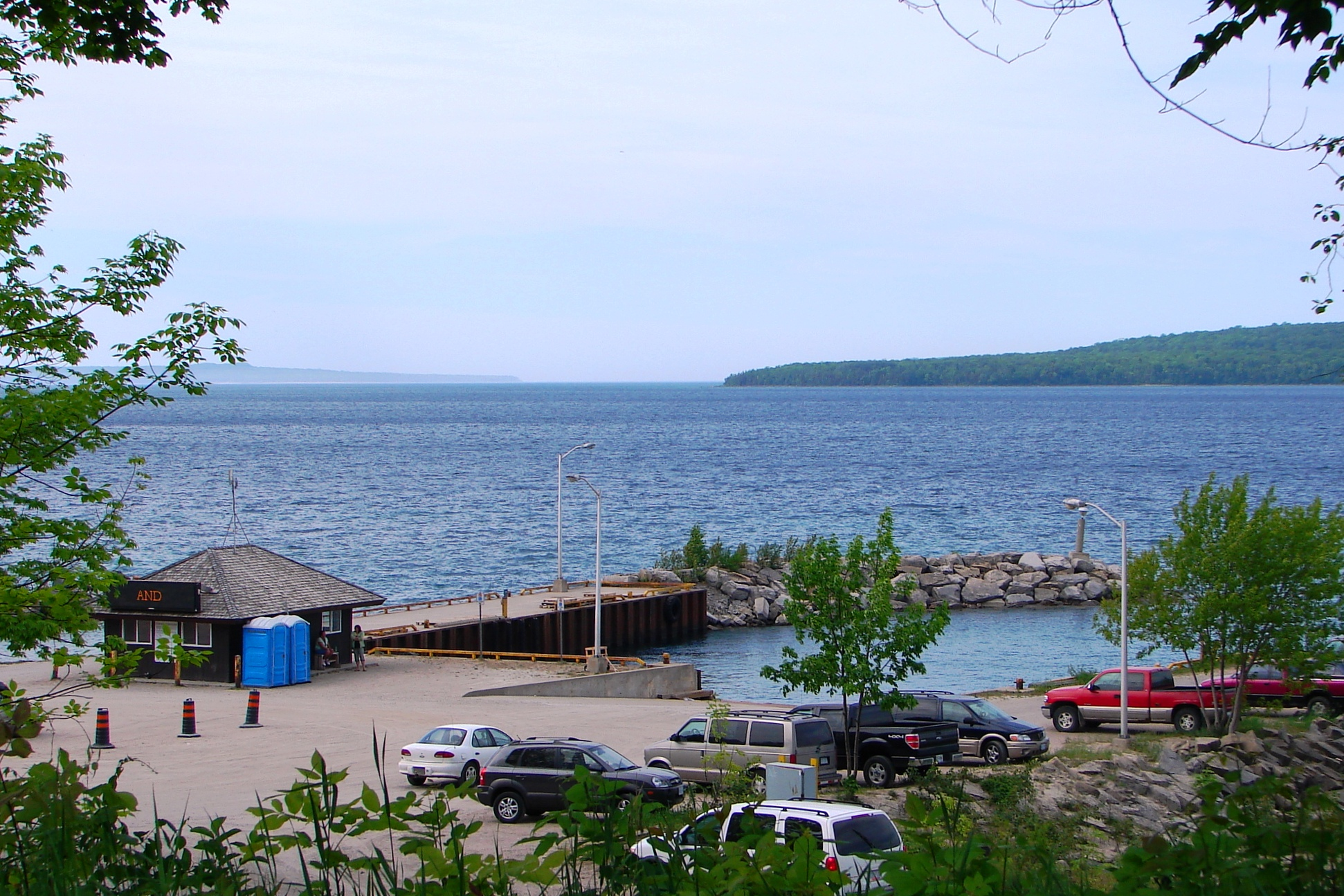
Ferry terminal in Cedar Point (Christian Island 30A IR) to Christian Island, with Beckwith Island on the right and Hope Island in the distance on the left.

Christian Island, also known to Beausoleil First Nation as Chimnissing or “Big Island,” is an island in southern Georgian Bay, Ontario, and the main community of Beausoleil First Nation. Beausoleil First Nation describes itself as the People of G’Chimnissing and states that it rests on the shores of southern Georgian Bay on Christian, Beckwith, and Hope Islands.

Christian Island, together with nearby Hope Island and Beckwith Island, forms Christian Island Indian Reserve No. 30, which the Government of Canada lists as 5,530.0 hectares and associated with Beausoleil First Nation. Beausoleil’s land base also includes Christian Island Indian Reserve No. 30A, a 7.9-hectare reserve at Cedar Point west of Midland, and an interest in the 3.1-hectare Chippewa Island reserve in Twelve Mile Bay, which is shared with the Chippewas of Georgina Island and the Chippewas of Rama First Nation. Christian Islands' highest elevation is 209 metres (686 feet) above sea level.

Christian Island is part of the Georgian Bay / Thirty Thousand Islands region. Nearby protected areas include Georgian Bay Islands National Park and Beausoleil Island National Historic Site, which Parks Canada identifies as part of the world’s largest freshwater archipelago. Parks Canada states that Georgian Bay Islands National Park is composed of 63 islands and is accessible only by boat, while UNESCO lists the Georgian Bay Biosphere Reserve as covering 347,269 hectares along the eastern coast of Georgian Bay.

The history of Beausoleil First Nation is connected to broader land and treaty issues involving the Chippewa Tri-Council and other First Nations in the region. In 2012, Beausoleil First Nation was one of the communities involved in the approval of the Coldwater–Narrows Specific Land Claim settlement, which the Government of Canada described as resolving a claim dating back more than 170 years. Beausoleil First Nation materials describe the claim as relating to the former Coldwater–Narrows reserve between present-day Orillia and Matchedash Bay.

== Natural Environment and History ==
Christian Island is the largest of the three main islands associated with Beausoleil First Nation and is the only one with a permanent community. Beausoleil First Nation materials describe G’chi Mnissing as meaning “big Island” in Anishinaabemowin, and describe the territory as including Christian Island, Beckwith Island, Hope Island, Cedar Point, Little Christian Island, the Stoney Islands, and the Watcher Islands. The island includes sand beaches, inland lakes, deciduous forest, wetlands, sand dunes, and a ridge along its northern end. Its natural features also include limestone bedrock and mainly sandy sediment associated with the former Glacial Lake Algonquin.

Christian Island is an important habitat for forked three-awned grass, also known as Ice Age grass. The species is listed as endangered in Canada and grows in dry, open, sandy habitats such as sand barrens, sandy openings, road and trail edges, and abandoned fields. Environment Canada identified Christian Island as the site of the largest known Canadian population of the species, with more than 100,000 individuals documented there in 2005.

The island was known to the Wendat as Gahoendoe and was later called Isle St. Joseph by the Jesuits before becoming known as Christian Island through nineteenth-century surveyors. In 1649, after the destruction of Sainte-Marie among the Hurons on the Wye River, Jesuit missionaries, French soldiers, and Huron-Wendat refugees relocated to the island and established Fort Sainte-Marie II. The French built a fortified mission with a stone outer wall, church, missionary quarters, and a well, while the Huron-Wendat lived in an adjacent village.

Fort Sainte-Marie II was occupied from June 1649 to June 1650. The winter of 1649–1650 was marked by severe famine, disease, and renewed threats from the Haudenosaunee. Archaeological research has described the conditions on Christian Island as extreme, with some starving Wendat refugees reportedly resorting to cannibalizing the remains of the dead. Parks Canada more generally describes the winter as one of famine and disease before the partial abandonment of Fort Sainte-Marie II in June 1650, when the Jesuits, led by Father Paul Ragueneau, and approximately 300 Huron-Wendat travelled toward Québec.

Christian Island is also the site of the Christian Island Lightstation Tower, one of the Imperial Towers built on Lake Huron and Georgian Bay. The tower was built between 1855 and 1859 under the authority of the Board of Works, Canada West, by contractor John Brown. Parks Canada describes the tower as a recognized federal heritage building and a local landmark associated with the opening of navigation on Lake Huron and Georgian Bay.

== Anishinaabeg Origins and Traditions ==
Beausoleil First Nation, also known as Chimnissing, is an Anishinaabe community with roots in the wider Great Lakes region. Its history includes the Ojibwe/Chippewas of Lakes Huron and Simcoe, as well as Potawatomi and Odawa families who became part of the Christian Island community during the nineteenth century. Community history describes this not as a single migration, but as a history of displacement, refuge, kinship, and adoption among related Anishinaabeg peoples.

n the 1830s, while the British government was carrying out the Coldwater–Narrows experiment in Upper Canada, the United States was enforcing removal policies that displaced many Anishinaabeg and other Indigenous peoples westward. Potawatomi Chief Ogemahwahjwon, remembered in English as “Chief of the flowing waters,” crossed into what is now Canada in 1835 with members of his family and community. After being directed to Coldwater, he and his people were welcomed into Chief John Assance’s band through adoption. More Potawatomi families later arrived from present-day Sheboygan, Wisconsin, and an Odawa group from the Lake Michigan region was also welcomed at Christian Island in the 1850s. Some Potawatomi families came from present-day Wisconsin, while Odawa families from around Lake Michigan were also welcomed into the Christian Island community.

After the Assance Band relocated to Christian Island in the late 1850s, Ojibwe, Potawatomi, and Odawa families lived together there for generations, although not all residents had the same treaty or annuity rights. In 1911, Christian Island Band member Henry Jackson began helping non-Treaty Potawatomi relatives seek formal admission into the band. On June 1, 1916, eligible male voters approved the admission of 62 non-Treaty Anishinabek by a vote of 54 to 10. The admitted families included the surnames King, Sandy, Sunday, Isaac, Mixemong, Toby, Copegog, Monague, and Marks. On the same day, the band also rejected a separate government proposal to surrender Hope Island and Beckwith Island.

Anishinaabe oral traditions also connect the people to the wider southern Georgian Bay landscape. Beausoleil Island, known to the Anishinaabeg as Bimadinaagogi, is described as a place of memory, gathering, ceremony, and creation stories.

In one tradition, two supernatural beings fought over a young Anishinaabe woman who gathered berries in the area; after they died, their bodies formed Beausoleil Island and Giant’s Tomb Island. The island remains closely associated with women, berry gathering, medicines, and ceremonies connected to the transition from girlhood to womanhood.

== Shipwrecks ==
Christian Island is a favourite destination for scuba divers given the close proximity of a number of old shipwrecks (most going back a century or more) near Christian Island, and near the adjacent, uninhabited Hope Island. These include: Mapledawn (North West of Christian Island), steel freighter built in 1890 and sank 1924; Saucy Jim (East of Christian Island), sank 1910; gain vessel Michigan (North West of Hope Island), sank 1843; schooner Lottie Wolf (North East of Hope Island), sank 1879; and Marquette (East of Hope Island), sank 1867. Lake Huron (in which Georgian Bay is located) is the final resting place to hundreds of other sunken vessels, many of them of great historic value. These shipwrecks are generally well preserved, owing to the cold, fresh water habitat.

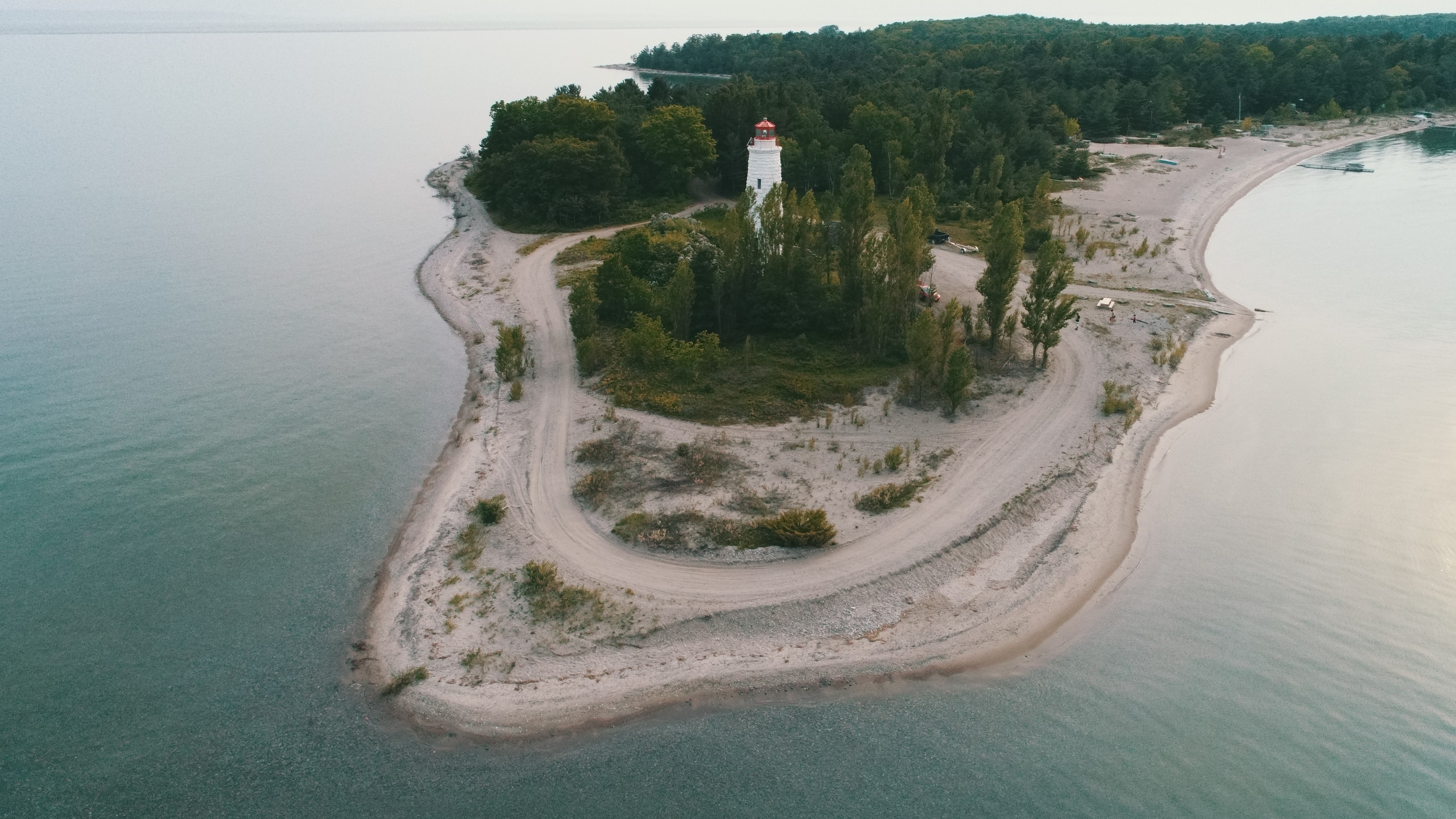
Lighthouse Point has the oldest lighthouse (b. 1859) in Georgian Bay

== Cultural & Community Events ==
=== Island in the Sun Pow Wow ===
Christian Island hosts an annual pow wow known as ''Island in the Sun'', or the G’Chimnissing Island in the Sun Pow Wow. Held on Beausoleil First Nation territory, the event brings together singers, dancers, drummers, vendors, community members, and visitors for a cultural gathering that includes Grand Entry, song, dance, and traditional ceremonies. Beausoleil First Nation community materials describe the pow wow as an annual July event on Christian Island, while Christian Island Elementary School also hosts a school pow wow in May for local students and community members.

A 2006 notice for the event referred to “New Pow-wow Grounds at Douglas Lake,” while later event listings continued to identify the site as the Christian Island Pow-wow Grounds. In 2025, former Beausoleil First Nation Chief Guy Monague, through Little Ojibway Log Construction, completed a permanent octagonal pow wow arbour in the community. The structure was described as being built at the Christian Island Pow-wow grounds for drummers to sit during pow wow events.

== Governance - Modern chiefs of Beausoleil First Nation ==
=== 2018-2021 Guy Monague ===
In accordance with Indian Act election regulations at the time, Beausoleil First Nation held their general elections every two years. The June 23, 2018 election resulted in the following:

- Chief: Guy Monague
- Chief Councillor: Joanne Sandy
- Councillor: Kristin Monague
- Councillor: Lauraine Judith Jamieson
- Councillor: Hank Monague
- Councillor: Angela Beedie
- Councillor: C. Susan Copegog

Guy Monague served as Chief of Beausoleil First Nation from 2018 through 2021, after previously serving as a Beausoleil councillor for a few terms in the 1990s. He succeeded Mary McCue-King, who was elected in 2016. McCue-King presently serves as the executive director of the Ogemawahj Tribal Council. The newly elected Chief and Council were sworn in on July 6, 2018. Since November 2016, Terra Sandy Roy has served as Youth Chief, with Lance Copegog as Deputy Youth Chief.

His leadership period included major community issues such as the Williams Treaties settlement, the Christian Island ferry replacement project, and the COVID-19 pandemic response. After leaving office, Monague returned to construction and registered Little Ojibway Log Construction in 2023, later completing community projects including a youth pavilion and a permanent pow wow arbour on Beausoleil First Nation territory.

During Guy Monague’s term as Chief, Beausoleil First Nation was one of the seven Williams Treaties First Nations involved in the 2018 negotiated settlement of the Alderville litigation. The settlement resolved long-standing issues related to the 1923 Williams Treaties, including compensation, land-related provisions, recognition of continuing treaty harvesting rights, and commitments from Canada and Ontario to issue formal apologies. Monague welcomed the settlement on behalf of Beausoleil First Nation, framing it as the conclusion of a difficult chapter connected to the treaty’s interpretation and as a step toward reconciliation and renewal for the community.

=== Leadership During Covid-19 ===
During the COVID-19 pandemic, Beausoleil First Nation also explored alternative ways to maintain access to supplies for Christian Island. In October 2020, a multi-partner drone delivery project was launched between Cedar Point and Christian Island to transport medical and hygiene supplies, mail, documents, and other essential items. The system was intended to reduce person-to-person contact during the pandemic and provide an additional supply link when ferry service could be affected by weather, rough water, or ice. Chief Guy Monague supported the initiative, noting that getting supplies to the island had long been a challenge and that the system could be important if ferry service was interrupted.

Also during the pandemic, Chief Monague oversaw emergency access restrictions on Beausoleil First Nation territory. In May 2020, after visitors attempted to access beaches on Christian Island, the First Nation expanded travel restrictions to include Cedar Point, Christian Island, Beckwith Island, and Hope Island. Monague said the measures were intended to protect the community, which had not yet recorded a COVID-19 case, while Beausoleil First Nation remained under a state of emergency. The First Nation also requested support from the Ontario Provincial Police and the Anishinabek Police Service to help patrol its territory.

=== 2021-2023 Joanne P. Sandy ===
Joanne P. Sandy became Chief of Beausoleil First Nation on June 2, 2021, succeeding outgoing Chief Guy Monague after winning the community’s election. Before becoming chief, she had served nine years as a chief councillor, and her campaign emphasized integrity, dependability, honesty, empathy, and collaboration between chief and council.

A major part of Sandy’s campaign was continuity. She said she hoped to carry forward important projects already underway, including the dock project, the new ferry, the M.V. Waaseyaagmik / Clearwater, and a new police facility. The article also notes that Sandy was elected both as chief and as one of the top six council members, which raised questions among some community members about whether she could hold both roles. The electoral officer explained that under the Indian Band Election Regulations, the next-place finisher could not simply be moved into council; a vacancy would require a byelection. The 2021 council consisted of:

- Chief: Joanne P. Sandy
- Chief Councillor: Tanya Roote-Jamieson
- Councillor: Trevor Reid
- Councillor: Whitney Walsh
- Councillor: Jane Copegog
- Councillor: Murray Sandy
- Executive Assistant: Lance Copegog

=== 2023-2027 Joanne P. Sandy ===
Beausoleil First Nation held a general election on June 1, 2023, marking its first council election under the federal First Nations Elections Act. The Act governs the election and term of office of chiefs and councillors for participating First Nations and provides for four-year terms. The 2023 election began Beausoleil First Nation’s 2023–2027 council term, with the oath of office taking place on July 7, 2023. Joanne P. Sandy continued as Chief for the new term. The newly elected council consisted of:

- Chief: Joanne P. Sandy
- Chief Councillor: Whitney Walsh
- Councillor: Marcel Monague
- Councillor: Tanya Roote-Jamieson
- Councillor: Marla Monague
- Councillor: Jake King
- Councillor: PJ Sandy

In July 2024, Sandy helped mark the opening of an assisted care home dialysis unit on Christian Island. She said the unit would reduce the need for residents to travel by ferry and road to the mainland for dialysis treatment.

In 2025, Chief Sandy was present for the unveiling of the Beausoleil Island National Historic Site plaque. Parks Canada includes her statement welcoming the designation and emphasizing Beausoleil First Nation’s ancestral relationship with Bimadinaagogi / Beausoleil Island.

A 2025 federal court affidavit notes that Chief Sandy was involved in discussions with Indigenous Services Canada and Georgina Island First Nation about whether federal remoteness measures properly account for communities connected to the mainland only by ferry.

A documented list of Chiefs/ Gimaak associated with Christian Island includes the following:

Chief / Gimaa	Term
Riley Roote	1962–1964
Leonard Monague	1964–1966
Riley Roote	1966–1968
Rodney Monague	1968–1978
Roger Jackson	1978–1980
Rodney Monague	1980–1986
Beverly / Bernard McCue	1986–1988
Rodney Monague	1988–1990
Brandon Jeffrey Monague	1990–1996
Paul C. Sandy	1996–2000
Valerie Monague	2000–2002
Paul Sandy	2002
Valerie Monague	2003–2006
Rodney Monague Jr. / Rodney Albert Monague Jr.	2006–2010
Roland Monague	2010–2016
Mary McCue-King	2016–2018
Guy Monague	2018–2021
Joanne P. Sandy	2021–present

== Infrastructure ==
=== MV Sandy Graham ===
On February 13, 2016, Canadian newspapers featured a story about the island's 65-year-old ferry, the M.V. Sandy Graham, which was purchased by the government in 1998. First Nations residents believe the aging ferry, the islands' lifeline, must be replaced in the very near future.

"Our people have to cross day-to-day to get access to all the goods and services, as well as hospitals, medical appointments. I, in good conscience, can't continue to sail this ferry knowing that tragedy could happen out on that water," Christian Island Chief Roly Monague said, according to the Canadian Press. The band council had put off regular maintenance of the ferry in an effort to ensure its replacement.

"The community is prepared to partner in order to have a new ferry, and we are obviously prepared to step up and do our part. And we know the province wants to do something as well. So we are going to make this happen," Minister Carolyn Bennett, Minister of Indigenous and Northern Affairs, commented after the meeting.

By 2017, concerns over Christian Island’s ferry service had become a major infrastructure issue for Beausoleil First Nation. Chief Mary McCue-King warned that the existing vessel was more than 60 years old and nearing the end of its service life, raising concerns that the community could be left without reliable transportation. A meeting with federal Indigenous Affairs Minister Carolyn Bennett, involving Beausoleil First Nation leadership and the Beausoleil First Nation Youth Council, helped bring renewed attention to the need for a replacement ferry.

=== New Ferry ===
In February 2019, Indigenous Services Canada announced that the Government of Canada would provide Beausoleil First Nation with up to $10 million toward the construction of a new passenger and vehicle ferry for Christian Island, along with funding for a professional project manager to oversee the vessel’s design and construction. The ferry was intended to replace the aging M.V. Sandy Graham and improve safe, reliable access between the mainland and Christian Island.

The project followed approximately 20 years of negotiations with the federal government. After Chief Guy Monague and council were elected in 2018, Beausoleil First Nation made the ferry replacement a priority. Chief Monague, who positioned the project as community-driven, not just government-driven, credited support from community members, cottagers, and Simcoe North MP Bruce Stanton with helping advance the project, saying, “What really pushed it was our members. We flooded [the Ministry of Indigenous and Northern Affairs] with letters from members and cottagers.” Beausoleil First Nation also committed $4 million from a trust fund as part of the project’s financing.

Later in 2019, Beausoleil First Nation signed an $18.8 million Canadian contract with Fraser Shipyards of Superior, Wisconsin, to build the new ferry. The custom vessel was planned to be approximately 50 metres long and 18 metres wide, with capacity for up to 150 passengers and 36 vehicles, and was designed with roll-on/roll-off access. E.Y.E. Marine Consultants of Nova Scotia was hired to manage the project. The ferry was planned as an icebreaking vessel capable of year-round service in most conditions, using diesel-electric propulsion that could later support battery-electric technology.

"We are happy that the Government of Canada is partnering with us on this important project for our community. This brand-new, purpose-built ferry will end years of uncertainty and service disruptions that we have had to endure getting to and from our homes, school, and medical appointments, and ensure that emergency transport and essential supplies are available on a reliable basis.”

— Chief Guy Monague, Beausoleil First Nation, February 15, 2019, Indigenous Services Canada

Minister of Indigenous Services Seamus O’Regan described the ferry funding as the result of extensive work and said the investment would improve transportation reliability for Beausoleil First Nation, whose members had long awaited a replacement vessel. He noted that the infrastructure would benefit both the community and visitors to Christian Island.

=== New Ferry Arrival - Niigaan Enaazhek ===
The new ferry, named "Niigaan Enaazhek", arrived at Christian Island on August 13, 2025, under the leadership of Chief Joanne Sandy after travelling from Fraser Shipyards in Superior, Wisconsin. The name was translated from Anishinaabemowin as “Shine Forward,” symbolizing progress and a bright future for the community. Chief Sandy said the vessel had “finally arrived” after being tendered in 2019, though it still needed Transport Canada safe-manning approvals before full operation. completed in 2024, the double-ended Ice Class Super 1A vessel was designed to replace the long-serving Sandy Graham and provide a more reliable year-round transportation link between Christian Island and the mainland. The new ferry increased capacity from 99 to 150 passengers and from 26 to 36 vehicles, with a maximum speed of 11.5 knots compared with 8.5 knots for the Sandy Graham. It was also engineered to break through ice up to approximately 60 centimetres thick. Its first day of service was June 5, 2026.

=== Communications - Fibre Optic ===
In 2025, Beausoleil First Nation was included in a fibre-optic broadband project intended to improve high-speed internet access for Christian Island and nearby communities. Broadband North announced that fibre-optic technology was being brought to Beausoleil First Nation with support from the governments of Canada and Ontario, with installation work requiring property access for buried wire connections. A federal contribution agreement/grant with Broadband North Inc. provided more than $7.3 million for a project to improve high-speed internet access to 621 households in the Christian Island region using fibre technology. Local reporting also noted that the project required municipal access in Tiny Township for telecommunications infrastructure along routes connecting toward Cedar Point, Sandy Bay Road, and Christian Island.

=== Williams Treatie Energy Infrastructure Participation ===
In June 2026, Beausoleil First Nation was among the seven Williams Treaties First Nations that announced a $700 million investment in Ontario Power Generation’s Darlington New Nuclear Project. The investment was connected to the development of Canada’s first grid-scale small modular reactor at the Darlington site and was described as a significant example of Indigenous participation in major energy infrastructure. The Williams Treaties First Nations chiefs, including Beausoleil First Nation Chief Joanne P. Sandy, stated that the investment did not alter or diminish Treaty or Aboriginal rights, and that the commercial investment and consultation processes had remained separate. Separately, the Michi Saagiig Anishinaabeg Nations emphasized that their ancestral and treaty lands include the Darlington project site and that their voices and interests should be meaningfully included as the project moves forward. This marks the first formal collaboration between Canada’s federal and provincial Indigenous loan-guarantee programs, and as the first First Nations equity partnership in a Canadian nuclear reactor project.

=== Social Services and Health ===
Beausoleil First Nation provides a range of community services for members on Christian Island, including education, health care, social and community services, housing, emergency services, transportation, recreation, and lands-related programs. Its social and community services include non-health supports such as income support, home support, and child welfare services, while its health services include long-term care, diabetes programming, mental health, traditional healing, and other health-related supports.

Access to health care has been an important issue for Christian Island because of its separation from the mainland by water and weather-dependent transportation. In 2006, BFN launched a telemedicine site at the Beausoleil Family Health Centre, allowing residents to consult health professionals and specialists remotely. The Beausoleil Family Health Centre later continued to provide family medical care and community-based health services combining traditional health practices with Western medical care. In 2024, Christian Island welcomed an assisted-care home dialysis unit at Beausoleil First Nation, reducing the need for residents requiring dialysis to travel by ferry and road to mainland treatment centres.

Beausoleil First Nation provides a number of youth and family services on Christian Island. Its Child and Family Services department operates a Youth Centre on O’Gemaa Miikan and lists youth programming among its programs and services. Youth-related supports are also provided through the Education Department, which oversees Christian Island Elementary School, the Beausoleil Day Care Centre, Mna Bmaadzijig, secondary and post-secondary student supports, alternative education, and the Lorna Sandy Resource Centre/Public Library. Additional child and youth supports are available through Jordan’s Principle and recreation programming, including the C.A.R.E. Fund for cultural, arts, recreation, and entertainment activities. The Beausoleil Day Care Centre has provided child-care services to the Christian Island community since July 1976. Beausoleil First Nation also provides child and family services, youth programming, and Jordan’s Principle navigation to help families access education, health, social, cultural, and special-needs supports

Housing and family safety initiatives have also formed part of the community’s social-service infrastructure. Beausoleil First Nation’s Housing Department manages rental housing, mortgage administration, maintenance, renovations, new construction, and housing programs supported by CMHC. In 2024, Beausoleil First Nation broke ground on an Indigenous Women and Children’s Shelter on Christian Island, intended to provide trauma-informed and culturally safe housing and support services for women and children affected by violence or abuse.

Services for older residents include the Guiding Lights Seniors Centre, which provides meals on wheels, transportation, adult day services, eat-in meals, and social and cultural activities for Christian Island seniors.

== Cottagers' Association ==
Christian Island has offered cottage leasing since 1956, with leased cottage lots located at Big Sand Bay, Lighthouse Point and Monague Point. Leasing is administered by the Beausoleil First Nation Lands Department, which handles lease applications, renewals, assignments, service fees, payments, and building permits. The Christian Island Cottagers’ Association, also known as CICA, represents cottage leaseholders and serves as a communication body for cottagers. Archived issues of ''The Islander'' state that CICA has represented Christian Island cottagers since 1964 and works with Beausoleil First Nation on matters affecting the cottage community.

== Notable individuals ==
Rodney Monague (1942–2013), a survivor of the Canadian Indian residential school system, was the island's first chief after the departure of Indian agents in the 1960s. He served as chief for more than two decades, from the late 1960s until around 1990.

Canadian folk singer-songwriter Gordon Lightfoot penned a song about Christian Island in 1972 (Christian Island (Georgian Bay) which includes the lyric "In the Lee of Christian Island"), alluding to the popularity of the island as a sailing area.
