= Beausoleil First Nation =

Beausoleil First Nation G'Chimnissing
- First Nations reserve
- Christian Island Indian Reserve No. 30
- Nickname: Chimnissing
- Motto: Pride Unity Strength Vision
- Location within Southern Ontario
- Coordinates: 44°50′10″N 80°11′50″W
- Country: Canada
- Province: Ontario
- District: Simcoe
- First Nation: Beausoleil

Government
  - Type: Band Government
  - Chief: Joanne Sandy

Area
  - Land: 27.45 km^{2} (10.60 sq mi)

Population (2016)
  - Total: 614
  - Density: 11.7/km^{2} (30/sq mi)
- Website: www.chimnissing.ca

Beausoleil First Nation (Ojibwe: G'Chimnissing) is an Ojibwe First Nation band government located in Simcoe County, Ontario, Canada. The main settlement of the Beausoleil First Nation is on Christian Island, Ontario, Canada in southern Georgian Bay. As of 2018, the total number of status Native Americans registered with the First Nation is 2,587. The on-reserve population is 614.

== Reserve lands ==
The Beausoleil First Nation occupies three Indian reserves. Their main First Nations Reserve is the Christian Island 30 Indian Reserve, consisting of Christian Island, a large island in Georgian Bay close to the communities of Penetanguishene and Midland, Ontario, along with two nearby smaller islands, Hope Island, and Beckwith Island - both uninhabited. Together with the 7.5 hectares (18.5 acres) Christian Island 30A Indian Reserve located at Cedar Point, Ontario and the shared 3.1 hectares (7.7 acres) Chippewa Island Indian Reserve located in Twelve Mile Sound, 27.5 kilometres (17.1 mi) north of Christian Island, they form the land base for the Beausoleil First Nation.

== Governance ==
The First Nation elects their leadership through the Indian Act for a two-year term. The First Nation's council consists of a chief and six councillors. The current chief is Joanne Sandy. The First Nation is a member of Ogemawahj Tribal Council, a regional Chiefs' council, and the Assembly of First Nations.

== Services ==
- Administration
  - Communications
  - Information Technology
  - Human Resources
  - Purchasing
- Education
- Public Works
  - Waste Management
  - Roads Maintenance
  - Chimnissing N'biish Gamig
- Housing
- Social Services
  - Child and Family services
  - Christian Island Latchkey Program
  - Christian Island Youth Services
  - Guiding Lights Seniors Centre
- Lands Management
- Transportation
- Economic Development
- Health Services
- Emergency Medical Services
- Fire Department
- Christian Island United Church
