= Simcoe County Council =

Simcoe County Council is the governing body for Simcoe County, in Ontario, Canada.

The council consists of the Warden, Deputy Warden, and County Councillors (a total of 32), who represent the sixteen municipalities within the county. The council posts or council meetings.

There are six county departments: Engineering, Planning and Environment, Statutory and Cultural Services, Corporate Performance, Health and Emergency Services, Social and Community Services, and the Chief Administrative Office and Warden.

== 2014-2018 County Council ==
Councillor	Municipality	Notes
Gerry Marshall	Warden / Mayor - Penetanguishene	2010–2018 County Councillor (resigned in August 2018) 2014 Elected Warden
Anita Dubeau	Deputy Mayor - Penetanguishene	2014–present County Councillor 2000-2010 County Councillor
Terry Dowdall	Deputy Warden / Mayor - Essa	2004–present County Councillor 2014 Elected Deputy Warden
Sandie Macdonald	Deputy Mayor - Essa	2010–present County Councillor
Gord Wauchope	Mayor - Innisfil	2014–present County Councillor
Lynn Dollin	Deputy Mayor - Innisfil	2014–present County Councillor
Bill French	Mayor - Springwater	2014–present County Councillor
Don Allen	Deputy Mayor - Springwater	2014–present County Councillor
Mike Burkett	Mayor - Severn	2010–present County Councillor
Judith Cox	Deputy Mayor - Severn	2000–present County Councillor
Brian Smith	Mayor - Wasaga Beach	2014–present County Councillor
Nina Bifolchi	Deputy Mayor - Wasaga Beach	2014–present County Councillor
Christopher Vanderkruys	Mayor - Clearview	2014–present County Councillor
Barry Burton	Deputy Mayor - Clearview	2014–present County Councillor
Basil Clarke	Mayor - Ramara	2008–present County Councillor
John O'Donnell	Deputy Mayor - Ramara	2014–present County Councillor
Scott Warnock	Mayor - Tay	2003–present County Councillor
Bill Rawson; Dave Ritchie	Deputy Mayor - Tay	2006-2016 County Councillor (resigned in September 2016); 2016-present County Councillor
Gord McKay	Mayor - Midland	2010–present County Councillor
Mike Ross	Deputy Mayor - Midland	2014–present County Councillor
Sandra Cooper	Mayor - Collingwood	2006–present County Councillor
Brian Saunderson	Deputy Mayor - Collingwood	2014–present County Councillor
Harry Hughes	Mayor - Oro-Medonte	2006–present County Councillor
Ralph Hough	Deputy Mayor - Oro-Medonte	2008–present County Councillor
Rob Keffer	Mayor - Bradford West Gwillimbury	2014–present County Councillor
James Leduc	Deputy Mayor - Bradford West Gwillimbury	2014–present County Councillor
Mary Small Brett	Mayor - Adjala-Tosorontio	2010–present County Councillor
Doug Little	Deputy Mayor - Adjala-Tosorontio	2014–present County Councillor; 2003-2010 County Councillor
Rick Milne	Mayor - New Tecumseth	2014–present County Councillor
Jaime Smith; Donna Jebb	Deputy Mayor - New Tecumseth	2014–2017 County Councillor (died in August 2017); 2017-present County Councillor
George Cornell	Mayor - Tiny	2010–present County Councillor
Steffen Walma	Deputy Mayor - Tiny	2014–present County Councillor
