= Beckwith Island =

Island in Ontario, Canada

Coordinates: 44.8568°N 80.1125°W

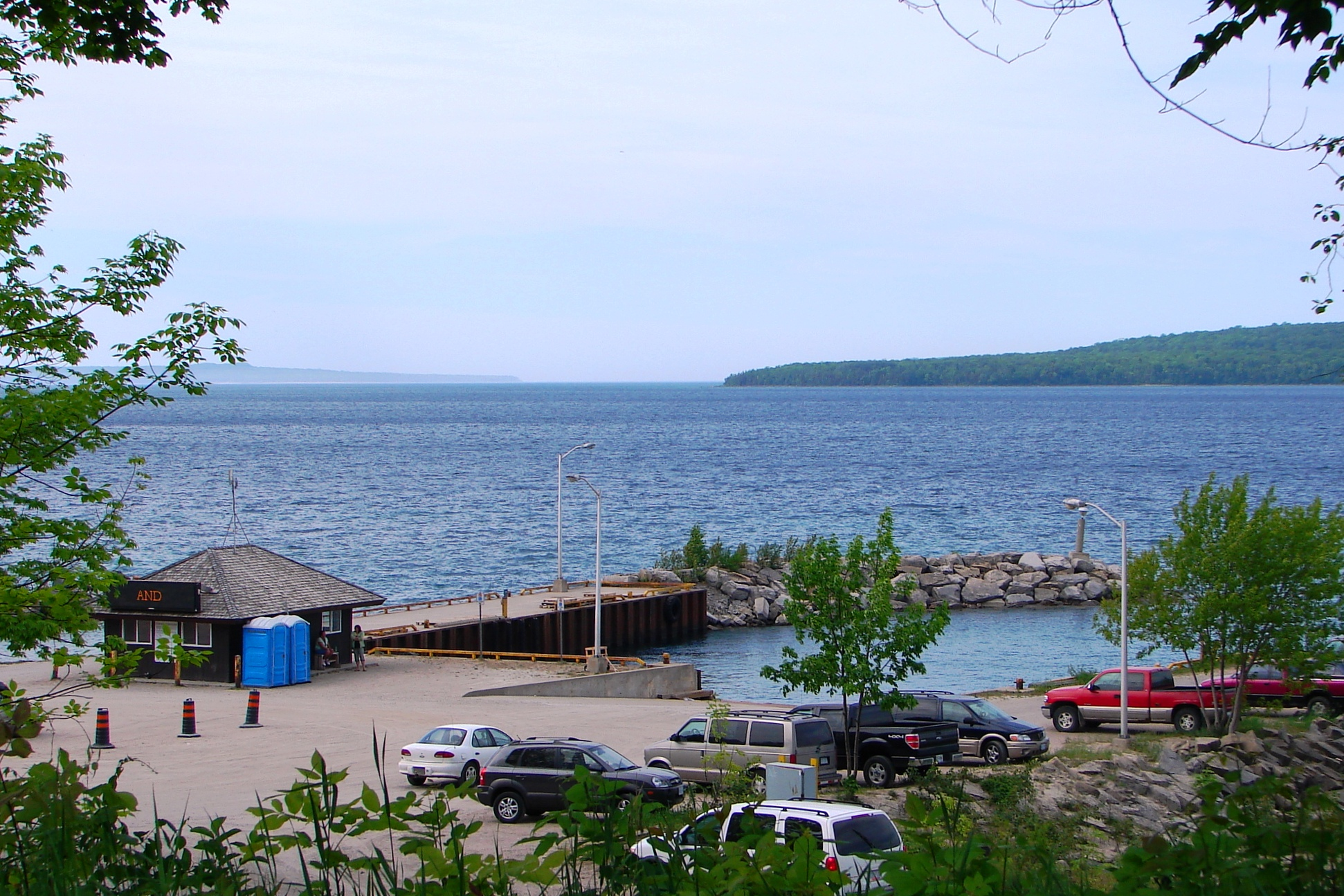
Ferry terminal in Cedar Point (Tiny, Ontario) to Christian Island, with Beckwith Island on the right.

Beckwith Island (French: Île Ronde) is the eastern of three islands in southeastern Georgian Bay in Ontario, Canada. Beckwith Island and the attached "Little Beckwith" are part of the Beausoleil First Nation.

== Geography ==
The island's highest elevation is 226 meters (741 feet) above sea level. Like its populated neighbour Christian Island to the west, and Hope Island to the northwest, the uninhabited island is part of an Ojibwa reserve. On the mainland, Cedar Point lies directly south of the island and Thunder Beach is located to the southeast of Beckwith Island.

== Flora and fauna ==
The island is an ecologically sensitive island of over 800 acres (324 ha), featuring sandy beaches and dunes, juniper bushes, as well as the rare and protected three-pronged awn grass, plus forests of oak, maple, birch and conifer trees and no development of any kind except for simple outhouses to serve boaters, campers and picnickers.

== Accessibility ==
Beckwith Island is undeveloped, though there are two boat anchorage points. One on the north and another on the south side of the islands where the narrows of the two islands meet. Sandy beaches are at both anchorage points.
