= Christian Island 30 =

- Indian reserve
- Christian Island Indian Reserve No. 30
- Location within Southern Ontario
- Coordinates: 44°51′N 80°11′W
- Country: Canada
- Province: Ontario
- District: Simcoe
- First Nation: Beausoleil

Area
  - Land: 52.13 km^{2} (20.13 sq mi)

Population (2011)
  - Total: 1,249
  - Density: 24/km^{2} (62/sq mi)
- Website: www.chimnissing.ca

Christian Island 30 is a First Nations reserve located on Christian Island in Georgian Bay, in Ontario. It is one of the reserves of the Beausoleil First Nation.

Beausoleil First Nation have resided on the island since 1856.
