= Hope Island (Ontario) =

Island in Simcoe County, Ontario, Canada

Coordinates: 44°54′18″N 80°10′49″W

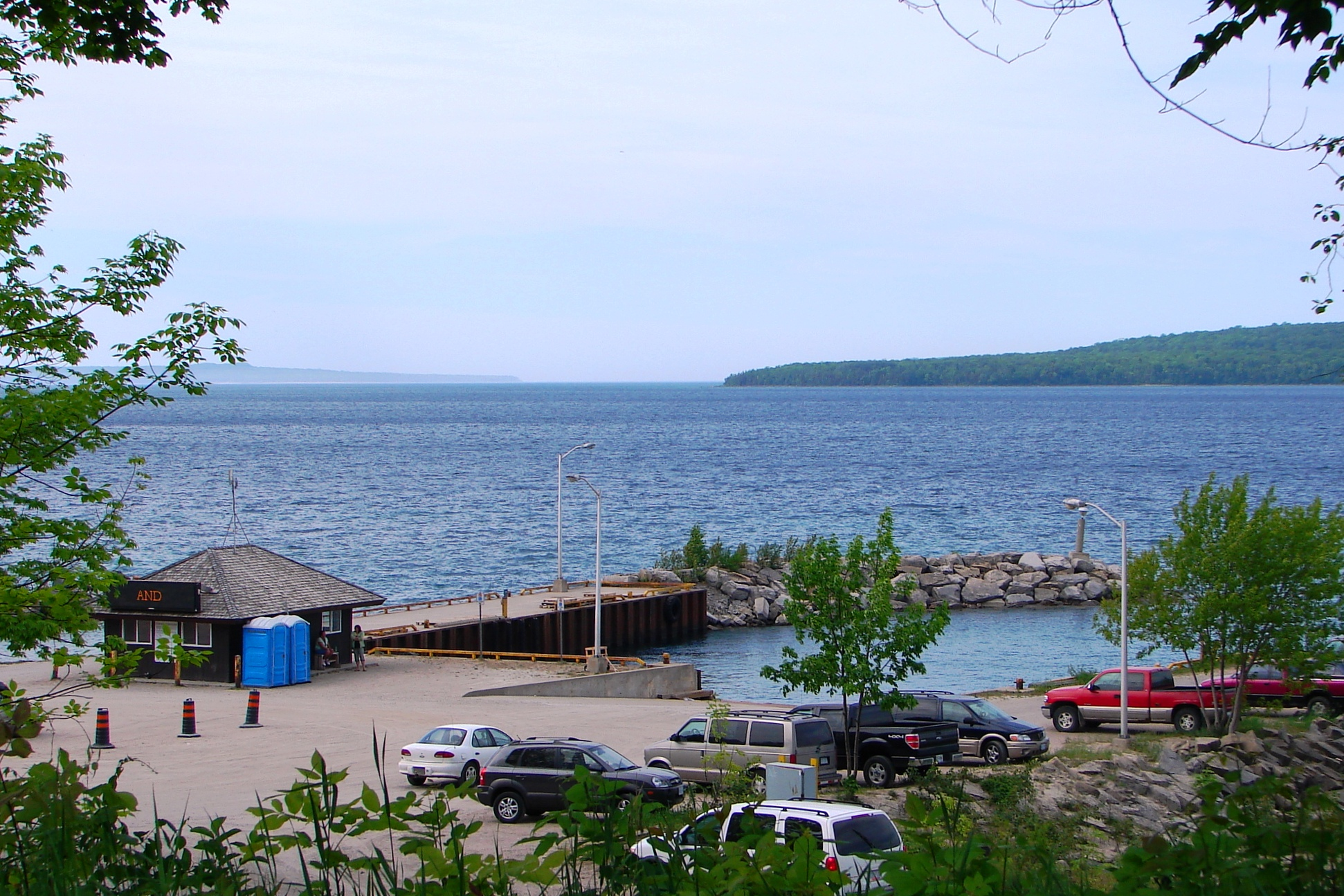
Ferry terminal in Cedar Point (Tiny, Ontario) to Christian Island, with Hope Island left on the horizon.

Hope Island (French: Île au Géant) is the northernmost of three islands in southeastern Georgian Bay in the Canadian province of Ontario. It has an elevation of 187 meters (613 feet) above sea level and is currently uninhabited and not presently slated for development. It was named by Henry Bayfield after he surveyed it in the 19th century. Like its neighbours, Beckwith Island and Christian Island, the uninhabited island is part of the Beausoleil First Nation.

== Hope Island Lighthouse ==
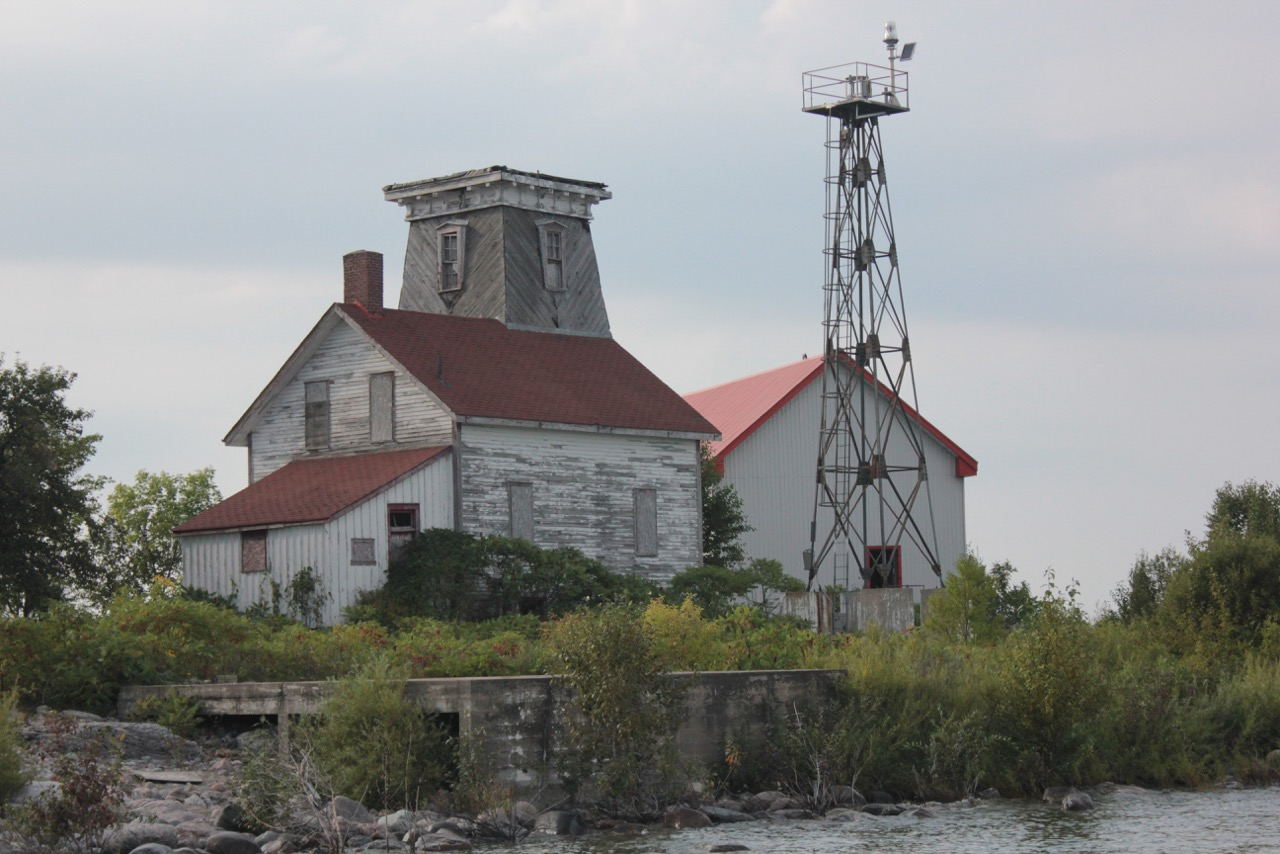
Hope Island Lighthouse, Sep. 2015

In 1884, a lighthouse was placed on the northwest side of the island. Despite this there are a number of wreck sites off the island.
