= Christian Island 30A =

- Indian reserve
- Christian Island Indian Reserve No. 30A
- Location within Southern Ontario
- Coordinates: 44°49′N 80°07′W
- Country: Canada
- Province: Ontario
- District: Simcoe
- First Nation: Beausoleil

Area
  - Land: 0.11 km^{2} (0.042 sq mi)

Population (2016)
  - Total: 42
  - Density: 395.1/km^{2} (1,023/sq mi)
- Website: www.chimnissing.ca

Christian Island 30A is a First Nations reserve in Simcoe County, Ontario. It is one of the reserves of the Beausoleil First Nation. It had a population of 42 in the 2016 Census, up from 36 in the 2011 Census.
