= Wasaga Beach Transit =

Public transport system in Ontario, Canada

- Founded: 2008
- Headquarters: 30 Lewis Street
- Locale: Wasaga Beach
- Service type: bus service
- Routes: 2
- Fleet: 4 minibuses
- Operator: Sinton-Landmark
- Website: wasagabeach.com/transit

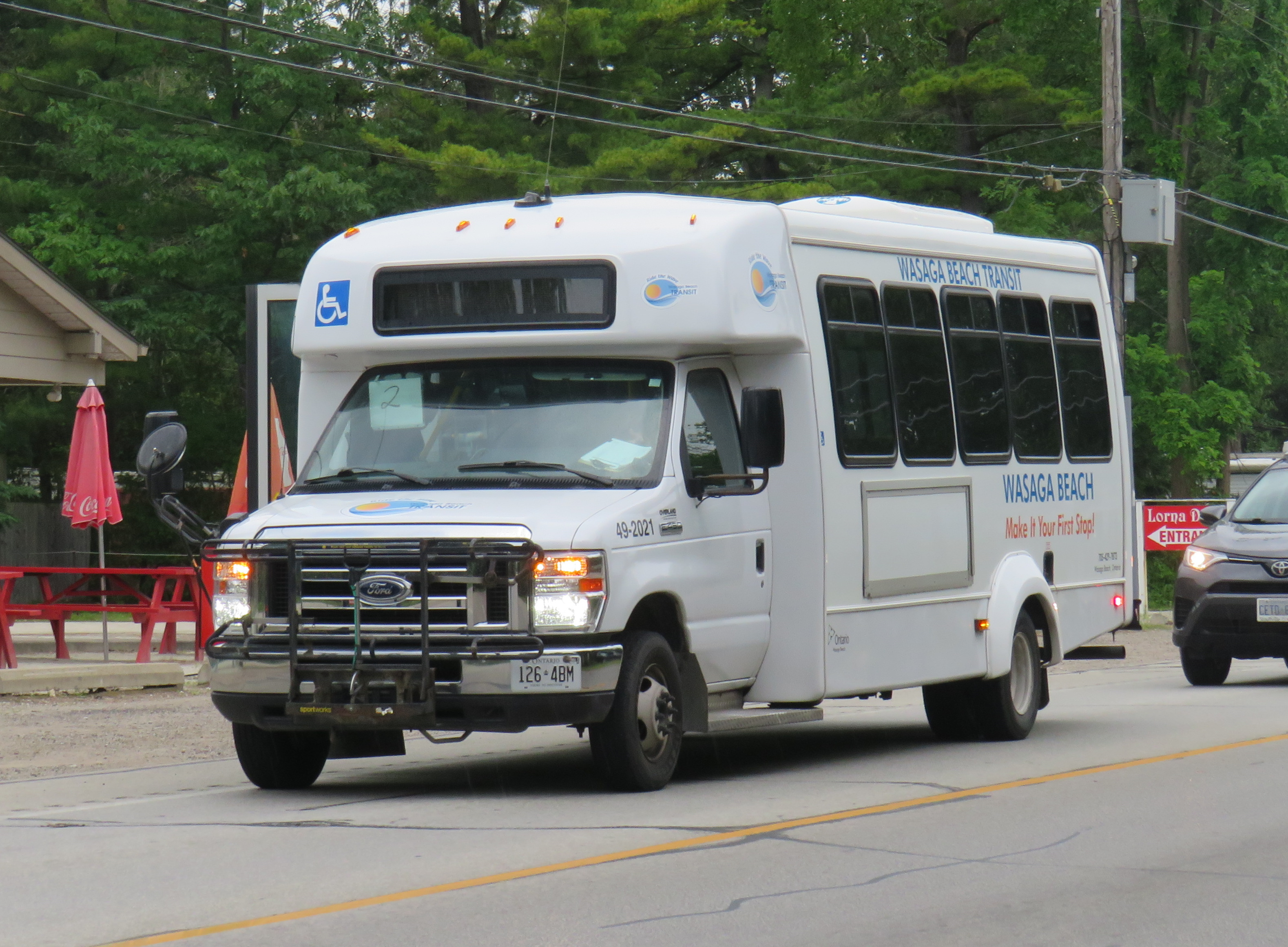
Wasaga Beach Transit Bus #49-2021, one of four buses used for the transit system, on Route 2 at 70th Street in June 2024.

Wasaga Beach Transit is a public transportation system for the resort town of Wasaga Beach, Ontario, Canada. Using municipally owned minibuses, it was originally operated by Georgian Coach Lines from 2008 to 2014 and then contracted to Sinton-Landmark. Service expanded from one route which was started in July, 2008 to two in the summer of 2009, because the bus system grew faster than anyone expected. On November 21, 2016, Wasaga Beach Transit got a connection with the new Clearview Public Transit, which runs to the nearby community of Stayner, and on August 6, 2019, the service also received a connection with the also-new Simcoe County LINX system. The latter change replaced the old Collingwood-Wasaga Link bus running between Wasaga Beach and Collingwood, and also provides transit service to the City of Barrie.

Services for Wasaga Beach Transit operate in a loop from the old Wasaga Stars Arena to 70th Street every hour from 7 AM to 9 PM, running eastbound and westbound. On November 6, 2023, the portion of Route 1 between Walmart and Archer Road was changed to an on-demand service format, with booking required in advance.

When the service was introduced in 2008, the Town of Wasaga Beach held a contest to help design the logo for the transit system. A logo depicting a sun and a wave with the slogan 'Ride the Wave' was chosen as the contest winner.

In 2024, for the Town of Wasaga Beach's 50th anniversary, a new permanent decor consisting of beach-themed wraps and (during the summer months) roof-mounted surfboards, was first applied to buses #146 and #147.

== Bus routes ==
- Route 1 - Walmart to the Wasaga Playtime Casino (On-demand service extends east to Archer Road)
- Route 2 - (Old) Wasaga Stars Arena to 70th Street

The town is also served by two Simcoe County LINX routes: Wasaga Beach to Collingwood (#4) or Barrie (#2); and Clearview Public Transit, all which connect at the Real Canadian Superstore. There are no free transfers to/from Wasaga Beach Transit with these services.

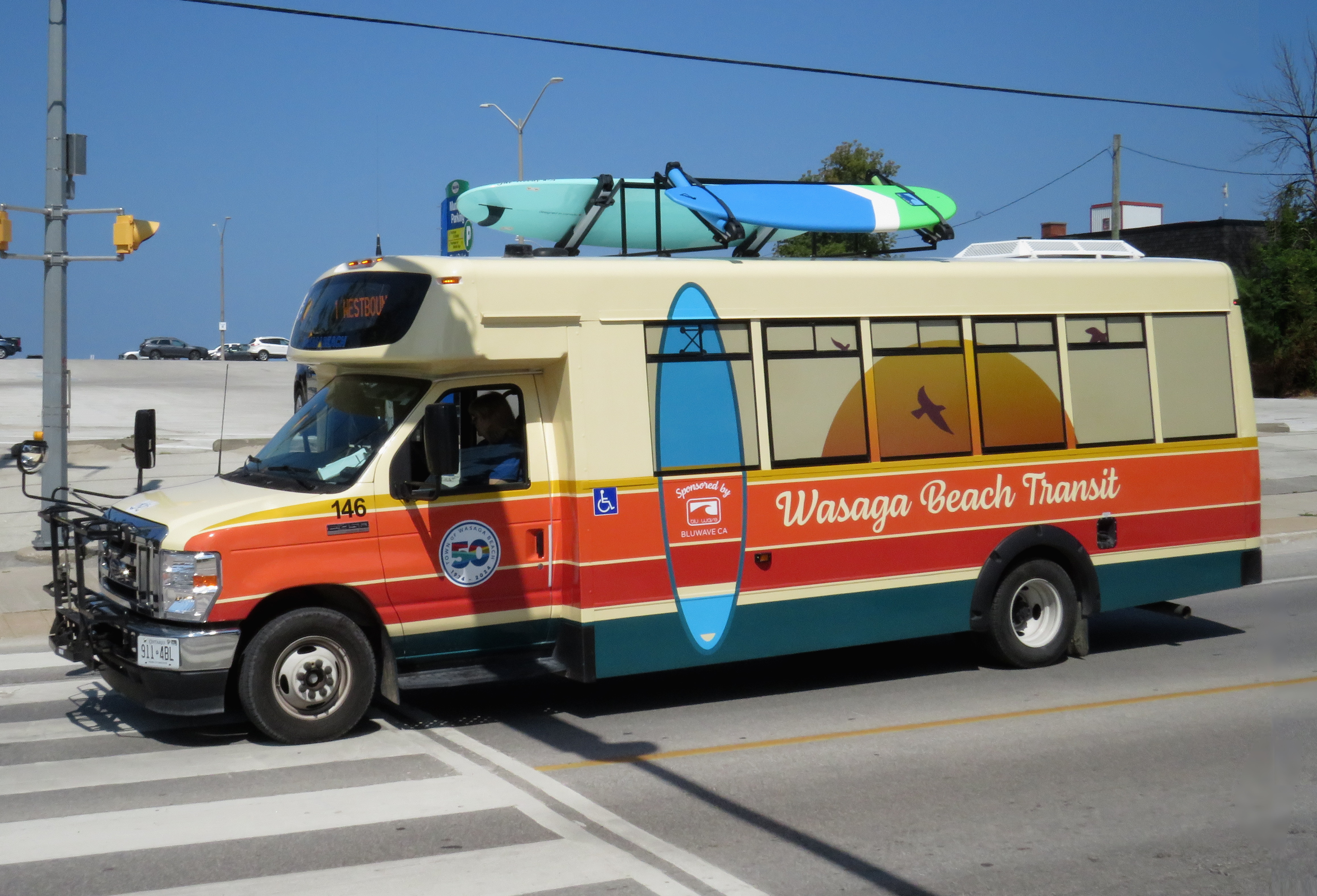
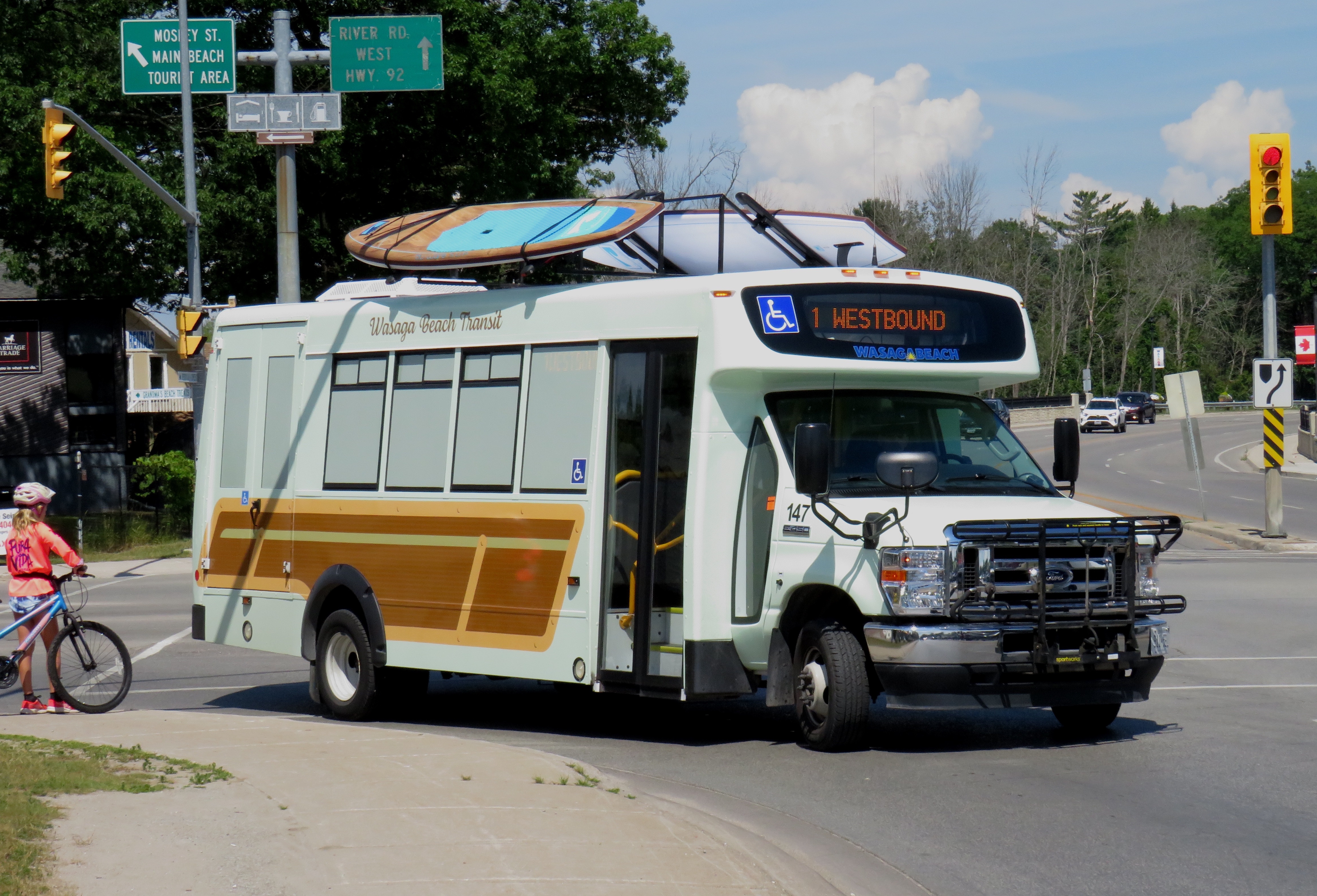
Buses #146 and #147 at Beach One and near Riverbend Plaza, respectively, sporting the beach-themed motif first used in 2024 for the Town of Wasaga Beach's 50th Anniversary, in the summer of that year

== See also ==
- Public transport in Canada
