= Orillia Transit =

Transit bus authority for the city of Orillia, Ontario

Coordinates: 44°36′30″N 79°25′11″W

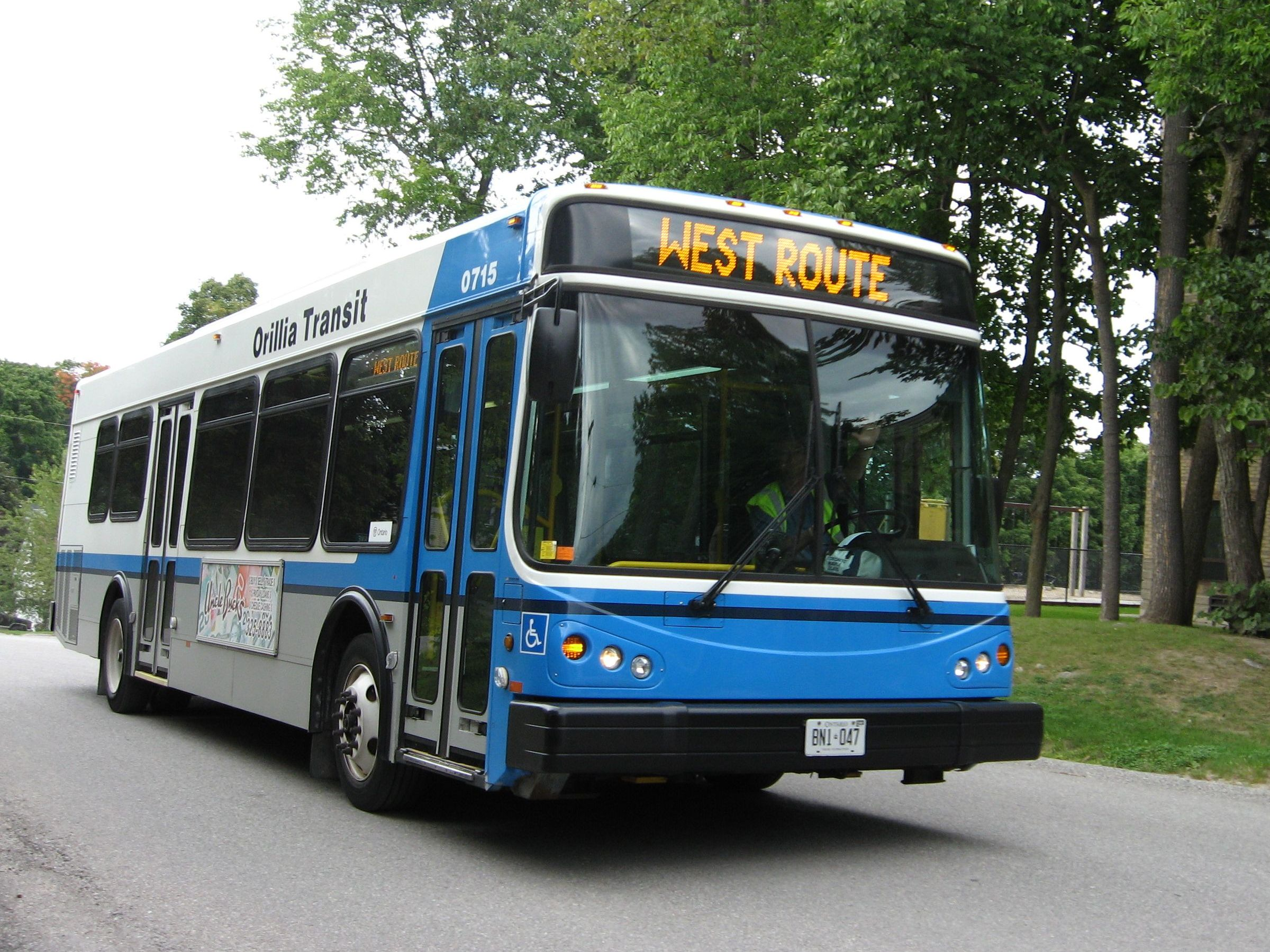
- Founded: 1975
- Headquarters: 445 Laclie St.
- Locale: Orillia, Ontario
- Service area: Urban area
- Service type: Bus service, Paratransit
- Routes: 5
- Fleet: 10 buses
- Operator: TOK Transit
- Website: Orillia Transit

Orillia Transit is operated by TOK Transit under contract to the City of Orillia in central Ontario, Canada. TOK Transit provides drivers, maintains the vehicles and supplies fuel. Service is provided on six routes throughout the city every day except statutory holidays, and one weekday special industrial area service. All of these routes run on loops which depart and end at the downtown bus terminal on West Street and Mississaga Street.

Orillia has had transit service since the 1950s when a private operator, Orillia Transportation Company, started to provide local bus service to the city. Responsibility for the service was assumed by the city in 1975 and in 1978 a specialized transit service for persons with disabilities was introduced.

== Services ==
=== Scheduled routes ===
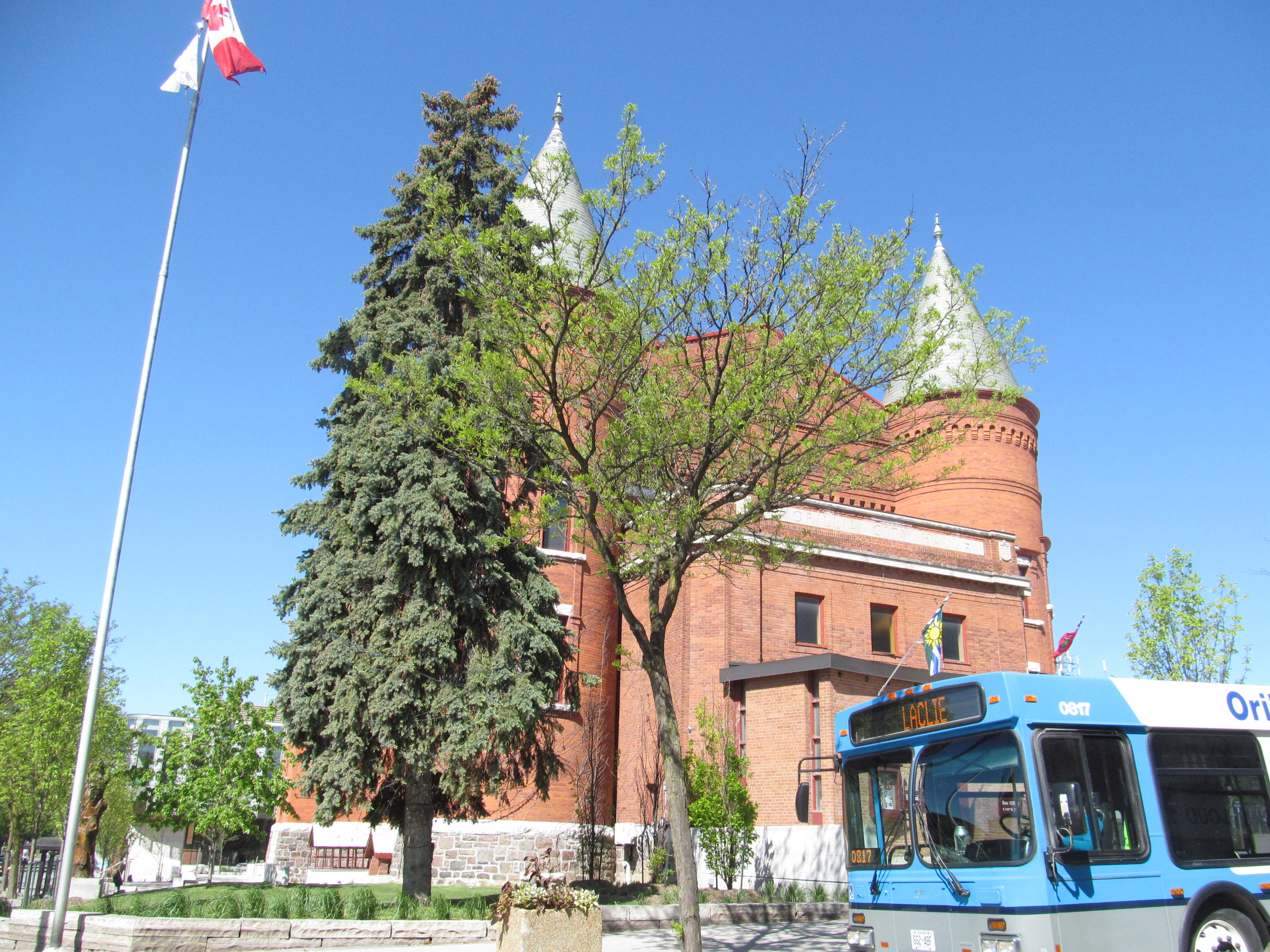

Buses operate on one way loops out and back from West Street and Mississaga Street in downtown. Each route varies on alternate trips to cover a slightly different portion of the service area and still maintain a half-hourly frequency. Each bus departs the downtown terminal every 15 and 45 minutes past the hour. As of 2022, the one-way bus fare is $2.80, including transfers at the downtown terminal. You are also able to obtain monthly, group and cOnnect passes if you are a frequent rider.

- North - serves West Street North, Orillia Square Mall, Coldwater Road
- Laclie - serves Front Street North, Laclie Street, Bay Street
- South - serves Colborne Street East, Front Street South, West Street South
- Georgian - serves Mississauga Street West, Barrie Road, Memorial Avenue, O.P.P. Central Headquarters, Huronia Regional Centre, Georgian College, Colborne Street West
- West Ridge via Coldwater Road - serves Coldwater Road, Walmart, West Ridge Boulevard, Lakehead University, Old Barrie Road
- West Ridge via Old Barrie Road - serves Old Barrie Road, West Ridge Boulevard, Coldwater Road

=== OWLS ===
Orillia Wheelchair Limousine Service is Orillia's special needs busing service for persons who have "physical mobility limitations" and are unable to use traditional public transit.

== See also ==
- Public transport in Canada
