= PS Waubuno =

Side-wheel paddle steamer

History
- Name: Waubuno
- Owner: Georgian Bay Transportation Company
- Builder: Melancthon Simpson, Port Robinson
- Completed: 1865
- Fate: Lost in a storm on 22 November 1879 with all hands

General characteristics
- Tonnage: 193 tons
- Length: 135 feet
- Installed power: Steam
- Propulsion: Paddle steamer

Waubuno was a side-wheel paddle steamer that conveyed passengers and freight between Collingwood and Parry Sound in the 1860s and 1870s. She sank with all hands during a gale on November 22, 1879 (probably around 10 a.m.), though the exact cause of her sinking is unknown.

Waubuno was built by Melancthon Simpson at Port Robinson in 1865 for J. & W. Beatty and Company, and was later owned by the Georgian Bay Transportation Company. Her main purpose was to run passengers and freight from the Northern Railway's railhead at Collingwood to places further north, including Parry Sound and Thunder Bay. She advertised "Cheap Pleasure Excursions", specifically a trip that was "short, attractive and cheap. Freight and passengers carried at the lowest rates".

Her name was derived from Algonquin and means "black magician" or "sorcerer".

== Last voyage ==
=== Background ===
As of October 1879, the Georgian Bay Transportation Company planned to replace the Waubuno with a boat with "more modern engines and boiler" in time for the spring 1880 season. So by November 1879, the aging Waubuno was finishing its final season of cheap pleasure excursions. According to a 24 November report (two days after the boat sank), the Waubuno was "by many considered quite unfit for the route, especially at this season of the year". According to a 12 December report, the boat was equipped with the same false sides that had been installed in 1865 to make the boat "seaworthy at all", and "the boat was leaking badly and had to be pumped while lying at the dock the Sunday before her loss, in fact that during Saturday night the water got up to the fire hole. The Captain stated... that he was afraid to put her out in heavy weather as she was not fit; the engines are also said to have been in very bad condition."

=== Departure ===
The trip was likely to be the last voyage the ship could make before ice made future trips impossible for the winter. The ship, skippered by George Plumpton Burkitt, had been trying to leave the southern Georgian Bay town of Collingwood, Ontario since November 18, 1879, but snow and fierce winds had kept the ship in port. The ship set off during a break in the weather at 4 a.m. on Saturday November 22 with 24 crew and passengers and a "heavy load" / "heavily laden" with $10,000 of freight.

The ship was last spotted afloat near Christian Island (35 km north of Collingwood and 60 km south of her destination of Parry Sound, on her regular course) by the island's lighthouse keeper who noted that the ship was faring well. Winds intensified during the day and the ship probably sank between 9 a.m. and 11 a.m. The Steamer Magnettawan left later on the same morning as Waubuno and after sheltering overnight at Christian Island, arrived at Parry Sound November 24, never having spotted the other ship.

== Search and speculation ==
When Waubuno failed to turn up at her destination, the tug Millie Grew was sent out to look for the paddle steamer. She returned to report that they had found a portion of the wreck. A contemporary article on the disaster from the Parry Sound North Star says that the crew of Millie Grew

...could find no trace of the crew, but picked up several articles that they knew belonged to the missing vessel, consisting of a metallic life boat turned bottom up and stove in at both ends, a life-preserver with the ships name on it, several articles of furniture out of the cabin, the ships ledger, and a part of the paddle Box with the letters W.A. on it. Barrels of apples, flour, and different articles of freight were distributed along the shore in abundance.

Another article stated similarly and added that "everything goes to show that she is literally torn to pieces". No bodies were ever recovered.

In the days after the accident, some speculated that after the Waubuno passed Christian Island, "she then directed her course towards Moose Deer Point [northeast of Christian Island on the eastern shore of Georgian Bay], in order to get into shelter as soon as possible. But unfortunately she never reached it. It was blowing a living gale, and a blinding snow falling at the same time, and owing to her very heavy load, and as swell after swell struck her, it is very reasonable to suppose foundered." Two captains working that weekend speculated respectively that "the steamer foundered not far from Lone Rock [25 km southwest of Parry Sound, where] the force of the waves under her guards parted her and she filled with water", or, "she struck one of the rocks belonging to the [Western Islands]", 35 km southwest of Parry Sound. Others claimed that "The supposition is that with the heavy load and the gale... a wave struck her and stove in her hold after filling her hold with water and thus causing her to sink at once [and] from the point where the portions of the wreck have been found, and the direction of the prevailing winds, [this probably occurred] only some six or seven miles south of the Western Islands on her regular course". Somewhat in contradiction with guesses made about what happened to her... in more recent times divers have discovered her anchors and windlass on the bottom off Haystack Rock, and her engine inshore of them. Clearly she had tried to come to anchor when it was realized she had missed the passage and had reefs under her lee. For a time the anchors held, and presumably this is when her distress signals were heard. Then her windlass was torn from her deck, letting the vessel come downwind onto the reefs where after striking her machinery fell through her bottom and her destruction proceeded.

== Wreck and legal controversy ==
In March 1880 an upturned hull identified as that of the lost ship was found on Moberly Island. A long account of its discovery "in a small bay in eleven feet of water" was given in the Parry Sound Star. A tug was employed to turn over the hull to allow investigators to determine why the ship sank. Following the ship's disappearance there had been rumours that her wooden superstructure was rotten, or that her boilers had blown up.

A report from April 1, 1880 described the discovered wreck as located "in a direct line between the 'Indian Docks' and the 'Haystacks' about two miles north of the latter.... As she lies now she shows no signs of having come in contact with the rocks, but the starboard side, from the stern to within about twenty-five or thirty feet of her bow, is burst outwardly, though not completely detached, while on her port side not the slightest sign of any injury is visible." Another report noted that "The whole of the starboard bottom is completely destroyed. The port side and keel as far as can be seen have not a scratch. The engines and boiler can not be in her as the hull has floated at least four miles from where the wreckage was picked up last fall."

Several expeditions followed. An expedition set out from Midland, returning Monday 9 June. They brought back with them pieces of cordwood "covered with blood, and the leader of the expedition concludes from that fact that the boiler of the Waubuno had burst". Later in June another expedition set out and "inspected the wreck and from every appearance of the hull, the impression formed on a former occasion was strengthened namely that the boiler of the steamer had blown up. The conclusion arrived at from a close inspection of the boat is that the boiler was blown through and out the stern as is quite apparent from the shattered appearance."

When news of the wreck reached Thomas Long, the president of the Georgian Bay Transportation Company (owner of the Waubuno), he disputed the findings and visited the wreck himself in July. A summary of the expedition stated that the ship was now "further in deep water" but attributed this movement to earlier expeditions. It claimed that there were no "indications of her having blown up", and although "the whole deck was completely gone, and some portions of the side being worn away", they emphasized that parts of the boat had "an exceedingly fresh appearance — almost as much so as the day she was launched".

Citizens called for a government enquiry, but this was thwarted. One opponent was the local Collingwood Messenger newspaper, reported to be "frighting to prevent an enquiry". The Northern Advance journal complained that "the Messenger man has never yet visited the scene of the wreck and examined the hull while we have done so six or eight different times." Some tried for civil suits but the Georgian Bay Transportation Company succeeded in obtaining an injunction against proceedings. When the same company's ship Simcoe was lost in November 1880 and similar safety concerns were raised, a local newspaper reported that "Collingwood is getting an unenviable notoriety for sending to sea marine hearses.... The owners in both cases are the same.... The Waubuno was not seaworthy, and there is reason to believe that the owners were aware of the fact, yet, for greed of gain, she was sent to sea.... Competent judges assert that the Simcoe was equally unsafe...." Legal cases regarding the Waubuno's owners continued in vain in the 1880s.

Other parts of the ship have been recovered over the years. A hull which is thought to be that of Waubuno can be found in waters 15 ft (4.5 metres) deep at 45°07′15″N 80°09′58″W, near Wreck Island. though the identification is disputed. Its rudder can be found on display at Midland Ontario's Huronia Museum. There is a wreck closer to Wreck Island at 45°08'30.7"N 80°05'54.5"W. Its anchor was recovered in 1959 and is currently on display at Waubuno Beach, Parry Sound.

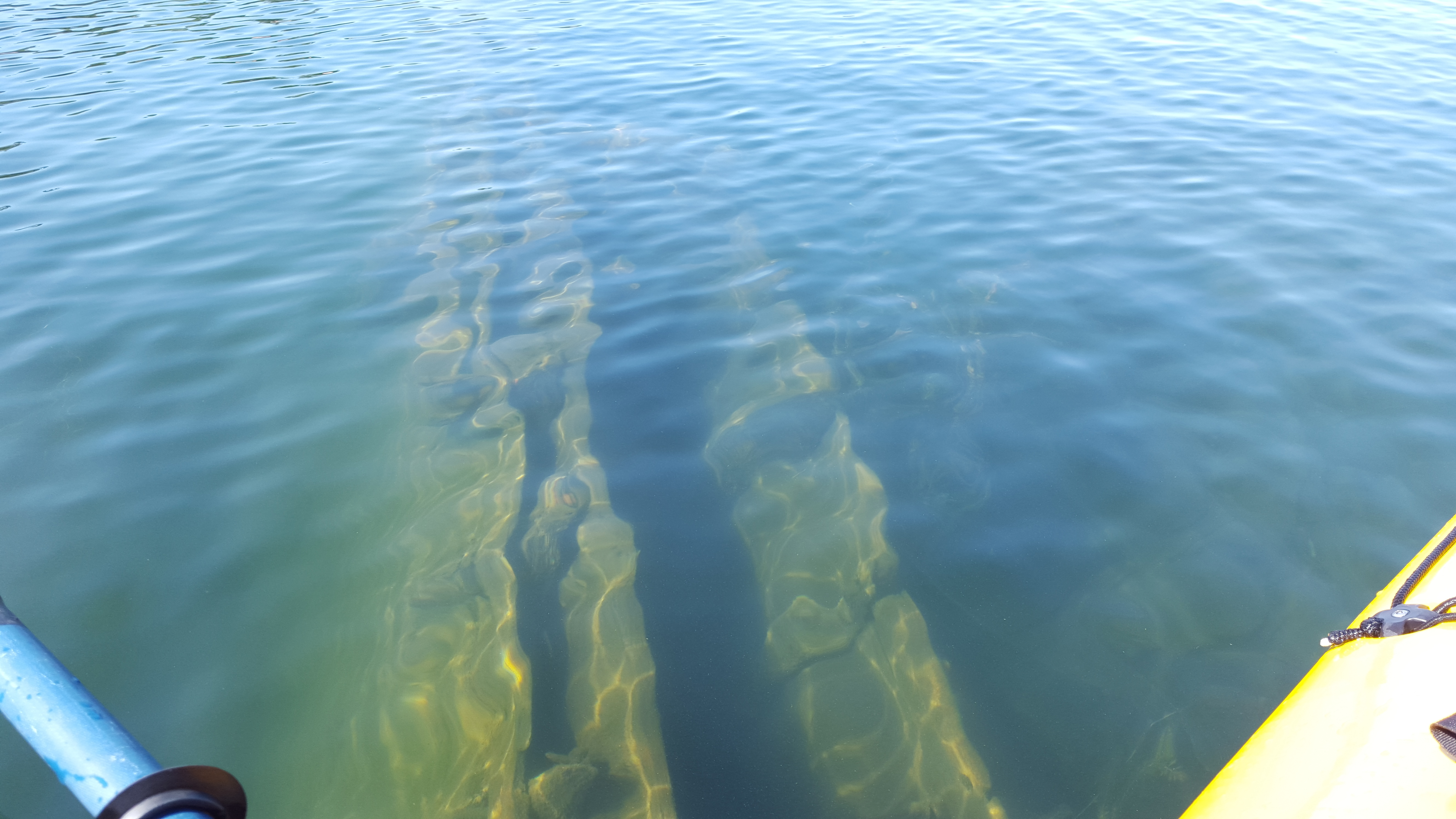
Floating over the wreck of the Waubuno in 2017

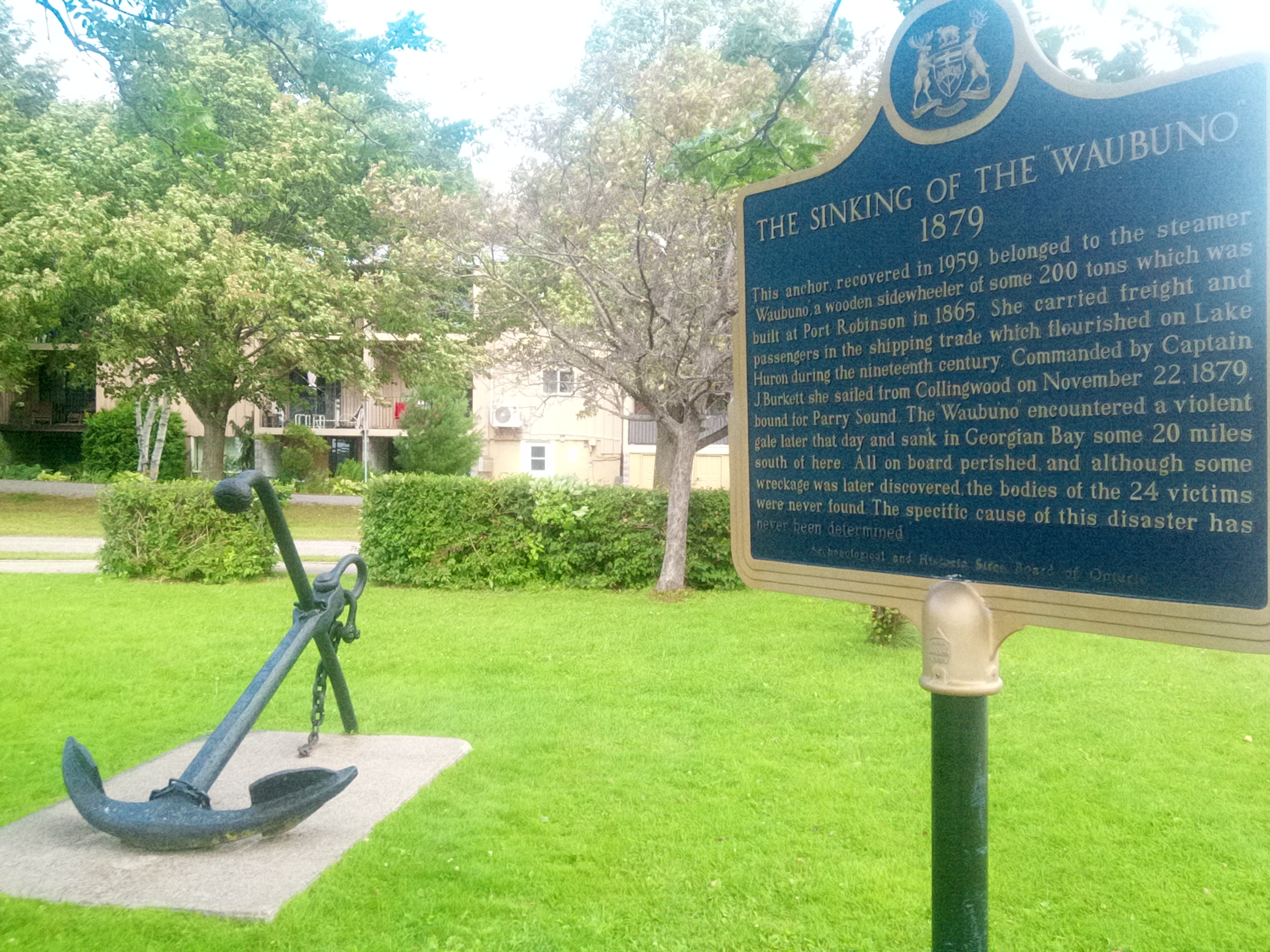
Waubuno anchor and plaque in Parry Sound, Ontario.
