= SS Noronic =

Canadian passenger steamship; destroyed by fire in Toronto Harbour (1949)

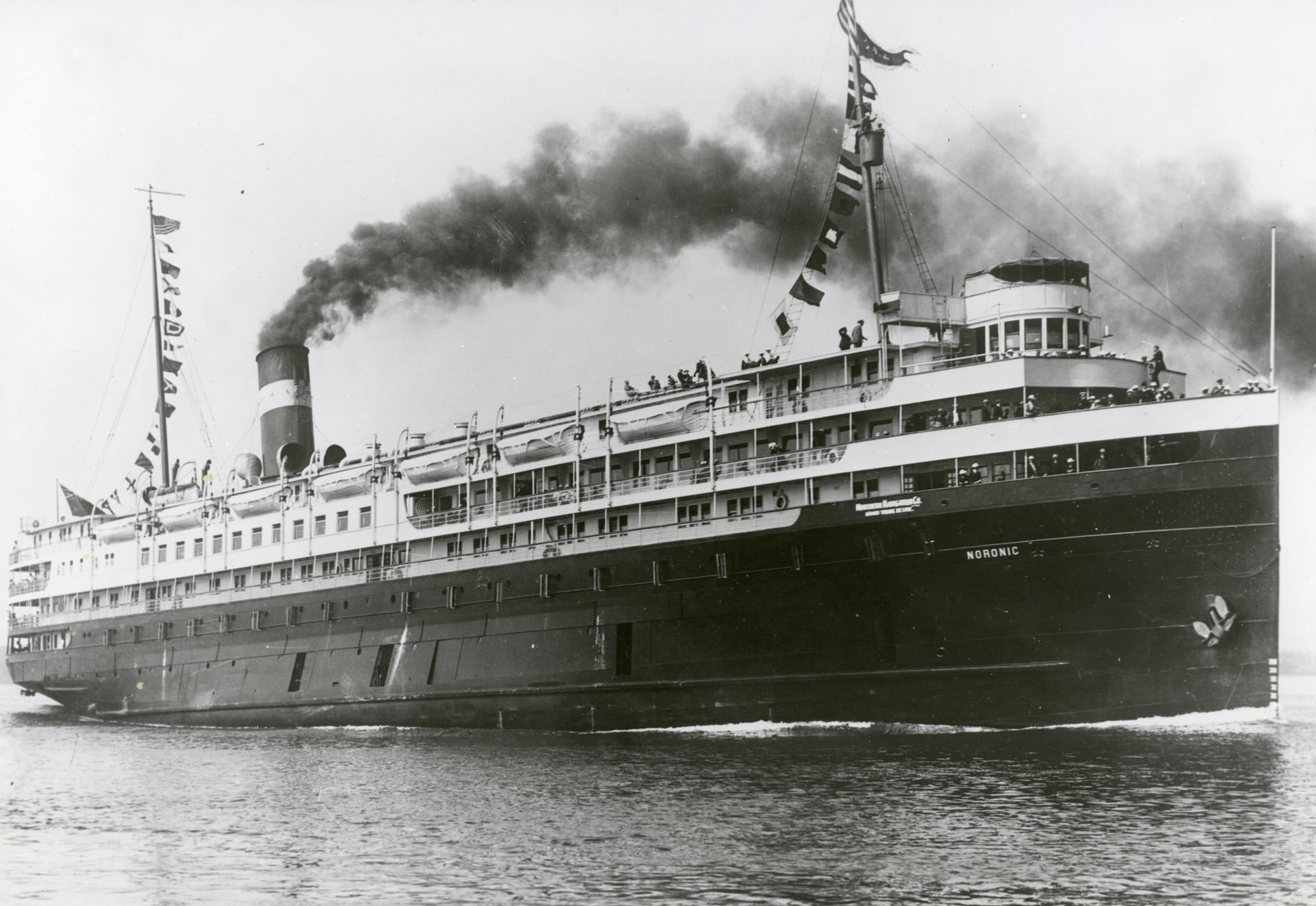
- SS Noronic in Prescott, Ontario 1939.

History

Canada
- Name: SS Noronic
- Owner: Canada Steamship Lines
- Builder: Western Dry Dock and Shipbuilding Co., Port Arthur
- Launched: June 2, 1913
- Nickname(s): "The Queen of the Lakes"
- Fate: Destroyed by fire, September 17, 1949

General characteristics
- Type: Passenger ship
- Tonnage: 6,095 GRT
- Length: 362 ft (110 m)
- Depth: 28 ft 9 in (8.76 m)
- Decks: 5
- Propulsion: 1 × 3-cylinder triple expansion engine, single shaft, 1 screw.
- Speed: 16 knots (30 km/h; 18 mph)
- Capacity: 600 passengers
- Crew: 200

SS Noronic was a Canadian passenger ship that was destroyed by fire in Toronto Harbour in September 1949 with the loss of at least 118 lives.

== Construction ==
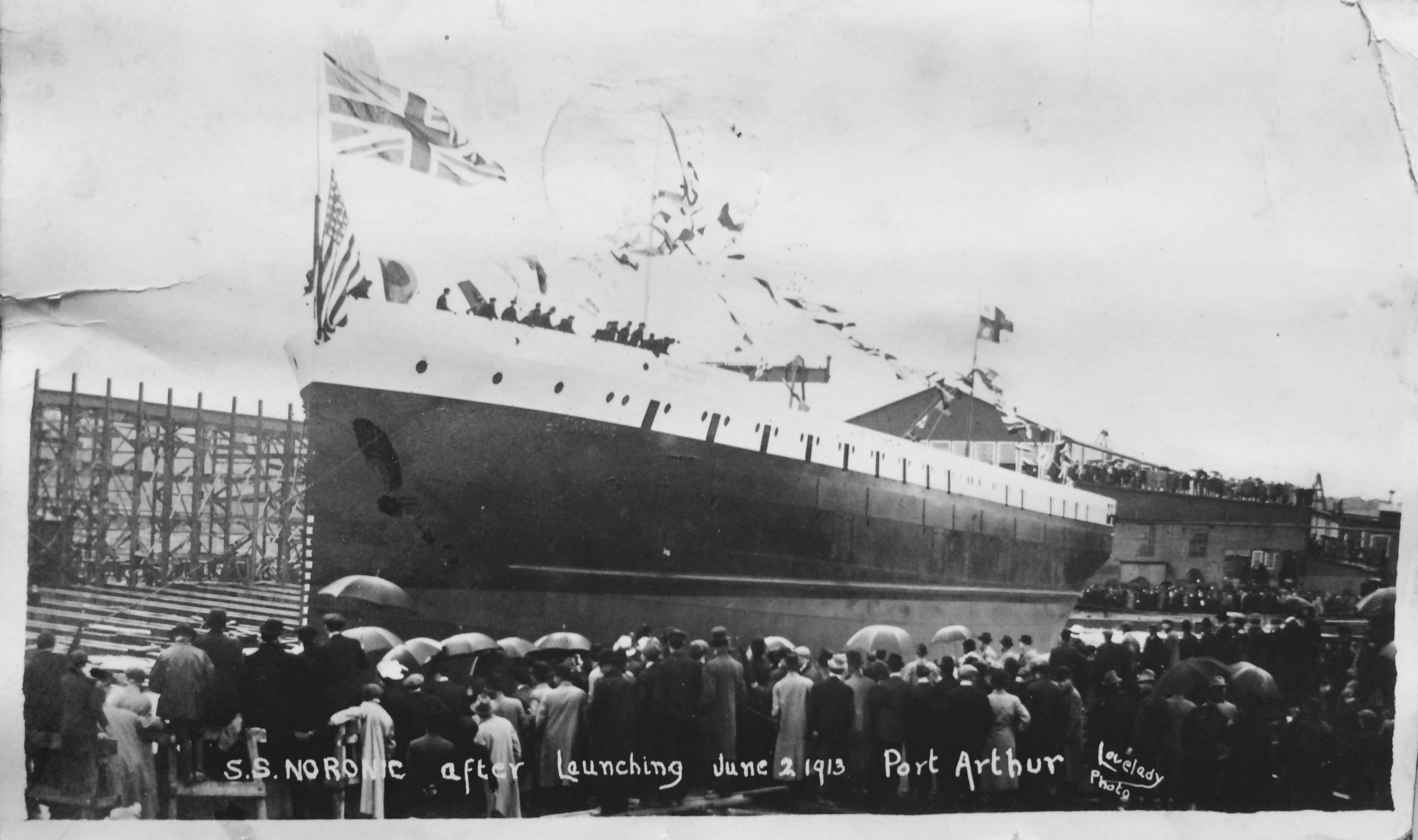
SS Noronic after launching on June 2, 1913 in Port Arthur, Ontario

In 1910 the Northern Navigation Company, a subsidiary of the Richelieu and Ontario Navigation Company, engaged in an operating agreement with the Grand Trunk Railway (GTR), for the construction of a new ship. While Northern did not immediately propose to build a new steamer at that time, the addition of new cabins for the Huronic was also under consideration.

Dining room on the SS Noronic

In mid-January 1911, shipping entrepreneur James Playfair made a bid to purchase the Northern on behalf of himself and his associates. The offer was subject to approval by the GTR, concerning the previous operating agreement. Playfair's offer was to purchase the company at C$1,250,000 for the C$1,000,000 worth of stock and other terms. Northern's president, W. J. Sheppard, communicated the offer to GTR president Charles Melville Hays, who in turn discussed the matter with his company's passenger and freight departments. Hays asked Sheppard if he would consider whether or not the business outlook would warrant the company to place an order for a steamship of equal capacity and general style to Hamonic, to run in the line with that vessel.

Hays did not approve of the proposed transfer of ownership and the deal with Playfair fell through. However, Playfair then went to work to change his mind and managed to secure the GTR's approval. On February 6, Hays notified that, under the agreement with the two companies, Northern would provide a new steamship within eighteen months. The new vessel would be ready no later than the opening of navigation in 1913, and would probably be 400 feet long. Hays' untimely death aboard the Titanic likely contributed to a delay to the start of construction.

== Description ==
SS Noronic travelling through the Sault Ste. Marie canal, circa 1948

SS Noronic was launched June 2, 1913, in Port Arthur, Ontario. She was built by the Western Dry Dock and Shipbuilding Company for Canada Steamship Lines.

Built for passenger and package freight service on the Great Lakes, Noronic had five decks, was 362 feet (110 m) in length, and measured 6,095 gross register tons. At maximum capacity, she could hold 600 passengers and 200 crew. One of Canada's largest and most beautiful passenger ships at the time, she was nicknamed the “Queen of the Lakes."

Passenger decks were labelled A, B, C, and D, and none had direct gangplank access to the dock. The only exits were located on the lowest deck, E deck. There were two gangplanks on the port side and two on the starboard side, and only two were operational at a time.

Noronic had eight fleetmate ships: City of Midland, Doric, Germanic, Ionic, Majestic, Waubic, Huronic and Hamonic. Hamonic burned in 1945 and Huronic was retired and scrapped in 1950.

== Fire ==
On September 14, 1949, Noronic embarked on a seven-day pleasure cruise of Lake Ontario from Detroit, Michigan, United States. She departed from Detroit and picked up additional passengers at Cleveland, Ohio, from where she was scheduled to travel to Prescott, Ontario, and the Thousand Islands before returning to Sarnia, where she would have remained over the winter. Noronic was carrying 524 passengers, all but twenty of whom were American, and 171 crew members, all Canadian. The captain on the voyage was Capt. William Taylor. Noronic docked for the night at Pier 9 in Toronto Harbour at 7:00 p.m. on September 16.

At 2:30 a.m., passenger Don Church noticed smoke in the aft part of the starboard corridor on C deck. Church followed the smell of smoke to a small room off the port corridor, just forward of a women's washroom. Finding that the smoke was coming from a locked linen closet, he notified bellboy Earnest O'Neil of the fire. Without sounding the alarm, O'Neil ran to the steward’s office on D deck to retrieve the keys to the closet. Once the closet was opened, the fire exploded into the hallway; it spread quickly, fueled by the lemon-oil-polished wood paneling on the walls.

Church, O'Neil, another bellboy, and another passenger attempted to fight the blaze with fire extinguishers, but were forced to retreat almost immediately by the spreading flames. To his dismay, O'Neil found the fire extinguishers to be out of order. Church rushed to his stateroom on D deck, and fled the ship with his wife and children. Meanwhile, O'Neil ran to the officers' quarters and notified Captain Taylor. First Mate Gerry Wood then sounded the ship's whistle to raise the alarm. It was 2:38 a.m., only eight minutes after the fire began, but already half of the ship's decks were ablaze.

Twenty-seven-year-old Donald Williamson was the first rescuer on the scene. After working a late shift at a nearby Goodyear Tire plant, the former lake freighter deckhand wanted to see Noronic, which he knew was in port. Williamson arrived to the sound of the ship's distress whistle, as the fire was quickly growing and people were frantically jumping into the lake. Spotting a large painters’ raft nearby, he released it and pushed it into a position near the ship's port bow. As people leapt from the burning ship, he pulled them from the water to the safety of the raft.

Responding to a "routine" box call, Toronto police constables Ronald Anderson and Warren Shaddock turned their "accident" car onto Queen's Quay in time to see the ship erupt in flames as high as the mast. Their cruiser was immediately surrounded by survivors, many in shock, some on fire. A passenger alerted Anderson to those in the water and those on the decks, some in flames. Anderson stripped his uniform off, jumped into the frigid, oily water, and began to assist Williamson on the raft. Fireboats joined the rescue operation, plucking others who jumped into the water from the ship. Among those officers was Jack Marks, who went on to become Toronto's chief of police.

Crew members had to smash portholes to drag some passengers out of their cabins. Moments before the whistle sounded, the pier's night watchman noticed the flames coming from the ship and contacted the Toronto Fire Department. A pumper truck, a hose wagon, a high-pressure truck, an aerial truck, a rescue squad, the deputy chief and a fireboat were dispatched to the scene. Ambulances and police were also dispatched. The first fire truck arrived at the pier at 2:41 a.m.

Passengers escape by rope

By this time, the entire ship was consumed in flames. Only fifteen crew members had been on the ship when the fire broke out, and they failed to make a sweep of the upper four decks to wake passengers; those who did wake up were awakened by screaming and running in the corridors. Most of the ship's stairwells were on fire, and few passengers were able to reach E-deck to escape down the gangplanks. Some passengers climbed down ropes to the pier. The scene was later described as one of great panic, with people jumping from the upper decks engulfed in flames and some falling to their deaths onto the pier below. Others were trampled to death in the mad rush in the corridors. Still others suffocated or were burned alive, unable to exit their cabins. The screams of the dying were said to be audible even over the sounds of whistles and sirens.

The first rescue ladder was extended to B deck. It was immediately rushed by passengers, causing the ladder to snap in two. The passengers were sent tumbling into the harbour, where they were rescued by a waiting fireboat. Other ladders extended to C deck held firm throughout the rescue.

After about twenty minutes, the metal hull was white hot, and the decks began to buckle and collapse onto each other. After an hour of fighting the blaze, Noronic was so full of water from fire hoses that it listed severely toward the pier, causing firefighters to retreat. The ship then righted itself, and firefighters returned to their original positions. By the end, more than 1.7 million gallons (6.4 million litres) of water had been poured on the ship from 37 hoses.

The fire was extinguished by 5:00 a.m., and the wreckage was allowed to cool for two hours before the recovery of bodies began. Searchers found a gruesome scene inside the burned-out hull. Firefighters reported finding charred, embracing skeletons in the corridors. Some deceased passengers were found still in their beds. Many skeletons were almost completely incinerated, resulting in forensic dentistry being reportedly used to identify remains for the first time. Glass had melted from every window, and even steel fittings had warped and twisted from the heat. Every stairwell had been completely destroyed, save for one near the bow.

== Aftermath ==
The burned-out hull of Noronic

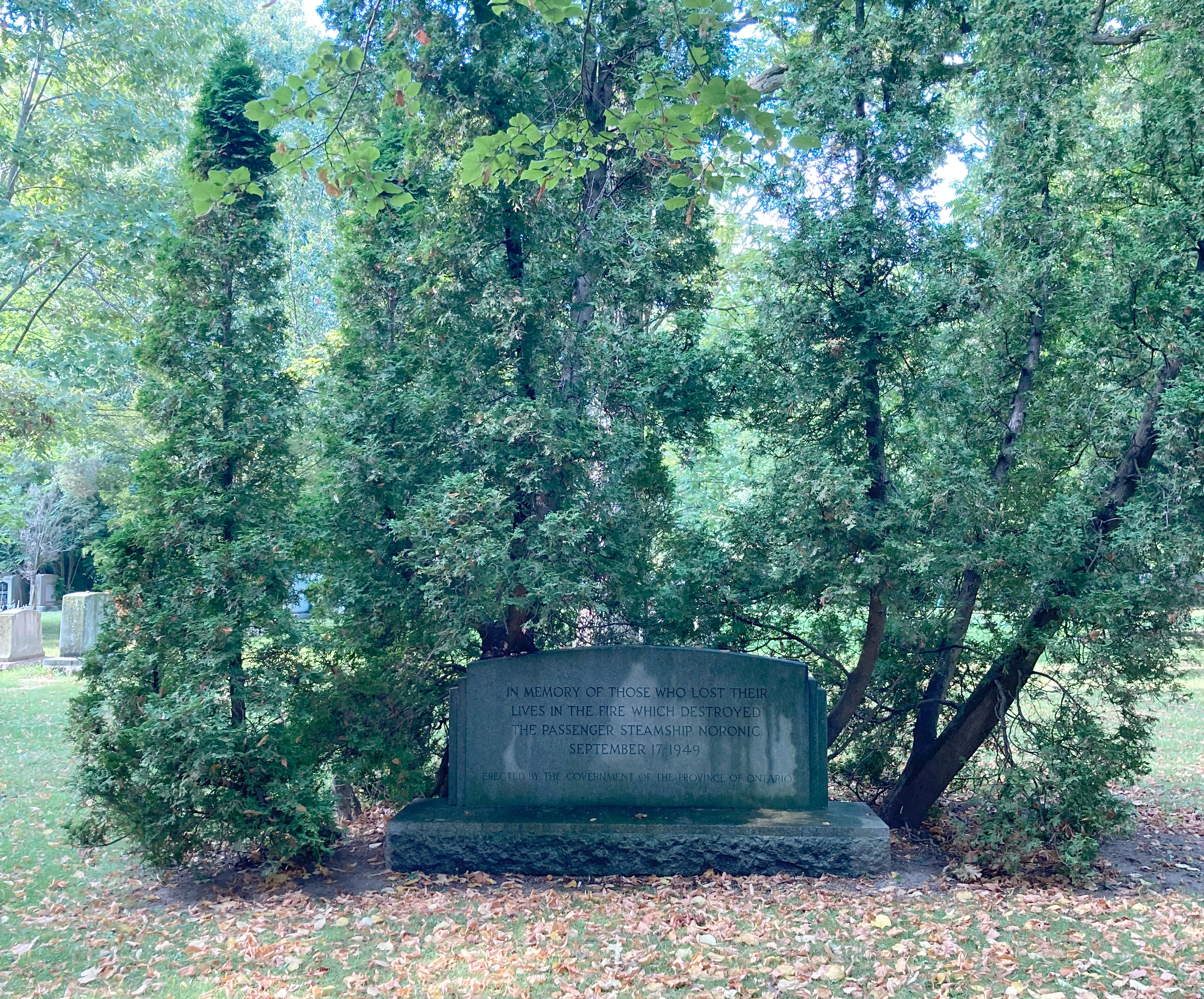
Memorial at Mount Pleasant Cemetery, Toronto

The death toll from the disaster was never precisely determined. Estimates range anywhere from 118 to 139 deaths. Most died from either suffocation or burns. Some died from being trampled or from leaping off the upper decks onto the pier. Only one person drowned. To the anger of many, all 118 of those initially killed were passengers. (One crewmember, Louisa Dustin, later died of her injuries; she was the only Canadian victim, and the 119th fatality.)

An inquiry was formed by the House of Commons to investigate the accident. The fire was determined to have started in the linen closet on C deck, but the cause was never discovered. It was deemed likely that a cigarette was carelessly dropped by a member of the laundry staff. Company officials suspected arson.

The high death toll was blamed largely on the ineptitude and cowardice of the crew, too few of whom were on duty at the time the fire began and none of whom attempted to wake the passengers. Also, many crew members fled the ship at the first alarm, and no member of the crew ever called the fire department. Passengers had never been informed of evacuation routes or procedures. The design and construction of the 36-year-old ship were also found to be at fault; the interiors had been lined with oiled wood instead of fireproof material, exits were only located on one deck instead of all five, and none of the ship's fire extinguishers were in working order.

Captain Taylor was hailed as a hero in the weeks after the fire. During the fire, he broke windows, pulling trapped passengers from their rooms, and was among the last of the crew to leave the vessel. However, the Canadian Department of Transport inquiry into the disaster blamed both Taylor and Canada Steamship Lines for failing to take adequate precautions against fire, and ordered Taylor's master's certificate suspended for one year. A witness made an accusation that Taylor had been under the influence of alcohol during the fire; Taylor denied this, and other witnesses testified that he was behaving normally.

Noronic, which settled to the bottom in shallow water, was partially taken apart at the scene. The upper decks were cut away, and the hull was re-floated on November 29, 1949. It was towed to Hamilton, Ontario, where it was scrapped. Her sister ship, the smaller Huronic, was retired and scrapped in 1950. By 1967, Canada Steamship Lines phased out its remaining passenger ships from the fleet due to new international regulations relating to ships containing wood and other flammable materials. Civil lawsuits for Noronic were settled for just over C$2 million.

Noronic's whistle is displayed in a nautical museum on Toronto's Waterfront. The Ontario Heritage Foundation placed a plaque near the site of the disaster on its 50th anniversary.

The hull of Charles A. Reed, Toronto's wooden-hulled fireboat, was damaged by the fire's extreme heat, triggering city council to seek to replace her with a more powerful, modern, steel-hulled vessel.
