= James Playfair (businessman) =

- Born: 8 July 1860; Toronto, Canada West
- Died: 25 May 1937 (aged 76); Midland, Ontario, Canada
- Occupation: Businessman
- Known for: Great Lakes shipping; Midland businessman
- Spouse: Charlotte Ogilivie

James Playfair (8 July 1860 – 25 May 1937) was noted for his entrepreneurship in the Great Lakes shipping, lumbering, grain handling, and industrial manufacturing businesses. He was a central figure in the establishment of Midland, Ontario, Canada.

== Lumbering ==
At the age of 19, James Playfair was hired by the Toronto Lumber Company which had timber holdings in Simcoe County and mills at Collingwood. In 1883 the creditors of H. H. Cook's British North American Lumber Company hired James Playfair to saw up the stock of unsawed logs at their Midland sawmill. The lumbering firm of James Playfair & Company was started in 1884. Playfair's first mill was located at Sturgeon Bay, (between Waubaushene and Victoria Harbour). In 1894 he formed a lumber partnership with Douglas Leyland White, Jr. and together they purchased the mill formerly known as the Miscampbell mill, at Midland. D. L. White Jr. of Saginaw, Michigan, was the former treasurer of the Emery Lumber Co. of Saginaw and East Tawas, MI. incorporated in 1885. They were involved in the export of logs from the Sudbury region, to supply their Michigan mills. When the export duty on logs was increased in 1886, the vice president of the Emery Lumber Co. R. A. Loveland arranged to have that firm's Georgian Bay logs manufactured into lumber at Miscampbell's mill. By the 1890s Andrew Miscampbell desired to devote more of his time to politics. He sold his mill to the Emery Lumber Co. in 1891, but with the reduction of the duty on logs exported to the United States, operations of the Midland mill were abandoned and Emery's lumber production was resumed on the American side. D. L. White Jr. continued his involvement with the Saginaw Lumber And Salt Company (incorporated in 1881), with the same officers as the Emery Lumber Co. With their acquisition of the former Emery Lumber Co. mill, James Playfair and D. L. White formed the Playfair-White Company. They contracted to supply the lumber requirements of Saginaw lumberman Arthur Hill, with logs from timber limits the French and Spanish rivers. The mill operated at full capacity until 1916, when the Midland Shipbuilding Company was established on the same site.

== Shipping interests ==
In 1895, Playfair purchased from Burton Bros., of Collingwood, the tug Metamora, three barges and a large quantity of boom logs, which he planned to use in connection with the lumbering business. In partnership with John Waldie and Capt. W. H. Featherstonhaugh, Playfair purchased an 11 year old steamer, the W. B. Hall in 1896. The ship was lengthened at the Polson Shipyard at Owen Sound, renamed St. Andrew, and placed in the grain trade between Fort William and Goderich. Metamora and St. Andrew were operated by Playfair's Barge And Tug Line. St. Andrew served Playfair for five seasons but, on September 20, 1900, she stranded on an island on Lake Superior and became a total loss. Metamora, along with ships Magnolia, Reliance and Traveler became part of the Midland Towing And Wrecking Co. Ltd. Metamora struck a shoal at Shawanaga Bay, near Parry Sound in 1907. It subsequently caught fire and was completely destroyed.

Playfair incorporated the Midland Navigation Company, in 1901. The steel bulk carrier Midland Queen was built in 1901 at Dundee, Scotland. A second vessel, Midland King, was a steel bulk carrier built 1903 by Collingwood Shipbuilding, and steel bulk carrier Midland Prince was built 1906–07 by Collingwood. Empress of Midland built in 1907 and Empress of Fort William built 1908 were steel bulk carriers, both built at Wallsend-on-Tyne by Swan Hunter & Wigham Richardson. The latter two vessels were built for the Midland Navigation Co., but soon became part of the Empress Navigation Co. of Midland.

In March, 1910, Playfair and Company gained control of the Inland Navigation Company Ltd. from the Mackay brothers, of Hamilton. A plan was devised to merge the company with the Midland Navigation Co. and the Empress Navigation Co. The ships of the Hamilton firm were Neepawah, Wahcondah, Rosedale, Glenellah, Dundee, Dunelm, Wincona, Strathcona, Donnacona, Dundurn, and Stadacona. The new company was incorporated as Inland Lines Ltd.

In mid-January 1911, James Playfair made a bid to purchase the Northern Navigation Co. on behalf of himself and his associates. The offer to purchase the company was subject to approval by the Grand Trunk Railway, concerning a previous arrangement that its president C. M. Hays had made with the company for the construction of a new steamship of the Hamonic type. The conditions were met and Playfair became the new president of Northern Navigation Co. While a merger between the Northern Navigation Co. and Inland Lines Ltd. had been discussed, it was thought that a holding company to control them, was more probable. At that time, there was talk of an even larger merger between the Northern Navigation Co. and the Richelieu And Ontario Navigation Co. In 1911 the Richelieu And Ontario Navigation Co. were allowed to increase their capital stock. At a special meeting of shareholders held on June 26, it was decided to increase the stock from $5,000,0000 to $10,000,000, with the distribution of new shares to be issued by the directors. The shares of the Northern Navigation Co. Ltd. and of the Inland Lines Ltd. were purchased and paid for with fully paid up stock of the R. And O Navigation Co. Five additional directors were added to the reorganized Richelieu And Ontario Navigation Co. James Playfair became the vice president and managing director.

On June 2, 1913, Playfair was on his way to Port Arthur, for the launching of the SS Noronic. He was a passenger on the steamship Hamonic on Lake Superior, when the Wireless operator received word that his father had died in Toronto aged 87. Playfair transferred to one of the R And O Nav. Co. freighters mid-lake, about 80 miles from Sault Ste. Marie and made his way to Toronto by special train.

A special meeting of the shareholders of Richelieu And Ontario Navigation Co. was held in the company's office in Montreal, on June 19, 1913, to ratify an agreement of sale of the company's assets to a new company formed for that purpose. The new company was to be called Canada Transportation Lines Limited. In the early part of December it was announced that Canada Transportation Lines would be renamed Canada Steamship Lines Limited. All the ships of Inland Lines Ltd. were taken over by the R And O Navigation Co. and absorbed into Canada Steamship Lines in 1913.

With the acquisition of Inland Lines Ltd. Playfair relinquished personal control of his ships, although he was still a director of the company. He retired as managing director early in 1914.

Playfair was presented with a solid silver center table piece and rose bowl with the following inscription: "Presented to James Playfair by the officials, staff, captains and engineers of the Inland Lines, Ltd., and Northern Navigation Co., Ltd., as a token of the high esteem in which he is held by one and all." An old English chime clock was also presented to Mrs. Playfair.

== Later shipping companies ==
In 1914, Playfair his partners incorporated the Great Lakes Transportation Company Ltd., to carry on a general navigation business. Two of the first ships were Glenmavis and Glenfoyle, reported to have been built for Playfair in Derry, Ireland. Both were owned by James Richardson and Sons, of Kingston, Ontario, and later operated by Great Lakes Transportation Co. along with the Calgary, built at Newcastle upon Tyne in 1912. Playfair soon began to rebuild his own fleet of steamships – from the Pittsburgh Steamship Company he purchased the Wawatam, renamed Glenlivet and from the Chicago and Duluth Transportation Company came Minnekahta and Minnetonka, renamed Glenlyon and Glenfinnan respectively. The motor vessel Toiler was also acquired, but soon resold.

The Glen Transportation Co. Ltd., incorporated in 1920, owned and operated canal-sized ships on the Great Lakes, St. Lawrence River, and coastal waters. The company bought Glencadam and Glenclova, formerly operated by the Great Lakes Transportation Company, and the 259 foot Glenafton, built at the Port Arthur Shipbuilding Company in 1921.

In 1922 Playfair and his associates bought six ships from the French government. All had been built by American shipbuilders in 1903 and were originally owned by the Great Lakes And St. Lawrence Transportation Co. of Chicago. The ships had been requisitioned for service overseas during World War I. George C. Howe and John Crera, built at Chicago, became the Glenealy and Glenarnoch. H. G. Dalton, built at Superior, Wisconsin, became the Glendochart. J. S. Keefe and Robert Wallace, built at Buffalo, became Glenfarn and Glendowan, and S. N. Parent, built in Detroit, became Glenarm.

In 1926, the 633 foot Glenmohr, launched at Midland, was the largest bulk carrier on the Great Lakes.

== Other business interests ==
Playfair was involved in numerous other activities, among them:

- Midland Towing And Wrecking Co. Ltd.
- Canadian Dredge And Construction Co. incorporated in 1906
- Toronto Elevators

== Personal life ==
Playfair was the son of John Speirs Playfair (26 June 1826, Glasgow – 2 June 1913, Toronto) and Georgina Hall of Montreal. John Playfair came to Canada as an employee of dry goods merchant John McMurrich. For some time John Playfair had managed the firm's Kingston store and may have been involved with shipping on Lake Ontario. He first became involved with Alexander Peter Cockburn's Muskoka Lakes Navigation Co. in 1879 and served as president of that line for more than 25 years.

In 1889 James Playfair married Sarah Charlotte Ogilvie (1858–1945), youngest daughter of Senator Alexander Walker Ogilvie of Montreal, former president of Ogilvie Flour Mills.

The Georgian Bay Cup was won in 1888 by James Playfair as a prize for the inaugural Georgian Bay Cup Regatta. The Playfairs also saved Little Lake Park from being cut down in 1906. James Playfair purchased a residence and donated it to the Town of Midland for St Andrews Hospital, a predecessor of today's Georgian Bay General Hospital. On October 25, 1918, Mr. and Mrs. Playfair celebrated their 29th wedding anniversary, with the launching of the War Fiend, the first steel cargo ship built at Midland Shipyards. James Playfair was the vice president and general manager of the Midland Shipbuilding Co. President of Midland Golf And Country Club The site of Presbyterian church camp Glen Mohr near Beaverton was donated by the Playfairs in 1930. The Playfairs donated their residence, Edgehill, overlooking Midland Harbour on Georgian Bay. The residence was the first home of the Huronia museum. Today it is the site of Edgehill Park (formerly known as Huronia Park).

A mural in Midland commemorates Playfair.

The first cargo ship of the season to arrive in Midland is presented with Playfair's top hat.
