= William J. Wood =

Canadian painter, etcher (1877-1954)

- Born: William John Wood; May 26, 1877 near Ottawa, Ontario
- Died: January 4, 1954 (aged 76); Midland, Ontario
- Education: Central Ontario School of Art, later known as the Ontario College of Art
- Known for: painter, etcher
- Spouse: Jessie Reaman (m. 1906)

William J. Wood (May 26, 1877 – January 5, 1954) was a Canadian painter and etcher.

Wood was a close friend of several members of the Group of Seven: Arthur Lismer and A.Y. Jackson. In 1923 at one Group of Seven exhibition Wood is listed as a member of the Group of Seven, replacing Franz Johnston. Much of his work depicts scenes in Midland, Ontario, his hometown. The Huronia Museum, in Midland, Ontario, has an extensive collection of his works.

== Career ==
Born near Ottawa, he left his home on a farm on Lake Erie to work on the Great Lakes on its ships. Around 1900 he studied at the Eric Pape School of Art in Boston, Massachusetts, then in 1904-1905, studied at the Central Ontario School of Art and Industrial Design, (later OCAD University) with George Agnew Reid, William Cruikshank, Charles Manly and Robert Holmes.

He worked in 1907 at homesteading in Heaslip, Ontario and as a part-time illustrator at the "Temiskaming Herald". While there, self-taught, he began to etch, inspired by Anders Zorn. He met Frank Carmichael in 1908, Arthur Lismer in 1911, and in 1913, had a solo exhibition at the Arts and Letters Club in Toronto (he became a non-resident member of the Club). He settled in Midland in 1913 to work at the shipyards.

In 1915, he enlisted in the army for three years. While in England, he attended shows of graphic art at the Royal Academy. He returned to Canada in 1919 and began to paint and make etchings again and exhibited his work at the Ontario Society of Artists and Canadian Society of Painter-Etchers and Engravers, even having one work go to the British Empire Exhibition at Wembley, England in 1924. He showed his work as well in Group of Seven shows in 1923 (the catalogue listed him as a member) and 1928.

In the 1930s Depression, he was unemployed at the shipyards and produced his most vigorous etchings and paintings. In 1954, he died in Midland. In 1983 the Art Gallery of Ontario in Toronto created the travelling retrospective titled W. J. Wood (1877-1954) Paintings and Graphics.

He was a member of the Canadian Group of Painters, the Canadian Society of Painter-Etchers and Engravers and the Canadian Society of Graphic Art

The Art Gallery of Ontario E. P. Taylor Research Library and Archives has the "Christine Boyanoski – W.J. Wood Collection CA OTAG SC030".

== Selected public collections ==
- Art Gallery of Hamilton;
- Art Gallery of Ontario, Toronto;
- Justina M. Barnicke Gallery, Art Museum at the University of Toronto;
- Huronia Museum, Midland;
- McMaster Museum of Art, Hamilton;
- McMichael Canadian Art Collection, Kleinburg;
- National Gallery of Canada, Ottawa;
