= John W. Bald =

Canadian photographer

John Witherspoon Bald (born April 7, 1868, Parsonstown, Ireland - died 1961, Midland, Ontario, Canada) was a Canadian photographer who produced portraits, landscape and other commercial photographs. He recorded life in his community from 1890 until 1953 when he retired. Bald worked for both Midland newspapers, the Free Press and the Argus, and also developed an extensive post card business.

Bald first began his photographic business in Penetanguishene, Ontario. In 1896 he purchased a studio in Midland on King Street. His photographic career began shortly after the introduction of gelatine dry plate photography. This type of plate was commercially prepared and could be stored prior to exposure. This was a major improvement over the earlier collodion wet plates, improving the process and freeing photographers to take photographs practically anywhere.

Bald’s work is a complete record of the life, work, and play of small town Ontario. Business, ships, harbour life, industries, social life, hunting, tourism, sports, and portraits are all subjects found in his work.

The Huronia Museum in Midland has an extensive collection of Bald’s photographs, postcards, and equipment.
