= Midland Cultural Centre =

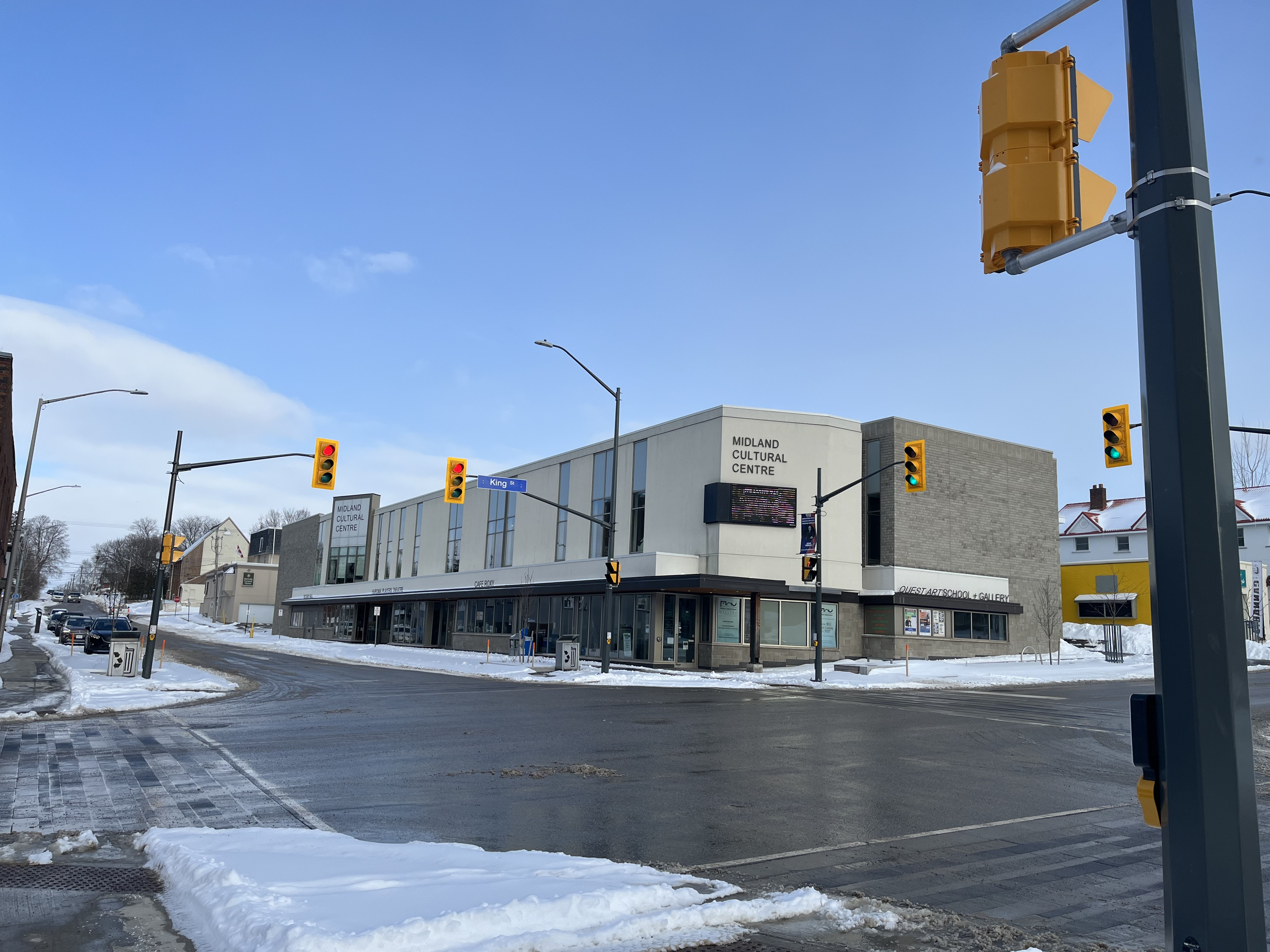

General information
- Location: 333 King Street, Midland, Ontario, Canada
- Coordinates: 44°44′55″N 79°53′00″W
- Completed: 2012
- Client: Reinhart Weber

Technical details
- Floor area: 2787 m^2 (30 000 sq ft)

Design and construction
- Architect: Howard Rideout Architect
- Main contractor: IHD Design Build

The Midland Cultural Centre is a public multi-use complex located in Midland, Ontario, Canada. The 2787 m^{2} (30 000 sq ft) building is home to three main groups: Quest Art School and Gallery, the Huronia Players theatre company, and Rotary Hall, a community event space.

The Midland Cultural Centre was designed by Howard Rideout of Howard Rideout Architect (HRA), in collaboration with IHD Design Build. The project’s client and benefactor, local philanthropist Reinhart Weber, was also involved in the design, ensuring that his plan to create an arts Centre in the heart of downtown Midland would come to fruition. Reinhart Weber donated the funds needed for the $7.5 million project.

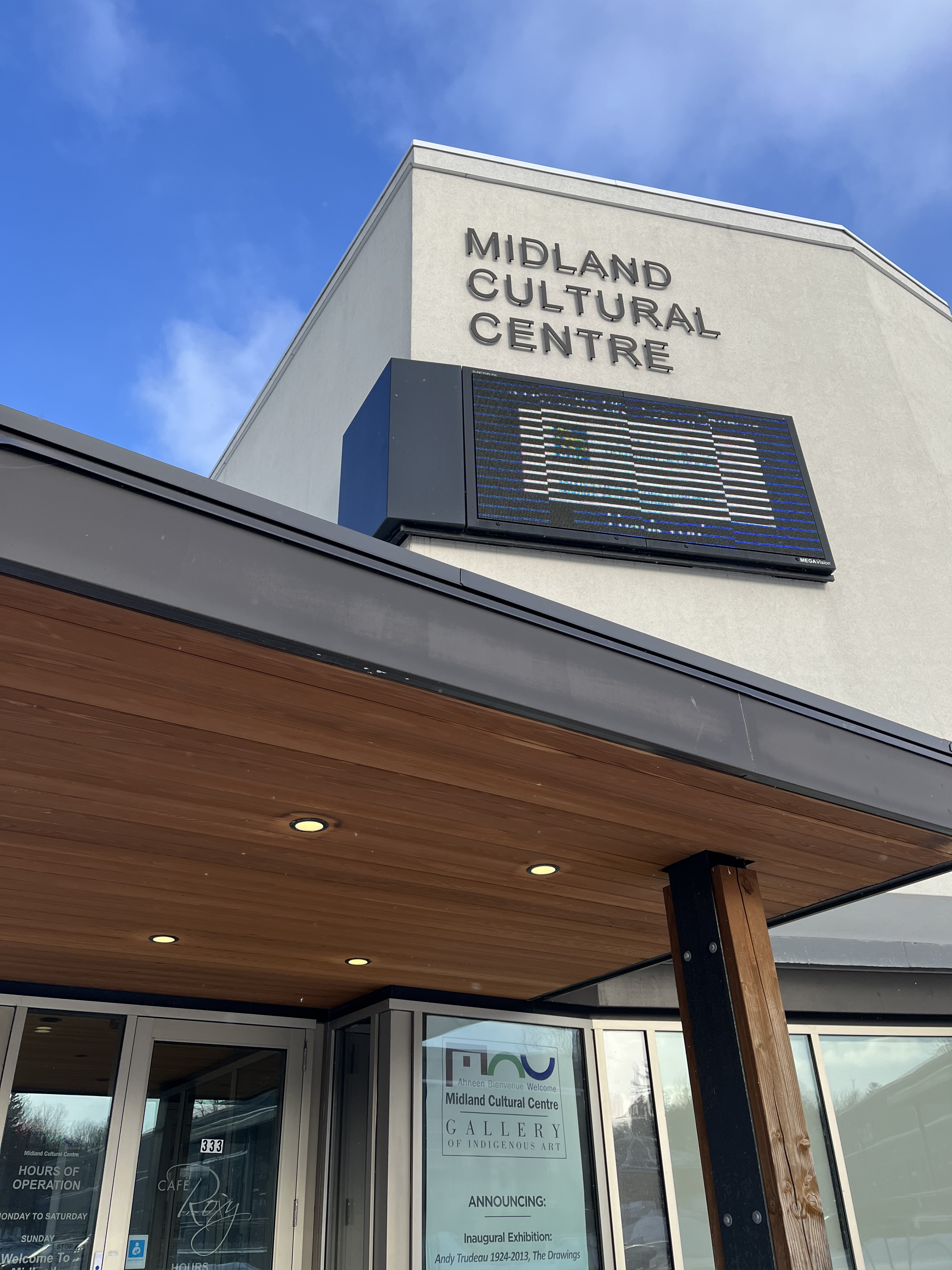
The King Street entrance of the Midland Cultural Centre

== History ==
The site of the Midland Cultural Centre used to be home to the Roxy Theatre, which opened in 1949. After closing in 2000, the theatre was demolished in 2010 when Reinhart Weber purchased the property.

== Commission ==
In August 2001, HRA was a corporate sponsor of the Battle of Georgian Bay, a re-enactment event that took place along the shoreline of Penetanguishene’s Discovery Harbour. From this event, Howard Rideout was able to make connections which eventually led to the design of Reinhart Weber’s house.

When Reinhart Weber showed interest in building a community centre in Midland, he approached HRA to lead the project. The original plan was to renovate the abandoned Regent Public School, on the East side of Midland in a dense residential area. The site would become the Huronia Centre for the Arts. The plan to build a centre this large was not received well by the community, and the site would be difficult to find for those not native to Midland, as it was not in a central location.

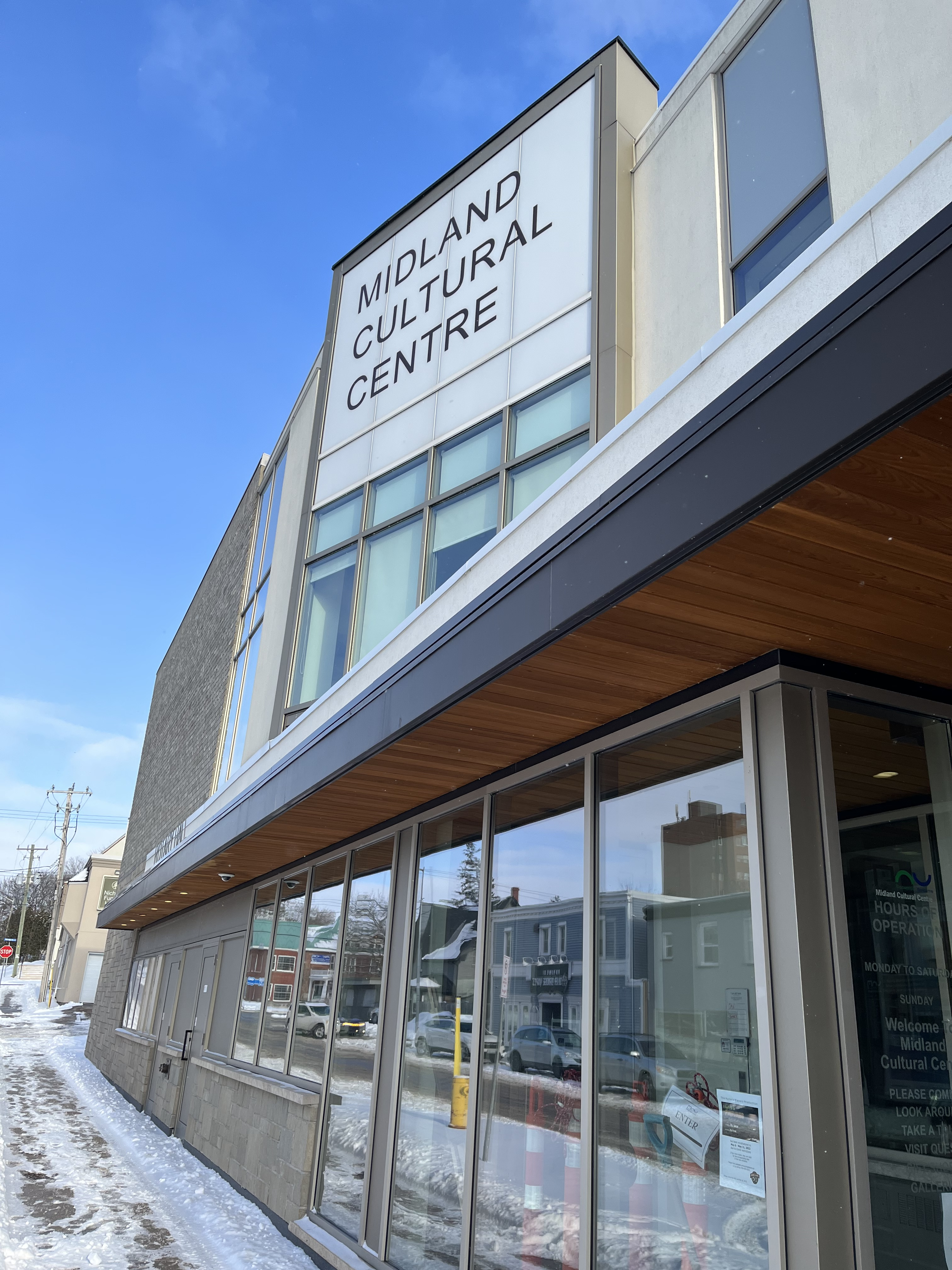
Marquee above the Elizabeth Street entrance of the Midland Cultural Centre

=== Design ===
When the centre was confirmed to be built on the corner of King Street and Elizabeth Street, HRA's objective was to design a building that would revitalize the downtown, while staying true to the architectural typology along the main street. The Midland Cultural Centre was designed to pull visitors back into the side street of Elizabeth, redefining the spaces as a safe, positive pedestrian experience. A marquee is placed along Elizabeth Street, angled toward King Street, further drawing people perpendicular to the main street. The marquee also pays homage to the former Roxy Theatre.

The ground-level façade of the building consists of large panels of curtain-glass, making the activity inside the building visible to those outside. Above the curtain glass, a wooden canopy runs along the exterior of the building that continues into the lobby of the centre, seamlessly transitioning from exterior to interior.

== Programs ==
=== Huronia Players ===
The Huronia Players is a community theatre company based in Midland. The theatre puts on three productions per year, and host workshops for theatre arts.

The Huronia Players found a permanent home in the Midland Cultural Centre after reaching out to Reinhart Weber in 2007.

=== MCC Gallery of Indigenous Art ===
The MCC operates a ground floor gallery presenting Indigenous Art. With programming and oversight by an Indigenous member majority committee, the MCC will operate the gallery focusing on work by artists and artisans of the Beausoleil First Nation and members of the Georgian Bay Métis community. The inclusive space will also show works by the broader community of Canadian Indigenous artists and artisans.

=== Quest Art School and Gallery ===
Quest Art School and Gallery host exhibitions, classes, and workshops for the community. The Gallery’s gift shop and art store was designed to take up the King Street façade, with a large window looking in that creates the feeling of a storefront window, a feature that is consistent in almost all buildings in the downtown, more specifically along King Street.

=== Rotary Hall ===
Midland was lacking a venue whose sole purpose was hosting events, which led to the integration of Rotary Hall. Rotary Hall is most commonly used as a music venue, but the hall also hosts a myriad of events that bring the town’s residents together, whether it be as a wedding/party venue, for cultural gatherings, hobby clubs, fundraisers, seminars or seniors’ events.

== Events ==
=== A Day in the Life ===
A Day in the Life is an event series that takes place at the Midland Cultural Centre. Attendees sit in on a conversation with notable Canadians.

Notable guests include former Prime Minister Brian Mulroney, Toronto Mayor John Tory, Dream Theater vocalist James LaBrie, and local band Born Ruffians.

=== Ontario's Best Butter Tart Festival ===
Starting in 2013, Midland hosts an annual Butter Tart Festival along King Street, and along the waterfront. The festival includes various vendors throughout the downtown, and a butter tart contest, open to both professional and home bakers.

The festival recorded 65 000 visitors in 2019, its sixth year of running. In its first year, 10 000 butter tarts were sold by 11:00 am.

The Midland Cultural Centre serves as the physical representation of the festival, providing public washrooms to the crowds of people, and hosting the butter tart contest, which takes place in Rotary Hall.
