= John Inglis and Company =

Canadian appliance manufacturer

- Industry: Manufacturing
- Founded: 27 July 1859 (as Mair, Inglis and Evatt); 1937 (as John Inglis and Company)
- Fate: Acquired by Whirlpool in 1987, then changed its name in 2001. Today name retained as a brand of appliances sold in Canada.
- Successor: Whirlpool Canada
- Headquarters: Canada
- Website: www.inglis.ca

John Inglis and Company was a Canadian manufacturing firm which made weapons for the United Kingdom and British Commonwealth military forces during the World War II era, then later became a major appliance manufacturer in the post-war era. Whirlpool Corporation acquired control of Inglis in 1987 and changed the company's name to Whirlpool Canada in 2001. Today the Inglis name survives as a brand under Whirlpool.

== History ==
The company traces its roots to John Inglis who was involved in early enterprises in Dundas and Guelph, Ontario. On 27 July 1859, he, Thomas Mair and Francis Evatt formed Mair, Inglis and Evatt, a machine shop in Guelph, Ontario, that produced machinery for grist and flour mills. In 1864, they added a steam engine to power the machines. Some time after 1864, Daniel Hunter replaced Thomas Mair, and the name of the business was changed to Inglis and Hunter.

In September 1881, Inglis purchased a large triangular plot of land near downtown Toronto, west of Strachan Avenue. He moved the company (and his residence) there, renaming it John Inglis and Sons after five of his sons that worked in various departments. John Inglis died in 1898 and is buried at Woodlawn Memorial Park in Guelph. The business was taken over by one of his sons, William (b. 1868). In 1903, William Inglis led the company into the manufacture of marine steam engines and waterworks pumping engines, and he discontinued production of its previous milling product line. The company produced the engines for the Canada Steamship Lines ships Hamonic and Huronic, which served until 1950.

The company reincorporated in 1913 as the John Inglis Company Limited. During World War I, the company turned out thousands of shells and shell forgings, and more than 40 steam marine engines for freighters. Among products manufactured in the 1920s were boilers, grain elevating and conveying machinery, hydraulic turbines, tugs, and reciprocating and centrifugal pumps.

The Great Depression seriously affected the company and led to major losses during the 1930s. When William died in 1935, the company went into receivership. A new Toronto Island ferry built by the company was named after him shortly after his death.

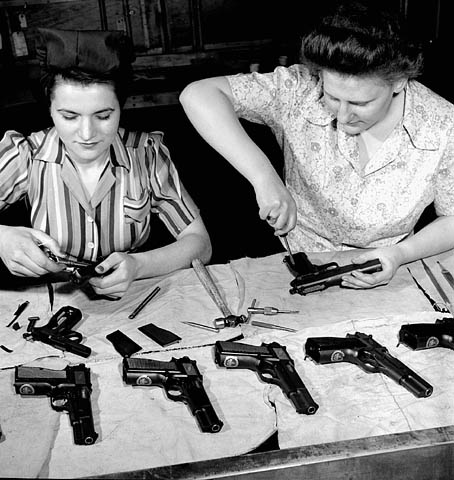
Workers assemble Browning Hi-Power pistols at the Inglis munitions plant in Toronto, April 1944

In 1937, the company was purchased by Major J. E. Hahn of Toronto, owner of British Canadian Engineering Limited, who took on the name John Inglis and Company. In March 1938, the company won a contract with the British and Canadian governments to supply 5,000 Bren machine guns to Great Britain and 7,000 to Canada. Both countries shared the capital costs of creating a factory to produce them. Inglis started production in 1940, and the contracts were extended several times. By 1943, they were producing 60% of the Bren machine guns destined for the British Commonwealth forces, and 30% of the British Army's own requirements. They also produced a large proportion of the Polsten 20 mm autocannon for the British Commonwealth, as well as the Browning Hi-Power (or High Power) pistol for both the Commonwealth nations and other Canadian allies (primarily the Nationalist Chinese Army). They also produced the machinery for four Tribal-class destroyers.

After the war, Inglis entered the consumer products business, producing fishing tackle, house trailers, oil burner pumps and domestic heaters and stoves. In 1946, they licensed production of a wringer washer being manufactured in the US by the Nineteen Hundred Corporation (now Whirlpool Corporation). A fully automatic washer was added in 1950, and the line continued to expand to include electric and gas dryers, and dishwashers.

Early in 1945, the company had acquired a controlling interest in the English Electric Company of Canada in St. Catharines, Ontario, which became a wholly owned subsidiary in 1947. In 1951, they completed a new plant in Scarborough, Ontario to produce the English Electric Yarrows-100 naval steam turbine under license for Canadian destroyers, including the St. Laurent and Restigouche classes. The plant was purchased by English Electric in 1955 and leased back to Inglis. Inglis later built a new addition to house the former St. Catharines works, which were shut down.

In 1962, Inglis purchased the Scarborough plant back from the English Electric. However, three years later, they sold it off to General Electric Canada, and in 1966 sold off a majority of their shares in English Electric Canada to its UK parent in order to concentrate on the consumer products field exclusively.

By 1966, Inglis had become the leading producer of Canadian-built laundry machines. In 1967, a refrigerator plant was opened near Green Road and South Service Road in Stoney Creek, Ontario, and production of dehumidifiers was added there in 1970 (now home to Mondelez). In 1972, Inglis produced its one-millionth automatic washer and began manufacturing and selling appliances under the Whirlpool brand name. A year later, the company began operating under the name Inglis Limited. New operations were opened in Laval, Quebec (now as Maison Corbeil Distribution Centre), in the late 1970s, along with expansions of their Toronto operations. In 1982, Inglis purchased parts of Canadian Admiral Corporation, and sold some of their appliances under that name.

In 1981, the company moved its head office to Mississauga, Ontario, and starting the next year, the downtown Toronto operations were slowly sold off. As of 2010, the former location on Strachan Avenue, along with the nearby Massey Ferguson plants, were being redeveloped as housing and commercial space within an area now referred to as Liberty Village. Until July 2014, all that remained was the landmark giant blue and white Inglis billboard, installed in 1975 on a small part of one of the old buildings not demolished. It was aimed at the Gardiner Expressway and frequently flashed inspirational quotes to passing motorists. The sign was removed in July 2014 after Whirlpool and Pattison Outdoor Advertising decided that condo buildings were obscuring the view of the sign and it was no longer viable.

=== Fate ===
Whirlpool Corporation acquired a majority interest of Inglis in 1987 and changed the company's name to Whirlpool Canada in 2001. "Inglis" is now a brand of household appliances from Whirlpool marketed only in Canada. Inglis appliances are sold exclusively at The Brick stores.

In March 2002, Whirlpool announced it would close its last manufacturing facility in Canada, the Inglis plant in Montmagny, Quebec, by 2004, terminating 500 workers and shifting production to facilities in Tulsa, Oklahoma and Oxford Mississippi.
