= Huronic =

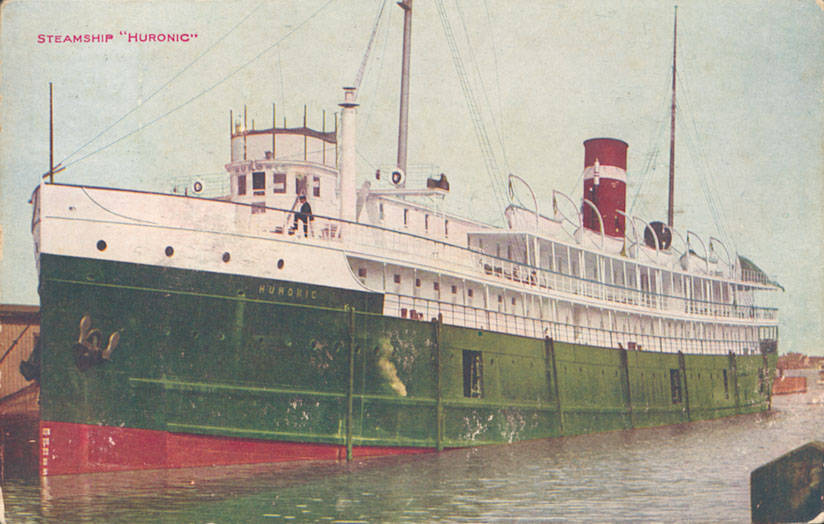
- SS Huronic

History
- Name: Huronic
- Owner: Northern Navigation Company (after 1913 as subsidiary of Richelieu & Ontario Navigation and 1922 as Canada Steamship Lines), Canada Steamship Lines 1922-1949
- Operator: Northern Navigation Company (after 1913 as subsidiary of Richelieu & Ontario Navigation and 1922 as Canada Steamship Lines) 1901-1922, Canada Steamship Lines 1922-1949
- Port of registry: Collingwood, Ontario
- Route: Collingwood - Toronto (until 1928)
- Builder: Collingwood Shipbuilding Company
- Launched: September 1, 1901
- Christened: Miss Long
- In service: 1902-1949
- Out of service: 1949
- Fate: Sold for scrap in Hamilton, Ontario 1949
- Notes: Passenger service until 1930s

General characteristics
- Class & type: Steamer
- Type: Passenger ship / Package freighter
- Tonnage: 3,330 GRT
- Length: 308 ft (93.9 m)
- Beam: 43 ft (13.1 m)
- Depth: 27 ft (8.2 m)
- Decks: 3
- Propulsion: coal-fired Scotch boilers, triple expansion steam engine (by John Inglis and Company), 2,350 ihp (1,750 kW), single shaft, 1 Screw
- Speed: 15.5 miles per hour (24.9 km/h)
- Capacity: +200 passengers

Huronic was part of a fleet of passenger vessels built for service on the Great Lakes (and namely in Collingwood area). She was designed by Hugh Calderwood, Manager of Collingwood Shipbuilding. She was retired in late 1949, a few months after her sister ship, Noronic, had a catastrophic fire, at her moorings, in Toronto, Ontario, killing 119 of her passengers. She was launched, in Collingwood, Ontario, in 1901.

Huronic ran aground in 1913, off Whitefish Point, in Lake Superior. There was no loss of life, although many other vessels that ran aground during the same storm did lose lives.

Huronic ran aground again in 1928, and was then refloated, off Isle Royale, in Lake Superior.

Other ships in the fleet included Noronic, Hamonic, Doric (1903), and Ionic.

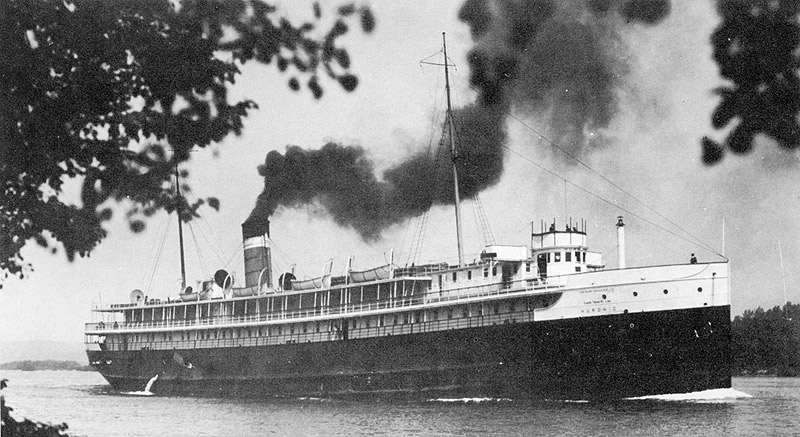
Huronic on the St. Marys River in 1916.
