= Metamora (shipwreck) =

Wooden tug wrecked in the Georgian Bay area of Ontario

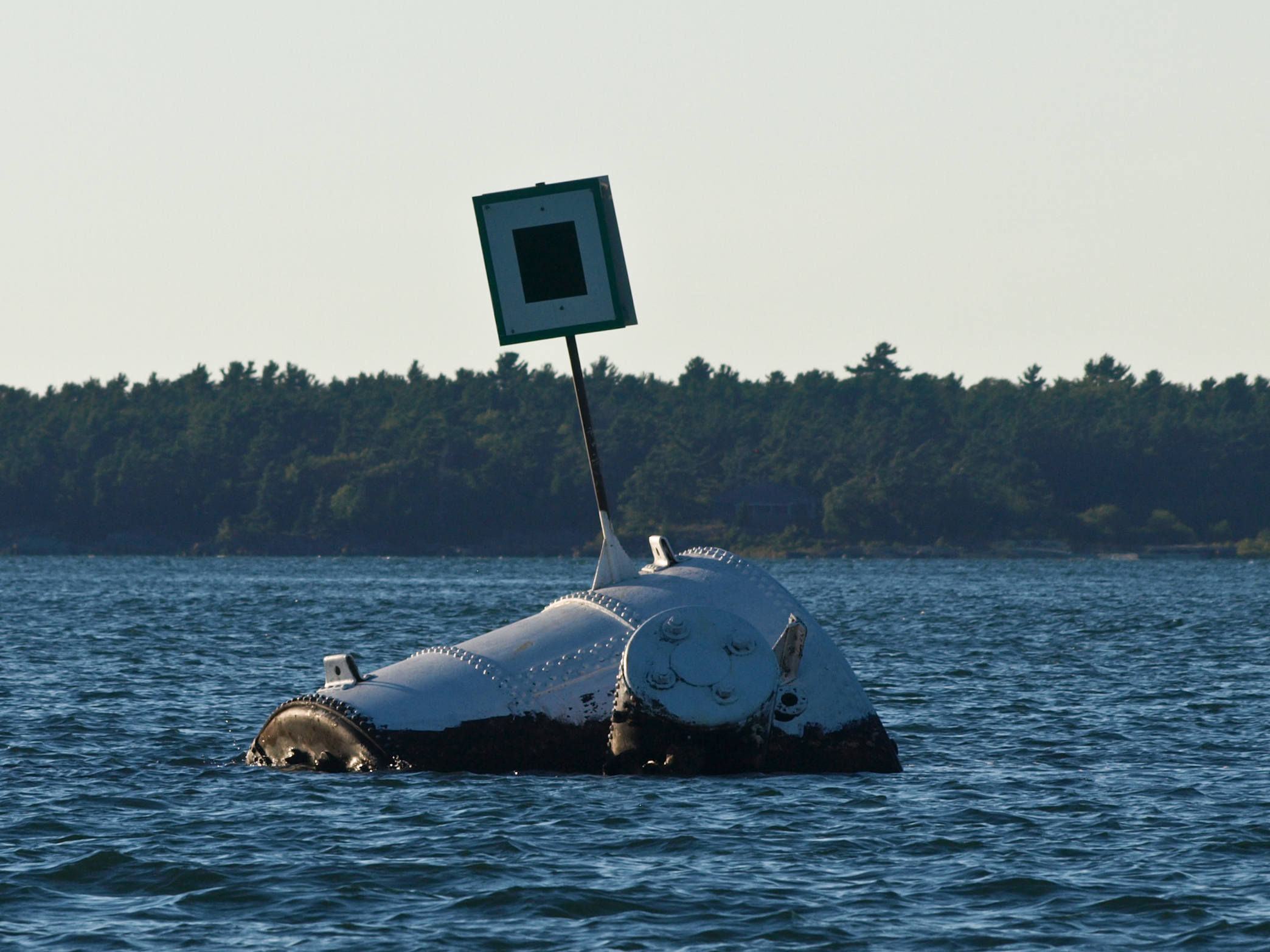
- The above-water remains of the wreck of the tug Metamora. Visible is the ship′s boiler, which has been painted white and has a channel marker attached to it as a hazard warning.

History
- Name: Metamora
- Builder: Peck & Masters, Cleveland
- Completed: 1864
- Fate: Ran into a shallow shoal off of Turning Island, Georgian Bay, September 29, 1907

General characteristics
- Class & type: Tug
- Tonnage: 300 tons
- Length: 121 feet
- Beam: 21 feet
- Installed power: Steam

The Metamora was a wooden tug commissioned in 1864 and used predominantly for ferrying passengers and goods in the Georgian Bay area of Ontario. It ran onto a shallow shoal near Turning Island in Georgian Bay on July 30, 1907, caught fire and sank in six feet of water.

She was constructed at the Peck & Masters shipyard in Cleveland, Ohio in 1864. The ship was 121 feet long, and 21 feet wide, and displaced about 300 tons. The Metamora was originally fitted out with armour-plating and a cannon, and was tasked with patrolling the waters of what was then Upper Canada for Fenian raiders. These were removed in the 1870s, when the Fenian threat had diminished, and the Metamora then plied the waters of Georgian Bay as a freighter and passenger vessel. It was being used primarily as a logging tug boat, by the Burton Bros. of Collingwood in 1895, Midland lumbermen James Playfair & Company purchased the Metamora along with three barges and a large quantity of boom logs, for use in connection with their lumbering business.

== Sinking and wreck ==
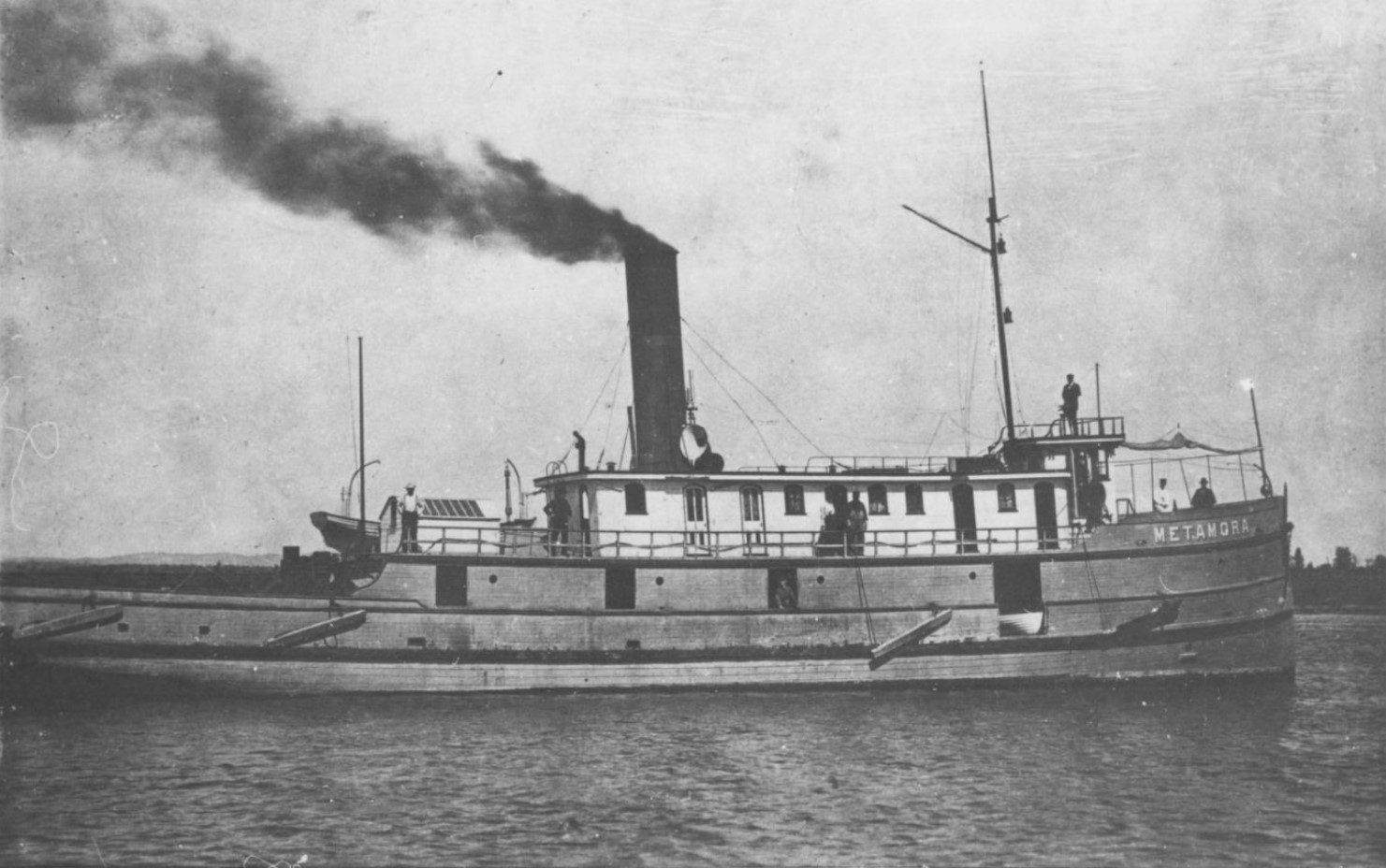
The tug Metamora prior to her sinking

On September 29, 1907 the Metamora was towing a boom, bound for the mill town of Byng Inlet, when she struck a shallow shoal just west of Turning Island, relatively near Pointe au Baril. She caught fire and sank in shallow water, with all of her crew and passengers surviving by swimming the relatively short distance to shore. The Metamora was owned by the Midland Towing and Wrecking Co.

For many years afterward a portion of the upper deck that did not burn was visible above the water. Currently the Metamora's boiler is the only portion of the ship that can still be seen above the surface. It is known locally as "The Wreck". The boiler has been painted white and a channel marker has been attached to it as a hazard warning for the boats that travel in this area. The shallow waters have also made the ship a favourite haunt for scuba divers. The wreck is located at 45°31′43.39″N 80°24′26.61″W.
