= Huronia Museum =

Coordinates: 44.7421°N 79.8813°W

- Established: 1947
- Location: Midland, Ontario, Canada
- Type: history museum and heritage village
- Website: huroniamuseum.com

The Huronia Museum is located in Midland, Ontario, Canada. The museum consists of the museum building (housing collections and art gallery) and the Wendat (Huron/Ouendat) village (palisade and longhouse). The museum is open year-round and has nearly one million objects and receives some 20,000 visitors each year. The collections include artifacts pertaining to native history and maritime history. The museum provides educational programmes for schools and adults.

== History ==
On July 1, 1947, the Huronia Museum first opened in a large wooden frame building that had been the family residence of James Playfair, a prominent Midland businessman. The current museum building was Midland's Canada Centennial project and officially opened on July 1, 1967 in Little Lake Park adjacent to the Huron/Ouendat (Wendat) Village.

== Exhibits ==
In 1976, the Historic Art of Huronia Gallery in the museum building opened and presently displays art by David Milne, Homer Watson, Manly MacDonald, Franklin Arbuckle, Hilton Hassell, Mary Hallen (Victorian era watercolours), William J. Wood, Thor Hansen, Group of Seven artists (A.Y. Jackson, Franz Johnston, J. E. H. MacDonald) along with contemporary art, native art and archaeological collections of Ouendat and Ojibway First Nations. Other exhibits are about Georgian Bay lighthouses, shipwrecks, maritime and military heritage. There is also an extensive photographic collection of the work of Midland's long-time professional photographer, John W. Bald.

== Huron Village ==
The Huron Village represents what Huron life was like between AD 1500-1600, just prior to the arrival of Europeans. The village has the following components: shaman's lodge, wigwam, masks, fish racks, longhouse, corn field, bone pit, fur drying rack, burial rack. The Huron Village was created by W. Wilfrid Jury (1890–1981), Director of the Museum of Indian Archaeology and Pioneer Life at the University of Western Ontario in London. The village is modeled on Jury's work on the excavation of the pre-contact Forget site near Midland. The village originally opened in 1956. In May 2007, a fire destroyed three quarters of the village but has since reopened to the public.

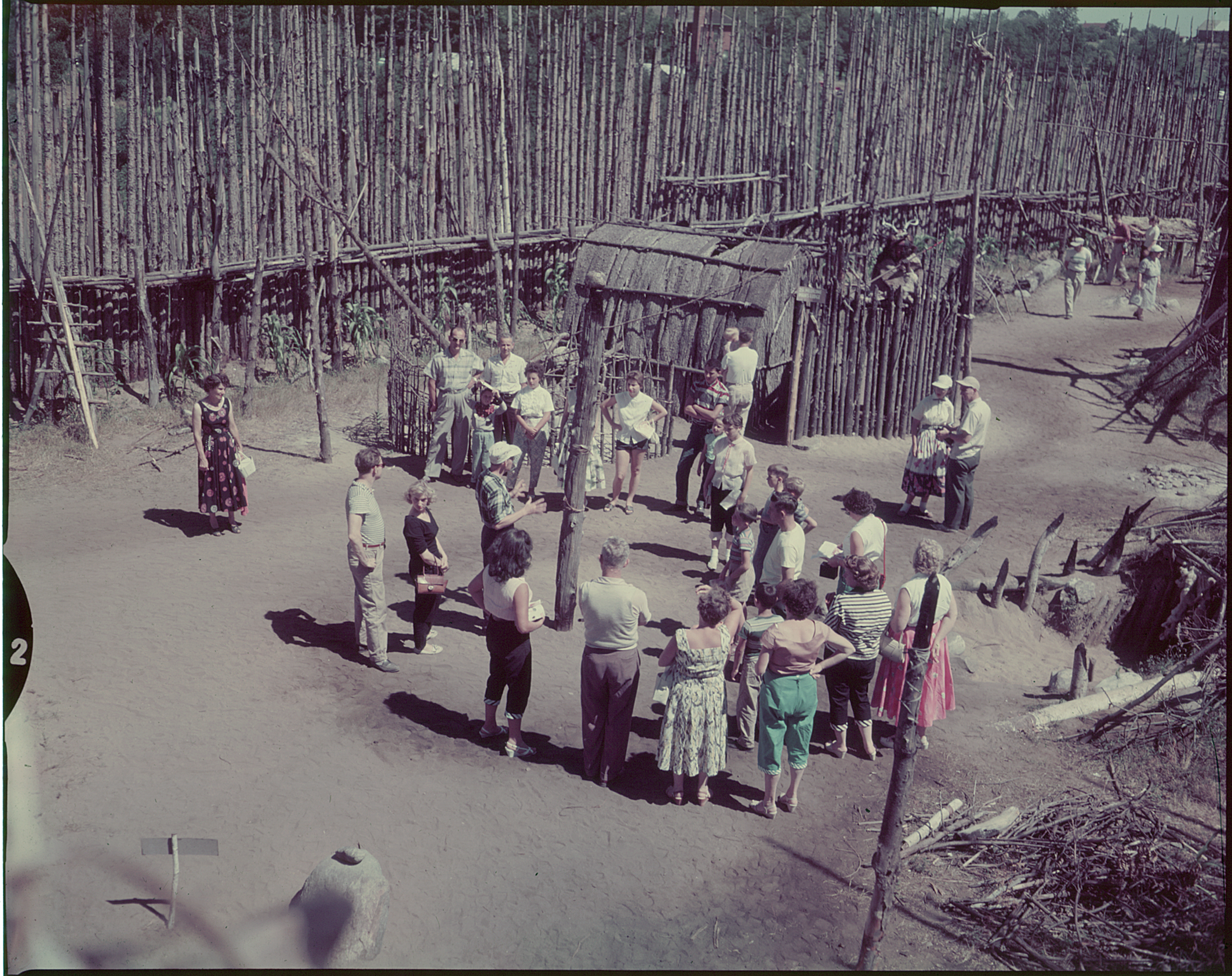
Huronia Museum in Little Lake Park, Midland, 1958

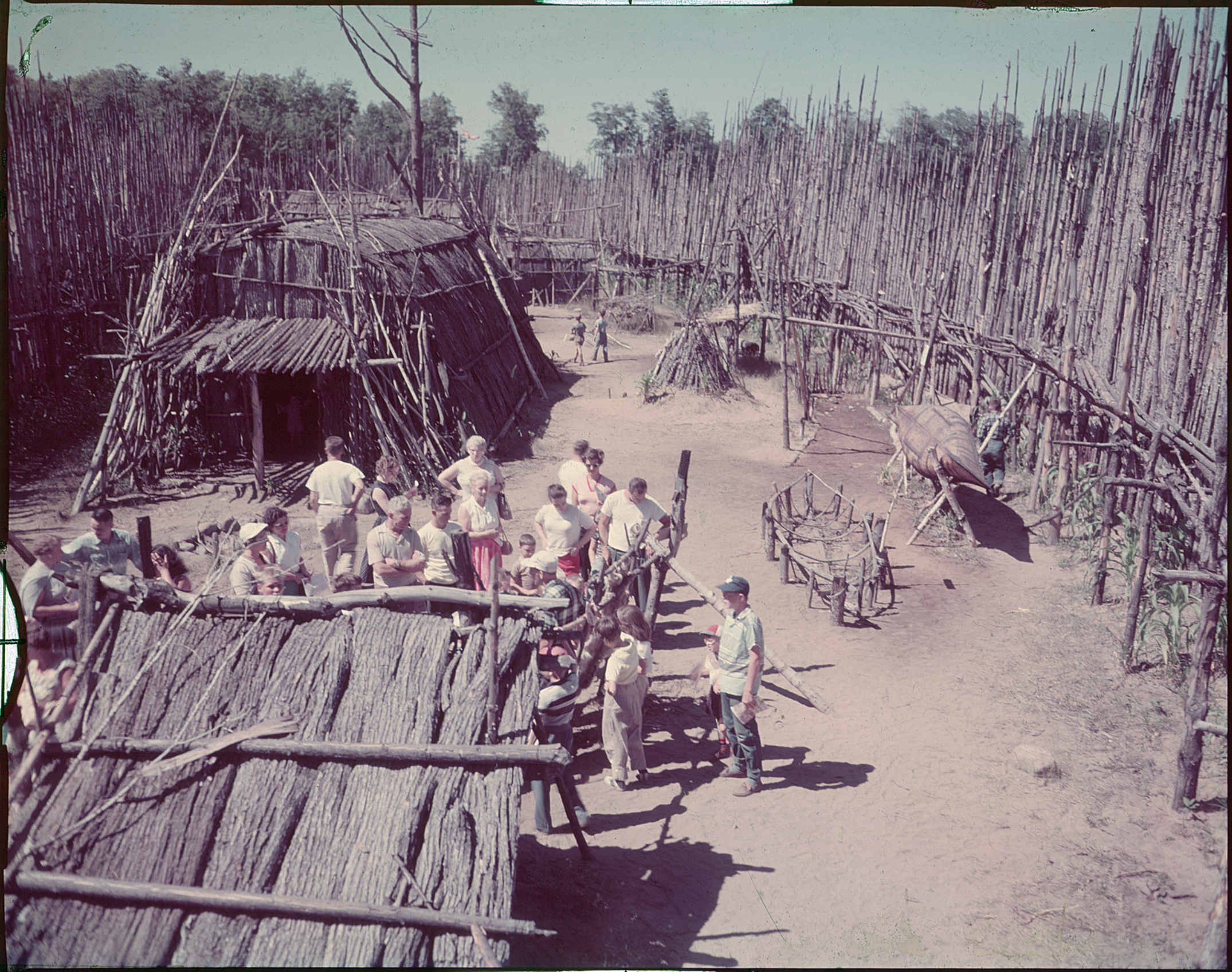
Huronia Museum in Little Lake Park, Midland, 1958

== Affiliations ==
The Museum is affiliated with: CMA, CHIN, and Virtual Museum of Canada.
