= Midland, Ontario =

Midland
- Town (lower-tier)
- Town of Midland
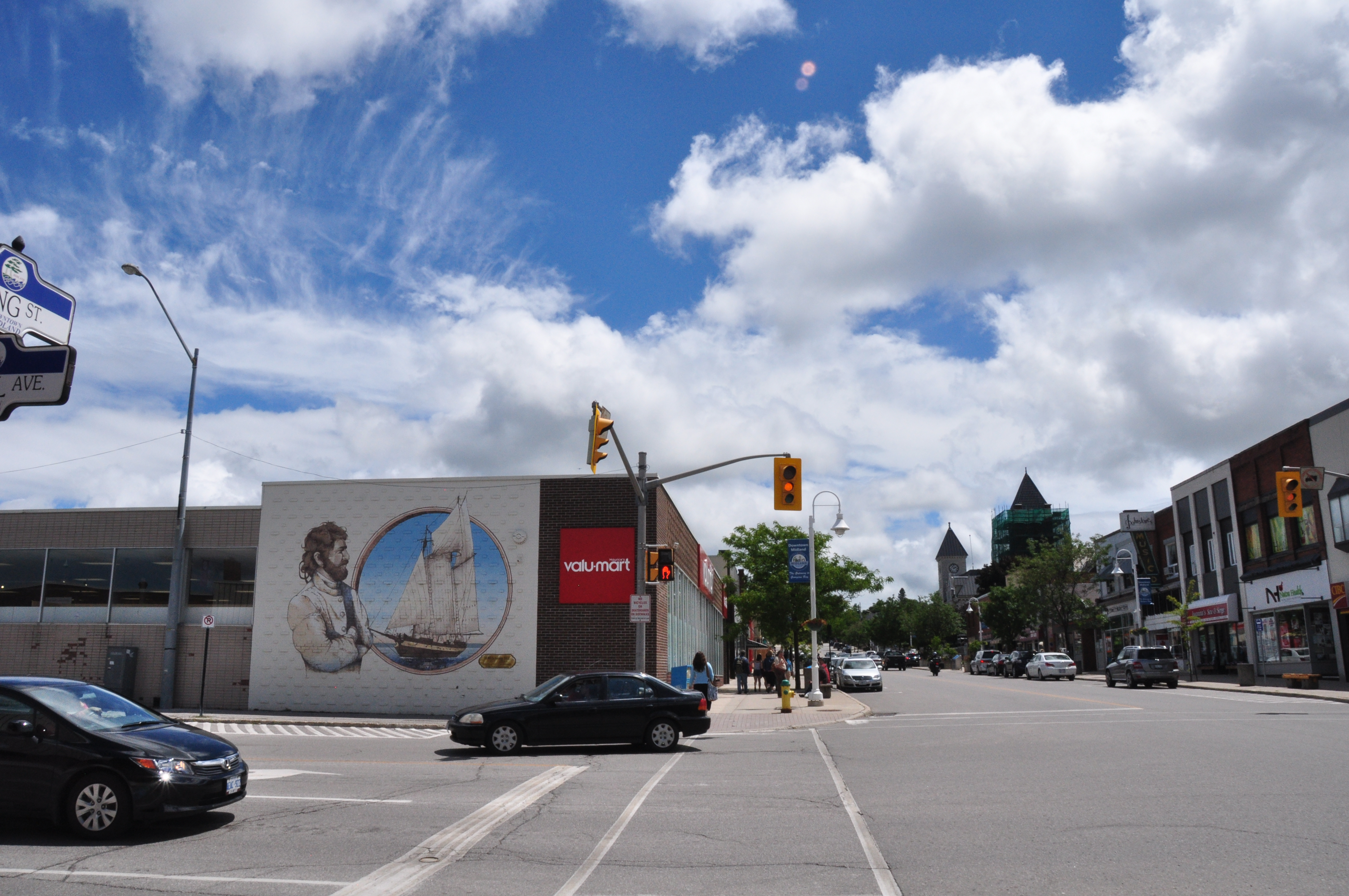
- Downtown Midland

- Coat of arms

- Location within Simcoe County Location within Southern Ontario
- Coordinates: 44°45′N 79°53′W
- Country: Canada
- Province: Ontario
- County: Simcoe
- Incorporated: 1890

Government
  - Mayor: Bill Gordon
  - Governing Body: Midland Town Council
  - MPs: Adam Chambers
  - MPPs: Jill Dunlop

Area
  - Land: 35.33 km^{2} (13.64 sq mi)
  - Metro: 60.75 km^{2} (23.46 sq mi)
- Metro area consists of Midland and Penetanguishene.

Population (2021)
  - Total: 17,817
  - Density: 504.3/km^{2} (1,306/sq mi)
  - Metro: 27,894
  - Metro density: 459.1/km^{2} (1,189/sq mi)
- Time zone: UTC-5 (Eastern (EST))
  - Summer (DST): UTC-4 (EDT)
- Postal code FSA: L4R
- Area code(s): 705
- Website: www.midland.ca

Midland is a town located on Georgian Bay in Simcoe County, Ontario, Canada. It is part of the Huronia/Wendake region of Central Ontario.

Located at the southern end of Georgian Bay's 30,000 Islands, Midland is the economic centre of the region, with a 125-bed hospital and a local airport (Midland/Huronia Airport). It is the main town of the southern Georgian Bay area. In the summer months, the area's population grows to over 100,000 with seasonal visitors to more than 8,000 cottages, resort hotels, provincial and national parks in the surrounding municipalities of Penetanguishene, Tiny, Tay, and Beausoleil First Nation.

== History ==
The town of Midland was founded when, in 1871, the Midland Railway of Canada selected the sparsely populated community of Mundy's Bay as the new terminus of the Midland railway. At that time the Midland railway ran from Port Hope to Beaverton. The town site was surveyed in 1872–3 and the line to the town was completed by 1879. Settlers, attracted by the convenience of rail service, soon began to move into the area. The company sold off lots in town (Midland City) to help finance the settlement. The village (incorporated in 1878) thrived based on Georgian Bay shipping and the lumber and grain trade. Incorporated into a town in 1890, a number of light industrial companies have established themselves in the area and tourism in the southern Georgian Bay area also contributes to the economy.

=== 2010 tornado ===
On June 23, 2010, Midland was struck by an F2 tornado, causing $15 million in damage. The most significant damage was reported at Smith's Camp, a trailer park at the south end of the town, where several mobile homes were completely destroyed. At one point, for the first time in 25 years, Emergency Management Ontario upgraded Environment Canada's tornado warning to an extreme severe weather warning called "Red Alert" which was issued for most of Southern Ontario's cottage country due to the approaching severe weather and the possibility of violent tornadoes, informing residents in the area that they should seek shelter. In addition, a State of emergency was also declared in Midland. While electrical service was knocked out for a time, there were no fatalities caused by the storm.

== Geography ==
Midland is located at the south end of the Georgian Bay and is the northern anchor of the Simcoe County. Midland has rolling hills, agricultural farms along with the rugged terrain of the Canadian shield. On the east side of midland there is a wetland system notably called the Wye Marsh Wildlife Centre.

=== Climate ===
Midland has a humid continental climate under the Köppen climate classification (Köppen Dfb) and has four distinct seasons. The climate is nearly the same as much of Southern Ontario and has balmy summers and chilly winters. Thunderstorms, hailstorms, snowstorms, lake effect snow, and freezing rain are also common for this city.

Climate data for Midland (Midland Water Pollution Control Plant), 1981−2010 normals
Month	Jan	Feb	Mar	Apr	May	Jun	Jul	Aug	Sep	Oct	Nov	Dec	Year
Record high °C (°F)	14.0 (57.2)	15.0 (59.0)	23.5 (74.3)	30.0 (86.0)	34.0 (93.2)	35.5 (95.9)	34.5 (94.1)	34.5 (94.1)	32.5 (90.5)	30.0 (86.0)	22.0 (71.6)	18.0 (64.4)	35.5 (95.9)
Mean daily maximum °C (°F)	−3.7 (25.3)	−1.5 (29.3)	3.0 (37.4)	10.9 (51.6)	17.4 (63.3)	23.2 (73.8)	25.6 (78.1)	24.6 (76.3)	20.4 (68.7)	13.3 (55.9)	6.4 (43.5)	0.5 (32.9)	11.7 (53.1)
Daily mean °C (°F)	−8.5 (16.7)	−6.4 (20.5)	−1.9 (28.6)	5.8 (42.4)	12.2 (54.0)	18.1 (64.6)	20.8 (69.4)	19.9 (67.8)	15.9 (60.6)	9.3 (48.7)	3.2 (37.8)	−3.1 (26.4)	7.1 (44.8)
Mean daily minimum °C (°F)	−13.2 (8.2)	−11.4 (11.5)	−6.7 (19.9)	0.7 (33.3)	7.0 (44.6)	12.9 (55.2)	15.9 (60.6)	15.2 (59.4)	11.4 (52.5)	5.3 (41.5)	−0.1 (31.8)	−6.7 (19.9)	2.5 (36.5)
Record low °C (°F)	−36 (−33)	−36 (−33)	−31 (−24)	−16.5 (2.3)	−3 (27)	2.0 (35.6)	4.0 (39.2)	4.0 (39.2)	0.0 (32.0)	−4.5 (23.9)	−19 (−2)	−31 (−24)	−36 (−33)
Average precipitation mm (inches)	109.8 (4.32)	69.9 (2.75)	65.7 (2.59)	65.1 (2.56)	92.8 (3.65)	89.5 (3.52)	72.7 (2.86)	77.9 (3.07)	99.1 (3.90)	90.1 (3.55)	103.6 (4.08)	104.4 (4.11)	1,040.6 (40.97)
Average rainfall mm (inches)	21.5 (0.85)	20.9 (0.82)	36.1 (1.42)	59.3 (2.33)	92.8 (3.65)	89.5 (3.52)	72.7 (2.86)	77.9 (3.07)	99.1 (3.90)	88.0 (3.46)	74.8 (2.94)	27.5 (1.08)	760 (29.9)
Average snowfall cm (inches)	88.3 (34.8)	49.3 (19.4)	29.6 (11.7)	5.9 (2.3)	0.0 (0.0)	0.0 (0.0)	0.0 (0.0)	0.0 (0.0)	0.0 (0.0)	2.1 (0.8)	28.9 (11.4)	76.9 (30.3)	280.9 (110.6)
Average precipitation days (≥ 0.2 mm)	17	11.7	11.2	11.6	13.1	11.1	10.3	11.1	12.9	15.6	16.4	16.8	158.6
Average rainy days (≥ 0.2 mm)	3.2	3.1	5.2	10.1	13.1	11.1	10.3	11.1	12.9	15.3	12.1	5.3	113.1
Average snowy days (≥ 0.2 cm)	14.7	9.4	6.7	2	0.0	0.0	0.0	0.0	0.0	0.70	5.5	12	51
Source: Environment Canada

== Demographics ==
In the 2021 Census of Population conducted by Statistics Canada, Midland had a population of 17,817 living in 7,849 of its 8,295 total private dwellings, a change of 5.7% from its 2016 population of 16,864. With a land area of 35.33 km^{2} (13.64 sq mi), it had a population density of 504.3/km^{2} (1,306.1/sq mi) in 2021.

Canada census – Midland community profile

	2021	2016	2011
Population	17,817 (+5.7% from 2016)	16,864 (+1.8% from 2011)	16,572 (+1.5% from 2006)
Land area	35.33 km^{2} (13.64 sq mi)	35.34 km^{2} (13.64 sq mi)	35.37 km^{2} (13.66 sq mi)
Population density	504.3/km^{2} (1,306/sq mi)	477.3/km^{2} (1,236/sq mi)	468.5/km^{2} (1,213/sq mi)
Median age	50.0 (M: 47.6, F: 52.4)	50.1 (M: 48.2, F: 51.6)
Private dwellings	8,295 (total) 7,849 (occupied)	7,739 (total)	7,680 (total)
Median household income	$69,500	$54,878

References: 2021 2016 2011

Historical census populations – Midland, Ontario

Year	Pop.	±%
1881	1,095	—
1891	2,088	+90.7%
1901	3,174	+52.0%
1911	4,663	+46.9%
1921	7,016	+50.5%
1931	6,920	−1.4%
1941	6,800	−1.7%
1951	7,206	+6.0%

Year	Pop.	±%
1956	8,250	+14.5%
1961	8,656	+4.9%
1966	10,129	+17.0%
1971	10,992	+8.5%
1976	11,639	+5.9%
1981	12,132	+4.2%
1986	12,092	−0.3%
1991	13,865	+14.7%

Year	Pop.	±%
1996	15,035	+8.4%
2001	16,214	+7.8%
2006	16,330	+0.7%
2011	16,572	+1.5%
2016	16,864	+1.8%
2021	17,817	+5.7%

2006 Population figure based on revised count. Population counts are not adjusted for boundary changes.
Source: Statistics Canada

== Economy ==
Since 1952 ELCAN (Ernest Leitz CANada) is located in Ontario; it was founded in 1952 by Leica Camera and is owned by Raytheon Technologies since 1999.

== Local attractions ==
Around the centre of Midland there are a number of murals, most of which were painted by now deceased artist Fred Lenz. The largest, depicting a meeting between a local native and Jesuit missionary Jean de Brebeuf is on the silos overlooking the main harbour. This work was completed by Lenz's sons following his death in 2001.

Notable sites in or near Midland include the Jesuit mission of Sainte-Marie among the Hurons, which is now a living museum depicting missionary life in the 17th century. The Martyrs' Shrine is a Roman Catholic church commemorating the Canadian Martyrs, eight missionaries from Sainte-Marie who were martyred during the Wendat-Haudenosaunee wars. Pope John Paul II held a pastoral meeting at this site in September 1984.

The Huronia Museum is a history and art museum which features the Huron Village, a reconstruction of a typical Wendat/Ouendat (Huron) village.

The Wye Marsh Wildlife Centre is nearby. The marsh provides habitat for trumpeter swans, black terns and least bitterns. The trumpeter swan is considered a symbol of Midland and a large statue of one has been erected by the harbour.

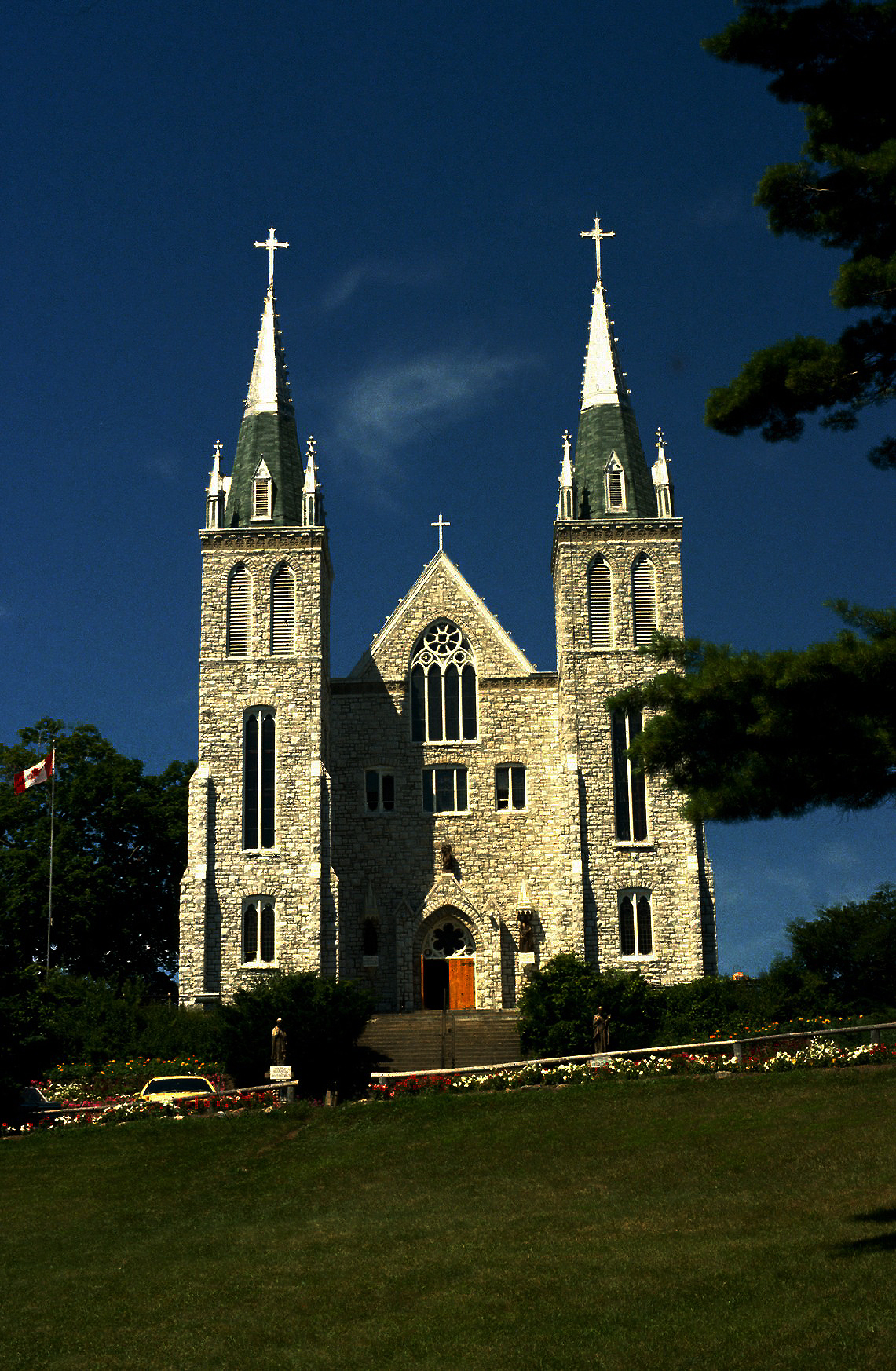
Martyrs' Shrine

An annual Butter tart festival, inaugurated in 2013, is held in early June. In 2016, the fourth annual Butter tart Festival sold more 100,000 butter tarts. Many tourists flock to Midland during the festival. There are two divisions: amateur and commercial. The day after the Butter tart festival is the Butter Tart Trot, a 5-km fun run for older people and a 2.5-km run for children under 5 years old.

Little Lake Park is a tourist destination in the summer months. The park has a refreshment stand and a number of sports facilities including volleyball courts, a baseball field, skateboard park, disc golf course.

The Midland Cultural Centre is a hub for various cultural activities, located in the core of downtown Midland. The Centre is home to the Huronia Players, Quest Art School and Gallery, and Rotary Hall.

== Sports activities ==
Midland is the home of The Midland Flyers Ice Hockey Club of the Provincial Junior Hockey League in the Carruthers division in the Ontario Hockey Association. It is also the home of the Midland Minor Hockey Association. Midland North Simcoe Sports & Recreation Centre is the home rink of these teams. The NSSRC is also the location of the Midland Sports Hall of Fame.

Boating, both power and sail, is very popular with several marinas and a sailing club based in the town. The town has easy access to the relatively sheltered waters of southeastern Georgian Bay. Among the marinas nearby are Bay Port Yachting Centre on the northwest side of the bay, and Wye Heritage Marina along the southeast shore. There is also good fishing.

Midland also has an ever-growing and active cycling base. The Midland Tri Club has increased the number of road riders in the area. Many of these riders also participate in the popular weekly Time Trial series and group rides throughout the summer months. Mountain View Ski Centre has also encouraged the growth of mountain bikers, with an extensive trail system in town. The Centre hosts a variety of races, including a summer-long weekly series, as well as a night race, high school event, and 9-hour relay. Also, an MTB club has been borne of the Centre, expanding its breadth into competition and other pursuits. The provincial cyclo-cross championships will be hosted in Midland on November 13, 2016, as part of the Silver Goose CX Race.

In the winter, snowmobiling and ice fishing are popular activities. Mountain-view Ski Centre has 25 kilometres (16 mi) of cross-country ski trails.

== Transportation ==
Midland is served by the Simcoe County LINX inter-community bus service on its Route 1 - Penetanguishene / Midland to Barrie.

Local public transportation is provided by Midland Penetanguishene Transit.

== Media ==
MidlandToday.ca is an online local news source, and The Midland Mirror is a local print paper (MetroLand Media Group ceased production in September 2023).

== Notable people ==
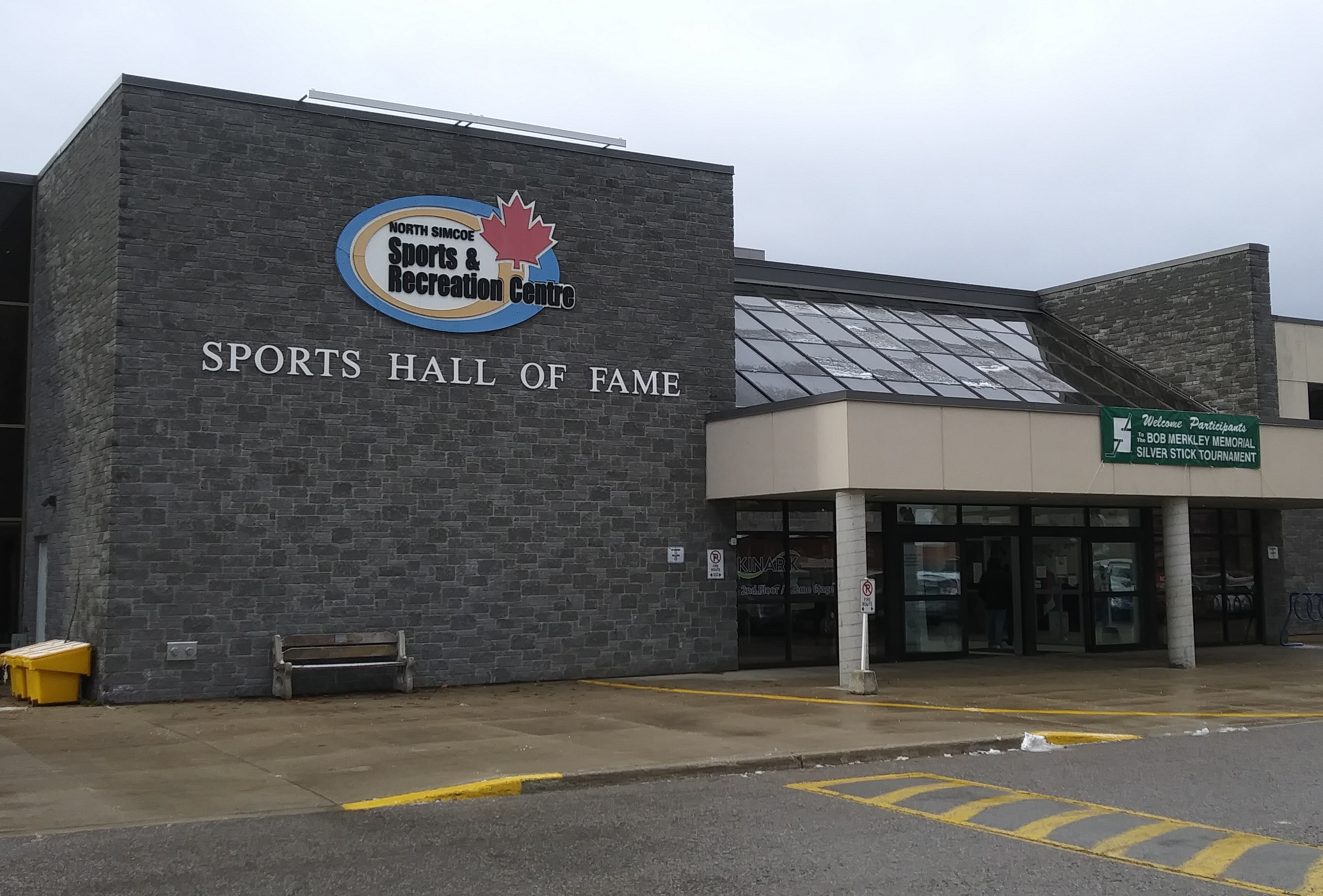
Midland Sports Hall of Fame at the North Simcoe Sports and Recreation Centre

- John W. Bald, photographer
- Born Ruffians, indie rock band
- Mark Bourrie, author
- Sarah Burke, freestyle skier, three-time Winter X-Games gold medalist
- Roy Conacher, former NHL hockey player and Hockey Hall of Fame inductee
- Shayne Corson, former NHL hockey player
- Adam Dixon, paralympian (sledge hockey)
- Peter Donaldson, stage, TV & film actor (Stratford Festival, Road to Avonlea, The Sweet Hereafter)
- Herb Drury, former NHL and Olympic hockey player
- George Dudley, inductee of the Hockey Hall of Fame, president and secretary-manager of the Canadian Amateur Hockey Association
- William Finlayson, politician and lawyer
- Chris Heintz (1938-2021), French-Canadian aeronautical engineer
- Jack Hendrickson, former NHL hockey player
- Glenn Howard, world champion curler
- Russ Howard, Olympic champion curler
- Scott Howard, world champion curler
- Wayne King, former NHL hockey player
- James LaBrie, Grammy award winning musician, lead singer of Dream Theater since 1991.
- Alex McKendry, former NHL Hockey player
- John Muckler, NHL coach
- David Onley, former CITY-TV reporter and former Lieutenant Governor of Ontario
- James Playfair, businessman
- Mike Robitaille, former NHL hockey player
- Angela Schmidt-Foster, former Olympic athlete
- Susan Swan, writer
- Steve Wolfhard, artist
- Richard B. Wright, writer

== See also ==
- List of towns in Ontario
- List of census agglomerations in Ontario
