= Hamonic (steamship) =

Passenger steamship which burned down, yet killed no passengers

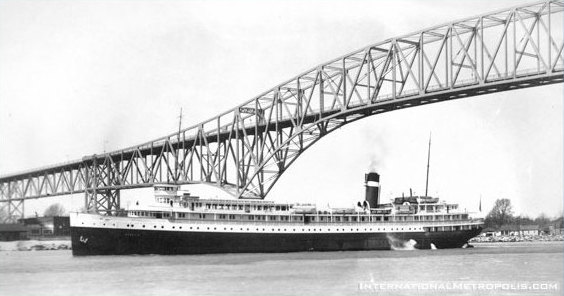
- Hamonic passing under the Blue Water Bridge

History
- Name: Hamonic
- Owner: Northern Navigation Company
- Operator: Northern Navigation Company
- Port of registry: Collingwood, Ontario
- Route: Detroit-Port Arthur/Fort William-Duluth
- Builder: Collingwood Shipbuilding Company
- Launched: 1909
- Fate: Burned July 17, 1945 at Sarnia, Ontario and scrapped 1946

General characteristics
- Type: Great Lakes Passenger ship/freighter
- Length: 341 ft (103.9 m)
- Beam: 50 ft (15.2 m)
- Depth: 25 ft (7.6 m)
- Decks: 4
- Installed power: Coal-fired Scotch boilers, quadruple expansion engine (by John Inglis and Company
- Propulsion: 6,000 ihp (4,500 kW) single shaft/propeller

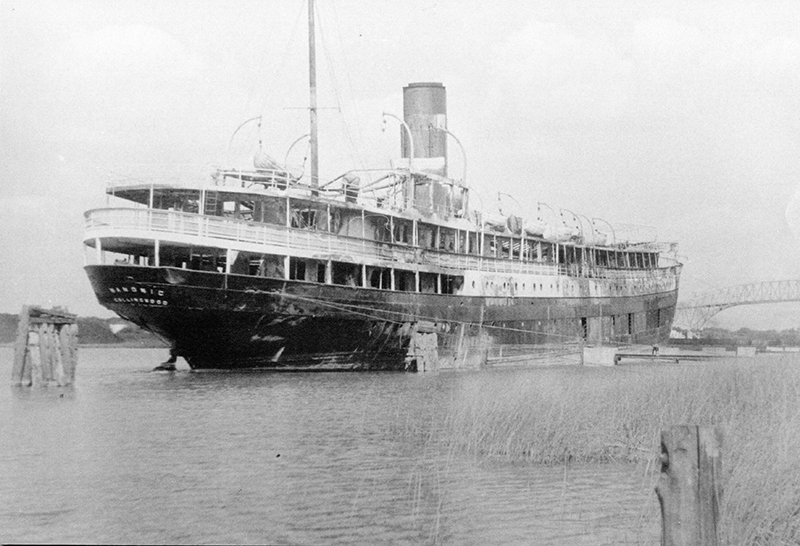
The wreck of Hamonic

Hamonic was a passenger vessel designed for service on the Great Lakes. She was launched in 1909, and served until she burned, in a catastrophic fire, at Sarnia, Ontario, on July 17, 1945.

Elmer Kleinsmith, a crane operator, operating a crane designed to load and unload coal, was near enough to use his crane's bucket, to rescue the ship's complement. Some sources say there were no fatalities, others say there was a single fatality.

Other members of her fleet included Huronic, Doric, and Ionic.
