= Chippewas of Georgina Island First Nation 33A =

- Indian reserve
- Chippewas of Georgina Island First Nation Indian Reserve No. 33A
- Location within Southern Ontario
- Coordinates: 44°19′37″N 79°17′14″W
- Country: Canada
- Province: Ontario
- Regional municipality: York
- First Nation: Chippewas of Georgina Island

Area
  - Land: 0.01 km^{2} (0.0039 sq mi)

Chippewas of Georgina Island First Nation 33A is a First Nations reserve near the shores of Lake Simcoe. It is one of three reserves of the Chippewas of Georgina Island First Nation. It is an enclave within Georgina, Ontario, surrounded by the unincorporated community of Virginia Beach. It is separated from the mainland portion of the Chippewas of Georgina Island First Nation reserve by Black River Road and the private properties along it.
