= Strawberry Island =

There are several islands named Strawberry Island:

- Strawberry Island (Lake Simcoe) - Ontario
- Strawberry Island (Deception Pass, Washington)
- Strawberry Island (Rosario Strait, Washington)
- Strawberry Island, in the Snake River near the confluence with the Columbia River, Franklin County, Washington
- Strawberry Island (New York), an island in the Niagara River
- Strawberry Island (Hamilton County, New York), an island on Raquette Lake

== See also ==
- Strawberry Islands, a chain of islands in Wisconsin
