= Snake Island (Lake Simcoe) =

Island in Ontario, Canada

Coordinates: 44°19′N 79°29′W

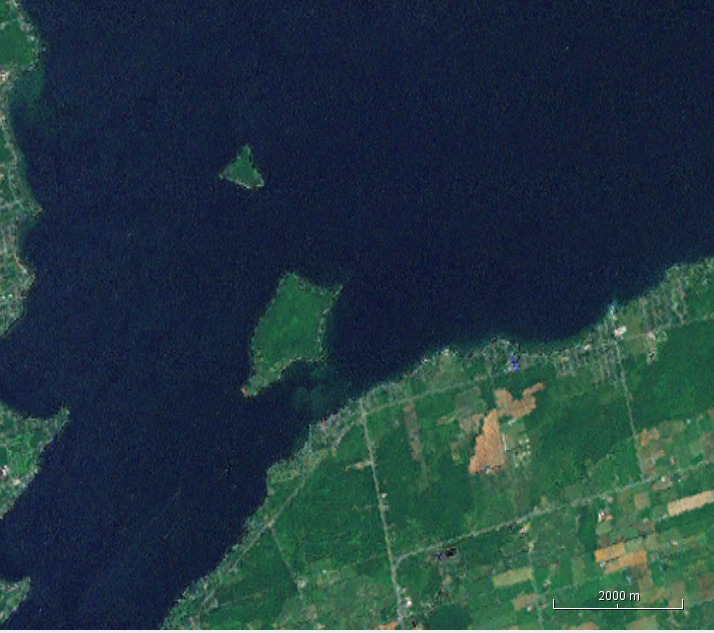
- Snake Island (the larger of the two islands seen) in Lake Simcoe
- Interactive map of Snake Island

Administration
- CAN
- Province: Ontario
- Region: York
- Municipality: Georgina

Snake Island is a lake island located in Lake Simcoe, Ontario, Canada. After the War of 1812, these islands, along with Fox Island and Georgina Island were purchased by Chief Joseph Snake (a member of the Chippewas of Georgina Island First Nation) from the British. The islands used to be headquarters to his father Chief Renatus Snake.

Like Georgina Island and Fox Island, Snake Island is inhabited by band members with homes located along the shores of the island. There are no roads and old dirt trails connecting the residents. The only means to reach the island is by private boats to docks in front of the homes. Winter travel is by snowmobile and ATV as the lake freezes over. The interior of the island is covered by trees.

From the 1940s until at least the mid 1970s, a girls' camp, Camp Centennial, occupied a large piece of property facing the mainland village of Island Grove. Vern and Marion Hickingbottom purchased the camp in the early 1950s from the founding owners, named Henderson, who remained in a cottage next to the camp for many years. Local first nations people from the Porte, Bigcanoe and McCue families worked at the camp and operated a popular tuck shop on the island; many participated in the annual Snake Island Regatta.

== Economy ==
Some homes on the island have been rented out as cottages during the summer months.

During the winter and when ice conditions permit, ice fishing is a popular activity. The commercial operators are based in Georgina, not from the island itself.
