= Regional Municipality of York =

York Region
- Regional municipality (upper-tier)
- Regional Municipality of York
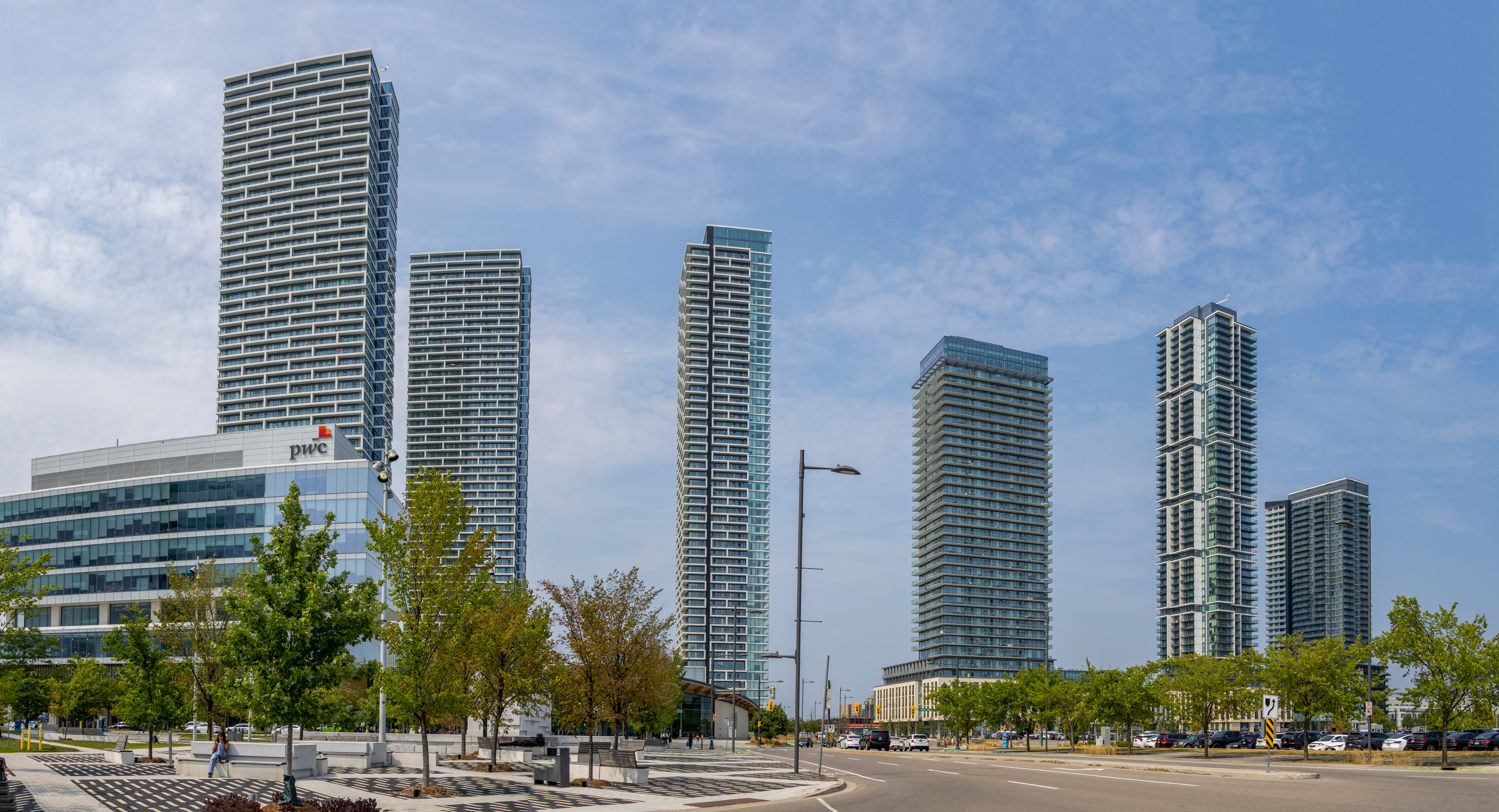
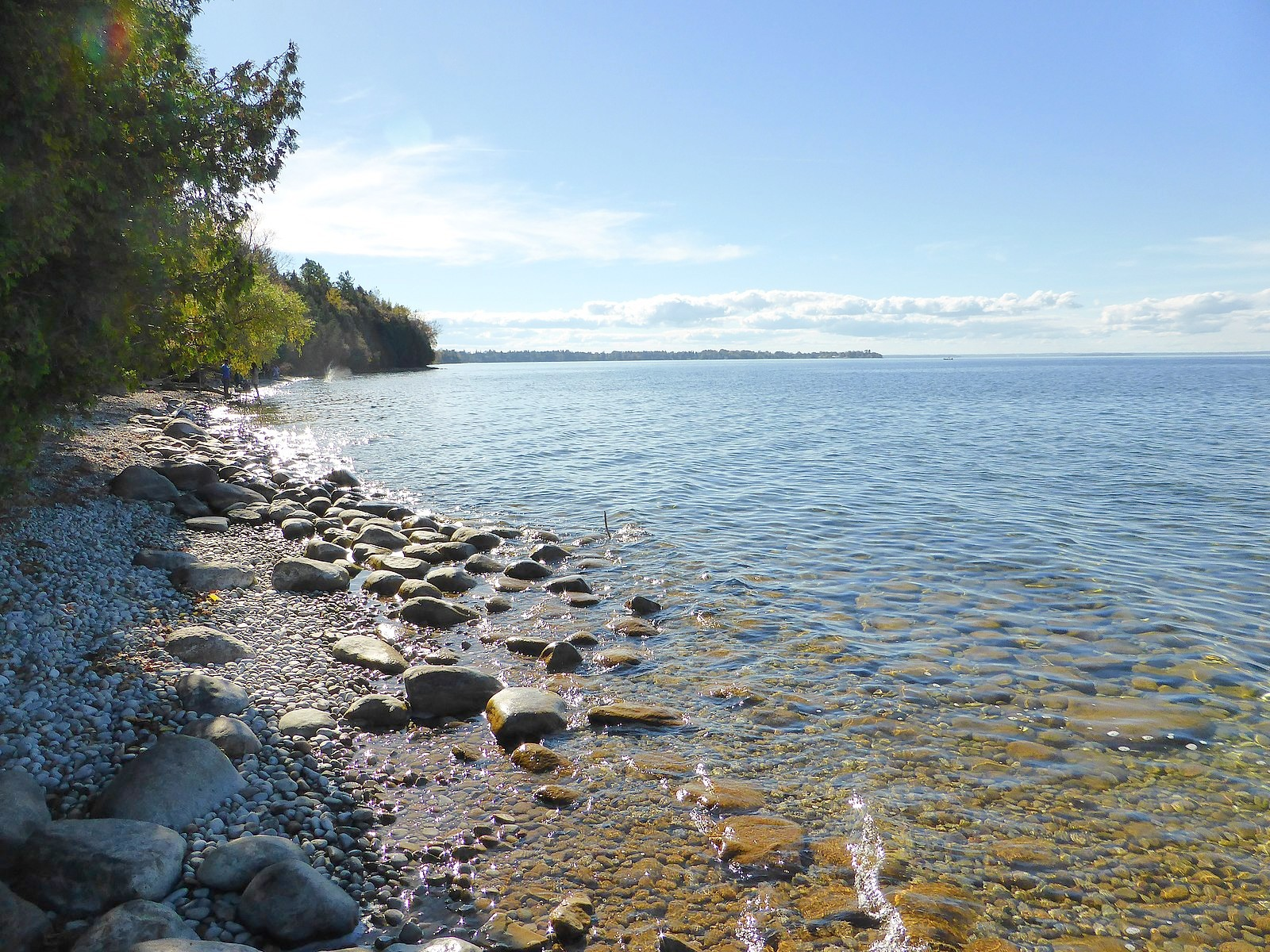
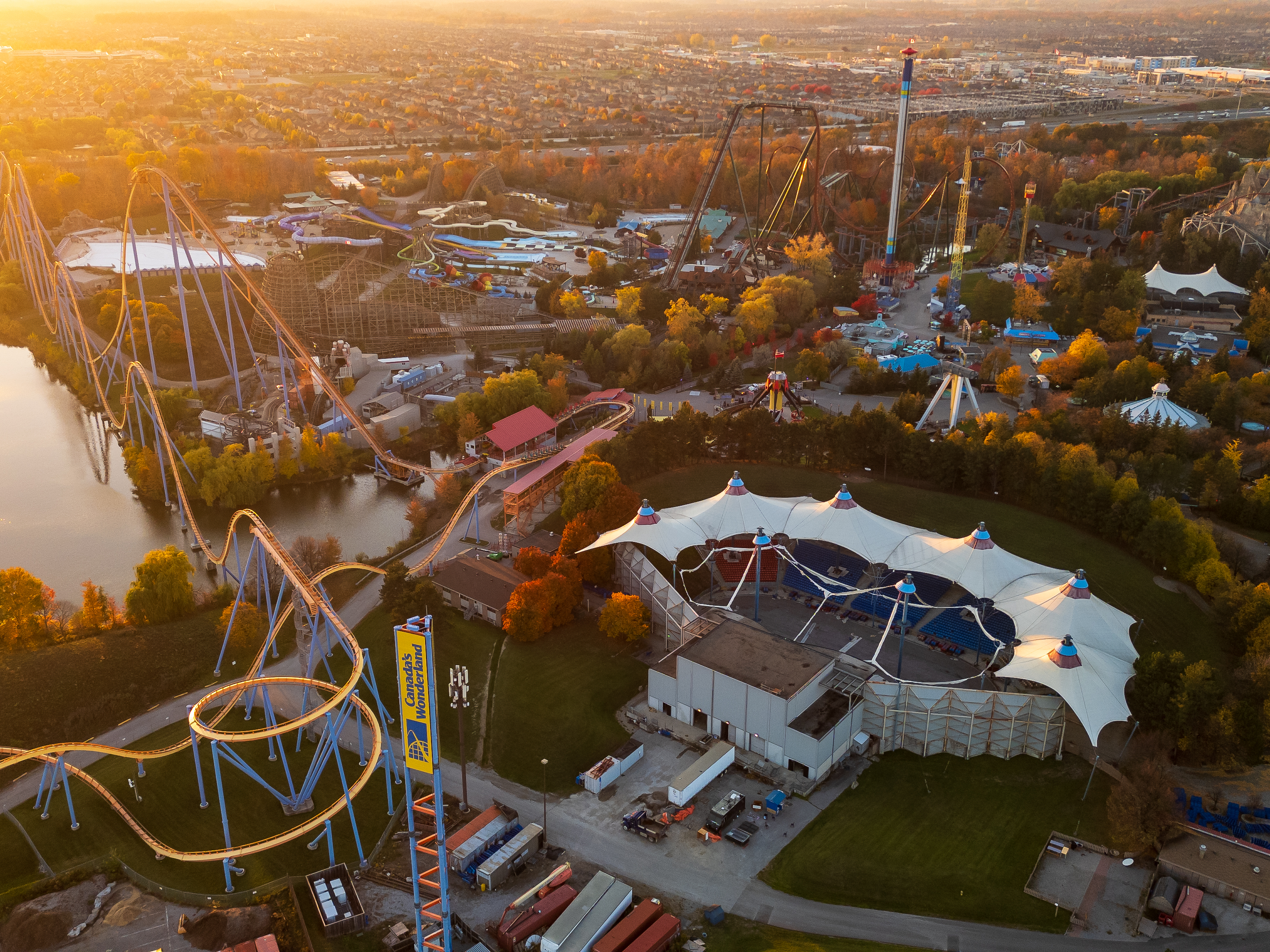
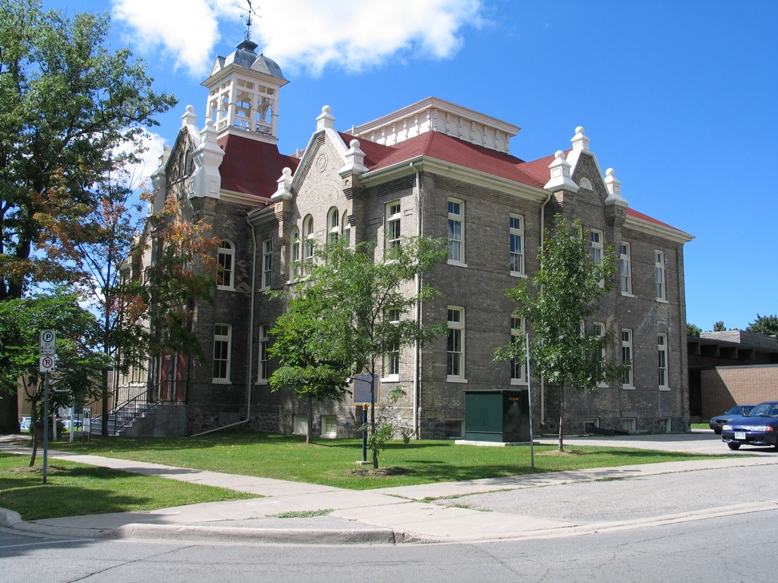
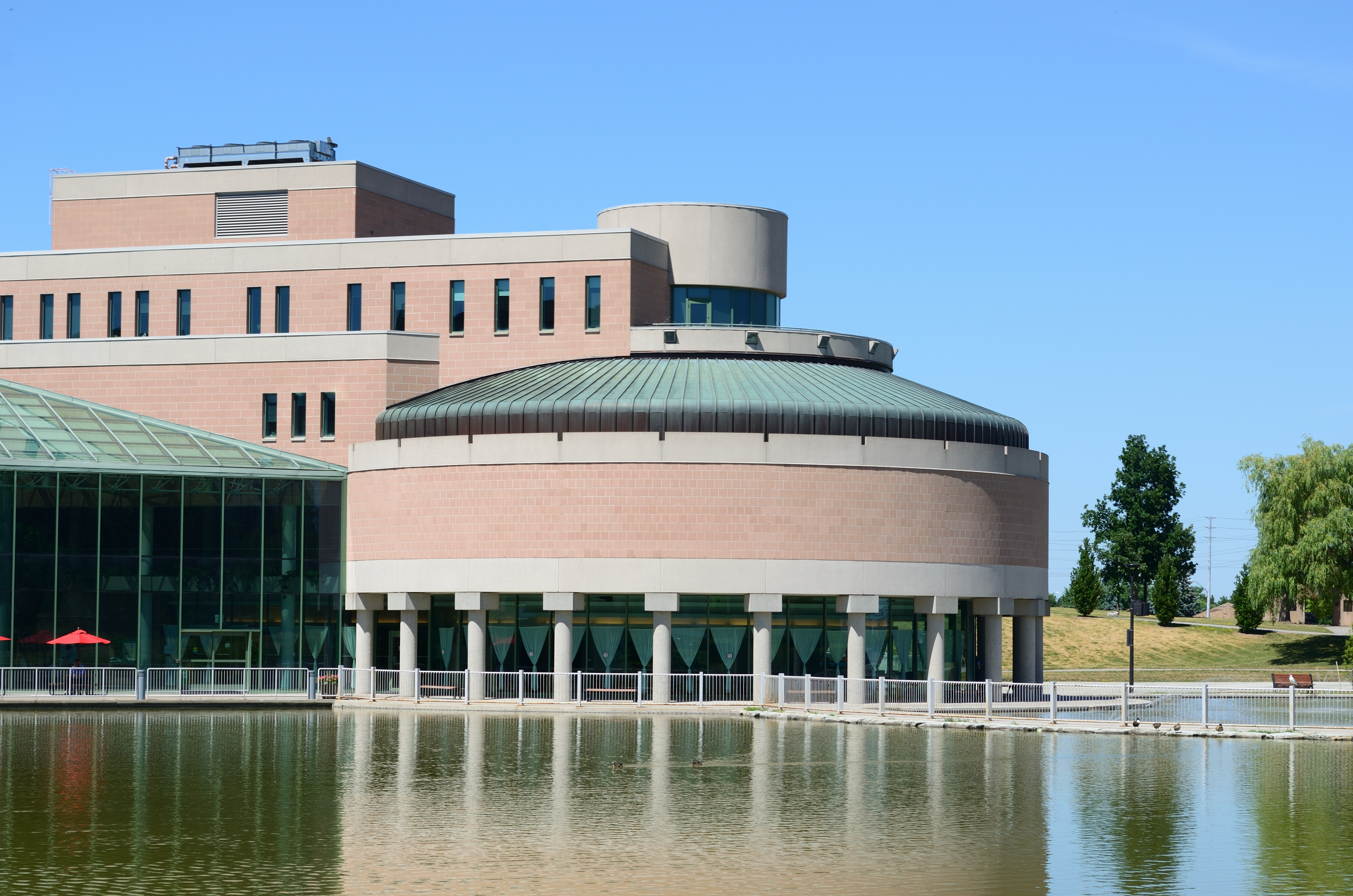
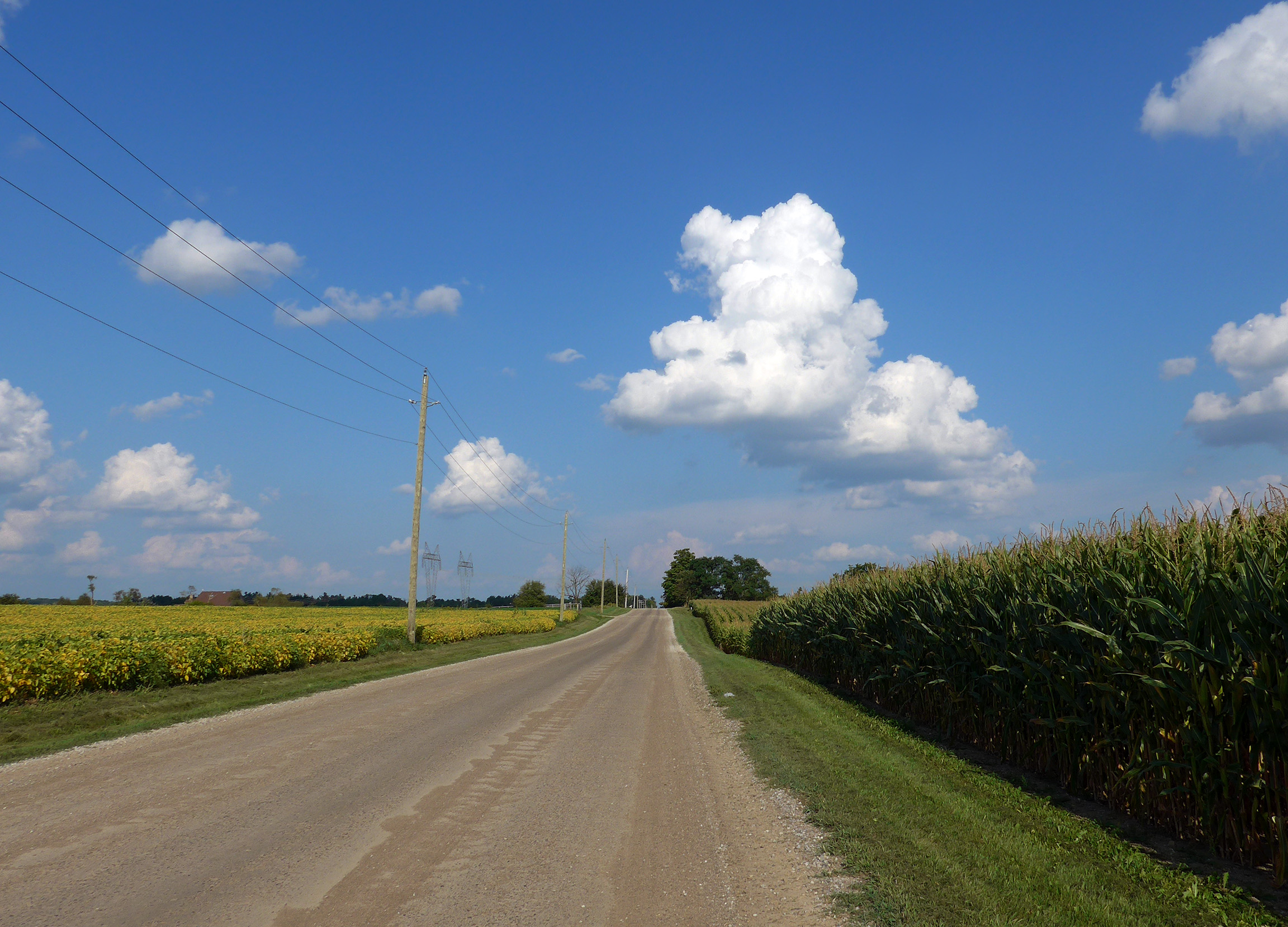
- Vaughan Metropolitan Centre Sibbald Point Provincial Park Canada's Wonderland Historic Aurora Markham Civic Centre Rural Nobleton

- Coat of arms Logo
- Motto: "Deeds Speak"

- Map showing York Region's location in Ontario
- Coordinates: 44°00′N 79°26′W
- Country: Canada
- Province: Ontario
- Established: 1792 (as York County)
- Incorporated: 1971 (as a Regional municipality)
- Seat: Newmarket

Government
  - Type: Council-CEO
  - Chair & CEO: Eric Jolliffe
  - Governing Body: York Regional Council

Area
  - Total: 1,758.27 km^{2} (678.87 sq mi)

Population (2021)
  - Total: 1,173,334
  - Density: 667.3/km^{2} (1,728/sq mi)
- Time zone: UTC-5 (Eastern (EST))
  - Summer (DST): UTC-4 (Eastern (EDT))
- Postal code prefix: L
- Website: www.york.ca

The Regional Municipality of York, also called York Region, is a regional municipality in Southern Ontario, Canada, between Lake Simcoe and Toronto. The region was established after the passing of then Bill 102, An Act to Establish The Regional Municipality of York, in 1970. It replaced the former York County in 1971, and is part of the Greater Toronto Area and the inner ring of the Golden Horseshoe. The regional government is headquartered in Newmarket.

As of the 2021 census, York Region's population was 1,173,334, with a growth rate of 5.7% from 2016. The Government of Ontario expects its population to surpass 1.5 million residents by 2031. The three largest cities in York Region are Markham, Vaughan and Richmond Hill.

== History ==
At a meeting in Richmond Hill on May 6, 1970, officials representing the municipalities of York County approved plans for the creation of a regional government entity to replace York County. The plan had been presented in 1969 by Darcy McKeough, the Ontario Minister of Municipal Affairs, taking about a year to determine municipal boundaries within the new regional government.

The Regional Municipality of York was created by Act of the Legislative Assembly of Ontario in 1970 (Bill 102 An Act to Establish The Regional Municipality of York), which took effect on January 1, 1971. The creation of the regional municipality resulted in the consolidation of the fourteen former municipalities of York County into nine new municipalities:

Creation of municipalities in the Regional Municipality of York (1971)
Municipality	Created from	Police villages dissolved
Town of Aurora	Town of Aurora, annexing portions of the Townships of King and Whitchurch	
Town of East Gwillimbury	Portion of the Township of East Gwillimbury	Holland Landing; Mount Albert; Queensville; Sharon
Town of Georgina	Townships of Georgina and North Gwillimbury, and the Village of Sutton	
Township of King	Portion of the Township of King	King City; Nobleton; Schomberg
City of Markham	Town of Markham, annexing portion of the Township of Markham	Thornhill (part); Unionville
Town of Newmarket	Town of Newmarket, annexing portions of the Townships of East Gwillimbury, King and Whitchurch	
City of Richmond Hill	City of Richmond Hill, annexing portions of the Townships of King, Markham, Vaughan and Whitchurch	
City of Vaughan	Village of Woodbridge, annexing portions of the Townships of King and Vaughan	Maple; Thornhill (part)
Town of Whitchurch–Stouffville	Village of Stouffville, annexing portions of the Townships of Markham (four lots south of Main Street) and Whitchurch	

The township of Whitchurch merged with the town of Stouffville to create the town of Whitchurch–Stouffville, ceding land to Aurora, Newmarket, and Richmond Hill to the west of the proposed Highway 404 and annexing a northern strip of land from the township of Markham. The western boundary of the new town of Markham was defined to be at Yonge Street, where its northern boundary was formed with Richmond Hill (to which it ceded land) and its western boundary with the new town Vaughan. The new town of Vaughan would consist of all communities in the area bounded by Markham and Richmond Hill in the east, Metro Toronto in the south, the periphery of the regional municipality in the west, and the new township of King in the north.

The townships of Georgina, North Gwillimbury, and Sutton were merged into the township of Georgina, and the East Gwillimbury neighbourhood of East Gwillimbury Heights was merged into Newmarket. King formed the northwestern part of the new region, but the eastern lot from Bathurst Street to Yonge Street was ceded to Newmarket, Aurora, and Oak Ridges, the last of which became a part of Richmond Hill. The boundary between Aurora and Newmarket was defined to be St. John's Sideroad, and Newmarket's northern boundary was defined to be Green Lane.

The towns of Aurora, Newmarket, and Richmond Hill were defined to be the growth centres for the regional municipality, which was to become a greenbelt between the denser urban areas of Toronto to the south and Barrie to the north. The growth centres were each restricted to grow to a maximum population of 25,000 by 2000, and the regional municipality to 300,000.

The municipal realignment merged 40% of East Gwillimbury's population into Newmarket. The council of East Gwillimbury voted to amalgamate with Newmarket, but Newmarket council opposed the amalgamation. In the plan presented by McKeough, the councils of the towns of Newmarket and Aurora were given ten years to decide whether or not to amalgamate.

The internal municipal realignments resulted in some politicians residing in a new municipality from that which they represented at the time of realignment. The reeve of Whitchurch Township resided in the western portion of the town that was annexed by Aurora, three East Gwillimbury councillors resided in land annexed by Newmarket, including its future mayor Ray Twinney, and King councillor Gordon Rowe was a resident of Oak Ridges, which became part of Richmond Hill.

=== Hydro Commissions ===
Because of the mix of urban and rural areas in the Region, the provision of electricity was governed in a different manner from the rest of the regional services:

- the hydro-electric commissions and public utilities commissions that existed at the end of 1970 continued to provide electricity within their respective areas;
- the councillors of the former Township of Vaughan and the trustees of the former Police Village of King City became members of new Hydro-Electric Commissions for their respective areas;
- Ontario Hydro continued to have responsibility for providing electricity to those portions of the Region that were not served by any of the above commissions.

Electric distribution was partially rationalized in 1978, when:

- hydro-electric commissions were established for all area municipalities except East Gwillimbury (but it could establish a commission later on, subject to Ontario Hydro's consent);
- effective January 1, 1979, all assets of the former commissions in the Region were transferred to the new commissions;
- Ontario Hydro withdrew its provision of services from all areas except those in East Gwillimbury, Georgina, King and Whitchurch-Stouffville;
- Georgina, King and Whitchurch-Stouffville could take over responsibility for such areas at a later date, subject to Ontario Hydro's consent

=== Police ===
The York Regional Police was also created at this time, amalgamating the fourteen town, township, and village police services. Policing on the Chippewas of Georgina Island First Nation is provided by the Georgina Island Police.

== Geography ==
York Region covers 1,762 square kilometres from Lake Simcoe in the north to the city of Toronto in the south. Its eastern border is shared with Durham Region, to the west is Peel Region, and Simcoe County is to the northwest. A detailed map of the region showing its major roads, communities and points of interest is available.

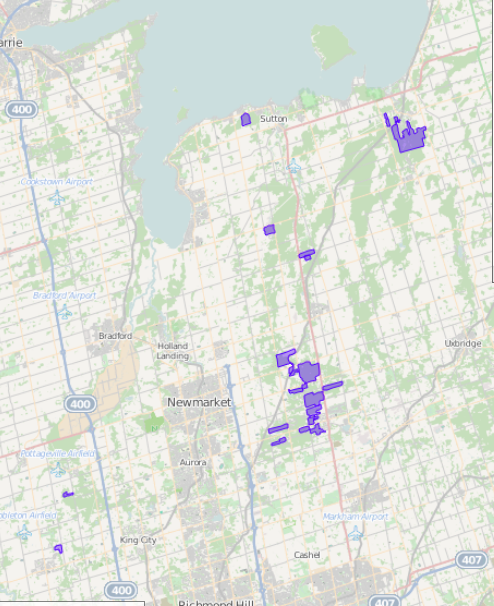
Map showing the Regional Forests in purple.

Towns and cities in York Region include:

- Town of Aurora
- Town of East Gwillimbury
- Town of Georgina
- Township of King
- City of Markham
- Town of Newmarket
- City of Richmond Hill
- City of Vaughan
- Town of Whitchurch–Stouffville

There is also one First Nation with an Indian reserve, where the Chippewas of Georgina Island First Nation reside on Georgina Island, Fox Island and Snake Island.

York Region's landscape includes farmlands, wetlands and kettle lakes, the Oak Ridges Moraine and over 2,070 hectares of regional forest, in addition to the built-up areas of its municipalities. The highest point in the region is within the rolling hills of the moraine near Dufferin St. & Aurora Side Road at 360m ASL (1,243 feet)

=== Climate ===
York Region is situated in the humid continental climate (Köppen Dfb) zone with warm summers and cold winters, ample snowfall, more in the northern part of York region much of it derived from the wind driven snowbelt streamer activity.

Climate data for Markham (Buttonville at Toronto Buttonville Airport) WMO ID: 71639; coordinates 43°51′44″N 79°22′12″W; elevation: 198.1 m (650 ft); 1991–2020 normals, extremes 1895–present (Note: Long term records have been recorded at various climate stations in or nearby Markham since 1895. From 1895 to 1908 at Toronto Agincourt, 1908 to 1918 at Aurora, 1918 to 1959 at Oak Ridges, 1959 to 1986 at Richmond Hill and 1986 to present at Toronto Buttonville Airport)
Month	Jan	Feb	Mar	Apr	May	Jun	Jul	Aug	Sep	Oct	Nov	Dec	Year
Record high humidex	16.0	18.0	29.2	35.7	41.0	46.0	50.9	47.4	44.2	38.0	25.8	20.6	50.9
Record high °C (°F)	14.9 (58.8)	17.3 (63.1)	26.3 (79.3)	31.7 (89.1)	34.6 (94.3)	36.6 (97.9)	40.0 (104.0)	37.8 (100.0)	35.6 (96.1)	31.0 (87.8)	23.8 (74.8)	20.0 (68.0)	40.0 (104.0)
Mean daily maximum °C (°F)	−1.7 (28.9)	−1.0 (30.2)	4.6 (40.3)	11.8 (53.2)	19.3 (66.7)	24.6 (76.3)	27.3 (81.1)	26.3 (79.3)	21.9 (71.4)	14.3 (57.7)	7.4 (45.3)	1.5 (34.7)	13.0 (55.4)
Daily mean °C (°F)	−6.0 (21.2)	−5.6 (21.9)	−0.2 (31.6)	6.5 (43.7)	13.4 (56.1)	18.8 (65.8)	21.5 (70.7)	20.6 (69.1)	16.2 (61.2)	9.4 (48.9)	3.3 (37.9)	−2.2 (28.0)	8.0 (46.4)
Mean daily minimum °C (°F)	−10.1 (13.8)	−10.1 (13.8)	−5.0 (23.0)	1.2 (34.2)	7.4 (45.3)	13.0 (55.4)	15.6 (60.1)	14.8 (58.6)	10.4 (50.7)	4.3 (39.7)	−0.8 (30.6)	−5.8 (21.6)	2.9 (37.2)
Record low °C (°F)	−35.2 (−31.4)	−34.4 (−29.9)	−26.1 (−15.0)	−15.6 (3.9)	−5.6 (21.9)	0.0 (32.0)	2.2 (36.0)	1.1 (34.0)	−3.3 (26.1)	−9.4 (15.1)	−20.6 (−5.1)	−33.9 (−29.0)	−35.2 (−31.4)
Record low wind chill	−42.6	−41.7	−35.6	−18.6	−7.9	0.0	0.0	0.0	−4.2	−8.8	−23.9	−36.6	−42.6
Average precipitation mm (inches)	63.5 (2.50)	51.1 (2.01)	52.3 (2.06)	78.9 (3.11)	80.0 (3.15)	86.7 (3.41)	85.2 (3.35)	71.9 (2.83)	83.1 (3.27)	70.6 (2.78)	76.7 (3.02)	62.5 (2.46)	862.4 (33.95)
Average rainfall mm (inches)	27.6 (1.09)	21.0 (0.83)	32.8 (1.29)	71.8 (2.83)	79.9 (3.15)	86.7 (3.41)	85.2 (3.35)	71.9 (2.83)	83.1 (3.27)	70.1 (2.76)	65.5 (2.58)	33.4 (1.31)	728.9 (28.70)
Average snowfall cm (inches)	40.3 (15.9)	33.9 (13.3)	19.7 (7.8)	7.2 (2.8)	0.1 (0.0)	0.0 (0.0)	0.0 (0.0)	0.0 (0.0)	0.0 (0.0)	0.6 (0.2)	11.7 (4.6)	32.8 (12.9)	146.4 (57.6)
Average precipitation days (≥ 0.2 mm)	17.0	13.1	12.0	12.6	12.3	11.6	11.2	10.0	10.5	13.3	14.3	15.5	153.5
Average rainy days (≥ 0.2 mm)	5.5	3.7	6.5	11.2	12.3	11.6	11.2	10.0	10.5	13.2	10.9	6.8	113.4
Average snowy days (≥ 0.2 cm)	14.2	11.0	7.2	2.8	0.13	0.0	0.0	0.0	0.0	0.42	4.8	10.6	51.1
Average relative humidity (%) (at 1500 LST)	68.3	63.5	57.7	52.9	52.8	53.9	52.9	55.2	57.6	62.1	66.8	70.4	59.5
Source: Environment and Climate Change Canada

Climate data for Richmond Hill Climate ID: 6157012; coordinates 43°52′38″N 79°26′52″W; elevation: 240 m (790 ft); 1981–2010 normals
Month	Jan	Feb	Mar	Apr	May	Jun	Jul	Aug	Sep	Oct	Nov	Dec	Year
Record high °C (°F)	14.5 (58.1)	14.5 (58.1)	25.5 (77.9)	31.0 (87.8)	34.5 (94.1)	35.0 (95.0)	37.0 (98.6)	37.0 (98.6)	34.4 (93.9)	29.4 (84.9)	23.3 (73.9)	20.0 (68.0)	37.0 (98.6)
Mean daily maximum °C (°F)	−2.2 (28.0)	−0.6 (30.9)	4.4 (39.9)	12.1 (53.8)	19.0 (66.2)	24.2 (75.6)	26.8 (80.2)	25.6 (78.1)	20.9 (69.6)	13.7 (56.7)	6.7 (44.1)	0.8 (33.4)	12.6 (54.7)
Daily mean °C (°F)	−6.2 (20.8)	−4.9 (23.2)	−0.3 (31.5)	6.9 (44.4)	13.3 (55.9)	18.7 (65.7)	21.4 (70.5)	20.3 (68.5)	15.9 (60.6)	9.1 (48.4)	3.1 (37.6)	−2.7 (27.1)	7.9 (46.2)
Mean daily minimum °C (°F)	−10.2 (13.6)	−9.1 (15.6)	−5 (23)	1.7 (35.1)	7.7 (45.9)	13.1 (55.6)	15.9 (60.6)	15.1 (59.2)	10.8 (51.4)	4.5 (40.1)	−0.5 (31.1)	−6.1 (21.0)	3.2 (37.8)
Record low °C (°F)	−32.5 (−26.5)	−29 (−20)	−27 (−17)	−15 (5)	−5.6 (21.9)	0.6 (33.1)	4.4 (39.9)	3.0 (37.4)	−3.3 (26.1)	−7.8 (18.0)	−15.5 (4.1)	−30 (−22)	−32.5 (−26.5)
Average precipitation mm (inches)	62.3 (2.45)	58.0 (2.28)	58.8 (2.31)	70.1 (2.76)	81.6 (3.21)	80.2 (3.16)	83.5 (3.29)	89.2 (3.51)	88.4 (3.48)	69.1 (2.72)	87.2 (3.43)	66.8 (2.63)	895.2 (35.24)
Average rainfall mm (inches)	25.2 (0.99)	26.3 (1.04)	33.6 (1.32)	62.5 (2.46)	81.5 (3.21)	80.2 (3.16)	83.5 (3.29)	89.2 (3.51)	88.4 (3.48)	67.6 (2.66)	73.5 (2.89)	33.1 (1.30)	744.6 (29.31)
Average snowfall cm (inches)	37.1 (14.6)	31.7 (12.5)	25.2 (9.9)	7.6 (3.0)	0.1 (0.0)	0.0 (0.0)	0.0 (0.0)	0.0 (0.0)	0.0 (0.0)	1.5 (0.6)	13.7 (5.4)	33.7 (13.3)	150.6 (59.3)
Average precipitation days (≥ 0.2 mm)	18.3	13.9	14.4	13.6	13.6	11.9	11.3	11.2	12.4	13.4	15.2	16.2	165.2
Average rainy days (≥ 0.2 mm)	4.9	4.3	7.4	11.7	13.6	11.9	11.3	11.2	12.4	13.3	11.4	7.0	120.2
Average snowy days (≥ 0.2 cm)	15.3	11.3	9.0	3.2	0.12	0.0	0.0	0.0	0.0	0.62	5.3	11.6	56.5
Source: Environment and Climate Change Canada

Climate data for Stouffville Climate ID: 6158084; coordinates 43°58′N 79°15′W; elevation: 266.7 m (875 ft), 1971–2000 normals, extremes 1971–1993
Month	Jan	Feb	Mar	Apr	May	Jun	Jul	Aug	Sep	Oct	Nov	Dec	Year
Record high °C (°F)	11.0 (51.8)	13.5 (56.3)	23.0 (73.4)	30.5 (86.9)	32.0 (89.6)	34.0 (93.2)	35.5 (95.9)	36.5 (97.7)	32.8 (91.0)	25.5 (77.9)	22.8 (73.0)	18.0 (64.4)	36.5 (97.7)
Mean daily maximum °C (°F)	−3.2 (26.2)	−2.4 (27.7)	3.1 (37.6)	11.1 (52.0)	18.5 (65.3)	23.1 (73.6)	26.2 (79.2)	24.7 (76.5)	19.9 (67.8)	12.8 (55.0)	6.0 (42.8)	−0.6 (30.9)	11.6 (52.9)
Mean daily minimum °C (°F)	−11.6 (11.1)	−10.9 (12.4)	−5.7 (21.7)	1.2 (34.2)	7.4 (45.3)	11.8 (53.2)	14.8 (58.6)	14 (57)	9.6 (49.3)	3.5 (38.3)	−1.0 (30.2)	−7.7 (18.1)	2.1 (35.8)
Record low °C (°F)	−35.5 (−31.9)	−28.3 (−18.9)	−28.0 (−18.4)	−17.0 (1.4)	−3.3 (26.1)	0.0 (32.0)	7.0 (44.6)	2.5 (36.5)	−2.0 (28.4)	−7.2 (19.0)	−15.0 (5.0)	−31.5 (−24.7)	−35.5 (−31.9)
Average precipitation mm (inches)	52.8 (2.08)	53.5 (2.11)	62.8 (2.47)	65.5 (2.58)	81.2 (3.20)	73.3 (2.89)	75.8 (2.98)	99.3 (3.91)	79.2 (3.12)	81.2 (3.20)	78.5 (3.09)	65.6 (2.58)	868.6 (34.20)
Average rainfall mm (inches)	17.9 (0.70)	23.3 (0.92)	43.5 (1.71)	60.5 (2.38)	81.1 (3.19)	73.3 (2.89)	75.8 (2.98)	99.3 (3.91)	79.2 (3.12)	80.6 (3.17)	70.3 (2.77)	33.0 (1.30)	737.7 (29.04)
Average snowfall cm (inches)	34.9 (13.7)	30.2 (11.9)	19.3 (7.6)	5.0 (2.0)	0.1 (0.0)	0.0 (0.0)	0.0 (0.0)	0.0 (0.0)	0.0 (0.0)	0.6 (0.2)	8.2 (3.2)	32.7 (12.9)	131.0 (51.6)
Average precipitation days (≥ 0.2 mm)	11.0	10.3	10.1	10.8	11.0	10.7	9.2	10.8	10.4	13.0	12.6	12.3	131.9
Average rainy days (≥ 0.2 mm)	2.9	3.1	6.2	9.8	11.0	10.7	9.2	10.8	10.4	13.0	10.7	5.1	102.6
Average snowy days (≥ 0.2 cm)	8.4	7.7	4.7	1.2	0.1	0.0	0.0	0.0	0.0	0.2	2.6	8.3	33.1
Source: Environment and Climate Change Canada

Climate data for Woodbridge (Vaughan) Climate ID: 6159575; coordinates 43°47′N 79°36′W; elevation: 164 m (538 ft); 1981–2010 normals, 1948–2005
Month	Jan	Feb	Mar	Apr	May	Jun	Jul	Aug	Sep	Oct	Nov	Dec	Year
Record high °C (°F)	17.0 (62.6)	15.5 (59.9)	26.5 (79.7)	31.5 (88.7)	33.0 (91.4)	36.0 (96.8)	39.0 (102.2)	37.2 (99.0)	36.1 (97.0)	30.6 (87.1)	25.0 (77.0)	19.5 (67.1)	39.0 (102.2)
Mean daily maximum °C (°F)	−2.5 (27.5)	−0.5 (31.1)	4.3 (39.7)	12.0 (53.6)	18.8 (65.8)	24.1 (75.4)	26.9 (80.4)	25.4 (77.7)	20.9 (69.6)	13.9 (57.0)	6.9 (44.4)	0.8 (33.4)	12.6 (54.7)
Daily mean °C (°F)	−6.6 (20.1)	−4.8 (23.4)	−0.4 (31.3)	6.6 (43.9)	12.9 (55.2)	18.1 (64.6)	20.8 (69.4)	19.6 (67.3)	15.4 (59.7)	9.0 (48.2)	3.1 (37.6)	−2.8 (27.0)	7.6 (45.7)
Mean daily minimum °C (°F)	−10.7 (12.7)	−9.2 (15.4)	−5.2 (22.6)	1.2 (34.2)	6.8 (44.2)	12.0 (53.6)	14.7 (58.5)	13.8 (56.8)	9.8 (49.6)	4.0 (39.2)	−0.8 (30.6)	−6.4 (20.5)	2.5 (36.5)
Record low °C (°F)	−34.5 (−30.1)	−30.0 (−22.0)	−29.4 (−20.9)	−17.2 (1.0)	−6.7 (19.9)	−1.7 (28.9)	2.8 (37.0)	−0.6 (30.9)	−5.0 (23.0)	−11.7 (10.9)	−18.3 (−0.9)	−30.0 (−22.0)	−34.5 (−30.1)
Average precipitation mm (inches)	50.3 (1.98)	44.2 (1.74)	49.2 (1.94)	63.3 (2.49)	79.1 (3.11)	76.3 (3.00)	70.4 (2.77)	80.4 (3.17)	84.6 (3.33)	66.5 (2.62)	78.3 (3.08)	57.4 (2.26)	799.8 (31.49)
Average rainfall mm (inches)	20.4 (0.80)	23.2 (0.91)	31.4 (1.24)	59.6 (2.35)	79.1 (3.11)	76.3 (3.00)	70.4 (2.77)	80.4 (3.17)	84.6 (3.33)	66.0 (2.60)	71.1 (2.80)	34.6 (1.36)	697.0 (27.44)
Average snowfall cm (inches)	29.9 (11.8)	21.1 (8.3)	17.8 (7.0)	3.7 (1.5)	0.0 (0.0)	0.0 (0.0)	0.0 (0.0)	0.0 (0.0)	0.0 (0.0)	0.45 (0.18)	7.2 (2.8)	22.8 (9.0)	102.8 (40.5)
Average precipitation days (≥ 0.2 mm)	13.5	10.3	10.7	11.8	12.0	10.8	9.5	9.6	10.6	12.7	13.1	12.8	137.4
Average rainy days (≥ 0.2 mm)	4.2	4.4	6.4	10.7	12.0	10.8	9.5	9.6	10.6	12.6	11.1	6.5	108.3
Average snowy days (≥ 0.2 cm)	10.2	6.8	5.1	1.5	0.0	0.0	0.0	0.0	0.0	0.23	3.0	7.5	34.3
Source: Environment and Climate Change Canada

== Government ==
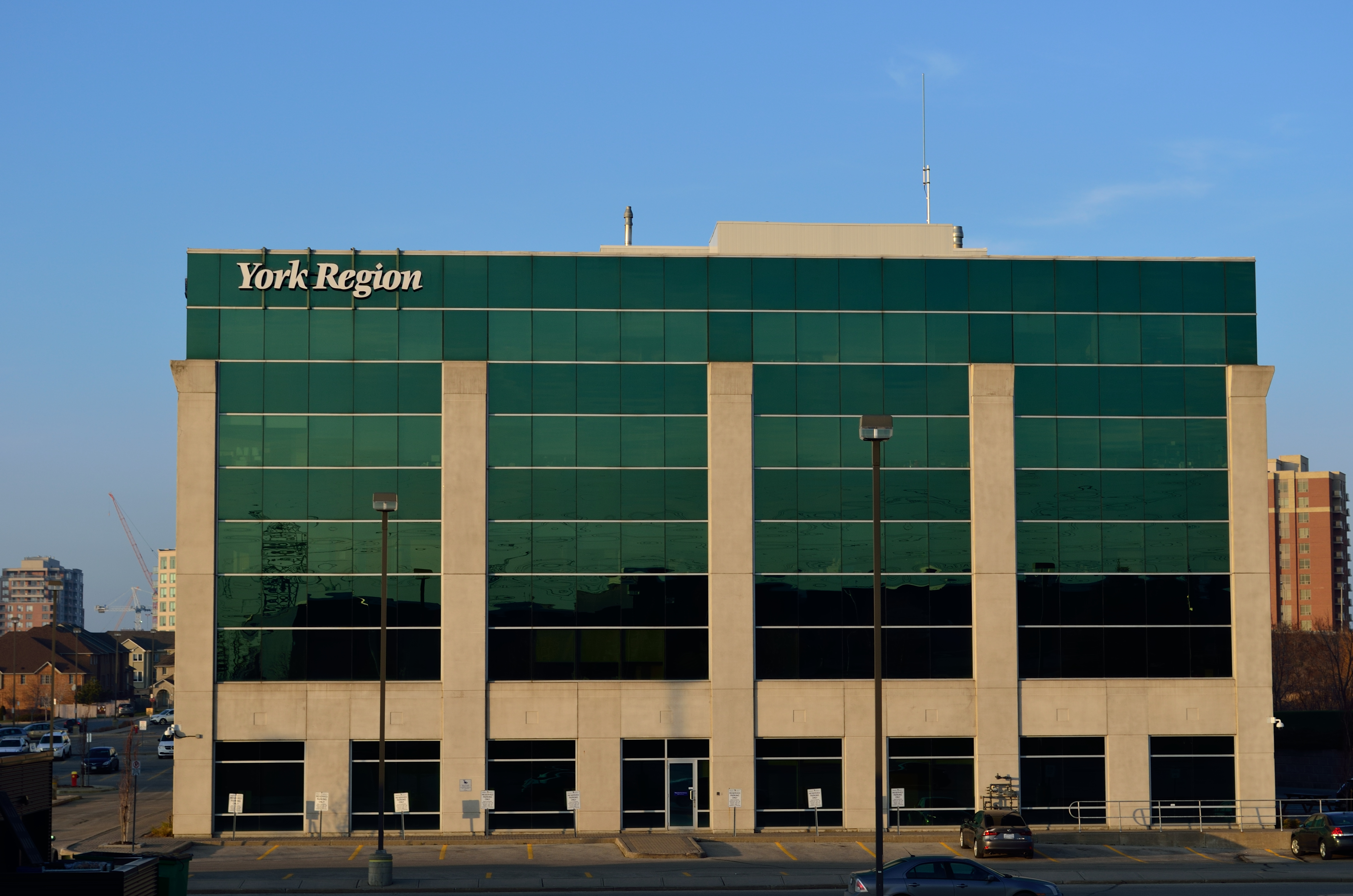
York Region Richmond Hill Office at Yonge & Hwy 7

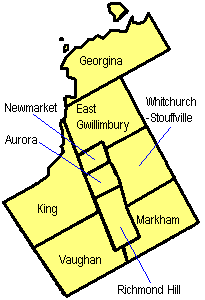
Map of York Region and the municipalities it includes.

The region is governed by York Regional Council, which consists of 20 elected representatives from each of the constituent towns and cities in the region. These include each of the nine mayors, and 11 regional councillors who are elected from the constituent municipalities as follows:

- 1 from Georgina
- 1 from Newmarket
- 2 from Richmond Hill
- 3 from Vaughan
- 4 from Markham

The regional councilors are elected at-large for each lower-tier municipality which has them. They are also voting members of their respective city/town council.

The leader of Council is referred to as "Regional Chair and CEO". Wayne Emmerson, a former mayor of Whitchurch-Stouffville, was elected to this office in December 2014 and served until retiring in 2024. Eric Jolliffe was appointed as the new Chair shortly afterwards and took office on January 1, 2025.

In October 2008, York Regional Municipality was named one of Greater Toronto's Top Employers by Mediacorp Canada Inc.

=== Federal and provincial representation ===
Starting with the 2025 federal election, York Region encompasses all or part of the federal electoral districts of Aurora—Oak Ridges—Richmond Hill, King-Vaughan, Markham—Stouffville, Markham—Thornhill, Markham—Unionville, Newmarket—Aurora, Richmond Hill South, Thornhill, Vaughan—Woodbridge, and York—Durham.

Provincially, York Region is represented in the Legislative Assembly of Ontario by Members of Provincial Parliament, encompassing all or part of the provincial electoral districts of Aurora—Oak Ridges—Richmond Hill, King-Vaughan, Markham—Stouffville, Markham—Thornhill, Markham—Unionville, Newmarket—Aurora, Richmond Hill, Thornhill, Vaughan—Woodbridge, and York—Simcoe.

=== Proposed reformations ===
In May 2023, Premier Doug Ford announced that he would look to dissolve and restructure existing regional municipalities where deemed prudent. In response, Markham mayor Frank Scarpitti publicly proposed amalgamating York Region into a single-tier municipality, claiming it would save millions of dollars. The idea was met with immediate disapproval from all other York Region mayors, excluding Vaughan Mayor Steven Del Duca, who had not publicly expressed an opinion at the time. Scarpitti was criticized for not consulting with the other mayors about his proposal before publicly announcing it, which the others mayors saw as dramatic. Ford later announced that he had no interest in Scarpitti's proposal to amalgamate, and that any future proposals which were to be seriously considered must be deliberated among all of the other mayors in a region before being made public.

Later, Vaughan mayor Steven Del Duca proposed dissolving York Region and making all of its lower-tier municipalities independent, claiming that Vaughan contributed more tax dollars than it received in regional funding. No other politicians endorsed Del Duca's proposal. The mayors and councilors of York Region have generally agreed with looking into potential reforms to streamline government operations. However, the mayors of the smaller towns, such as Newmarket and Whitchurch-Stouffville, strongly urged for dialogue and diplomacy, stressing that no municipality should be left behind as a result of a restructuring.

As of January 2025, the Ontario government has not made any indication as to whether York Region will be restructured or remain as-is.

== Demographics ==
As a census division in the 2021 Census of Population conducted by Statistics Canada, the Regional Municipality of York had a population of 1,173,334 living in 391,034 of its 405,863 total private dwellings, a change of 5.7% from its 2016 population of 1,109,909. With a land area of 1,758.27 km^{2} (678.87 sq mi), it had a population density of 667.3/km^{2} (1,728.4/sq mi) in 2021. York is the third-largest census division in Ontario, following Toronto and Peel Region, and seventh-largest in Canada.

Historical census populations

Year	Pop.	±%
1976	203,915	—
1981	252,053	+23.6%
1986	350,602	+39.1%
1991	504,981	+44.0%
1996	592,445	+17.3%

Year	Pop.	±%
2001	729,254	+23.1%
2006	892,712	+22.4%
2011	1,032,524	+15.7%
2016	1,109,909	+7.5%
2021	1,173,334	+5.7%

Population by municipality (1986–2001)
Municipality	Status	Population (1986)	Population (1991)	Population (1996)	Population (2001)
Aurora	Town	20,905	29,454	34,857	40,167
East Gwillimbury	Town	14,644	18,367	19,770	20,555
Georgina	Town	22,486	29,746	34,777	39,263
King	Township	15,951	18,121	18,223	18,533
Markham	City	114,597	153,811	173,383	208,615
Newmarket	Town	34,923	45,474	57,125	65,788
Richmond Hill	City	46,766	80,142	101,725	132,030
Vaughan	City	65,058	111,359	132,549	182,022
Whitchurch–Stouffville	Town	15,135	18,357	19,835	22,008
York (total)	Regional Municipality	350,602	504,981	592,445	729,254

Population by municipality (2006–2021)
Municipality	Status	Population (2006)	Population (2011)	Population (2016)	Population (2021)
Aurora	Town	47,629	53,203	55,445	62,057
East Gwillimbury	Town	21,069	22,473	23,991	34,637
Georgina	Town	42,346	43,517	45,418	47,642
King	Township	19,487	19,899	24,512	27,333
Markham	City	261,573	301,709	328,966	338,503
Newmarket	Town	74,295	79,978	84,224	87,942
Richmond Hill	City	162,704	185,541	195,022	202,022
Vaughan	City	238,866	288,301	306,233	323,103
Whitchurch–Stouffville	Town	24,390	37,628	45,837	49,864
York (total)	Regional Municipality	892,712	1,032,524	1,109,909	1,173,334

=== Language ===
In the 2021 Canadian census, English is the mother tongue of 45.5% of the residents of York Region. Cantonese is the mother tongue for 9.7% of the population, followed by Mandarin (8.7%), Italian (4.0%), Farsi (4.4%) and Russian (3.1%).

=== Ethnicity ===
As of 2021, the most common ethnic groups are Chinese (22.6%), Italian (12.5%) and English (7.4%).

Largest ethnic origin in York Region by census tract based on the 2021 census

Ethnic origin (2021)	Population	Percentage
Chinese	263,900	22.6
Italian	145,695	12.5
English	86,435	7.4
Canadian	75,990	6.5
Irish	66,465	5.7
Scottish	65,430	5.6
East Indian	57,990	5.0
Iranian	43,545	3.7
Jewish	38,670	3.3
Russian	36,780	3.2
German	32,175	2.8
Filipino	28,590	2.5
French	27,845	2.4
Polish	24,470	2.1
Ukrainian	21,095	1.8

Visible and non-visible minority populations by group
Group	2021 census	
Group	Total	%
Visible minority	641,195	55%
South Asian	127,960	11%
Chinese (East Asian)	287,320	24.6%
Black	32,845	2.8%
Filipino	27,730	2.4%
Arab	14,010	1.2%
Latin American	17,285	1.5%
Southeast Asian (except Filipino)	15,390	1.3%
West Asian	62,310	5.3%
Korean (East Asian)	19,965	1.7%
Japanese (East Asian)	2,390	0.2%
Multiple visible minorities	23,345	2%
Visible minority, n.i.e.	10,640	0.9%
Not a visible minority	524,420	45%
Indigenous (see breakdown below)	5,875	0.5%
European (Note: Statistic includes all persons that did not make up part of a visible minority or an aboriginal identity.)	518,545	44.5%
Total population in private households	1,165,615	100%

Panethnic groups in the Regional Municipality of York (2001−2021)
Panethnic group	2021		2016		2011		2006		2001	
Panethnic group	Pop.	%	Pop.	%	Pop.	%	Pop.	%	Pop.	%
European (Note: Statistic includes all persons that did not make up part of a visible minority or an indigenous identity.)	518,545	44.49%	553,835	50.31%	576,820	56.32%	553,795	62.41%	506,975	69.86%
East Asian (Note: Statistic includes total responses of "Chinese", "Korean", and "Japanese" under visible minority section on census.)	309,675	26.57%	264,030	23.98%	197,850	19.32%	151,795	17.11%	108,515	14.95%
South Asian	127,960	10.98%	116,695	10.6%	107,955	10.54%	80,595	9.08%	47,345	6.52%
Middle Eastern (Note: Statistic includes total responses of "West Asian" and "Arab" under visible minority section on census.)	76,320	6.55%	54,840	4.98%	40,980	4%	28,260	3.18%	13,485	1.86%
Southeast Asian (Note: Statistic includes total responses of "Filipino" and "Southeast Asian" under visible minority section on census.)	43,120	3.7%	39,920	3.63%	40,500	3.95%	27,260	3.07%	15,545	2.14%
African	32,845	2.82%	27,775	2.52%	25,870	2.53%	20,770	2.34%	16,150	2.23%
Latin American	17,285	1.48%	13,650	1.24%	11,450	1.12%	8,560	0.96%	4,720	0.65%
Indigenous	5,875	0.5%	5,915	0.54%	4,560	0.45%	3,595	0.41%	2,560	0.35%
Other (Note: Statistic includes total responses of "Visible minority, n.i.e." and "Multiple visible minorities" under visible minority section on census.)	33,985	2.92%	24,295	2.21%	18,240	1.78%	12,715	1.43%	10,360	1.43%
Total responses	1,165,615	99.34%	1,100,950	99.19%	1,024,225	99.2%	887,345	99.4%	725,670	99.51%
Total population	1,173,334	100%	1,109,909	100%	1,032,524	100%	892,712	100%	729,254	100%
Note: Totals greater than 100% due to multiple origin responses

=== Religion ===
According to the 2021 census, the most reported religion among the population was Christianity (45.3%), with Catholicism (25.2%) making up the largest denomination. This was followed by Islam (7.8%), Judaism (5.2%), Hinduism (5.0%), Buddhism (2.6%) and Sikhism (1.0%). 32.5% of the population did not identify with a particular religion.

== Economy ==
The economy of York Region is diverse. In general, the economy includes a full range of businesses from industrial to high-tech to rural/agricultural. New developments tend to be focused along the Yonge Street corridor from Vaughan/Richmond Hill in the south to Newmarket/Aurora in the north. There are ongoing conflicts between conservationists and developers over land use, with the most contentious being over the use of the Oak Ridges Moraine.

== Attractions ==
York Region has an assortment of points of interest, ranging from nature reserves to pioneer-era museums, to a modern amusement park.

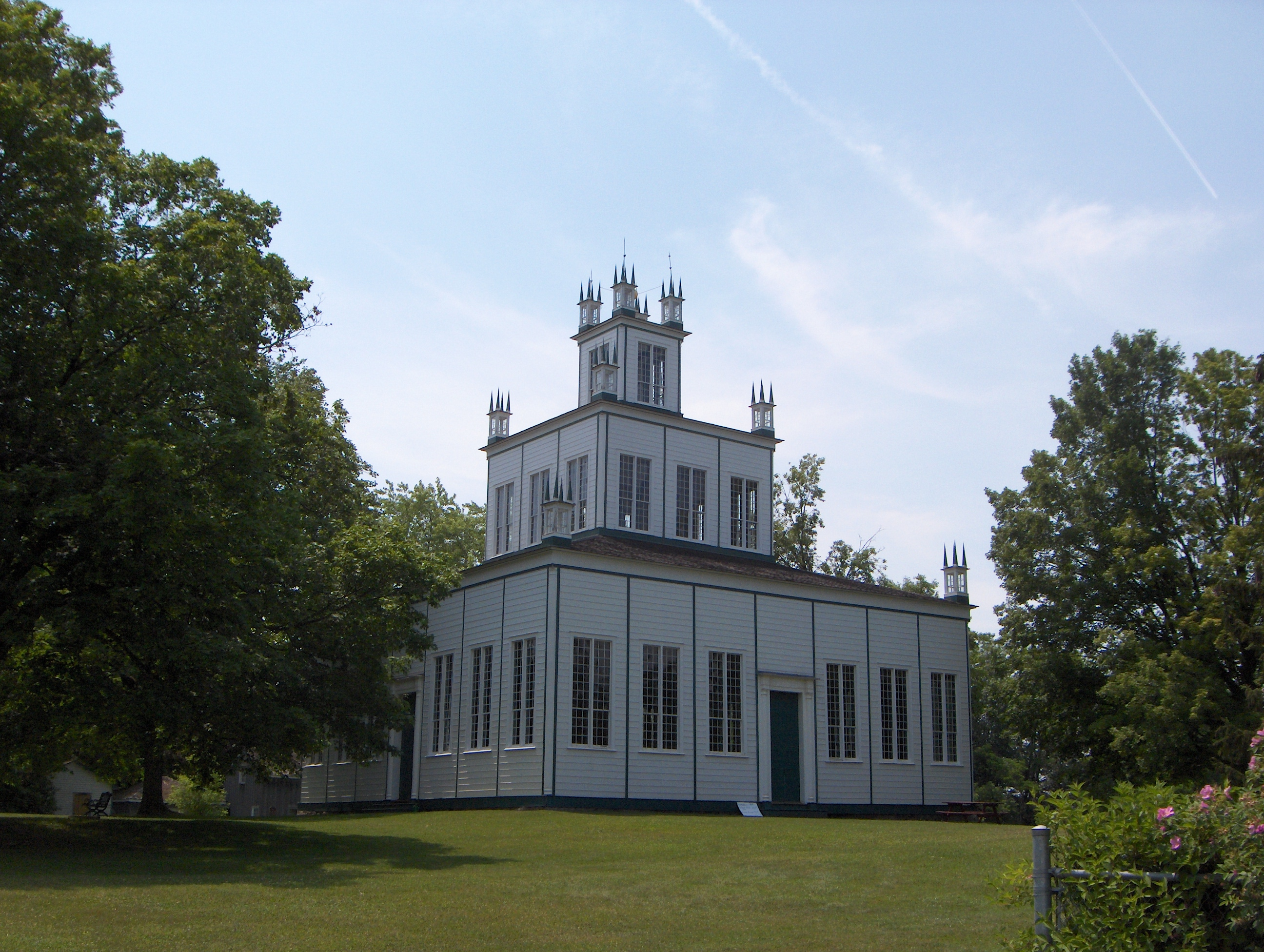
Sharon Temple in Sharon

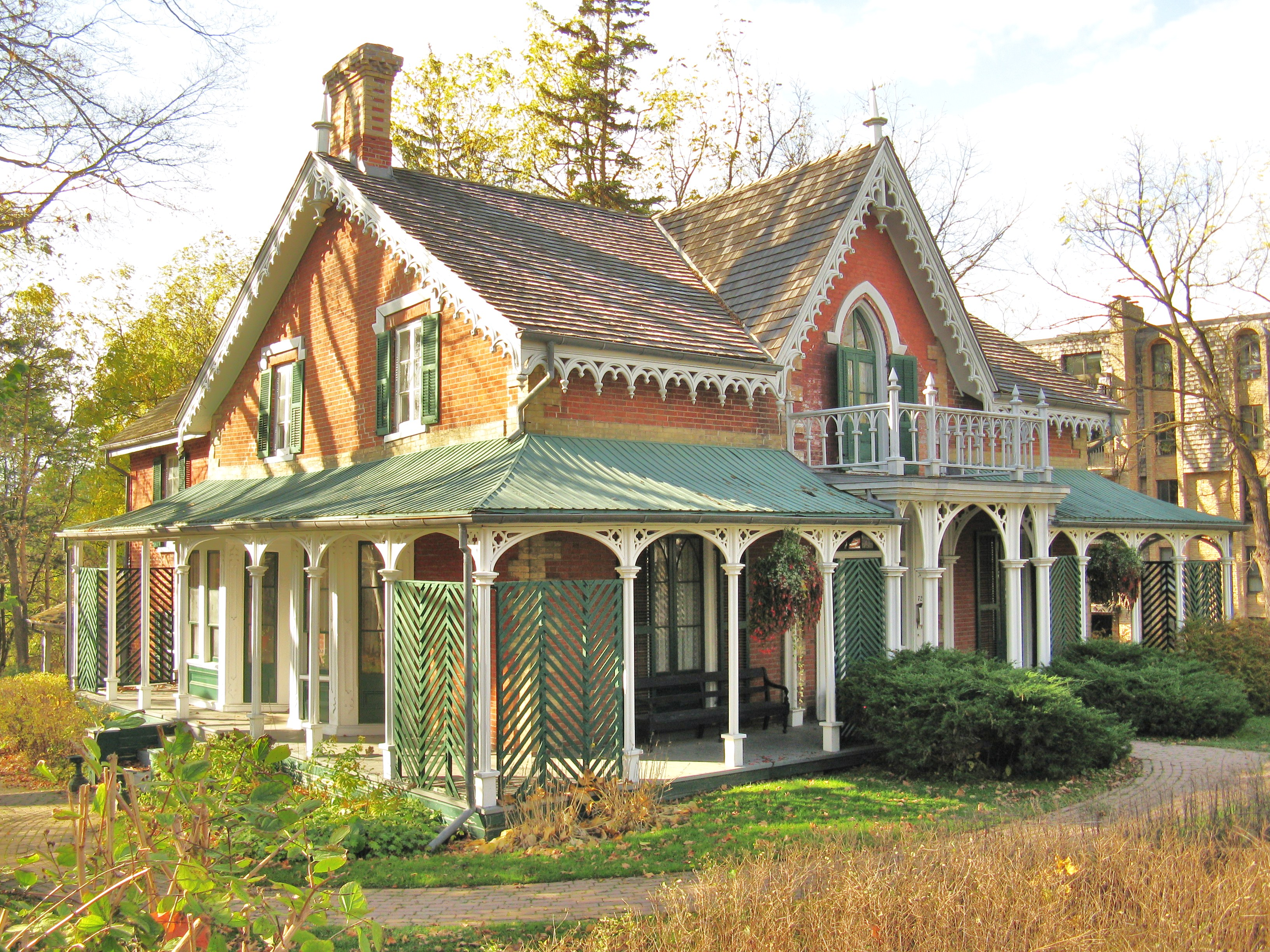
Hillary House National Historic Site, Aurora

Vaughan's major attractions include the McMichael Canadian Art Collection, in the community of Kleinburg, that features works by Canadian artists including Inuit and First Nations artists. Canada's Wonderland, which features roller coasters and other rides, concerts and fireworks shows, is also in Vaughan.

Heritage sites and historical museums in the Region include:

- Hillary House National Historic Site (Aurora)
- Historic Main Street Newmarket (Newmarket)
- Georgina Military Museum (Georgina)
- Georgina Village Museum (Georgina)
- King Township Museum (King)
- Markham Museum (Markham)
- RHLS Narrow Gauge Railway (Whitchurch–Stouffville)
- Sharon Temple National Historic Site (East Gwillimbury)
- Whitchurch-Stouffville Museum (Whitchurch–Stouffville)
- York-Durham Heritage Railway (Whitchurch–Stouffville)

Following is a sample of other attractions in the area:

- Applewood Farm Winery (Whitchurch–Stouffville)
- Canadian Heritage Humber River
- Fred Varley Art Gallery (Markham)
- Canada's Wonderland (Vaughan)
- Oak Ridges Trail
- Puck's Farm (King)
- Richmond Hill Centre for the Performing Arts
- Sutton-Zephyr Trail
- Willow Springs Winery (Whitchurch–Stouffville)
- Words Alive Literary Festival (East Gwillimbury)
- Bare Oaks Family Naturist Park (East Gwillimbury)
- York Demonstration Forest (Whitchurch–Stouffville)

== Health care ==
There are currently four hospitals within the Regional Municipality of York, including:

- Cortellucci Vaughan Hospital,
- Markham Stouffville Hospital,
- Mackenzie Richmond Hill Hospital, and;
- Southlake Regional Health Centre.

All four hospitals are part of the Local Health Integration Network (LHIN) Hospital Partnerships.

Boomerang Health, in Vaughan, is a centre that provides multidisciplinary rehabilitation and medical services geared specifically for children and adolescents, in collaboration with The Hospital for Sick Children.

Counselling Services for York Region, is a centre located in Vaughan that provides mental health services to individuals who are in need of psychological treatment and assessment. Counselling Services for York Region helped lobby for the Ontario Structured Psychotherapy Program which was successfully implemented by Ontario Health. The program was advocated through Advocacy York Region.

== Transportation ==
The arterial road network in York Region is a grid, with most roads running north–south or east–west. This was done under the leadership of British surveyor Augustus Jones during the 1790s. York Region assigned approximately 50 roads as York Regional Roads, meaning that maintenance of these roads is done by York Region. They are signposted with numbers.

The major highways in the Region are:

- Highway 7 (east-west)
- Highway 9 (east-west)
- Highway 48 (north-south)
- Highway 400 (north-south)
- Highway 404 (north-south)
- Highway 407 (east-west)
- Highway 427 (north-south)

Former highways include:

- Highway 11 (north-south)
- Highway 27 (north-south)
- Highway 47 (east-west)
- Highway 49 (east-west)
- Highway 50 (north-south)
  - Note: Highway 27 and Highway 50 are still referred to as such on municipal road signs, but are no longer provincial highways.

=== Air transportation ===
Most air travel is served by Toronto Pearson International Airport, which is outside of York Region and is Canada's largest airport. Markham Airport is a private aerodrome in Markham. There are also a few small airports with unpaved runways serving the region: Hare Field in Holland Landing (East Gwillimbury), Belhaven Airport in Georgina, and Stouffville Aerodrome north of Stouffville.

Buttonville Municipal Airport was a larger regional airport in Markham that was used for general aviation and business aircraft. It closed in November 2023.

=== Public transportation ===
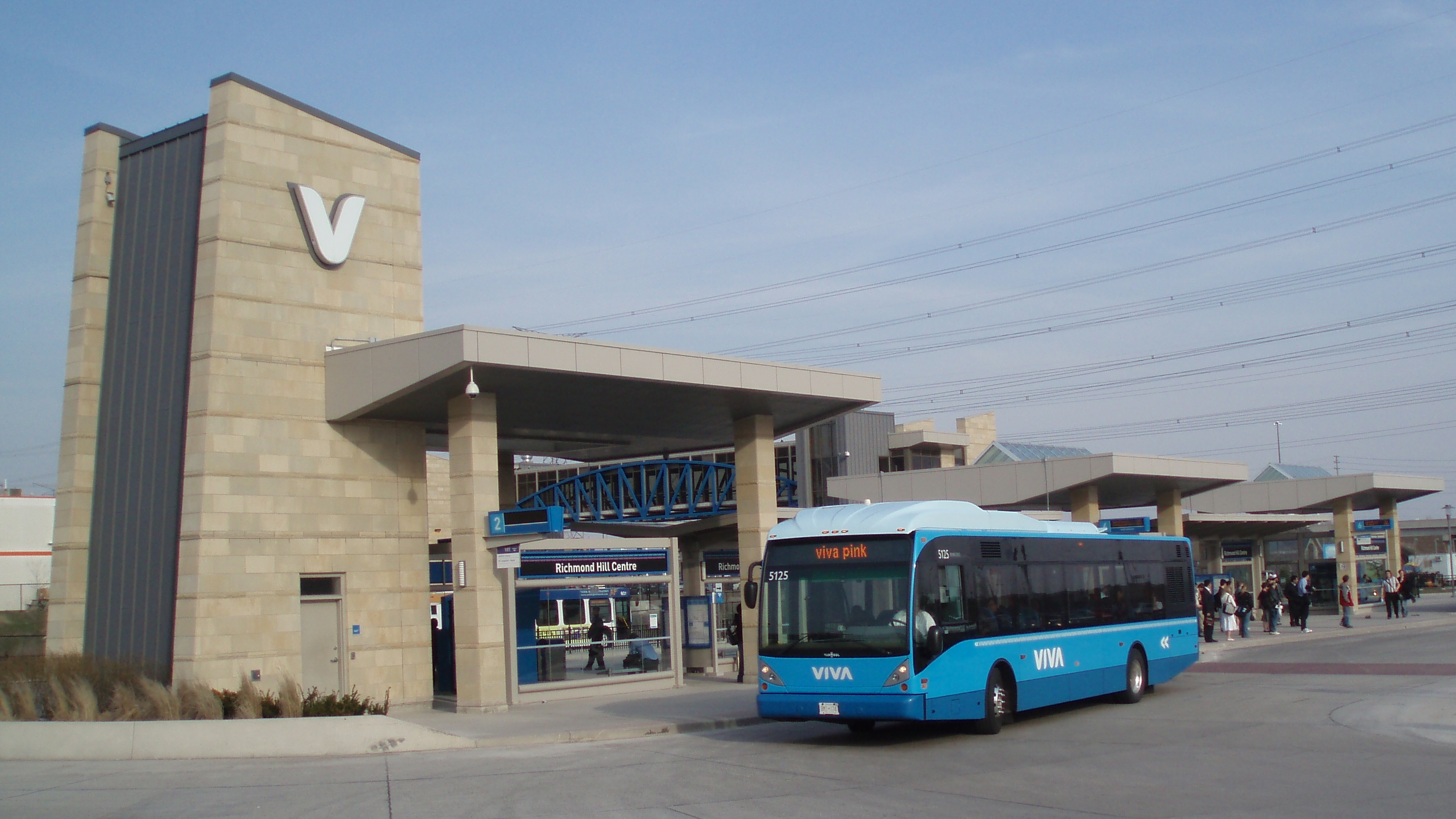
Richmond Hill Centre Terminal at Yonge & Highway 7

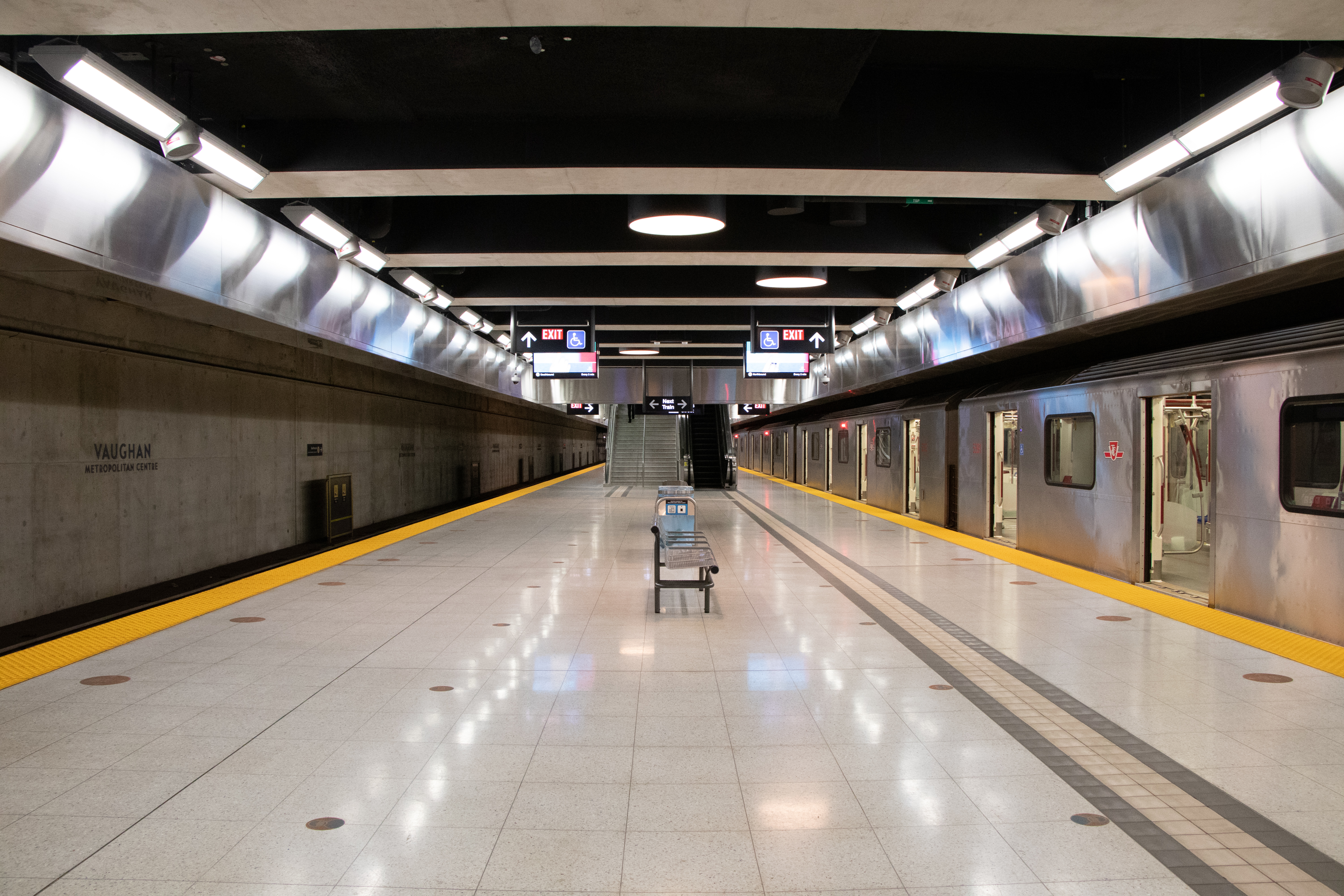
Vaughan Metropolitan Centre station subway platform

York Region is served by:

- York Region Transit (YRT), which includes the Viva bus rapid transit network, is the Region's local transit service
- GO Transit, which provides commuter bus and rail service
- Toronto Transit Commission (TTC), which has several bus routes which cross York's southern border, and which provide service along many north–south arterial streets in Vaughan, Richmond Hill and Markham. The western arm of the TTC's Line 1 Yonge-University extends into Vaughan to serve Vaughan Metropolitan Centre, and a future extension of the Yonge Street (eastern) portion of the line will serve the boundary areas of Vaughan, Richmond Hill, and Markham by the mid-2030's.

Until 2001, the towns of York Region operated separate public transit services, which did not connect very well with each other. YRT was created by the Regional Government to combine five of these services:

- Vaughan Transit
- Markham Transit
- Richmond Hill Transit
- Aurora Transit - merged in 1999 with Newmarket Transit
- Newmarket Transit

Since 2001, bus routes have been extensively enhanced in the five communities which had pre-existing services, but YRT's services to East Gwillimbury is limited to two routes, and service to King, Georgina and Whitchurch-Stouffville are even more limited due to the relatively small populations in each of those towns.

== Water ==
Water in southern York is provided by Toronto Water and Peel Region by way of 3 pumping stations and reservoirs (Bayview, Dufferin and Milliken (tank and underground reservoir)) using water from Lake Ontario. Keswick and Sutton obtain water from Lake Simcoe by way of water treatment plants. The remainder of York obtains water from a combination of water from Lake Ontario and underground wells. Some wells are maintained by the Region and the rest privately.

- Georgina -water from Lake Simcoe and private wells
- East Gwillimbury - region and private wells
- Newmarket - region wells and water from Lake Ontario
- Whitchurch-Stouffville - Region wells, water from Lake Ontario, private wells
- Markham - water from Lake Ontario and private wells
- Richmond Hill - water from Lake Ontario and private wells
- Aurora - water from Lake Ontario and private wells
- Vaughan - water from Lake Ontario and private wells
- King - water from Lake Ontario, Region and private wells

Water is distributed from 14 water pumping stations and stored at 37 elevated tanks and reservoirs:

=== List of water tanks ===
- Reesor Park water tank - built 1971, now out of service and dismantled
- Newmarket - 211 Harry Walker Parkway South
- Richmond Hill - 81 Coons Road
- Schomberg - 186 Church Street, built 1997
- King - 60 Fisher Street, built 1982
- Stouffville - 12519 Tenth Line, built 1984
- Stouffville - Bethesda Rd, built 2005
- Aurora - 126 Allenvale Drive, 240 Orchard Heights Boulevard, built 1984
- Aurora - 180 Bloomington Road, built 2008
- Markham - 4355 14th Avenue

=== Treatment Plants ===
- Sutton Water Treatment Plant - closed
- Georgina Water Treatment Plant - replaces Sutton plant
- Keswick Water Treatment Plant
- Schomberg Water Treatment Plant

== Education ==
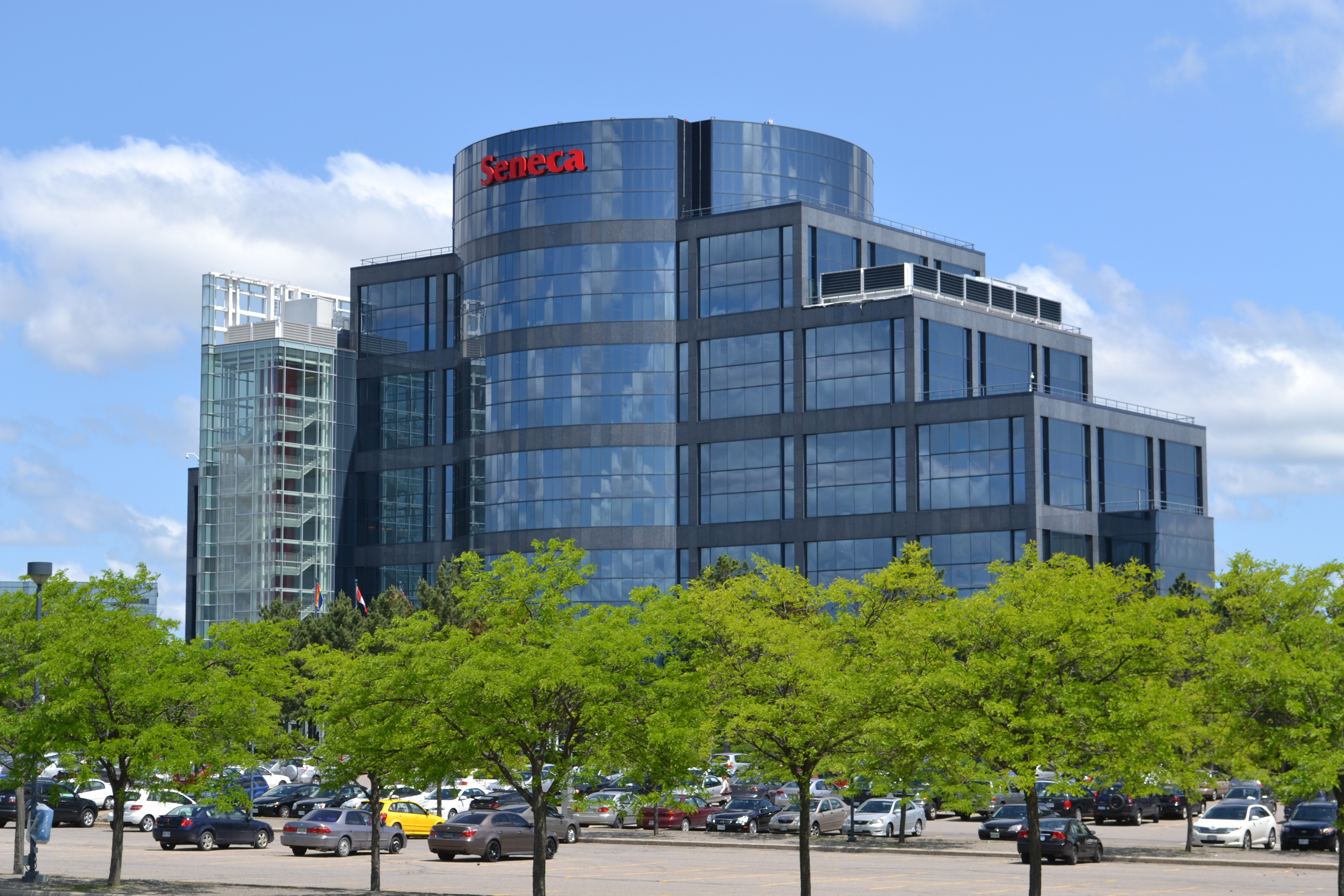
Seneca Polytechnic Markham campus

Four public school boards operate primary and secondary institutions in York Region, Conseil scolaire catholique MonAvenir (CSCM), Conseil scolaire Viamonde (CSV), the York Catholic District School Board (YCDSB), and the York Region District School Board (YRDSB). CSV and YRDSB operate as secular public school boards, the former operating French first language institution, whereas the latter operated English first language institutions. The other two school boards, MonAvenir and YCDSB, operate as public separate school boards, the former operating French first language separate schools, the latter operating English first language separate schools.

YRDSB is the largest public school board in the region, operating 175 elementary schools, and 33 secondary schools. YCDSB operates 83 elementary schools, and 15 secondary schools, while MonAvenir operates five elementary schools, and two secondary schools. CSV is the smallest public school board in the York Region, operating three elementary schools, and one secondary school in the region.

Along with public schools, the region also holds a number of religious and private schools including:

- As-Sadiq Islamic School (Vaughan)
- Academy for Gifted Children (Richmond Hill)
- Country Day School (King)
- Holy Trinity School (Richmond Hill)
- Leo Baeck Day School (Vaughan)
- Ner Israel Yeshiva College (Vaughan)
- Netivot HaTorah Day School (Vaughan)
- Pickering College (Newmarket)
- St. Andrew's College (Aurora)
- St. Thomas of Villanova College (King)
- Town Centre Montessori Private School (Markham)
- Toronto Waldorf School (Vaughan)

In addition to primary and secondary levels of education, the region is also home to post-secondary institutions such as Seneca Polytechnic. The college operates two campuses spread throughout York Region, in King and Markham, as well as additional campuses in Toronto. The region presently does not host a university, but the Markham campus of York University opened in August 2024.

== News media ==
- York Region Media Group
- CKVR - CTV Two (based in Barrie)
- CFU758 - 90.7 RAV FM (Vaughan)
- CKDX 88.5FM - Foxy 88-5 (Newmarket)
- CFMS-FM - 105.9 The Region (Markham)
- CIWS-FM - WhiStle Community Radio Whitchurch–Stouffville

York's news media is also served by the outlets based in Toronto.

== Sister city ==
- Omsk (Russia)

The Region of York signed a "Twinning Agreement" with the city of Omsk, Russia, on August 28, 1997, after it signed a "Friendship Agreement" one year previous.

== See also ==
- List of municipalities in Ontario
- Greater Toronto Area
- Province of Toronto
- List of secondary schools in Ontario#Regional Municipality of York
