= Chippewas of Georgina Island First Nation =

Chippewas of Georgina Island First Nation Waaseyaagmiing Anishinaabek
- Indian reserve
- Chippewas of Georgina Island First Nation Indian Reserve
- Location within Southern Ontario
- Coordinates: 44°20′N 79°17′W
- Country: Canada
- Province: Ontario
- Regional municipality: York
- First Nation: Chippewas of Georgina Island

Area
  - Land: 14.55 km^{2} (5.62 sq mi)

Population (2020)
  - Total: 923
  - Density: 18.9/km^{2} (49/sq mi)
- Website: georginaisland.com

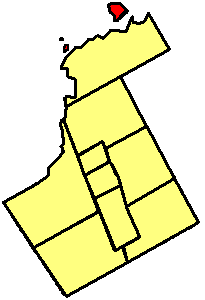
Map of York Region showing Fox, Snake, and Georgina islands.

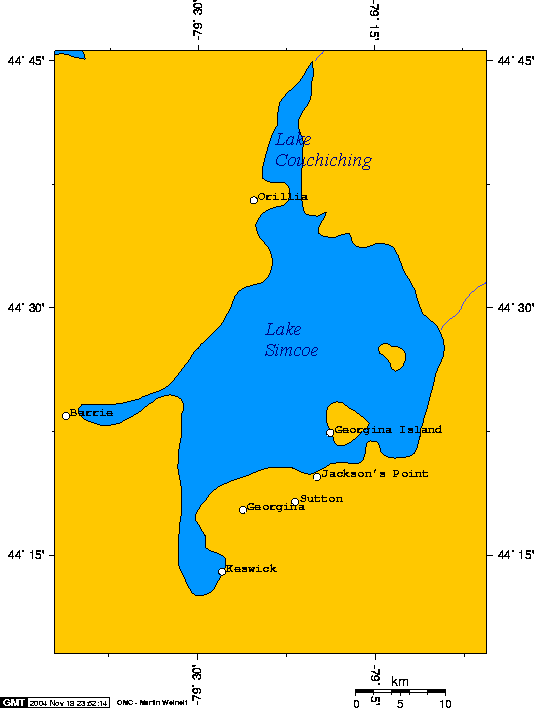
Georgina Island, Lake Simcoe, Ontario

Chippewas of Georgina Island First Nation (Ojibwe: Waaseyaagmiing Anishinaabek) are an Ojibwa (or Anishinaabeg) people located on Georgina Island in Lake Simcoe, Ontario, Canada. In 2008, of the First Nation's registered population of 666 people, 181 lived on, and 485 lived outside, their reserve. As of 2020, the band has a total population of 923 members. They are one of a handful of First Nations in the Toronto Census Metropolitan Area.

== Geography ==
The First Nation has three reserves: the Chippewas of Georgina Island First Nation Indian Reserve, the Chippewas of Georgina Island First Nation 33A Indian Reserve 44°20′N 79°17′W and the shared Chippewa Island Indian Reserve.

The main reserve consists of a small parcel of land near Virginia Beach and three islands on the southern shores of Lake Simcoe:

- Georgina Island
- Snake Island
- Fox Island

The Chippewas of Georgina Island First Nation 33A reserve is a 1.3-hectare (3.2-acre) parcel of land separated from the mainland portion of the Chippewas of Georgina Island First Nation reserve by Black River Road and the private properties along it.

The Chippewa Island reserve is a 3.1-hectare (7.7-acre) reserve consisting of two islands near the Moose Deer Point First Nation in Twelve Mile Bay of Georgian Bay. It is shared with the Chippewas of Rama First Nation and the Beausoleil First Nation.

== Government ==
The reserve government consists of a five-member band council with four councillors and a Chief.

Fire and emergencies services consists of a single fire truck and ambulance. The department is staffed by two full time firefighters (one is the chief) and volunteer responders.

Policing is provided by Georgina Island Police Service with assistance from the Ontario Provincial Police. The force has three officers, and replaced the community officers from the Royal Canadian Mounted Police (primarily from Orillia Detachment and secondary from Toronto) in 1978. GIPS are part of the First Nations Police Service.

== Transportation ==
Access to Georgina Island is by boat to and from the mainland. A marina is located on the southern tip of the island for the ferry and smaller vessels. Built in 1999, the ferry Aazhaawe can carry 18 cars and 50 passengers. Ferry service is seasonal and not provided when Lake Simcoe is frozen over. Fan boats provide access to Georgina (Fox and Snake) during the winter. Georgina Water Taxi's Ahneen provides alternate travel to Georgina Island.

There are a few paved roads on Georgina Island (nine in total) with residents using personal vehicles. There are only unpaved roads on Snake Island and no roads on Fox Island. Primary means of transport to Fox and Snake Islands is by vessels docking on private docks around the islands.

Roads are maintained by the band. There is no airport or heliport on any of the islands.

== Economy ==
The main employers on the reserve beyond the band are geared to tourism on the island. The island has a driving range, bed and breakfast and marina facilities.

== Education ==
Primary education (from kindergarten to Grade 5) is found at a single school, Waabgon Gamig, on Georgina Island. York Region District School Board (YRDSB) provides staffing and assistance. Students from Grades 6 to 12 are required to attend schools (Morning Glory PS and Sutton DHS) on the mainland with YRDSB.

== Health ==
Basic health services are provided at the Georgina Island Health Building by local staff and medical staff visiting from York Region.

For advance care patients would be served at Southlake Health in Newmarket, but also at Uxbridge in Durham Region or Royal Victoria Hospital in Barrie.

== See also ==
- Aboriginal peoples in Ontario
