= Strawberry Island (Hamilton County, New York) =

American island

- Location within New York

Geography
- Location: Raquette Lake
- Coordinates: 43°49′42″N 74°38′40″W
- Highest elevation: 1,762 ft (537.1 m)

Administration
- United States
- State: New York
- County: Hamilton
- Town: Long Lake

Strawberry Island is an island on Raquette Lake in Hamilton County, New York. It is located northeast of Raquette Lake. St Hubert Island is located northeast of Strawberry Island.
