= Strawberry Island (Lake Simcoe) =

Island in Lake Simcoe, Ontario, Canada

Coordinates: 44.55281°N 79.33713°W

Strawberry Island is a 25-acre lake island in Lake Simcoe, Ontario, Canada. It used to be owned and operated by the Roman Catholic Congregation of St. Basil as a place of retreat. Pope John Paul II spent four days on the island in 2002. It is about a two hour drive north of Toronto. In 2007, the island was purchased by Trans America Group.

The island is also within the boundaries of Ramara Township and overall in Simcoe County.
