= Aurora Transit =

Public transit in Aurora, Ontario, Canada

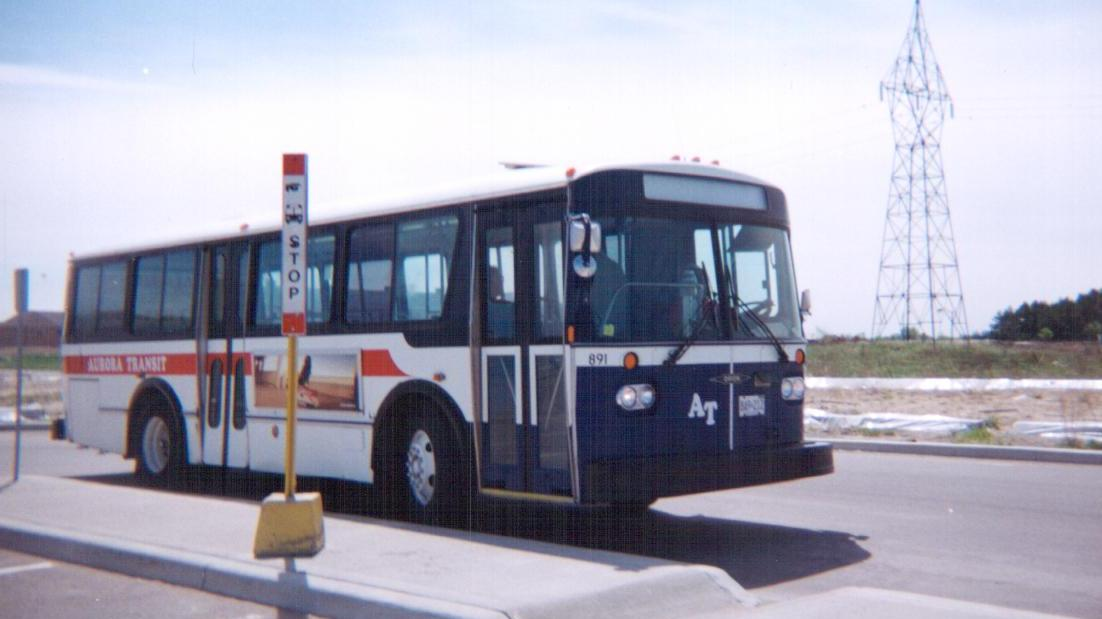
- Aurora Transit 30' Orion I at Bayview Shopping Centre. April 15, 1999
- Founded: 1973
- Defunct: 1999
- Locale: Aurora, Ontario
- Service type: Bus service
- Routes: 1
- Fleet: 2 (1998)
- Fuel type: Diesel
- Operator: Ronald Farquharson

Aurora Transit operated public transit within the town of Aurora, Ontario, Canada, from 1973 to 1999. From 1999 to 2001, transit service in Aurora was operated by Newmarket Transit. Service in the town is now provided by the current York Region Transit system.

Aurora GO Station was the only dedicated transit facility used by Aurora Transit. Aurora Transit was considered an "informal-formal" bus line – one of the few municipally owned lines allowing riders to flag down the bus between stops.

== See also ==
- Markham Transit
- Vaughan Transit
- Richmond Hill Transit
- Newmarket Transit
- York Region Transit

Preceded by None	Public transit in Aurora; 1973–1999	Succeeded by Newmarket Transit (1999–2001); York Region Transit (2001–present)
