= Lake Simcoe =

Lake in Ontario, Canada

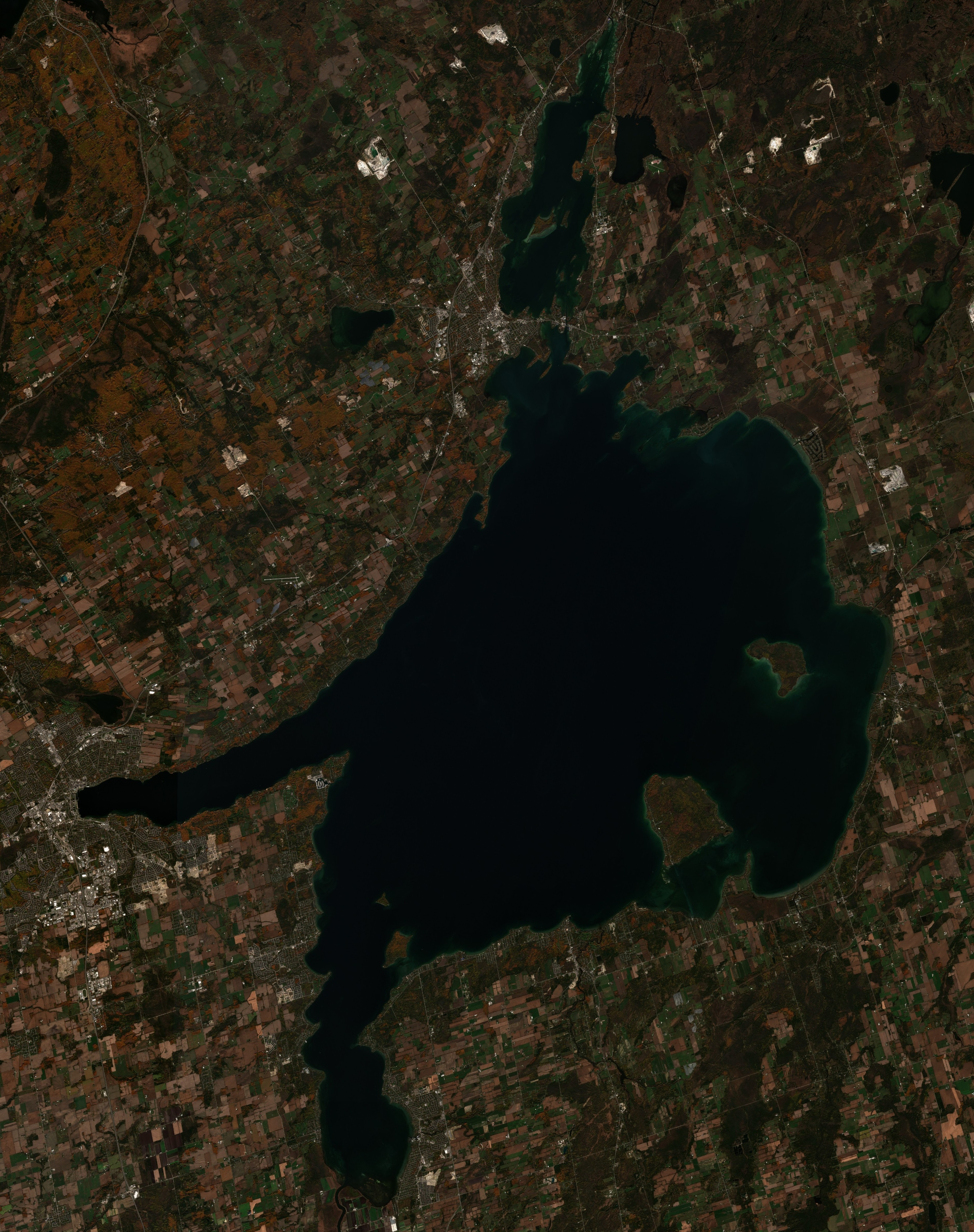
- Satellite view of Lake Simcoe and Lake Couchiching directly north of it

- Location within Southern Ontario
- Location: Ontario
- Coordinates: 44°25′25″N 79°22′16″W
- Type: Freshwater
- Etymology: Named for Captain John Simcoe, RN
- Primary inflows: Holland River, Talbot River
- Primary outflows: Severn River
- Catchment area: 2,840 km^{2} (1,100 sq mi)
- Basin countries: Canada
- Max. length: 30 km (19 mi)
- Max. width: 25 km (16 mi)
- Surface area: 722 km^{2} (279 sq mi)
- Average depth: 15 m (49 ft)
- Max. depth: 41 m (135 ft)
- Water volume: 11.6 km^{3} (2.8 cu mi)
- Shore length^{1}: 240 kilometres (150 mi)
- Surface elevation: 219 m (719 ft)
- Islands: Georgina Island, Thorah Island, Strawberry Island, Snake Island, Fox Island, Helmers Island, Grape Island
- Settlements: Orillia, Barrie
- ^{1} Shore length is not a well-defined measure.

Lake Simcoe is a lake in southern Ontario, Canada, the fourth-largest lake entirely within provincial boundaries, after Lake Nipigon, Lac Seul, and Lake Nipissing. At the time of the first European contact in the 17th century, the lake was called Ouentironk ("Beautiful Water") by the native Wendat/Ouendat (Huron) people. It was also known as Lake Taronto until it was renamed by John Graves Simcoe, the first lieutenant-governor of Upper Canada, in memory of his father, Captain John Simcoe of the Royal Navy. In Anishinaabemowin, the historical language of the First Nations living around this lake, namely Anishinaabek of Rama and Georgina Island First Nations, the lake is called Zhooniyaang-zaaga'igan, meaning "Silver Lake".

== Toponymy ==
Lake Simcoe's name was given by John Graves Simcoe in 1793 in memory of his father, Captain John Simcoe. Captain Simcoe was born on 28 November 1710, in Staindrop, in County Durham, northeast England, and served as an officer in the Royal Navy, dying of pneumonia aboard his ship, HMS Pembroke, on 15 May 1759.

Historically, at the time of the first European contact in the 17th century, the lake was called Ouentironk ("Beautiful Water") by the Wendat (Huron) natives; The Wendat name for the lake was rendered as Wentaron in European sources up until the 20th century. A 1675 map by Pierre Raffeix referred to the lake with the French term Lac Taronto and a 1687 map by Lahontan called it Lake Taronto, while the name Tarontos Lac appeared on a 1678 map of New France by cartographer Jean-Baptiste-Louis Franquelin. The term Taranto refers to an Iroquoian expression meaning gateway or pass. Taronto had originally referred to The Narrows, a channel of water through which Lake Simcoe discharges into Lake Couchiching. (Natural Resources Canada gives a related translation: "it originated as the Mohawk phrase tkaronto, which means "where there are trees standing in the water". According to several Mohawk speakers and aboriginal language expert John Steckley. Mohawks used the phrase to describe The Narrows, where Hurons and other natives drove stakes into the water to create fish weirs. Since then, many subsequent mapmakers adopted this name for it, though cartographer Vincenzo Coronelli is thought to have introduced the more commonly used spelling of Toronto in a map he created in 1695.

The name 'Toronto' found its way to the current city through its use in the name for the Toronto Carrying-Place Trail (or Toronto Passage), a portage running between Lake Ontario and Georgian Bay, that passed through Lake Toronto, which in turn was used as the name for an early French fort located at the foot of the Toronto Passage, on Lake Ontario. The Severn River, its outlet stream, was once called Rivière de Toronto which flows into Georgian Bay, then called Baie de Toronto.

Later French traders referred to it as Lac aux Claies, meaning "Lake of Grids (or Trellises)" in reference to the Huron fishing weirs in the lake. It was known by this name until the beginnings of Upper Canada, when it was renamed to Lake Simcoe.

== Geography ==
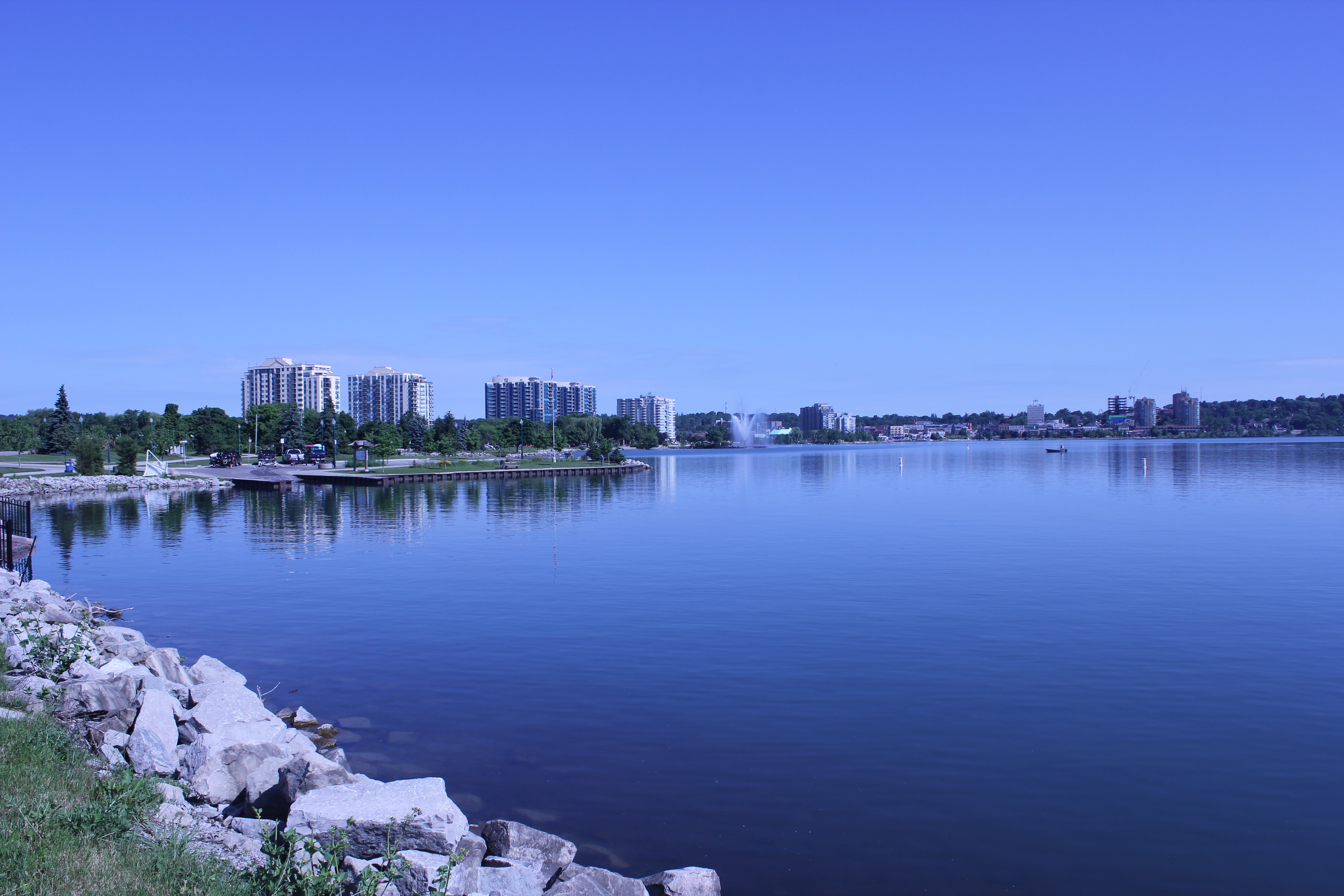
Downtown Barrie and Kempenfelt Bay, the western arm of Lake Simcoe

The lake is bordered by Simcoe County, Durham Region, and York Region. The city of Barrie is located on Kempenfelt Bay, and Orillia is located at the entrance to Lake Couchiching. The watershed draining into the lake contains a population of roughly half a million people, including the northern portion of the Greater Toronto Area (GTA).

The town of Georgina lies along the entire south shore of Lake Simcoe and consists of smaller residential towns and communities, including Keswick on Cook's Bay, Sutton, Jackson's Point, Pefferlaw, and Udora.

The town of Innisfil occupies the western shore south of Barrie and north of Bradford. Eastside Simcoe includes the towns of Beaverton, Brechin and Lagoon City.

Lake Couchiching was at one time thought of as a third bay of Simcoe, known as the Bristol Channel; however, the narrows between the two bodies of water separate them enough to consider this to be another lake. The narrows, known as "where trees stand in the water", an interpretation of the word 'Toronto', was an important fishing point for the First Nations peoples who lived in the area, and the Mohawk term toran-ten eventually gave its name to Toronto by way of the portage route running south from that point, the Toronto Carrying-Place Trail. Radiocarbon dating of surviving stakes reveals that the weirs at The Narrows were in use more than 4,000 years ago. The meaning of "where trees stand in the water", is likely to have originated from Huron practice of driving stakes into the channel sediments to corral fish. Fresh-cut saplings placed in the water and sediments would have sprouted branches and leaves, persisting for some time, leading to a place "where trees stand in the water".

=== Islands ===
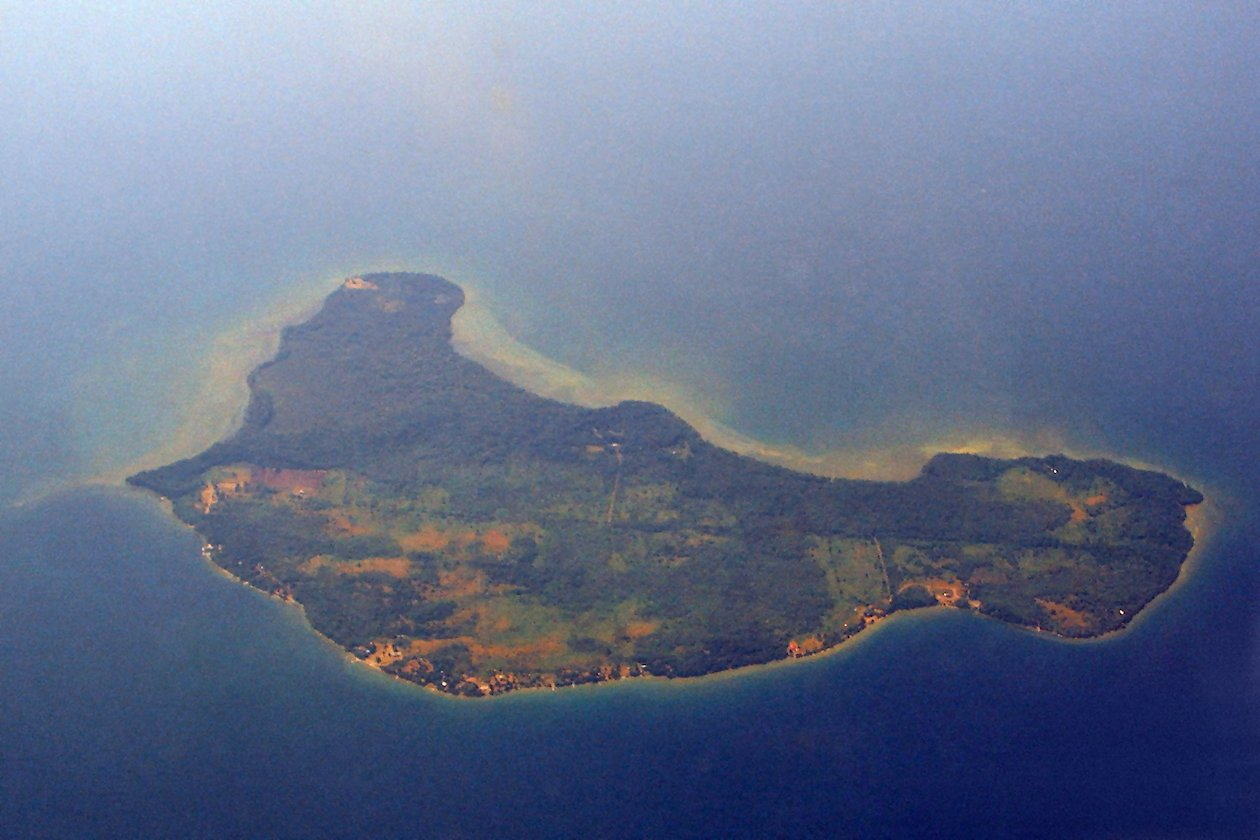
Aerial view of Thorah Island, 2012. The island is one of several contained in Lake Simcoe.

Lake Simcoe contains a large island, Georgina, which along with Snake Island and Fox Island forms the reserve of the Chippewas of Georgina Island First Nation. The lake is dotted with several smaller islands, including Thorah Island (a cottage destination), Strawberry Island, Snake Island, Helmers Island and Fox Island. Pope John Paul II stayed on Strawberry Island for four days just before World Youth Day 2002 in Toronto.

Before the completion of the Trent Severn Waterway, the water level on Lake Simcoe was quite low enabling residents to cross in wagons or walk in ankle deep water to the mainland. However, when it was completed, the water table increased by several feet. Grape Island on the north end the lake is located off of Orillia. To the east of Grape Island is Goffatt Island, a small and private island located within Ramara.

Georgina, Snake and Fox Islands are within York Region, Thorah is within Durham Region, where as Strawberry Island and Helmers Island are privately owned but within the boundaries of Ramara in Simcoe County. Grape is within Orillia and Goffatt is within Ramara with both owned privately by residents.

== Geology ==
The lake is about 30 kilometres (19 mi) long, 25 kilometres (16 mi) wide and 722 square kilometres (279 sq mi) in area. Lake Simcoe is a remnant of a much bigger prehistoric lake known as Lake Algonquin. This lake's basin also included Lake Huron, Lake Michigan, Lake Superior, Lake Nipigon, and Lake Nipissing. The melting of an ice dam at the close of the last ice age greatly reduced water levels in the region, leaving the lakes of today.

The lake is located on Paleozoic limestone of the Ordovician period. However, due to deep deposits of glacial sediments, this bedrock only appears exposed along the lakeshore on Georgina Island. This rock, however, also appears along the shore of Lake Couchiching, where sediments are thinner. The outlet of the lake at the north end of Lake Couchiching is controlled by Precambrian bedrock which first makes its appearance about mid-way along this lake. As a result, the lake has persisted to the present, with the outlet-flow unable to cut down through the rock, and thereby draining the lake. This is unlike its one-time smaller sister-lake of 'Lake Minesing' to the west, being a remnant of Lake Algonquin, and, later the Nipissing stage of Lake Huron. This lake's outlet was founded on sediments located near Edenvale, which have largely been cut through, draining most of the lake. Today 'Lake Minesing' exists as the Minesing Swamp, but it re-establishes itself for a short period each spring when spring run-off floods the basin.

Isostatic rebound from the retreat of the last glaciers results in a steady rise of Lake Simcoe, particularly at its south end, and is further responsible for the deep organic sediments that have accumulated in its one-time shallow southern arm, known as the Holland Marsh. Here, organic deposits created by vegetation have largely kept pace with the steady rise in water level, and today supports extensive market gardening. All rivers, and most streams, flowing into the lake have wide, deep, navigable mouths as a consequence of the rising waters drowning the river channels.

2017 data for the year prior from the NOAA shows the lake has a yearly average surface temperature of 2.5 °C (36.5 °F).

== Ecology ==
An ice fisherman at an ice shanty on Lake Simcoe, 1959

When a lake is healthy, cold-water fish such as lake trout, herring, and whitefish are abundant and active. It is sometimes known as Canada's ice fishing capital.

=== Ecological issues ===
Lake Simcoe has been victim to significant eutrophication. Lake Simcoe has seen a dramatic decline in some fish species, along with an increase in algae blooms and aquatic weed growth. Phosphorus emissions from both urban and rural sources have upset the lake's ecosystem and fostered excessive aquatic plant growth, raising water temperatures, and decreasing oxygen levels, thereby rendering limited breeding grounds inhospitable.

Lake Simcoe has been victim to zebra mussel, purple loosestrife, black crappie, spiny water flea, round goby, rusty crayfish and Eurasian milfoil invasions.

The zebra mussel, which arrived in North American waters in 1985, originated in the Black Sea and Caspian Sea area and is thought to have been brought to North America in the ballast of foreign freighters. Zebra mussels are particularly harmful to Lake Simcoe because they increase the clarity of the water allowing sunlight to penetrate to the bottom of the lake, where more algae and aquatic weeds can grow, accelerating the eutrophication process.

The Rainbow Smelt are another introduced species and they were first observed in the early 1960s. They were believed to compete with native Lake Whitefish and be somewhat responsible for a decline in their populations.

Several initiatives, such as the Lake Simcoe Environmental Management Strategy (LSEMS), the Lake Simcoe Conservation Foundation, and the Lake Simcoe Region Conservation Authority, are making efforts to rectify some of the lake's environmental woes. A local activist group, The Ladies of the Lake, are using the $250,000 they raised from the sale of a nude picture calendar to rally government, business, the school system, and the local citizenry to rescue the lake. Several towns and communities on the lakeshore depend on Lake Simcoe for their drinking water.

The Region of York is currently finalizing plans for a sewage treatment plant to be constructed on the shores of Lake Simcoe to be located on the Holland River in Cook's Bay. This plant's purpose is to support intensification of development in the Lake Simcoe watershed.

== Watershed ==
A number of southern Ontario rivers flow, generally north, into the lake, draining 2,581 km^{2} (997 sq mi) of land. From the east, the Talbot River, part of the Trent–Severn Waterway, is the most important river draining into Lake Simcoe, connecting the lake with the Kawartha lakes system and Lake Ontario. From its connection to Lake Couchiching, the Severn River is the only drainage from the lake to Georgian Bay, part of Lake Huron (Simcoe itself is not one of the Great Lakes). The canal locks of the Trent-Severn Waterway make this connection navigable.

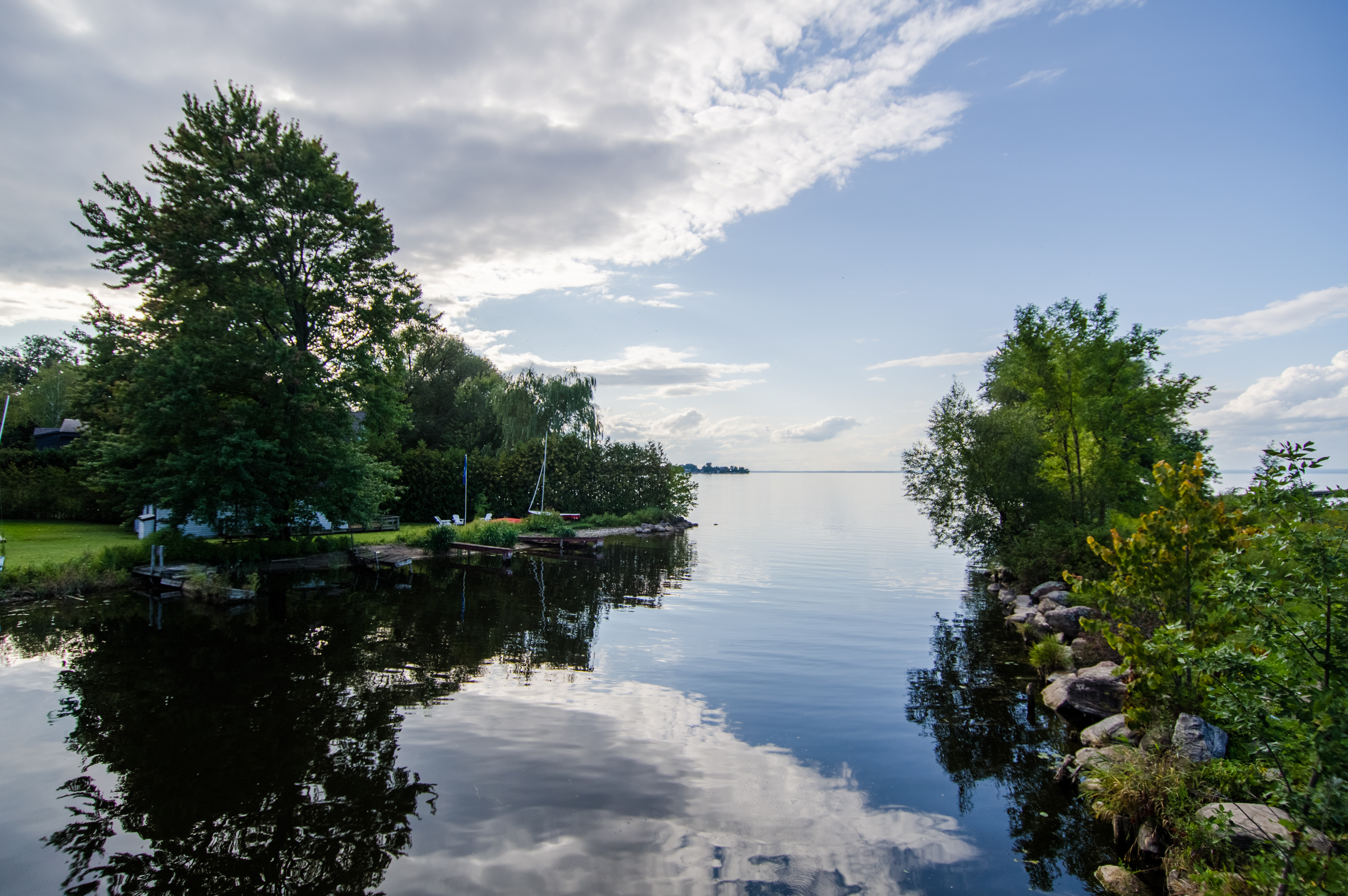
The mouth of the Black River at the southern shoreline of Lake Simcoe

A number of creeks and rivers flow into the lake:

- Black River
- Bluffs Creek
- Beaver River
- Holland River
- Maskinonge River
- Pefferlaw River
- Talbot River
- White's Creek
- Duclos Creek
- Burnie Creek
- Virginia CreekA
- Virginia CreekB
- Virginia CreekC
- Virginia CreekD

== Recreation ==
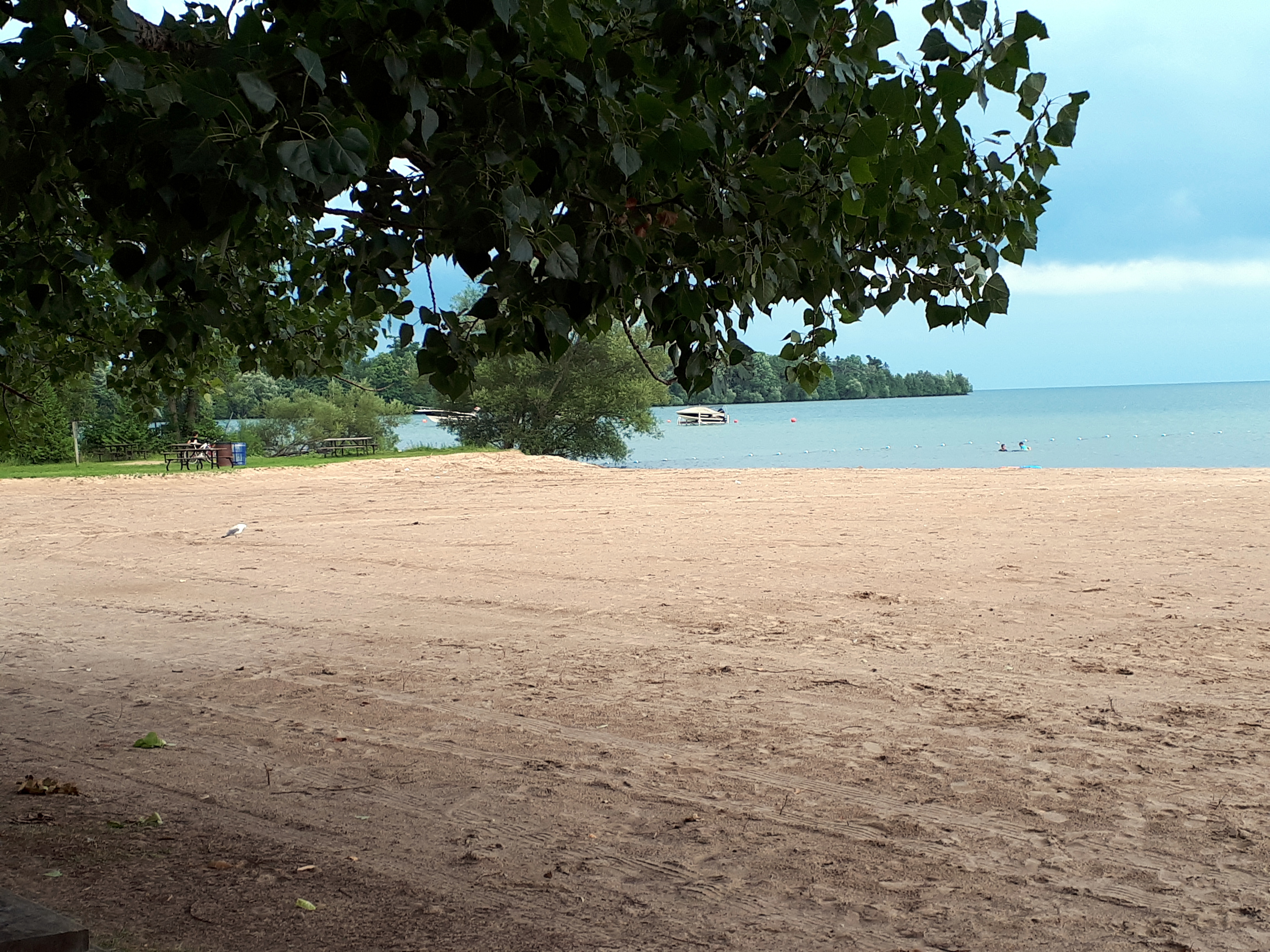
A beach at Mara Provincial Park

The lake has little commercial activity, but sees many recreational uses. In the winter, it freezes over completely and hosts a number of ice fishing competitions, making it one of the most intensely fished lakes in Ontario. However, claims that it is one of the world's largest lakes that freeze over completely in winter are pure speculation, and, in fact, spurious; Canada alone has a large number of lakes of the same size or larger that do the same.

In the summer, fishing is still an attraction; however, there are also a number of poker runs, jet-skiing, and other boating events. The lake is surrounded with summer cottages leading to heavy recreational and boating use in summer.

There are a number of beaches which attract visitors from the greater Toronto area, as Lake Simcoe has a reputation for cleaner and warmer water than nearby Lake Ontario beaches. Many of the beaches are used for kite surfing as well. Willow Beach in Georgina on the south shore is one of the largest and most popular public beaches on Lake Simcoe.

There are seven yacht clubs (sailing) around the lake, which host a number of regattas, and an active sailing community exists on the lake.

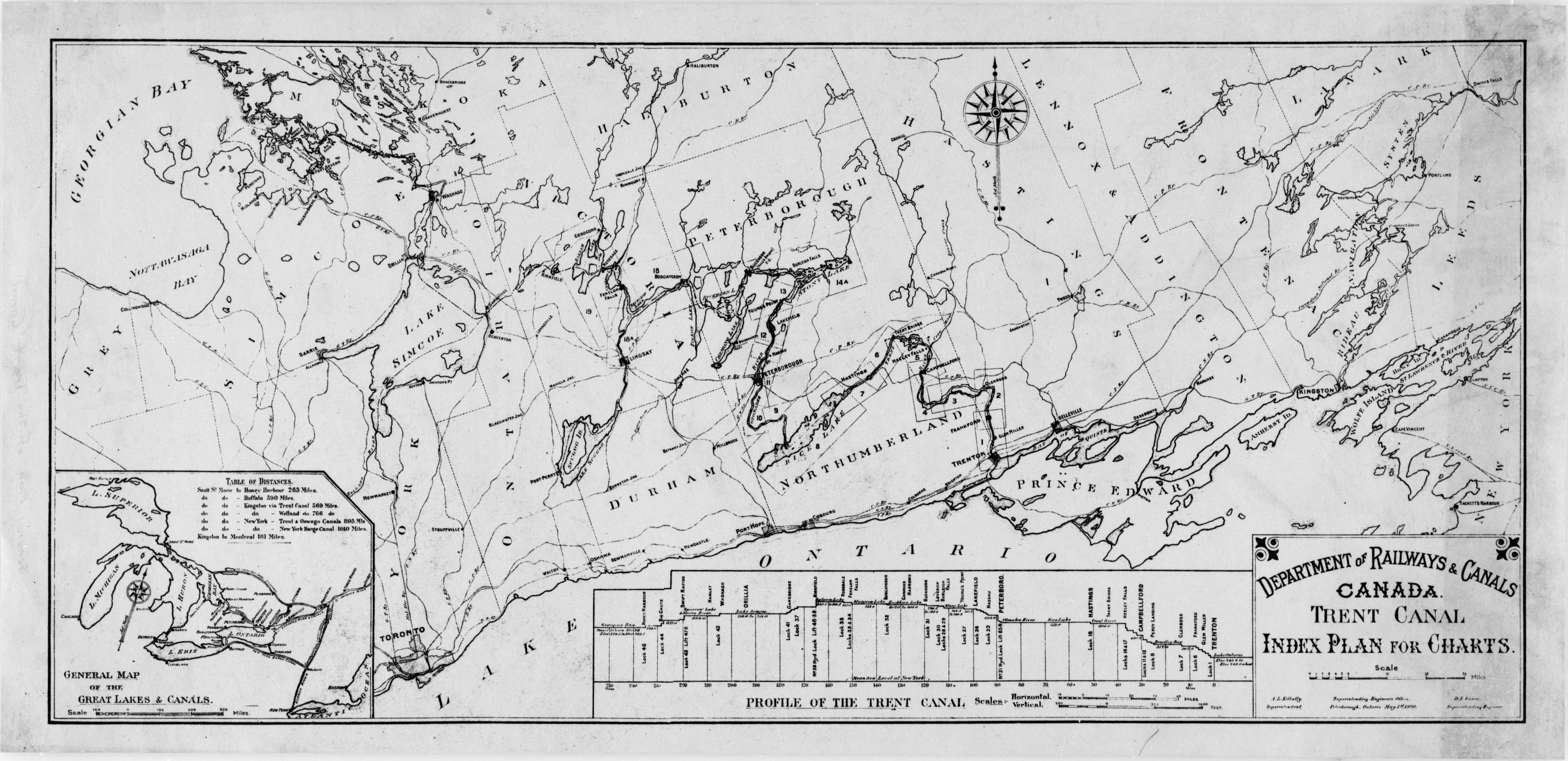
Map of the Trent-Severn Waterway, a canal route that connects Lake Simcoe with several other major waterways

The lake also forms part of the Trent–Severn Waterway system that links Lake Ontario and Georgian Bay/Lake Huron.

Lake Simcoe is also well known for its scuba diving. The ship J. C. Morrison sank in 1857 and is a great dive site off Centennial Beach. There are also a number of other popular scuba diving entrance points popular among freshwater divers. Kempenfelt Bay is the most popular for scuba divers as it is the deepest. Visibility ranges from over 30 feet (9 m) to almost zero.

=== Maritime enforcement ===
Ontario Provincial Police, South Simcoe Police Service, York Regional Police, Durham Regional Police, and Barrie Police have marine units that patrol on the waters of the lake. Georgina Island Police patrol on Georgina, Fox and Snake Islands with some capability to respond to marine needs off these islands. As part of Orillia, Grape Island is policed by the OPP.
