= Thorah Island =

Lake island on Lake Simcoe, Ontario, Canada

Coordinates: 44.4484°N 79.2281°W

Thorah
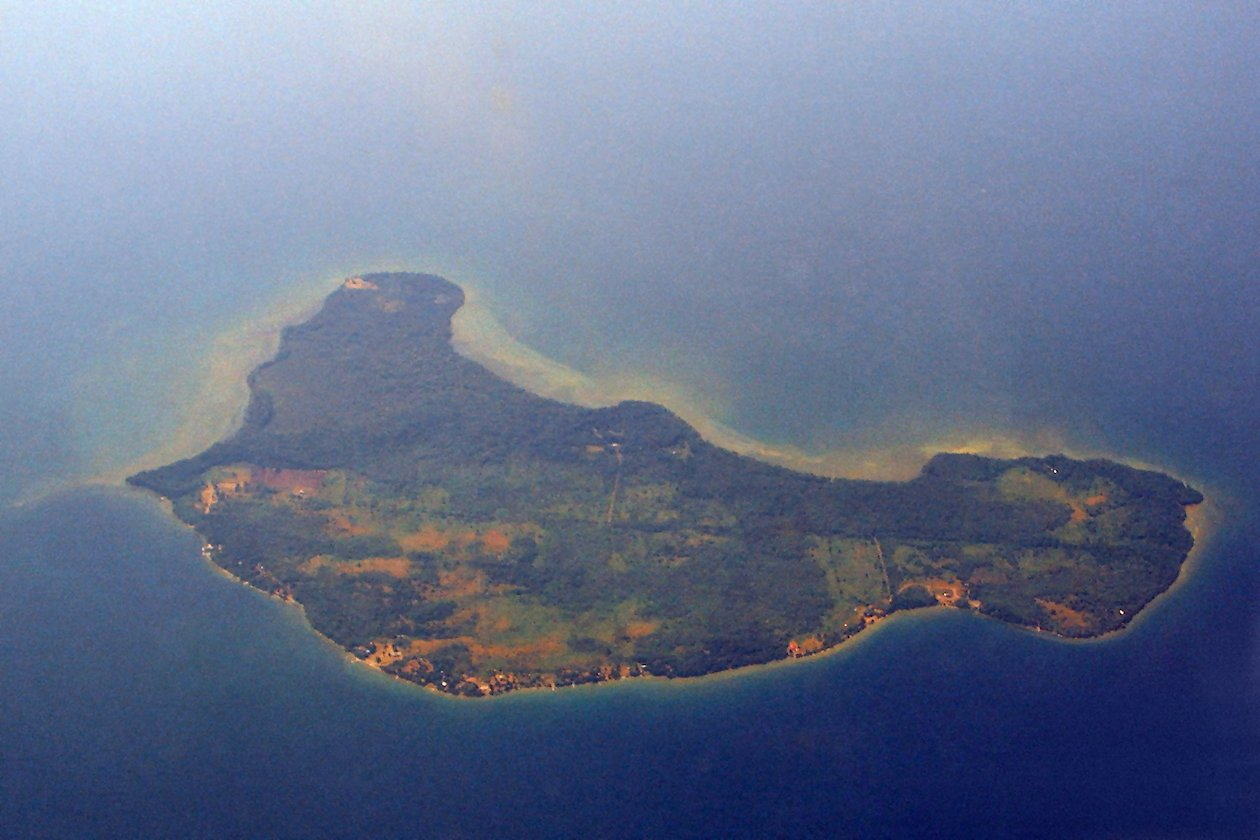
- Interactive map of Thorah

Geography
- Location: Lake Simcoe
- Area: 6 km^{2} (2.3 sq mi)

Administration
- Canada
- Province: Ontario
- Region: Durham
- Municipality: Brock

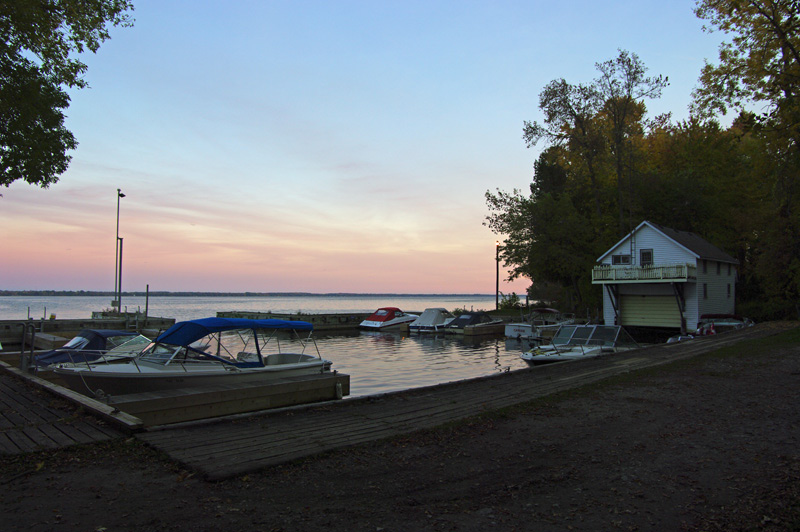
The Thorah Island Harbour.

Thorah Island is a lake island located in the southeast portion of Lake Simcoe, approximately 4 kilometres (2.5 mi) west from Beaverton in Ontario, Canada. The island, part of Brock Township, is approximately 1,450 acres (6 km^{2}) in size and the land is divided mainly between wooded and wooded-swamp terrain. Some land has been cleared for farming and recreational purposes but much of the agricultural land has fallen into disuse and has grown over. Centre Road runs from the east side of the island to the west side but is not much more than a dirt path. A small harbour, owned by the Township of Brock, exists on the east side of the island, directly across from Beaverton Harbour. There are several sandy beaches on the west side of the island, but most of the island's shore is rocky.

Thorah as well as three other islands in Lake Simcoe were ceded by the Chippewa people in 1856 to the British Crown on the agreement that the land would be sold and the proceeds invested for the descendants of the ceding chiefs. Following this sale William Napier made the first survey of the island in 1856.

Thorah was originally used as a recreational destination in the late nineteenth century by a group of four businessmen from Toronto who came to the island to camp and fish. The island currently (2005) has a seasonal population of 147 that include several descendants of the original group.

Today the island is used by the Honey Bee Research Centre at the University of Guelph as an isolated mating station for the Buckfast Bee lines maintained by the research centre.

The island was also named Canise (or Kanise) Island by Governor John Graves Simcoe in 1793 to honour a local native chief by that name. In the above-mentioned treaty between the natives and the British the island is known as Plum Island. Neither of these names is in popular use today.

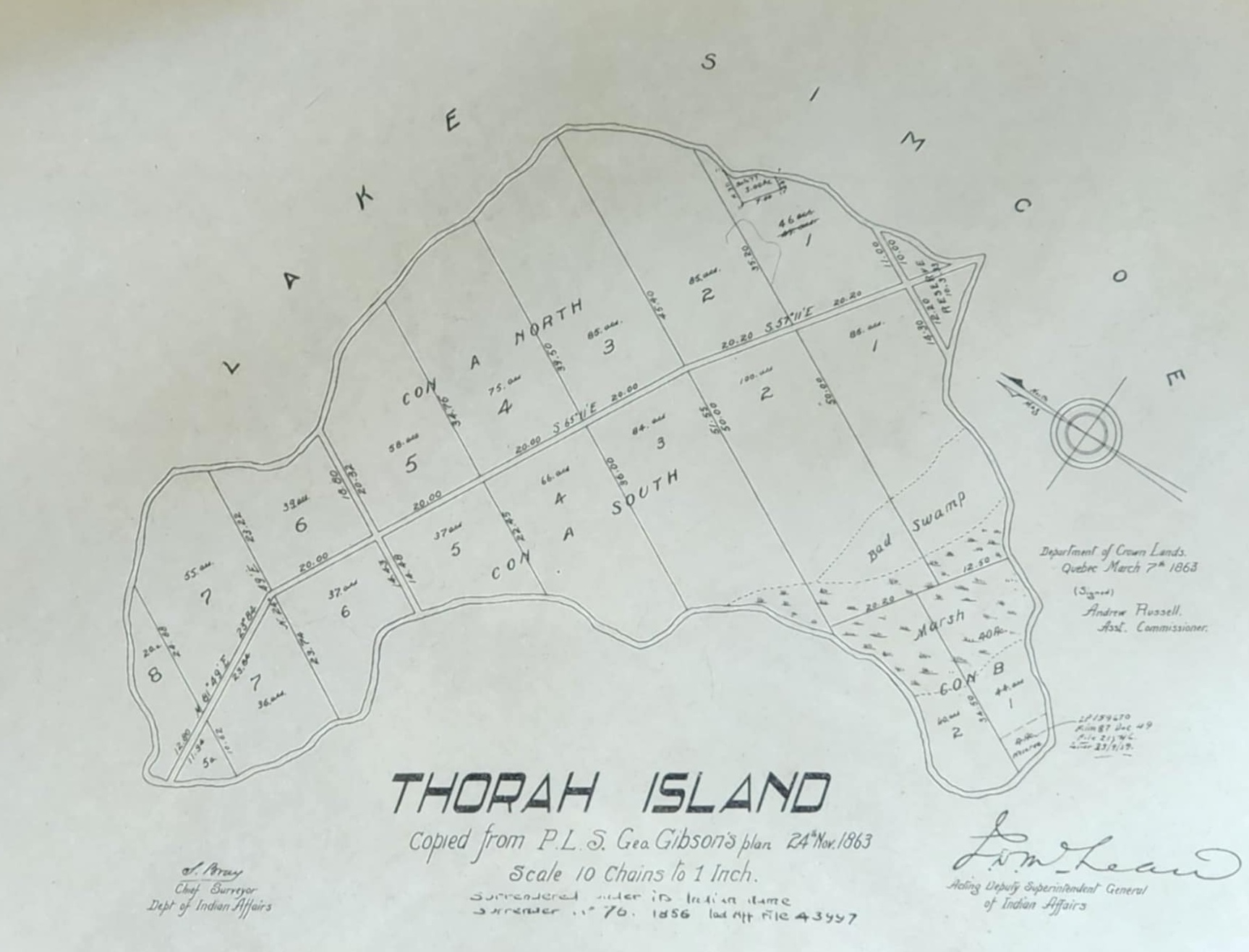
Thorah Island Map of 1863

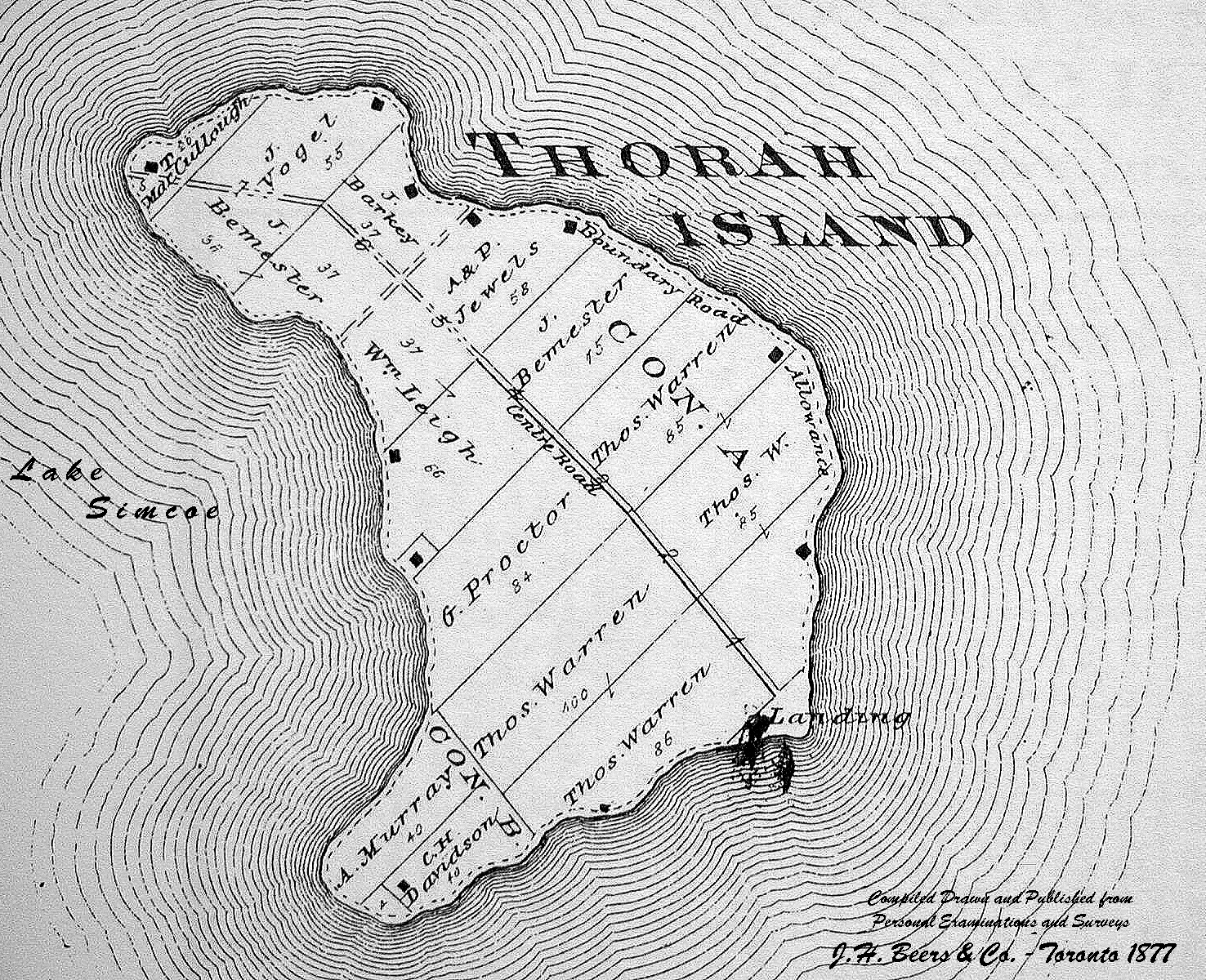
Map of Thorah Island in 1877

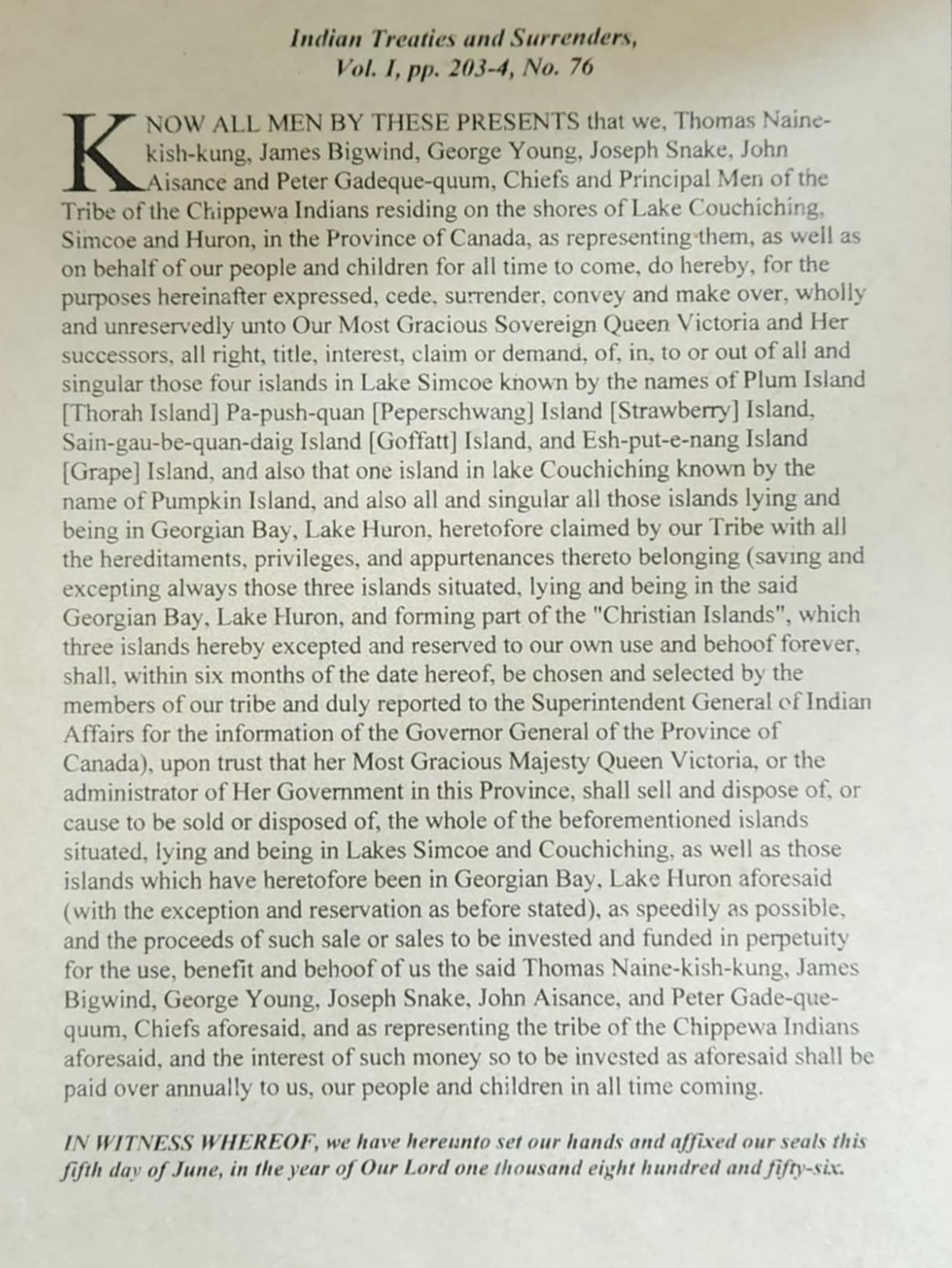
Indian Treatie No 76
