= Fox Island (Ontario) =

Island in Ontario, Canada

Coordinates: 44.336°N 79.490°W

Fox Island is one of the islands that are located in Lake Simcoe, Ontario, Canada. The island is part of the Georgina township alongside the other three islands in Georgina (unlike Thorah Island which is part of Brock township). Fox Island is about 0.2 square kilometers or 48 acres. There are some cottages on the island. There are no paved roads on the island but there are some footpaths. The only way to access the island is by boat.
