= List of islands of Ontario =

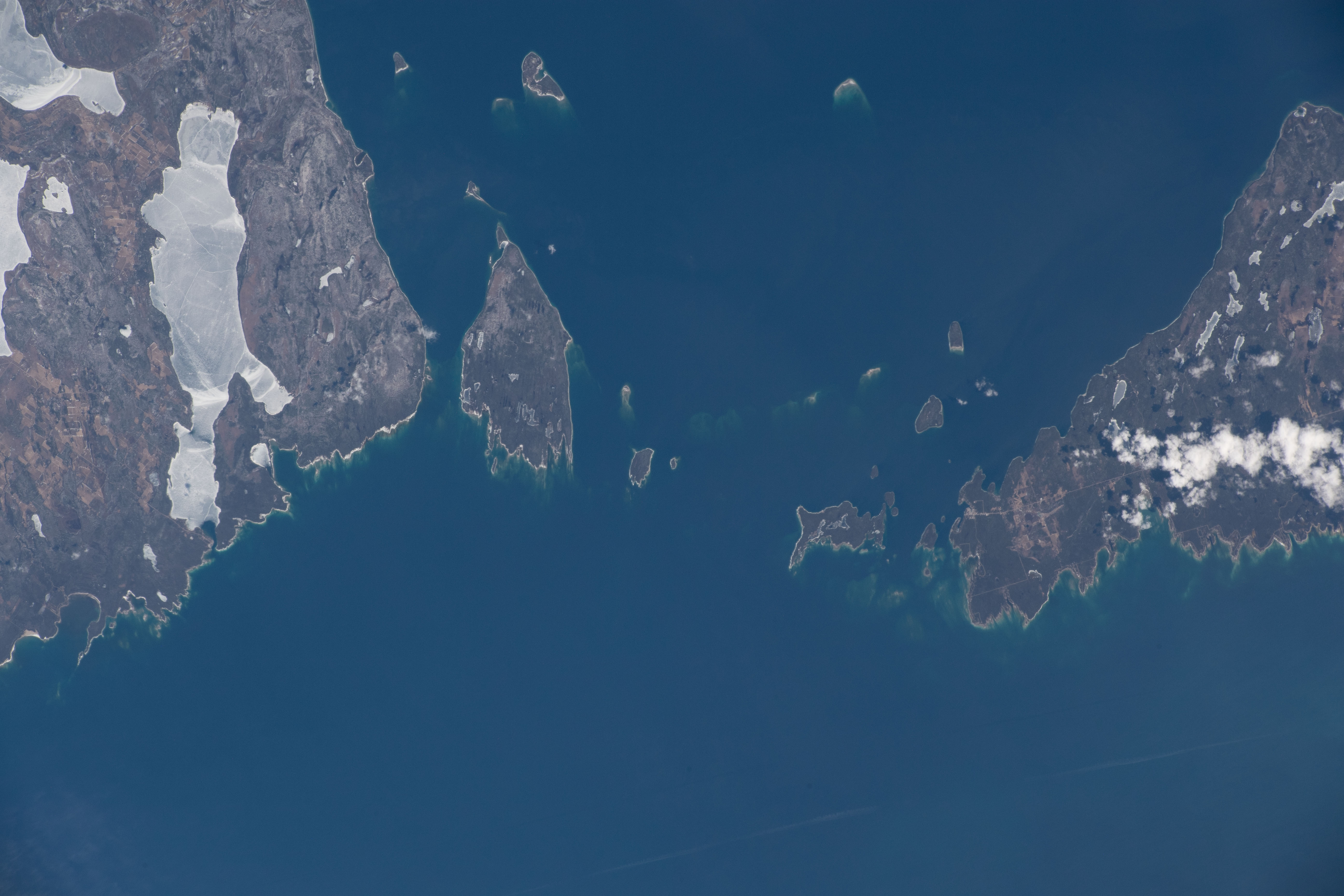
View of islands in Lake Huron between Manitoulin Island (left) and the northwestern tip of the Bruce Peninsula (right). North is oriented towards the upper left in this photo taken from the International Space Station on April 10, 2022. The largest island completely shown is Fitzwilliam Island on the left side.

This is a list of islands of Ontario, by lake or river.

== Lake Abitibi ==
- Black Island
- Kenosha Island
- Mistaken Islands

== Albany River ==
- Albany Island
- Big Island
- Blackbear Island
- Byrd Island
- Cheepay Island
- Comb Island
- Fafard Island
- Faries Island
- Hat Island
- Hill Island
- Kagami Island
- Kakago Island
- Linklater Island
- Norran Island
- Oldman Island
- Peacock Island
- Robins Island
- Sand Cherry Island
- Stonebasket Island
- Tanti Island
- Willow Island

== Balsam Lake ==
- Grand Island

== Big Gull Lake - West End - Little Gull Lake ==
- Belle Island
- Carlson Island
- Snake Island
- Chimney Island
- Goat Island
- Race Island
- Rifle Island

== Big Gull Lake - East End ==
- Beacon Island
- Bear Boundary Island
- Big Boundary Island
- Boundary Island
- Brothers Island
- Green Island
- Johns Island
- Long Island
- Marshall Island
- Pogue's Island
- Redlac Island
- Sister Island
- Three Sister's Island
- Viking Point Island
- Whalen Island
- Whispering Pines Island

== Big Rideau Lake ==
- Big Island
- Exe Island
- Grindstone Island
- Land's End Island
- Long Island
- Oak Island
- Tar Island
- Turnip Island
- Tower Island

== Buckhorn Lake ==
- Emerald Isle
- Fox Island
- Nichol Island

== Cataraqui River ==
- Isle of Man

== Charleston Lake ==
- Crosier Island

== Lake Chemong ==
- Big Island

== Lake Couchiching ==
- Chiefs Island

== Cranberry Lake ==
- Beaupre Island

== Detroit River ==
- Bois Blanc Island
- Fighting Island
- Peche Island
- Turkey Island

== Lake Erie ==
- Big Chicken Island
- Chick Island
- East Sister Island
- Hen Island
- Middle Island
- Mohawk Island
- North Harbour Island
- Pelee Island
- Ryerson's island

== Fairbank Lake ==
- Fairbank Island

== French River ==
- Cantin Island
- Eighteen Mile Island
- Fourmile Island
- Okikendawt Island
- Potvin Island

== Gloucester Pool ==
- Broadview Island
- Deer Island
- Lauley Island

== Grand River ==
- Kerby Island

== Gull Lake ==
- Long Island

== Lake Huron ==
- Argyle Island
- Beament Island
- Burke Island
- Chantry Island
- Cigar Island
- Cockburn Island
- Cove Island
- Cranberry Island
- Devil Island
- Doctor Island
- Great Duck Island
- Evelyn Island
- Fitzwilliam Island
- Garden Island
- Ghegheto Island
- Greene Island
- Gull Rock
- Herschel Island
- Indian Island
- Jack Island
- Kitchener Island
- Kolfage Island
- Little Kitchener Island
- Lonely Island
- Lucas Island
- Lyal Island
- Main Station Island
- Manitoulin Island
- McCallum Island
- Middle Duck Island
- North Otter Island
- Oar Island
- Outer Duck Island
- Perseverance Island
- Peters Island
- Pine Island
- Russell Island
- Smokehouse Island
- South Otter Island
- St. Joseph Island
- Stevens Island
- Thibault Island
- Turning Island
- Twin Island
- Tyson Island
- Vimy Island
- Western Duck Island
- Whiskey Island
- Whitefish Island
- Yeo Island

=== Georgian Bay ===
- Aberdeen Island
- Badgeley Island
- Barrier Island
- Bateau Island
- Bears Rump Island
- Beausoleil Island
- Beckwith Island
- Big Burnt Island
- Bone Island
- Bustard Islands
- Centre Island
- Champlain Island
- Champlain Monument Island
- Christian Island
- Churchill Islands
- Club Island
- Cockburn Island
- Crescent Island
- Dead Island
- Echo Island
- Elizabeth Island
- Elmtree Island
- Foster Island
- Fox Island
- Franklin Island
- French River Island
- Fryingpan Island
- Flowerpot Island
- George Island
- Giants Tomb Island
- Governor Island
- Gray Island
- Griffith Island
- Halfmoon Island
- Hatch Island
- Hay Island
- Heisey Islands
- Hen and Chicken Island
- Hertzberg Island
- Hope Island
- Huckleberry Island
- Kelvin Island
- King's Island
- Kokanongwi Island
- Lonely Island
- Lookout Island
- Loon Island
- Maxwell Island
- McCoy Islands
- McLaren Island
- McQuade Island
- Methodist Island
- Mink Islands
- Minnicognashene Island
- Moon Island
- Mowat Island
- North Limestone Island
- North Watcher Island
- Northwest Burnt Island
- Nottawasaga Island
- Oak Islands
- Oak Island
- Otter Island
- Parry Island
- Pine Island
- Pittsburg Island
- Pleasant Island
- Portage Island
- Rabbit Island
- Rose Island
- Sandy Island
- Sans Souci Island
- Sharp Island
- Shawanaga Island
- Smooth Island
- Snake Islands
- South Limestone Island
- South Watcher Island
- Tanvat Island
- Thirty Thousand Islands
- Tonches Island
- Turning Island
- Umbrella Islands
- Wabeck Island
- Wall Island
- Western Islands
- White Cloud Island
- Wreck Island

=== North Channel ===
- Amedroz Island
- Barren Island
- Barrie Island
- Bateman Island
- Batture Island
- Bears Back Island
- Beauty Island
- Beaver Island
- Belleau Island
- Bourinot Island
- Carpmael Island
- Crawford Island
- Crescent Island
- Darch Island
- Eastern Island
- East Rous Island
- Egg Island
- Elm Island
- Fanny Island
- Five Islands
- Galt Island
- Gertrude Islands
- Goat Island
- Gooseberry Island
- Great La Cloche Island
- Griffith Island
- Henry Island
- Heywood Island
- High Island
- Hog Island
- Little La Cloche Island
- Louisa Island
- Matheson Island
- McGregor Island
- McTavish Island
- Meredith Island
- Ned Island
- Partridge Island
- Sagamok Island
- Schreiber Island
- St. Joseph Island
- St. Just Island
- Strawberry Island
- Vidal Island
- Wabos Island
- West Mary Island
- West Rous Island

=== Parry Sound ===
- Elizabeth Island
- Huckleberry Island
- Mowat Island

==== Hay Bay ====
- Clark Island

=== Severn Sound ===
- Green Island
- Little Beausoleil Island
- Potato Island
- Present Island
- Quarry Island
- Roberts Island

== Lake Joseph ==
- Cameron Island
- Chief's Island
- Yoho Island
- Gitchie Island

== Lake Kagawong ==
- Bass Island
- Gull Island
- Kakawaie Island
- Little Island

== Kawagama Lake ==
- Dennison Island
- Big Trout Island
- Bear Island
- Echo Island
- Little Trout Island
- Trout Island

== Larder Lake ==
- Big Pete Island
- Island U

== Lower Buckhorn Lake ==
- Wolf Island

== McArthur Lake ==
- McArthur Island
- Sharprock Island
- Blueberry Island
- Hidden Island
- Delta Island
- Shadfly Island
- Olyjian Isle
- Diorite Island
- Midway Island
- Crayfish Island
- Cat Island
- Maziic Island
- Taylor's Island

== Lake Mindemoya ==
- Treasure Island

== Mississippi River ==
- Greig Island

== Moose River ==
- Moose Factory Island

== Lake Muskoka ==
- Acton Island
- Browning Island
- Bigwin Island
- Crown Island
- Eilean Gowan Island
- Gairney Island
- Rankin Island
- Isle of Skye
- Taylor Island

== Niagara River ==
- Cedar Island
- Gull Island
- Navy Island

== Lake Nipigon ==
- Geike Island
- Kelvin Island
- Logan Island
- Murchison Island
- Shakespeare Island

== Lake Nipissing ==
- Burnt Island
- Burrit Island
- East Hardwood Island
- Garden Island
- Goose Islands
- Great Manitou Island
- Gull Islands
- Iron Island
- Little Manitou Island
- Little Oak Island
- Manitou Islands
- Maskinoge Island
- Rankin Island
- Rock Islands
- Sandy Island
- Smith Island
- West Hardwood Island

== Lake Ontario ==
- Amherst Island
- Bayfield Island
- False Duck Island
- Frontenac Islands
- Greene Island
- Gull Island
- Hickory Island
- High Bluff Island
- Horseshoe Island
- Main Duck Island
- Nicholson Island
- Scotch Bonnet Island
- Simcoe Island
- Timber Island
- Toronto Islands
- Waupoos Island
- Wolfe Island

=== Bay of Quinte ===
- Bassett Island
- Big Island
- Lyons Island
- Salmon Island

=== See also ===
- Thousand Islands

== Ottawa River ==
- Alexandra Island
- Amanda Island (submerged by dam)
- Aylmer Island
- Basil Island
- Bate Island
- Bay Island (submerged by dam)
- Beacon Island
- Beckett Island
- Bell Island
- Big Island
- Big Elbow Island
- Boom Island
- Bruyère Island
- Burnt Island
- Butternut Island
- Cape Island
- Carl Island
- Cedar Island
- Chapman Island
- Chartrand Island
- Chenaux Island
- Christie Island
- Clarence Island
- Clement Island
- Coffin Island
- Coreille Island
- Corinne Island
- Cornelius Island
- Cotnam Island
- Crab Islands
- Cunningam Island
- Cushing Island
- Daisy Island
- Davis Island
- Deep River Islet
- Demers Island
- Dow Island
- Dunlop Island
- Duck Island (joined to shore with infill)
- Dupras Island
- Dutch Island
- Ellis Island
- Evelyn Island
- Farr Island
- Fish Island
- Fraser Island
- Fury Island
- Gibraltar Island
- Green Island
- Gutzman Island
- Hamilton Island
- Haycock Island
- Hazel Island
- Hazelton Island
- Hen Island
- Hog Island
- The Horseshoe (usually submerged by dam but surfaces in low water)
- Houston Island
- Île Chénier
- Île du Chenail
- Île Ecuiel
- Île Ste-Rosalie
- Île Young
- Île Yvette-Naubert
- Irving Island
- Isabel Island (submerged by dam)
- Jamieson Island
- John Joe Island
- Kate Island
- Kedey's Island
- King Edward Island
- Latour Island
- Lemieux Island
- Lillian Island
- Loggershack Peak (submerged by dam, eroded)
- Lorne Island
- Louise Island
- Lower Duck Island
- Lumpy Denommee's Island
- Mackie Island
- Man Island
- Mary Island
- Meadow Island
- Merrill Island
- Metcalf Island
- Miller Island
- Morris Island
- Nichol's Island
- Oak Island
- O'Meara Island
- Parker Island
- Peak Island
- Pearl Island
- Petrie Island
- Pink Island
- Poker Island
- Princess Island
- Ramsey Island
- Randolph Island
- Rempnouix Island
- Riopelle Island
- Rocher Capitaine Island
- Rock Island
- Ruby Islet
- Russell Island (removed?)
- Sack's Island
- Sandbar Island
- Santa Island
- Sawlog Island
- Shoal Island
- Short Turn Island
- Steamer Island
- Snake Island
- Sullivan Island
- Upper Duck Island
- Victoria Island
- Wabewawa Island
- Willson Island
- Windsor Island

== Pigeon Lake ==
- Big Island

== Rice Lake ==
- Cow Island
- East Grape Island
- Grasshopper Island
- Harris Island
- Hickory Island
- Long Island
- Lower Foley Island
- Margaret Island
- Mink Island
- Muskrat island
- Paudaush Island
- Prison Island
- Rack Island
- Sugar Island
- Tic Island
- Upper Foley Island
- West Grape island
- White Island

== Rideau River ==
- Barnes Island
- Beech Island
- Cummings Island
- Green Island
- James Island
- Kilmarnock Island
- Libby Island
- Long Island
- Maple Island
- Nicolls Island
- Porter Island
- Sanders Island

== Lake Rosseau ==
- Florence Island
- Tobin Island
- Wellesley Island

== Lake Scugog ==
- Washburn Island

== Lake Simcoe ==
- Fox Island
- Georgina Island
- Grape Island
- Snake Island
- Strawberry Island
- Thorah Island

== Skootamatta Lake ==
- Big Island

== Lake Saint Clair (North America) ==
- Bassett Island
- Grassy Bend Islands
- St. Anne Island
- Squirrel Island
- Walpole Island

== St. Clair River ==
- Fawn Island
- Stag Island
- Walpole Island

== Saint Lawrence River ==
- Burnt Island
- Pine Island

== Lake of the Woods ==
- Aulneau Island
- Big Island
- Bigsby Island
- Copper Island
- Corkscrew Island
- Hay Island
- LaVérandrye Island
- Scotty Island
- Sultana Island
- Thompson Island
- Wolf Island
- Copeland Island
- Town Island
- Coney Island
- Treaty Island
- Shammis Island
- Crow Rock Island
- Mather Island
- Allie Island
- East Allie Island
- Big Narrows Island
- de Noyon Island
- Bishops Point Island
- Long Point Island

== See also ==
- Islands of the Great Lakes
