= List of islands by name (G) =

This article features a list of islands sorted by their name beginning with the letter G.

== G ==
Island's Name	Island group(s)	Country/Countries
Gabaret	Mississippi River, Illinois	United States
Gabriola	Gulf Islands, British Columbia	Canada
Gaga	Beira Litoral Islands	Portugal
Gaivota	Beira Litoral Islands	Portugal
Gairsay	The North Isles, Orkney Islands	Scotland
Galiano	Gulf Islands, British Columbia	Canada
Galila	Lake Zway	Ethiopia
Gall	Lough Erne	Ireland
Gallinara		Italy
Galt	North Channel, Ontario	Canada
Galveston	Texas	United States
Gansy	Lake Winnipesaukee, New Hampshire	United States
Gapøya		Norway
Garden	Lake Huron, Ontario	Canada
Garden	Lake Nipissing, Ontario	Canada
Garden	Saint Lawrence River, Ontario	Canada
Garden	Western Australia	Australia
Gardner	Louisiana	United States
Garove	Vitu Islands	Papua New Guinea
Garratt	West Lake Ontario	Canada
Gasket	West Lake Ontario	Canada
Gateshead	Nunavut	Canada
Gaua	Banks Islands	Vanuatu
Gavi	Pontine Islands	Italy
Gavdos		Greece
Geada	Algarve Islands	Portugal
Geike	Lake Nipigon, Ontario	Canada
Gelila Zakarias	Lake Tana	Ethiopia
Genovesa	Galápagos Islands	Ecuador
Geomundo		South Korea
George	Falkland Islands	United Kingdom
George	Georgian Bay, Ontario	Canada
Georgetown	Ohio River, Pennsylvania	United States
Georgina	Lake Simcoe, Ontario	Canada
Germ	Persian Gulf	Iran
Geronisos		Cyprus
Gertrude	North Channel, Ontario	Canada
Gerumajima	Kerama Islands part of the Okinawa Islands part of the Ryukyu Islands	Japan
Gęsia Kępa	Oder Lagoon islands	Poland
Ghegheto	Lake Huron, Ontario	Canada
Giannutri	(Tuscany) Tuscan Archipelago	Italy
Giants Tomb	Georgian Bay, Ontario	Canada
Gibbs	South Shetland Islands	Claimed by: Argentine Antarctica, Argentina, Antártica Chilena Province of Chile, and British Antarctic Territory of the United Kingdom
Gibraltar Island	Lake Erie, Ohio	United States
Gidicho	Lake Abaya	Ethiopia
Gigha	Inner Hebrides	Scotland
Giglio	(Tuscany) Tuscan Archipelago	Italy
Gil	British Columbia	Canada
Gilbert	Mississippi River, Missouri	United States
Gilford	British Columbia	Canada
Gimsøya	Lofoten	Norway
Gioura	Sporades	Greece
Giudecca	(Veneto) Venetian Lagoon	Italy
Giske	Møre og Romsdal	Norway
Gisløy		Norway
Glimps Holm	Orkney Islands	Scotland
Glines	Lake Winnipesaukee, New Hampshire	United States
Gloup Holm	Shetland Islands	Scotland
Glykiotissa		Cyprus
Goat	Lough Erne	Ireland
Goat	Whitsunday Islands, Queensland	Australia
Goat	Sydney Harbour	Australia
Goat	Auckland Region	New Zealand
Goat	Otago Harbour	New Zealand
Goat	Niagara Falls New York	United States
Goat	Rhode Island	United States
Goat	Maine	United States
Goat	North Channel, Ontario	Canada
Goat	South Carolina	United States
Gödi-sziget		Hungary
Godøy		Norway
Goeree-Overflakkee	part of the Dutch province South Holland	Netherlands
Gokceada	Aegean Islands	Turkey
Golem Grad	Lake Prespa	North Macedonia
Goli otok	translates as "naked island"	Croatia
La Gomera	Canary Islands	Spain
Goodin	Mississippi River,Minnesota	United States
Goose Island	Great Salt Lake, Utah	United States
Goose	Lake Nipissing, Ontario	Canada
Goose	British Columbia	Canada
Goose	San Juan Islands, Washington	United States
Gooseberry	North Channel, Ontario	Canada
Gorée	Dakar	Senegal
Gorgona		Colombia
Gorgona	(Tuscany) Tuscan Archipelago	Italy
Gossa		Norway
Gotland		Sweden
Gotska Sandön		Sweden
Gough	Tristan da Cunha	(United Kingdom) British overseas territory of Saint Helena, Ascension and Tristan da Cunha
Governor	Thimble Islands, Connecticut	United States
Governor	Georgian Bay, Ontario	Canada
Governors	Lake Winnipesaukee, New Hampshire	United States
Gower	Cumberland River, Tennessee	United States
Gozo	Għawdex, Maltese islands	Malta
Graciosa	Azores	Portugal
Graciosa	Canary Islands	Spain
Graemsay	Orkney Islands	Scotland
Graham	Queen Elizabeth Islands, Nunavut	Canada
Graham	Haida Gwaii, British Columbia	Canada
Gramatal Island	Beira Litoral Islands	Portugal
Gran Canaria	Canary Islands	Spain
Granary	Islands of Gdańsk	Poland
Grand Cayman	Cayman Islands	United Kingdom
Grand	Jason Islands of the Falkland Islands	United Kingdom
Grand	Balsam Lake, Ontario	Canada
Grand	Louisiana	United States
Grand	Niagara River, New York	United States
Grand	Lake Champlain, Vermont	United States
Grand Manan	New Brunswick	Canada
Grand Terre	Louisiana	United States
Grande Comore	Comoros	Comoros
Grande-Terre	Guadeloupe, Lesser Antilles	France
Grape	Lake Simcoe, Ontario	Canada
Gräsö		Sweden
Gravelly	Lough Erne	Ireland
Gravine	Mobile Bay, Alabama	United States
Gray	Georgian Bay, Ontario	Canada
Great Blasket	Blasket Islands	Ireland
Great Britain		United Kingdom
Great	Falkland Islands	United Kingdom
Great	Cork Harbour	Ireland
Great	Massachusetts	United States
Great Exuma	Bahama Islands	Bahamas
Great La Cloche	North Channel, Ontario	Canada
Great Manitou	Lake Nipissing, Ontario	Canada
Great Nicobar	Nicobar Islands	India
Greater Mount Changtu	Zhoushan Archipelago	China
Greater Mount Yang	Zhoushan Archipelago	China
Greater Tunbs	Persian Gulf	Iran
Green	Queensland	Australia
Green	New South Wales	Australia
Green	Jersey, Channel Islands	(United Kingdom) Crown dependency
Green	Isles of Scilly	United Kingdom
Green	Poole Harbour	United Kingdom
Green	Rideau River, Ontario	Canada
Green	Severn Sound, Ontario	Canada
Greene	Ottawa River, Ontario	Canada
Green	Hong Kong	China
Green	Taitung County	Republic of China
Green	Red Sea	Egypt
Greene	Lake Huron, Ontario	Canada
Greene	Lake Ontario, Ontario	Canada
Greenisland	Northern Ireland	United Kingdom
Greenland		Denmark
Greenspond	Newfoundland and Labrador	Canada
Greenwich	South Shetland Islands	Claimed by: Argentine Antarctica,Argentina, Antártica Chilena Province of Chile, and British Antarctic Territory of the United Kingdom
Grenadier	Thousand Islands New York	United States
Grenadier	Saint Lawrence River Ontario	Canada
Greifswalder Oie		Germany
Grgur		Croatia
Gribbell	British Columbia	Canada
Griffith	Queen Elizabeth Islands, Nunavut	Canada
Griffith	Windmill Islands	Antarctica
Griffith	Georgian Bay, Ontario	Canada
Grimes	Mississippi River, Illinois	United States
Grímsey		Iceland
Grindstone	Thousand Islands (Saint Lawrence River), New York	United States
Grindstone	Big Rideau Lake, Ontario	Canada
Grip		Norway
Gris Bourbe	Louisiana	United States
Grisvågøy		Norway
Gröde-Appelland	North Frisian Islands	Germany
Groix	Morbihan, Bretagne	France
Grøtøy		Norway
Grunay	Out Skerries, Shetland Islands	Scotland
Gruney	Shetland Islands	Scotland
Grytøy	Vesterålen	Norway
Guam		United States
Guana Key	Island Territory of Sint Maarten, Netherlands Antilles	Kingdom of the Netherlands
Guemes	San Juan Islands, Washington	United States
Guernsey	Guernsey, Channel Islands	(United Kingdom) Crown dependency
Gull	Lake Nipissing, Ontario	Canada
Gull	Lake Ontario, Ontario	Canada
Gull	Lake Mead, Nevada	United States
Gunnison	Great Salt Lake, Utah	United States
Gurskøy		Norway
Gyali	Dodecanese	Greece
Gyaros	Cyclades	Greece

== See also ==
- List of islands (by country)
- List of islands by area
- List of islands by population
- List of islands by highest point
