= Georgian Bay Islands National Park =

National park in Ontario, Canada

- Parc national des Îles-de-la-Baie-Georgienne
- IUCN category II (national park)
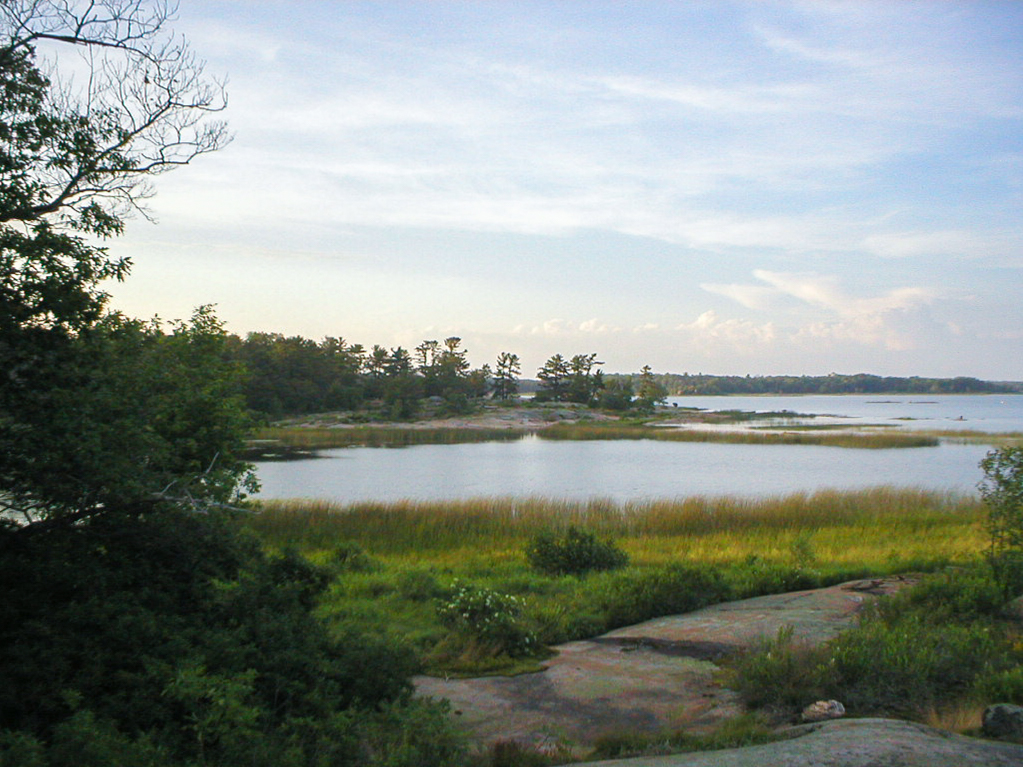
- Cedar Springs, Beausoleil Island

- Location within Canada Location within Southern Ontario
- Interactive map of Georgian Bay Islands National Park
- Location: Thirty Thousand Islands, Ontario, Canada
- Nearest city: Midland, Ontario
- Coordinates: 44°52′40″N 79°52′29″W
- Area: 13.5 km^{2} (5.2 sq mi)
- Established: 1929
- Visitors: 27,482 (in 2022–23)
- Governing body: Parks Canada
- Website: parks.canada.ca/pn-np/on/georg

Georgian Bay Islands National Park (established 1929) consists of 63 small islands or parts of islands in Georgian Bay, near Port Severn, Ontario. The total park area is approximately 13.5 km^{2} (5.2 sq mi). Prior to the creation of Fathom Five National Marine Park, Flowerpot Island was also a part of the park.

The islands blend the exposed rocks and pines of the Canadian Shield with the hardwood forests found further south. The park can only be reached by boat and all of the islands are open to the public. Limited camping and docking facilities, trails and cabins are only available on the largest island, Beausoleil Island.

It is part of the Georgian Bay Littoral Biosphere Reserve.

== Wildlife ==
It is home to mammalian species such as white-tailed deer, moose, black bear, coyote, eastern wolf, lynx, bobcat, porcupine, raccoon, beaver, red and grey fox species, chipmunk, and red squirrel. This park also provides habitat for 33 species of reptiles and amphibians, including the five lined skink, eastern hognose snake, the eastern fox snake, and the threatened eastern Massasauga rattlesnake. Some of the more isolated islands provide nesting areas for colonies of gulls and terns.

== Beausoleil Island ==
Beausoleil Island is the largest island in the park and it offers island tent camping, overnight and day docking, heritage education programs, and hiking trails. Wheelchair accessible sites and reserved campsites are also available at the Cedar Spring campground on Beausoleil Island.

== See also ==
- National Parks of Canada
- List of National Parks of Canada
