= Partridge (disambiguation) =

A partridge is an Old World bird in the pheasant family.

Partridge may also refer to:

== Arts and entertainment ==
- Alan Partridge, fictional British television and radio presenter
- The Partridge Family, American TV musical-sitcom
- Partridges (painting), a painting by Józef Chełmoński

== Places ==
- Partridge, Kansas, United States
- Partridge Island (disambiguation), multiple locations
- John Partridge House, historic house in Millis, Massachusetts

== Plants ==
- Partridge Berry, Mitchella repens, wildflower growing in the eastern United States
- Partridge Pea, Chamaecrista fasciculata, wildflower growing in the eastern United States

== Other uses ==
- Partridge (surname), including a list of people with the name
- Partridges (retailer), English specialty grocer
- Partridge Jewellers, New Zealand luxury jewellery retailer
- 19810 Partridge, main-belt asteroid
- HMS Partridge, Royal Navy ships which have borne this name
- USS Partridge, US Navy ships which have borne this name

== See also ==
- Partridge River (disambiguation)
