= List of islands of Alabama =

This is a list of islands in the U.S. state of Alabama.

- Aikin Island
- Alligator Island
- Barton Island
- Bee Tree Island - historical
- Bell Island
- Bellefonte Island
- Big Island - Baldwin County
- Big Island - Mobile County
- Big Island - historical - Chilton County
- Big Island - historical - Tuscaloosa County
- Big Rock
- Big Rock Island
- Bilbo Island
- Blakeley Island
- Brush Creek Island - historical
- Buck Island - Colbert County
- Buck Island - Limestone County
- Buck Island - Mount Carmel, Marshall County
- Buck Island - historical - Columbus City, Marshall County
- Buckmans Island
- Buffalo Island
- Buffingtons Island
- Bullocks Islands
- Burman Island
- Buzzard Island - Montgomery County
- Buzzard Island - Shelby County
- Byrams Island
- Caddell Island
- Canal Island
- Cat Island
- Cedar Island - Mobile County
- Cedar Island - historical - Coosa County
- Cedar Island - Lauderdale County
- Chigger Island - historical
- Colbert Island - historical
- Colgins Island - historical
- Colvins Island
- Cooper Island
- Copeland Island
- Corn Island - historical
- Cox Island - historical
- Crawfords Island - historical
- Crow Creek Island
- Crusoe Island - historical
- Curry Island
- Isle aux Dames
- Dans Island
- Dauphin Island
- Deadlake Island
- Denson Island - historical
- Drake Island
- Dutch Island
- Eagle Island - historical
- Eagle Nest
- Edith Hammock
- Elliott Island
- Esslinger Island
- Falling Rock
- Fennel Island - historical
- Fig Tree Island
- Finley Island
- Fisher Island
- Five Acre Island - historical
- Flint Creek Island
- Flint River Towhead - historical
- Forty Acres Island - historical
- Foshee Islands
- Gaillard Island
- Gallus Island
- Gardiner Island
- Gibson Towhead
- Gilchrist Island - Coosa County
- Gilchrist Island - historical - Lawrence County
- Ginhouse Island
- Goat Island - Coosa County
- Goat Island - Cullman County
- Goat Island - Marshall County
- Goat Island - Mobile County
- Goat Island - Shelby County
- Goat Towhead
- Godfreys Island
- Geese Island
- Goose Pond Island
- Gourd Island - historical
- Grande Batture Islands
- Grass Island
- Gravine Island
- Grissom Island
- Gull Island
- Gum Island
- Gun Island
- Haines Island
- Hales Island - historical
- Harmons Island
- Harrys Island - historical
- Isle aux Herbes
- Hillmans Island - historical
- Hobbs Island - Madison County
- Hobbs Island - Wilcox County
- Hodge Island
- Hog Island - Cherokee County
- Hog Island - historical - Colbert County
- Hollingers Island
- Houses Island
- Houstons Island - historical
- Howard Island - historical
- Hurricane Island
- Jacks Island - historical
- Jackson Island
- Jim Burns Island
- Jones Field
- Keeling Island
- Kings Island - historical
- Knight Island - historical
- Knowles Island
- Kogers Island
- Kogers Rock - historical
- Lady Island
- Larkins Towhead - historical
- Larry Island
- Lenhart Island
- Little Bay Island
- Little Buck Island - historical
- Little Dauphin Island
- Little Island
- Little Peach Island - historical
- Little Rock Island
- Little Sand Island
- Littles Island - historical
- Long Island - Jackson County
- Long Island - Mobile County
- Manacks Island - historical
- Mariner Island
- Marsh Island - Grand Bay, Mobile County
- Marsh Island - Heron Bay, Mobile County
- Mason Island - Limestone County
- Mason Island - historical - Talladega County
- McCoys Island - historical
- McDuffie Island
- McKee Island - historical
- Merkl Island
- Mon Louis Island - Mobile County
- Mound Island
- Mud Island
- Mule Island
- The Negrohead - historical
- Noman Towhead
- Noxubee Island
- Ogletree Island
- Ohio Island - historical
- Ono Island
- Parker Island
- Patton Island
- Peach Island
- Pelican Island
- Perdido Key
- Peters Island
- Pine Island - historical
- Pinto Island
- Pippin Towhead
- Polk Island - historical
- Price Island
- Prince Island
- Pruetts Island
- Rabbit Island
- Raccoon Island
- Real Island
- Resting Island - historical
- Richardson Island
- Robbers Island
- Robertsons Island - historical
- Robinson Island - Orange Beach, Baldwin County
- Robinson Island - Stiggins Lake, Baldwin County
- Rock Garden
- Rock Island - historical
- Round Island - Clarke County
- Round Island - Mobile County
- Russell Island
- Sam Acre Island
- Sand Island - historical
- Sedge Grass Island - historical
- Sevenmile Island
- Sheep Island - historical
- Shiny Rock
- Sipsey Island - historical
- Smith Island - Choctaw County
- Smith Island - Monroe County
- Smith Island - Shelby County
- Snake Island
- South Island
- South Rigolets Island
- State Line Island
- Steamboat Island - historical
- Steins Island
- Strawberry Island
- Streets Island
- Sweetgum Island - historical
- Tait Island
- Ten Islands - historical
- Terrapin Island
- Thompsons Island - historical
- Tick Island - historical
- Traylor Island
- Treasure Island
- Turkey Chute Island - historical
- Turtleback Island
- Twelvemile Island
- Twelvemile Rock
- Vienna Island - historical
- Walker Island - Baldwin County
- Walker Island - historical - Colbert County
- Ware Island
- Waterloo Island - historical
- Weaver Island
- Whites Island
- Wildmans Island
- Woods Island - St. Clair County
- Woods Island - Tallapoosa County
- Woody's Island
- Wortham Mill Island
- Youngs Island - Dadeville, Tallapoosa County
- Youngs Island - Our Town, Tallapoosa County
