= Little Partridge River =

Little Partridge River may refer to:

Canada

- Little Partridge River (Thlewiaza River) in Manitoba and Nunavut
- Little Partridge River (Ontario), in Cochrane District, Ontario

United States

- Little Partridge River, a tributary of the Partridge River (Crow Wing River) in Minnesota

== See also ==
- Partridge River (disambiguation)
