= Scotch Cap =

Scotch cap may refer to:

- Tam o' Shanter (cap), a hat
- Rubus occidentalis, Black raspberry
- Scotch Cap Light, a lighthouse

== See also ==
- Scotch bonnet (disambiguation)
