= Partridge River =

Partridge River may refer to:

Canada

- Partridge River (Canada), a river in the headwaters of the Yukon River in British Columbia and Yukon
- Partridge River (Ontario)

United States

- Minnesota
  - Partridge River (Crow Wing River), a tributary of the Crow Wing River
  - Partridge River (St. Louis River), a tributary of the St. Louis River

== See also ==
- Little Partridge River (disambiguation)
- Partridge (disambiguation)
