= Scotch bonnet (disambiguation) =

The scotch bonnet is a variety of chili pepper.

Scotch bonnet may also refer to:

- Scotch bonnet (mushroom), a mushroom also known as the fairy ring mushroom
- Scotch bonnet (sea snail), a sea snail and the official state shell of North Carolina
- Scotch Bonnet Island, a one hectare island in Lake Ontario
- Scotch Bonnet Mountain, a mountain in Montana, US
- Scotch Bonnet Records, a Scottish record label
- Scotch Bonnet Ridge, a geologic feature in Canada and the United States, near Scotch Bonnet Island

== See also ==
- Tam o' shanter (cap), after which the above are named
