= Partridge Island =

Partridge Island may refer to:

- Partridge Island, Bermuda
- Partridge Island (Saint John County), an island in New Brunswick, Canada
- Partridge Island (Nova Scotia), peninsula in Canada
- Partridge Island (Ontario), uninhabited island in Canada
- Partridge Island (Tasmania), island in Australia
- Partridge Island (New York), island in United States
