= Limestone Islands =

Islands in Georgian Bay, Ontario

Coordinates: 45.3895°N 80.5318°W

The Limestone Islands are two islands, North Limestone Island and South Limestone Island, in Georgian Bay, Ontario, Canada, 14 miles (23 km) west of Parry Sound.

They are unusual islands in many respects, for their geography is quite different from that of the other 30,000 islands in Georgian Bay. Most of the islands in Georgian Bay are made of granitic bedrock, whereas the Limestone Islands are made, as their name reflects, completely of limestone. The South Island has a flat terrain inhabited by low vegetation, which is reportedly much more friendly that its sister island, the North Limestone, which is infested with poison ivy.

South Limestone Island is known for being host to thousands of birds, the majority of which consist of seagulls and common terns. The Limestone Islands are a nature reserve under the auspices of Ontario Parks.
