= True North II =

Glass-bottom tour boat that sank off Tobermory, Ontario, Canada

Coordinates: 45.2825°N 81.6521°W

True North II was a small, 10.6 metre glass-bottom tour boat that sank on June 16, 2000, in 15 metres (49 ft) of water off of Tobermory, Ontario, Canada, in Georgian Bay, while transporting a class of 13 students from an overnight field trip to Flowerpot Island back to the mainland. Two of the students, 12-year-olds Wade Simmons and Henrike Foerster, were killed in the sinking. The ship sank suddenly in rain and nearly gale-force winds, causing the parents of the deceased to question the captain's decision to travel in such bad weather. The captain ignored a Small craft advisory warning about the relatively heavy seas and high winds prior to leaving the dock (1m waves and 15-25 knot winds), although it was later reported that the vessel experienced winds of 30 knots.

The remaining 18 people on board (11 of whom were classmates of the victims) managed to survive by swimming approximately 200 metres to shore. None of the passengers were wearing lifejackets, as it was not officially required by law at the time to don them unless the captain ordered a ship evacuation. This rule came under some scrutiny after the accident.

An inquest into the events was in fact later launched and ended in the jury calling for safer school field trips and boating standards in Ontario. One issue that was pointed out was that there were 22 lifejackets, which were stored in garbage bags, on board, but that only two were child-sized despite the fact that there were 13 children on board. The sinking of the True North II on a whole, however, was ruled to be an accident.
