= White Cloud Island =

Island in Ontario, Canada

Coordinates: 44.8351°N 80.9754°W

White Cloud Island is an island in Georgian Bay, in the province of Ontario, Canada. It is one of three islands in Colpoys Bay, and is located to the northeast of Wiarton and north of Owen Sound. The other two islands in Colpoys Bay are Griffith Island and Hay Island.
