= Nicholson Island (Lake Ontario) =

Island in Prince Edward County, Ontario, Canada

Coordinates: 43.917°N 77.521°W

Nicholson Island is a small island in Lake Ontario about 3 kilometres (1.9 mi) west of Prince Edward County, Ontario. It is one of the islands and shoals in the Scotch Bonnet Ridge.

In 1834 Nicholson Island was under consideration as the site of a lighthouse. In 1844 nearby Scotch Bonnet Island was chosen as the site of a lighthouse. Small, low Scotch Bonnet Island's lighthouse was not fit for human occupancy during the winter, so a lighthouse keeper's house was built on Nicholson Island in 1866.

The island is currently private property, and is used as a private game reserve.
