= Cabot Head =

Coordinates: 45°14′42″N 81°17′32″W

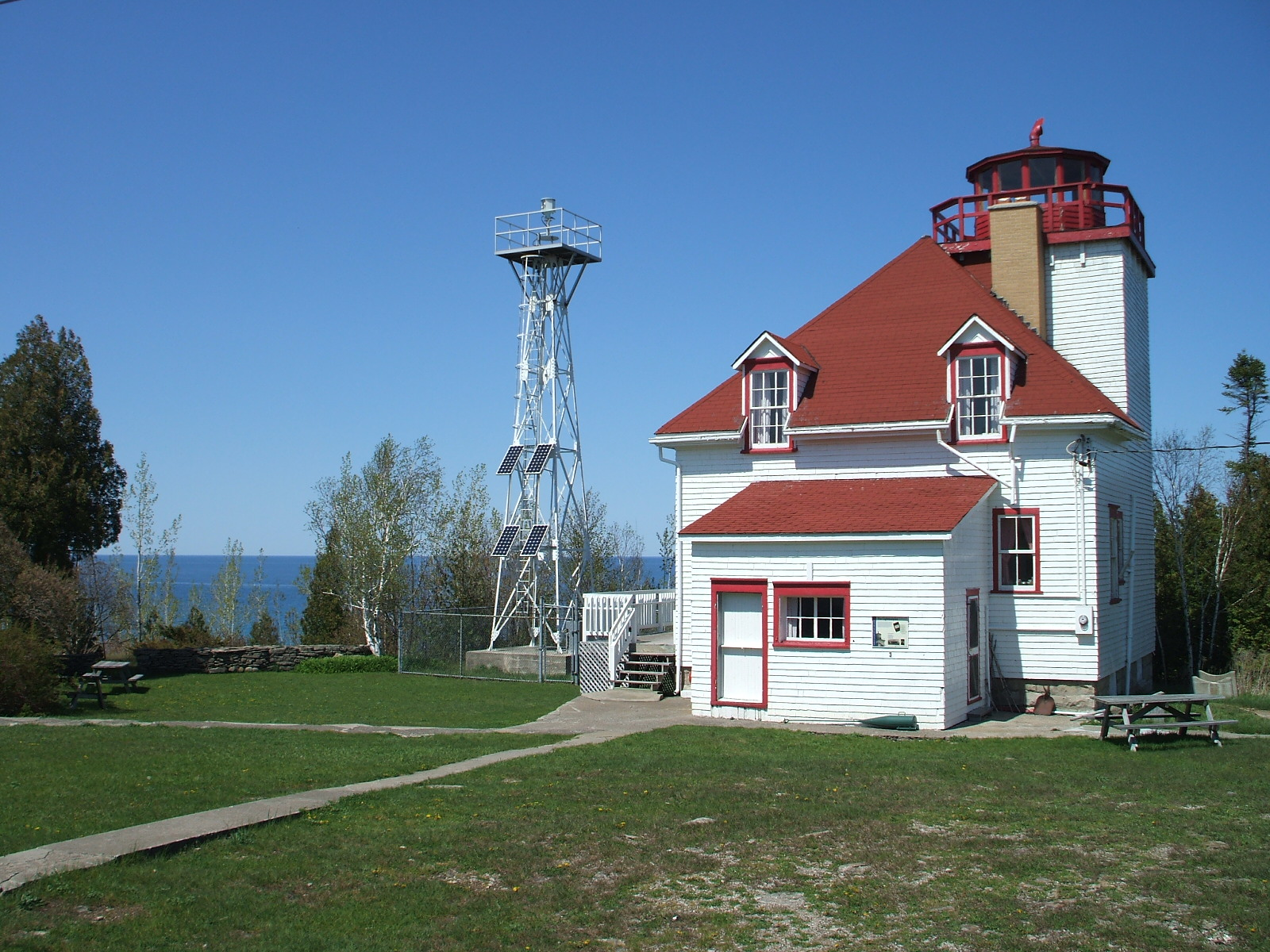
Light station at Cabot Head

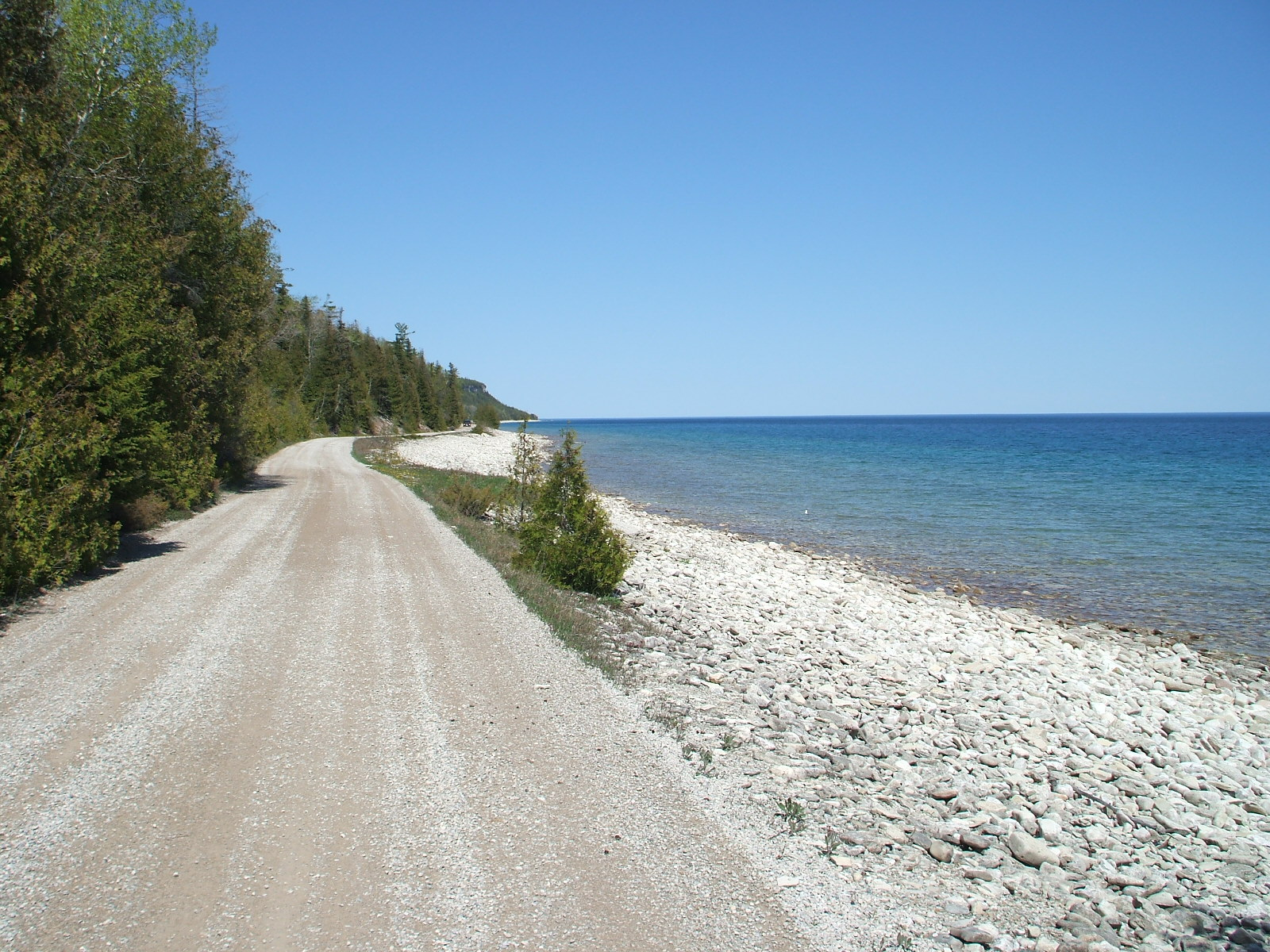
Georgian Bay at Cabot Head

Cabot Head is a point of land on the northeast tip of the Bruce Peninsula in the Canadian province of Ontario. The Bruce Peninsula separates Georgian Bay from the rest of Lake Huron. Cabot Head is so named in honor of the explorer John Cabot, although Cabot never explored the Great Lakes. The name of the area was bestowed by John Graves Simcoe (1752-1806).

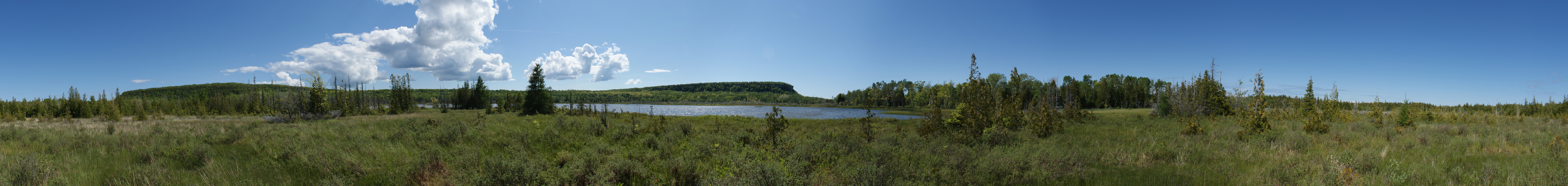
A panoramic photograph of a fen at Cabot Head Provincial Nature Preserve

Cabot Head Lighthouse sits 80 feet above the waterline of Georgian Bay. Originally built in 1896, the lighthouse is located on the eastern shore of Wingfield Basin Provincial Nature Reserve, marking a popular inlet for pleasure craft during harsh weather In 1968 the original tower and range light were demolished and replaced with an automated light. Over the next 15 years, The Friends of Cabot Head Lighthouse Organization restored the lighthouse. Today it serves as a museum, and tourists are encouraged to explore the paths throughout the surrounding Nature Reserve.
