= Beausoleil Island =

Island in Muskoka District, Ontario, Canada

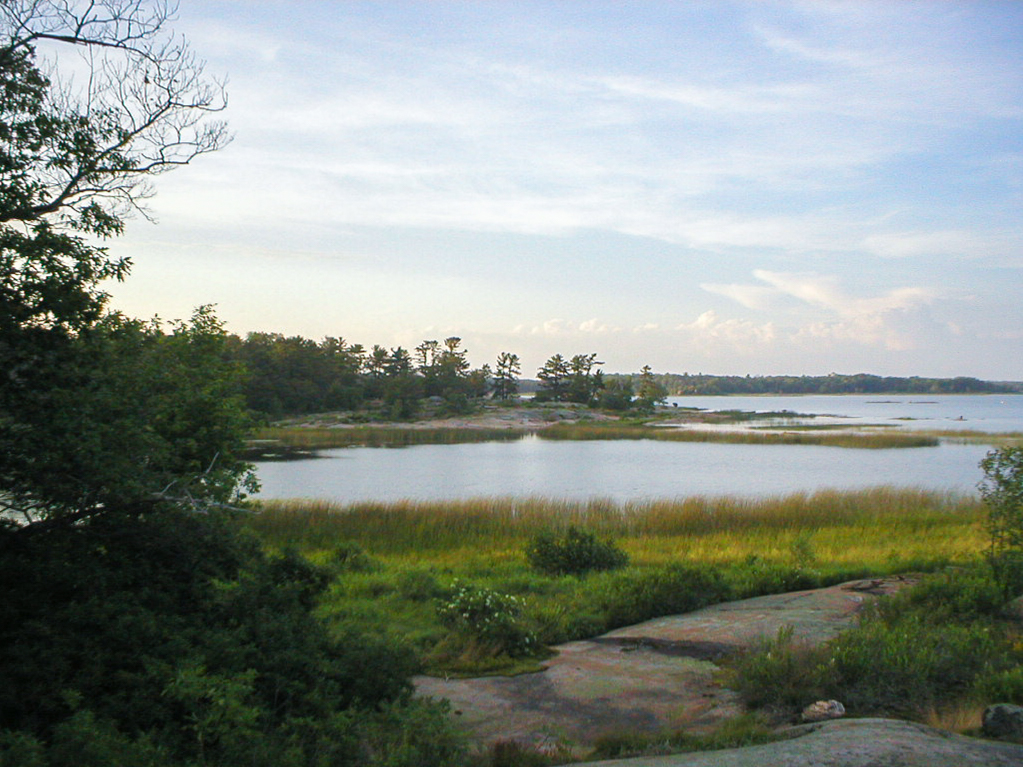
- The waters between Finger Point and Thumb Point near Cedar Springs, Beausoleil Island

- Location of the island in Southern Ontario

Geography
- Location: Georgian Bay
- Coordinates: 44°52′12″N 79°52′06″W
- Archipelago: Thirty Thousand Islands
- Length: 8 km (5 mi)

Administration
- Canada
- Province: Ontario
- District Municipality: District Municipality of Muskoka
- Municipality: Georgian Bay

Additional information
- Time zone: Eastern Time Zone (UTC-5)
  - Summer (DST): Eastern Time Zone (UTC-4)

Beausoleil Island; Île Beausoleil; is an 8-kilometre (5.0 mi) long island in the municipality of Georgian Bay, District Municipality of Muskoka in Central Ontario, Canada. The island is named after Louis Beausoleil, an American born Metis settler whose 1819 homestead stood at the island's southern tip. The name of the island in the Wyandot/Huron/Wendat language is Skiondechiara which means "The land to appear floating afar". The name of the island in the Anishinaabemowin language is variously Pamedenagog, Baamidoonegog or Epenmindaagoog meaning “rocky place floating about the mouth of a river”. In the early 19th century the island was called Prince William Henry Island.

Located in the Thirty Thousand Islands in Georgian Bay on Lake Huron, it is the largest island in Georgian Bay Islands National Park and is the only place in the park where camping is allowed. Beausoleil Island is also part of the Georgian Bay Littoral (also called the Georgian Bay Biosphere Reserve) UNESCO Biosphere reserve.

== Natural history ==
Beausoleil Island is a refuge for the eastern massasauga rattlesnake, the only venomous snake in Ontario. On sunny days, Georgian Bay's cobalt waters form a striking counterpart to the light blue of the sky, the pinkish rocks of the Canadian Shield, and the dark green of the park's famous windswept pines. The Fairy Lake and Cambrian Trails, in the north of the island, offer especially striking views of these natural features.

Northern Beausoleil Island's characteristic bedrock and wetland environment is rich in many species and is a major breeding area for amphibians, turtles and snakes. Southern Beausoleil Island's hardwood and mixed forests are good representations of regional woodland communities.

== History ==
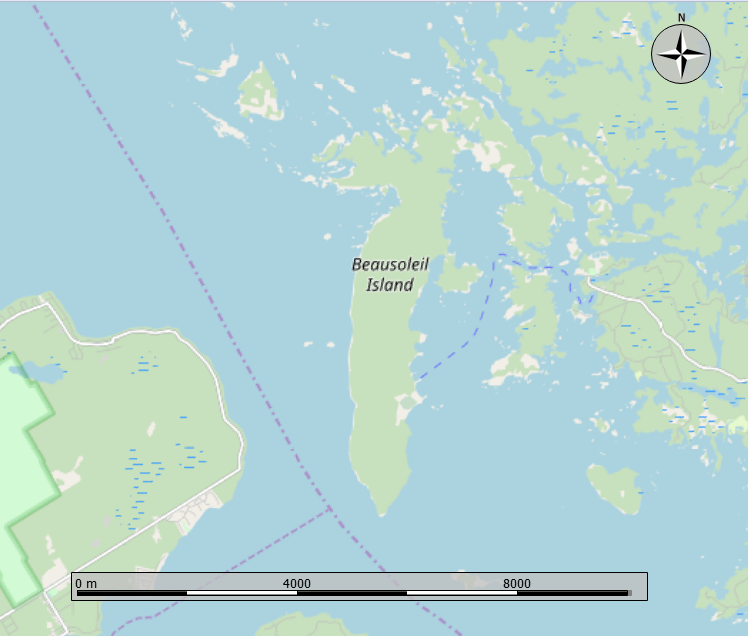
Map of the island.

Artifacts from as far back as the Middle Archaic period, 7,000 years ago, have been found, such as an Otter Creek projectile made from Onondaga chert. The remains of ancient pottery, tools, and hunting implements that have been found on Beausoleil have enabled archaeologists to determine that the island was, in all probability, used as a summer camp by early hunting and gathering cultures. These include primarily a Middle Woodland site occupied by the Point Peninsula and Saugeen groups (2,400-1,300 years ago), and the Algonkian speaking Odawa (or Ottawa) of the Late Woodland Period (600–400 years ago). Several other cultures have also left evidence of their occupation on the island.

Descendants of the Chippewas of Lake Huron and Lake Simcoe settled on Beausoleil Island in 1842. The soil on the island proved to be unsuitable for cultivation, so the band moved to the Christian Islands which had been set aside as a reserve in the 1850s. On June 5, 1856, Beausoleil and all of the other islands in Georgian Bay, except the Christian Islands, were surrendered or sold to the British Crown. The Chippewa residents of Christian Islands still identify themselves as the Beausoleil First Nation. The island was designated a National Historic Site of Canada in 2011.

== Summer Camps ==
Beausoleil Island has played a significant role in the birth of residential camping in Ontario. Beausoleil Island has been the home of 5 residential children's summer camps, all located on land leased from Parks Canada. These camps have included Camp Wabanaki (Kitchener-Waterloo YMCA, 1940–1970), Camp Beausoleil (Toronto YMCA, 1931–1981) and Camp Manitimono (Calvary Baptist Church, 1933–1994), with two YMCA Camps remaining on the island: YMCA Camp Kitchikewana (YMCA of Simcoe Muskoka) founded by the Midland YMCA in 1919 and YMCA Camp Queen Elizabeth (YMCA of Western Ontario) originally the Sea Cadet Camp Queen Elizabeth (Royal Canadian Navy) established in 1942. Former staffers at these last two camps went on to become great leaders in the Canadian camping movement: Winston "Smitty" Smith, Jack Pearse, Ron and Mickey Johnstone among them. Camp Kitchikewana is one of the oldest camps in Ontario.

== Recreation ==
Beausoleil Island offers tent and cabin camping, overnight and day docking, heritage education programs, and hiking trails. Wheelchair accessible sites and reserved campsites are also available at the Cedar Spring campground.

== See also ==
- List of islands of Ontario
