= Partridge Lake (Partridge River) =

Lake in Cochrane District, Ontario, Canada

- Location in Ontario
- Location: Cochrane District, Ontario
- Coordinates: 50°24′05″N 80°18′48″W
- Part of: James Bay drainage basin
- Primary outflows: Partridge River
- Basin countries: Canada
- Max. length: 4.3 kilometres (2.7 mi)
- Max. width: 1.1 kilometres (0.68 mi)
- Surface elevation: 266 metres (873 ft)

Partridge Lake is a lake in Cochrane District in Northeastern Ontario, Canada. It is the source of the Partridge River from an outflow at middle of the east side of the lake; the Partridge River flows to James Bay. There are five unnamed inflows to the lake.

== See also ==
- List of lakes in Ontario
