= Partridges (retailer) =

London independent retailer

Coordinates: 51.4907°N 0.1605°W

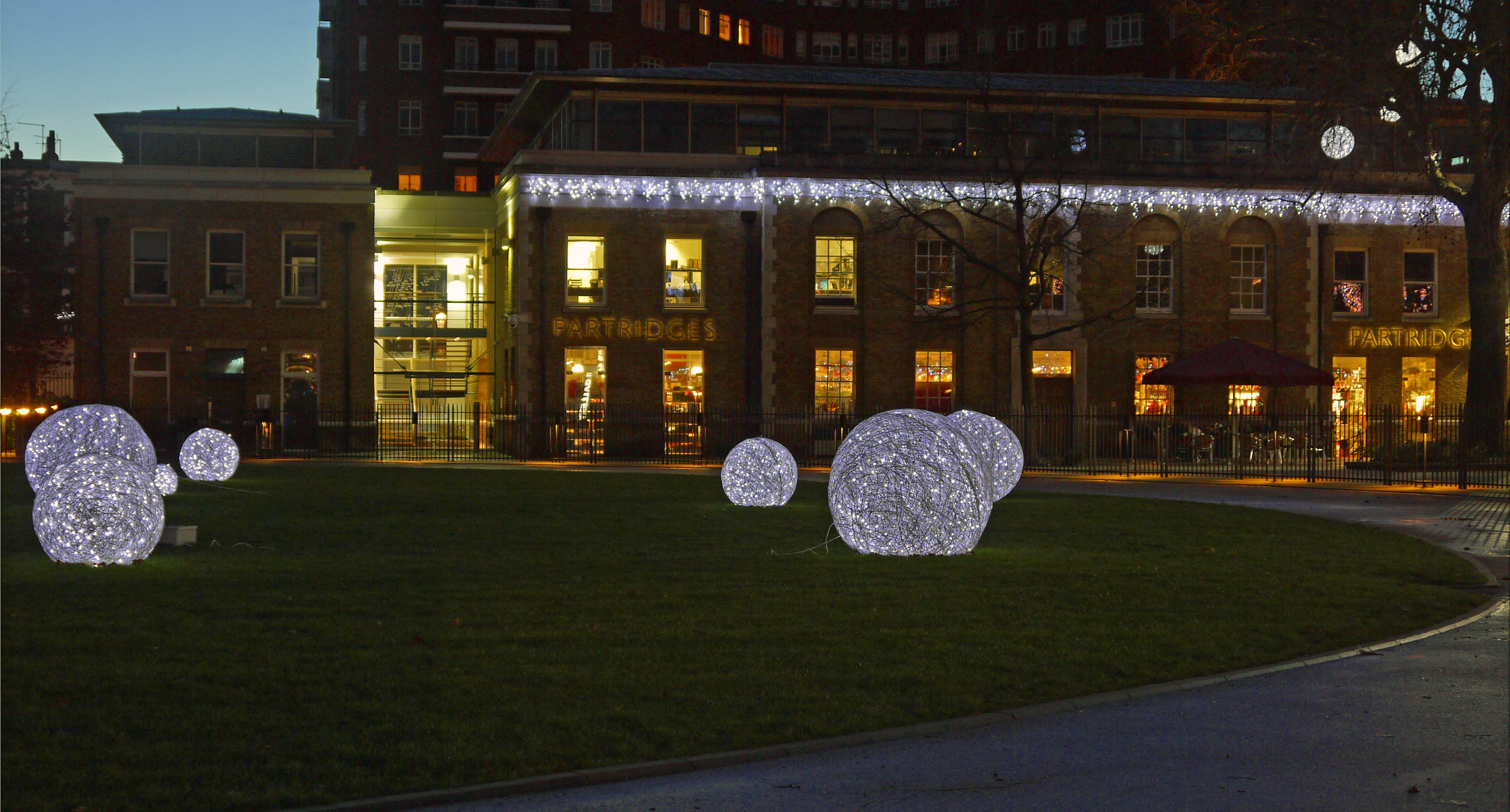
Partridges seen with Christmas decorations

Partridges was an independent retailer in Chelsea, London that was known for selling specialty items. It closed in February 2025.

Partridges was launched in 1972 by Sir Richard Shepherd and originally located on Sloane Street. It received a Royal Warrant from Elizabeth II in 1994 and moved to Queripel House in 2004. Other than the monarch, Partridges was known to be popular among wealthy residents of Chelsea and London, being described as the "country's poshest grocer".

Partridges also operated a popular weekly food market in Duke of York Square which continues to operate. Its closure was described as one commentator as being emblematic of the death of the high street.

A second Partridges location was opened in 1998 on Gloucester Road and remains open.
