= Isle of Man (Cataraqui River) =

- Location within Ontario

Geography
- Location: Frontenac County, Ontario
- Coordinates: 44°19′27″N 76°25′2″W

Administration
- Canada

Isle of Man is an island located in Cataraqui River, in Frontenac County, Ontario, Canada. It is actually not an island per se, because it has a land link to the eastern side of the river. It is located northeast of Kingston.

== See also ==
- List of islands of Ontario
