= Partridge River (Ontario) =

- Location of the mouth of the Partridge River in Ontario

Location
- Country: Canada
- Province: Ontario
- Region: Northeastern Ontario
- District: Cochrane

Physical characteristics
- Source: Partridge Lake
  - coordinates: 50°24′05″N 80°18′24″W
  - elevation: 266 m (873 ft)
- Mouth: James Bay
  - coordinates: 51°18′35″N 80°17′32″W
  - elevation: 0 m (0 ft)

Basin features
- River system: James Bay drainage basin
- Tributaries
  - right: Little Partridge River

The Partridge River is a river in northern Cochrane District in Northeastern Ontario, Canada. It is a tributary of James Bay situated in between the much larger drainage basins of the Moose River to the west and the Harricana River to the east.

== Course ==
The river begins at Partridge Lake, adjacent to the much larger Kesagami Lake on the Kesagami River, part of Harricana River drainage basin. It exits the lake at the east and turns north, then jogs west through the Kanatotik Rapids before again heading north and passing around Blackbear Island. It continues north around Kaskagonagau Island and Mistikopileo Island, takes in the right tributary Little Partridge River, and reaches its mouth at James Bay.

== Tributaries ==
- Little Partridge River (right)
- Paskeyau Creek (right)
- Marberg Creek (right)
- Malastikweyau Creek (left)
- Glaister Creek (right)

== See also ==
- List of rivers of Ontario

== Sources ==
- Map 15 (PDF) (Map). 1 : 1,600,000. Official road map of Ontario. Ministry of Transportation of Ontario. 2014.
- Restructured municipalities - Ontario map #3 (Map). Restructuring Maps of Ontario. Ontario Ministry of Municipal Affairs and Housing. 2006. Archived from the original on 2014-04-10.
