= Thirty Thousand Islands =

Freshwater archipelago in Ontario, Canada

Coordinates: 45°22′22″N 80°25′03″W

The Thirty Thousand Islands are the world's largest freshwater archipelago, and are located mainly along the east side of Georgian Bay, part of the Great Lakes, in Ontario, Canada.

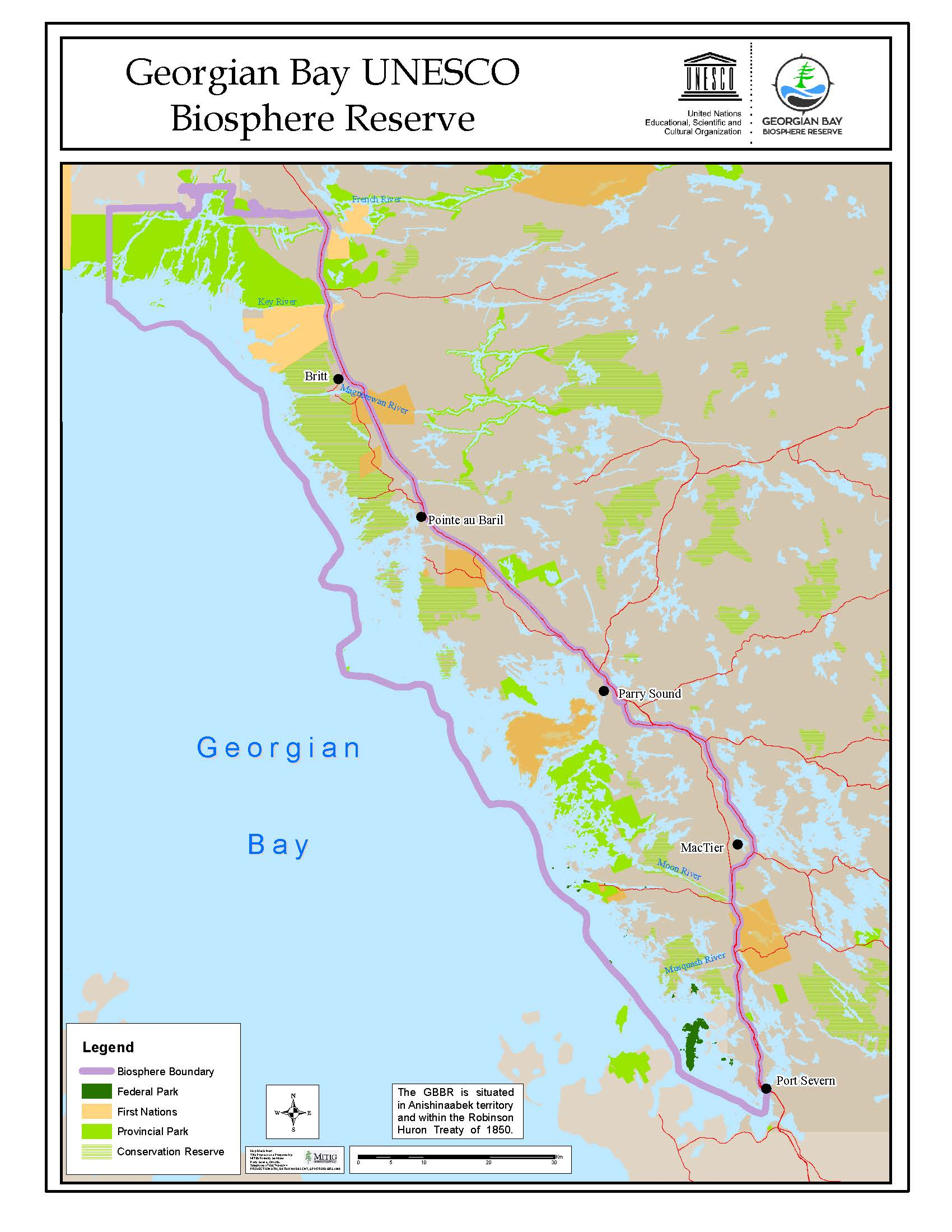
Biosphere map of Georgian Bay.

UNESCO designated the area in 2004 as the Georgian Bay Littoral (also called the Georgian Bay Biosphere Reserve). It is an area of 347,000 hectares (860,000 acres) that stretches 200 kilometres (120 mi) along the eastern coast from Port Severn to the French River.

Though the Thirty Thousand Islands has no formal geographical boundaries, its general location runs from Beausoleil Island in the south to the French River Provincial Park in the north. Just a few kilometres west of Beausoleil Island are four more islands – Giants Tomb Island, Hope Island, Beckwith Island, and Christian Island. To the west of French River Provincial Park are many more islands, including Manitoulin Island, the largest freshwater lake island in the world.

== Group of Seven ==
Many of the Group of Seven landscape paintings feature the Georgian Bay Shoreline and the adjacent windswept islands with their distinctive trees and large boulders, which are characteristic features of the Canadian Shield. Franklin Carmichael, A.Y. Jackson, Arthur Lismer, Frederick Varley, A.J. Casson and Tom Thomson all painted extensively along Georgian Bay. At that time, they came by train as the road to Killarney, Ontario would not be built until four decades later.

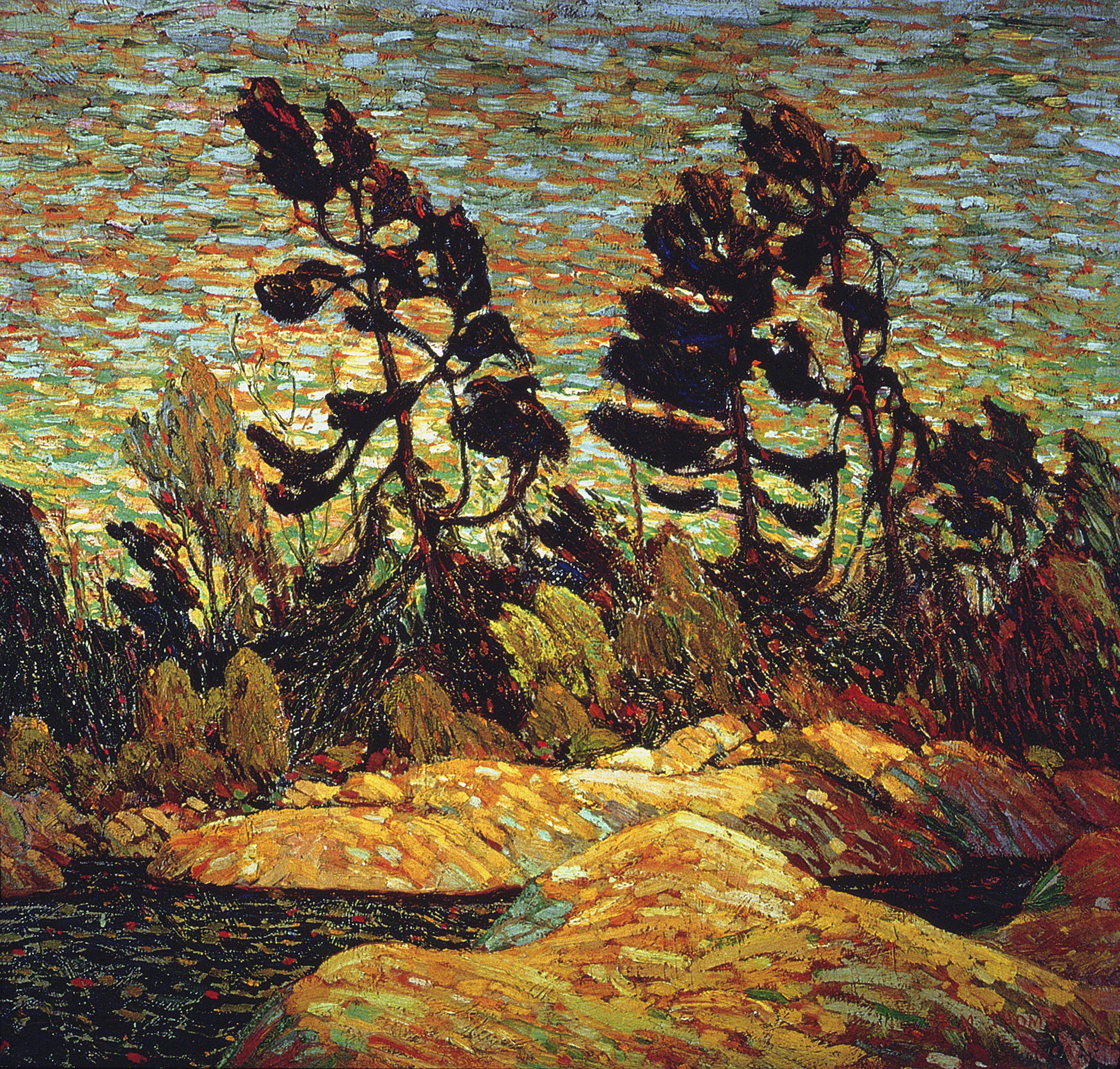
Tom Thomson – Summer Shore, Georgian Bay
