= Death of the high street =

Phrase suggesting decline of high street shopping

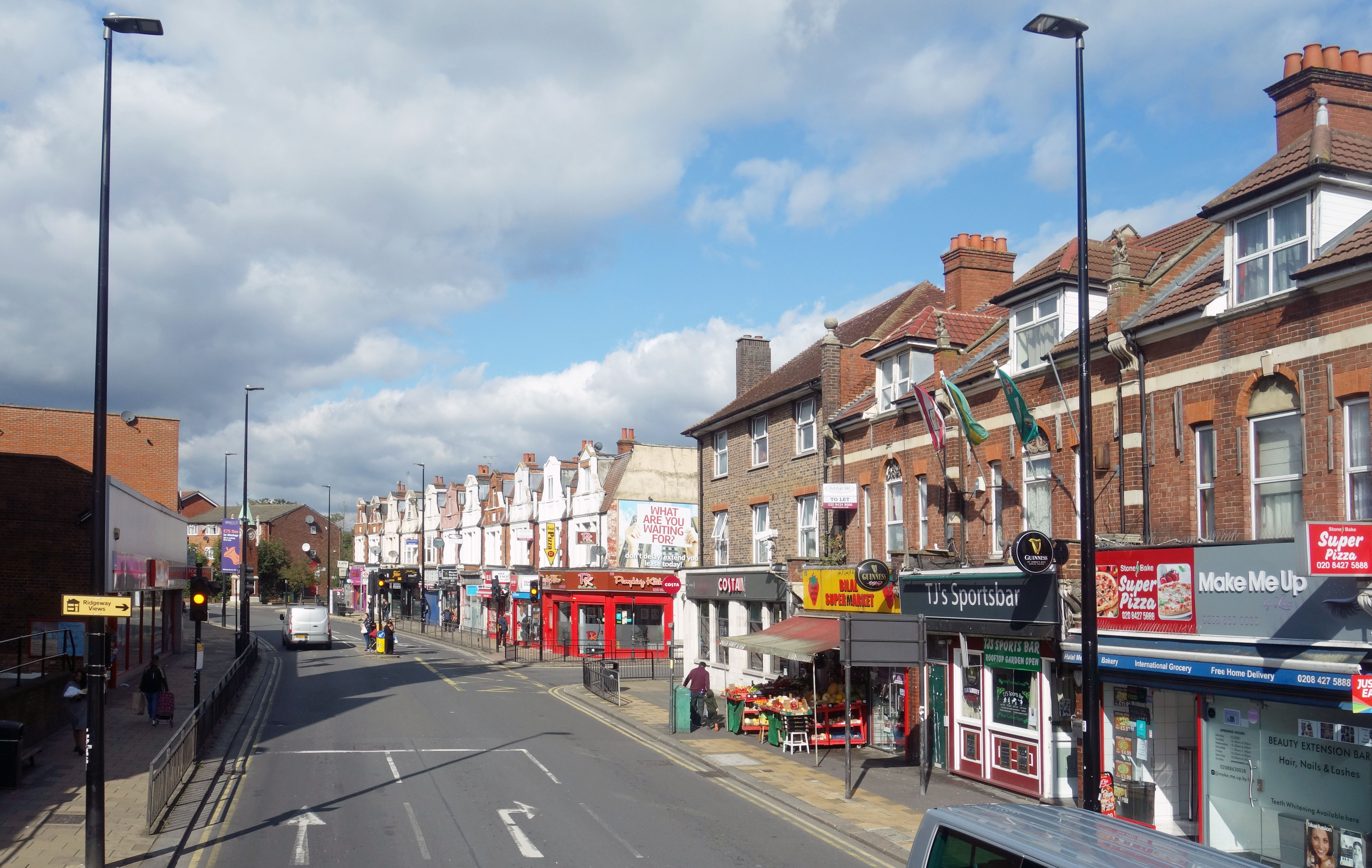
A high street in Harrow, London

The death of the high street is a phrase and proposed phenomenon mainly used to describe high streets in the United Kingdom facing long-term decline. High streets have been seeing increasing vacancy rates and are said to become rundown, abandoned, or otherwise less desirable shopping destinations and community spaces. It is related to the concept of retail apocalypse.

Factors that have accelerated the closure of retailers include the 2008 financial crisis, Brexit, and the COVID-19 pandemic. Other mechanisms to explain this include smaller independent shops and even larger retailers being unable to compete with online shopping and shopping centres which have become more popular due to consumer habits, as well rental pressures and economic stagnation. Money laundering fronts are often the only businesses able to operate in such conditions and are therefore marked as being both a sign and symptom of the death of the high street.

Suggested downstream impacts of the closure of high street shops include the effects on employment, as well as worsening social issues due to the loss of public space. The problems facing high streets are said to be particularly pronounced in the UK, with the country having high rates of consumer spending on online shopping, but reflect broader trends in the US and Europe.

The idea of a general trend towards retail shopping becoming obsolete or "death" of high street shopping has faced some criticisms for being overly simplistic, certain commentators went as far as to suggest the success of high streets represented a historic anomaly, or that the "death of the high street" was a recurring trope since at least 1945 and dependent on local circumstances. Proposed remedies to issues of vacancy rates include encouraging mixed used spaces and more flexible policies which allow for adaptive use of land.
