= Huckleberry Island (Ontario) =

Island in Ontario, Canada

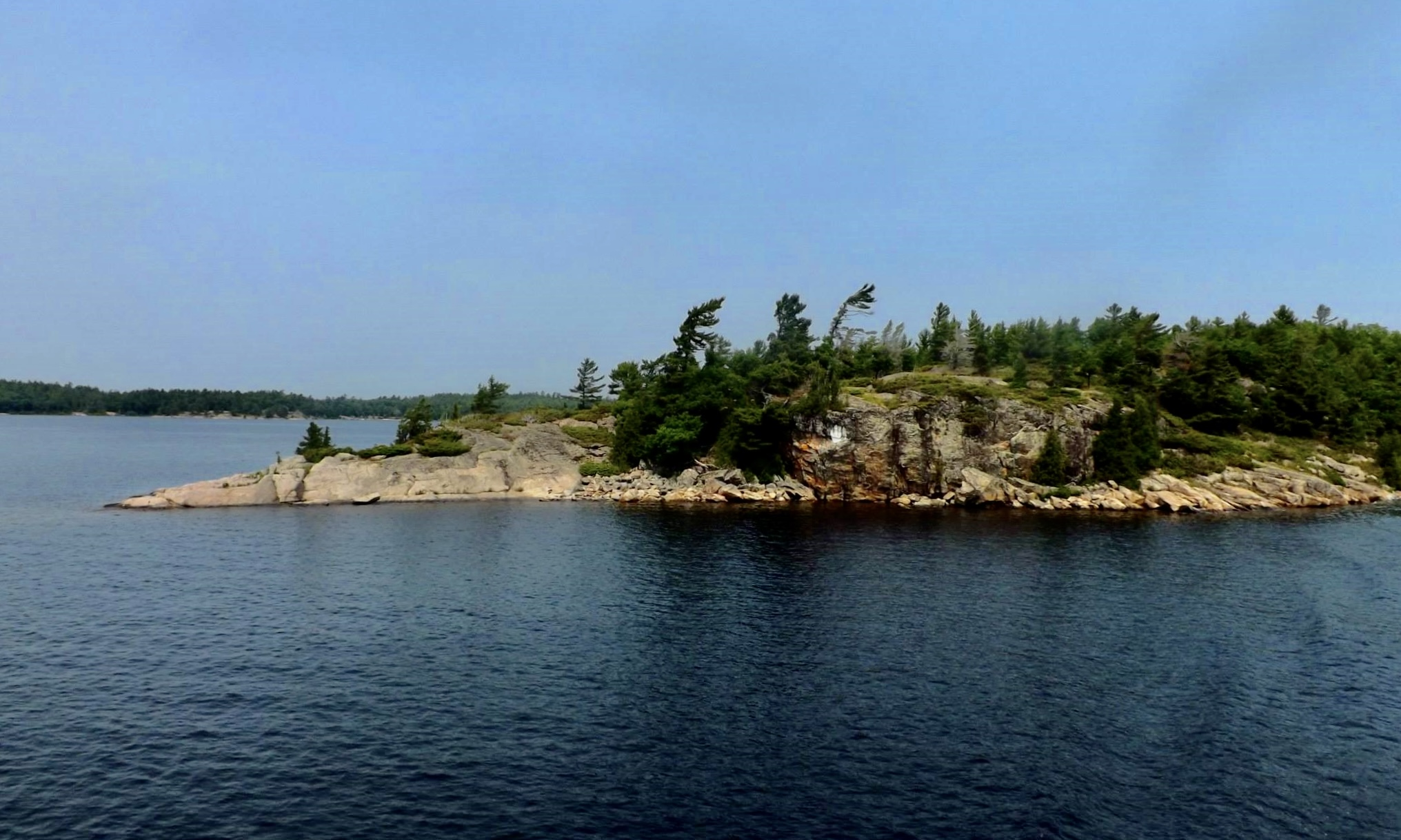
- The southwest shore of Huckleberry Island

- Location within Southern Ontario

Geography
- Coordinates: 45°23′08″N 80°07′10″W
- Adjacent to: Parry Sound

Administration
- Canada
- Province: Ontario
- District: Parry Sound
- Municipality: Carling

Huckleberry island is an island located inside of the Parry Sound, located about 6.5 kilometres (4.0 mi) northwest of the town of Parry Sound, in Ontario, Canada. It is a popular place for locals and tourists to visit during the summer months, mostly by a guided tour by the Island Queen Cruise where hikes and talks about ecology and wildlife take place.

The island is most well known for the "Parry Sound Hole in the Wall", which is a narrow passage between it and Wall Island about 32 metres (105 ft) wide minimum, where many tourists like to jump off the high cliffs.

In terms of flora, The island is home to many species, including Oaks, Pines, and Lowbush Blueberries. In terms of Fauna, the island is still very diverse, being full of American toads, green frogs, garter snakes, eastern chipmunks, and the common watersnake.
