= Little Partridge River (Ontario) =

- Location of the mouth of the Little Partridge River in Ontario

Location
- Country: Canada
- Province: Ontario
- Region: Northeastern Ontario
- District: Cochrane

Physical characteristics
- Source: Unnamed lake
  - coordinates: 51°00′07″N 80°07′10″W
  - elevation: 36 m (118 ft)
- Mouth: Partridge River
  - coordinates: 51°17′58″N 80°18′28″W
  - elevation: 1 m (3 ft 3 in)

Basin features
- River system: James Bay drainage basin

The Little Partridge River is a river in northern Cochrane District in Northeastern Ontario, Canada. It is in the James Bay drainage basin and is a right tributary of the Partridge River, which it enters just upstream of the latter's mouth at James Bay.

== Tributaries ==
- Waginagan Creek (left)
- Muskeg Creek (left)
- Atik Creek (left)

== See also ==
- List of rivers of Ontario

== Sources ==
- Map 15 (PDF) (Map). 1 : 1,600,000. Official road map of Ontario. Ministry of Transportation of Ontario. 2014.
- Restructured municipalities - Ontario map #3 (Map). Restructuring Maps of Ontario. Ontario Ministry of Municipal Affairs and Housing. 2006.
