= Flowerpot Island =

Island in Ontario, Canada

Coordinates: 45.306225°N 81.635113°W

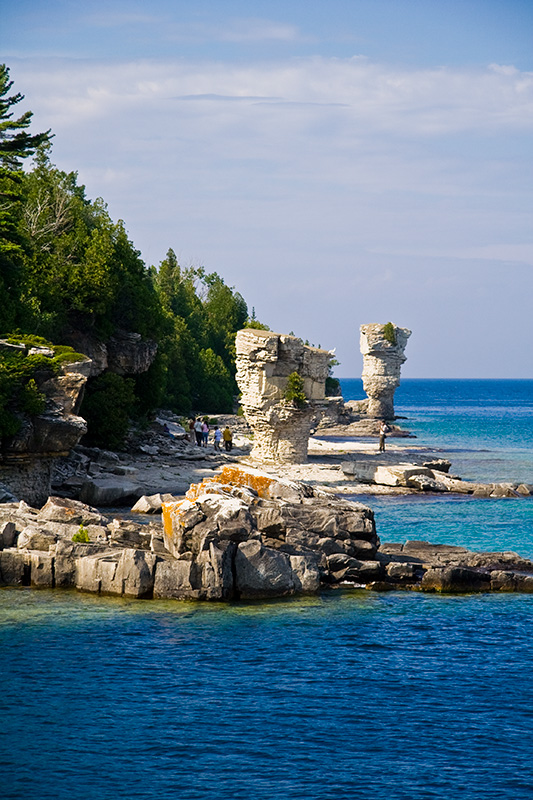
Both "flowerpots"

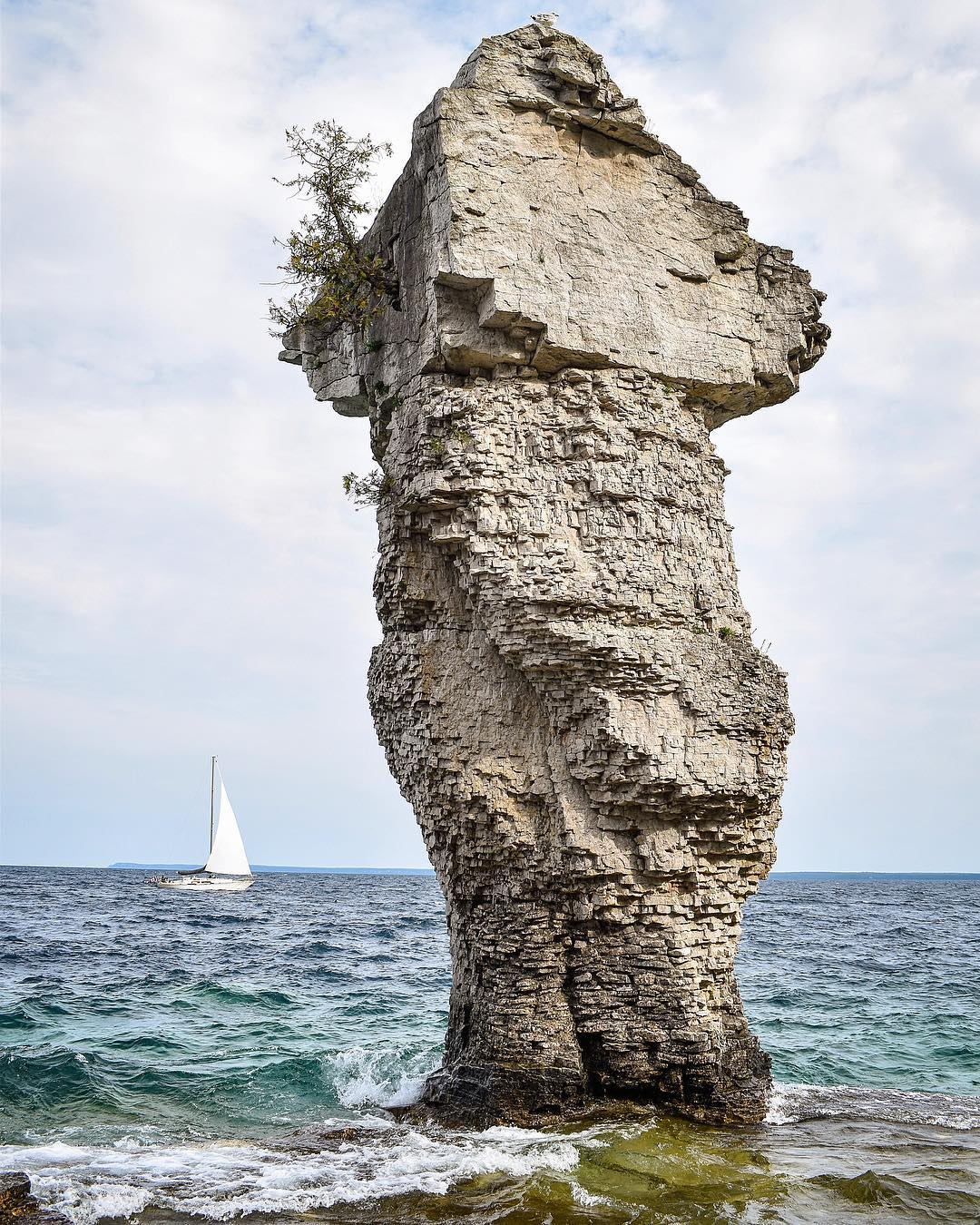
The taller flowerpot

Flowerpot Island is an island in Georgian Bay, in the Canadian province of Ontario, and is a part of Fathom Five National Marine Park. The island spans 2.1 kilometres (1.3 mi) from east to west, and 1.5 kilometres (0.93 mi) from north to south, and has a total area of 2 square kilometres (490 acres). The name of the island comes from two rock pillars on its eastern shore, which look like flower pots. A third flowerpot once stood, but tumbled in 1903.

Flowerpot Island is a popular tourist destination, with camping facilities and hiking trails. The island is accessible by cruises and rigid inflatable boats from Tobermory on the Bruce Peninsula.

== Formation ==
The Flowerpots are a type of sea stack, formed over many years as wind, rain, waves and ice hammered away at the cliff that once stood alongside the water's edge. The softer rock eroded more quickly, leaving the harder rock remaining in the shape of flowerpots with trees growing on top.

== See also ==
- Flowerpot rocks, also called Hopewell Rocks, New Brunswick, Canada
- True North II
- Corporation Island for information on the Flowerpots Islands in the River Thames, London, UK
