= Griffith Island (Georgian Bay) =

Island in Grey County, Ontario, Canada

Coordinates: 44.8422°N 80.9071°W

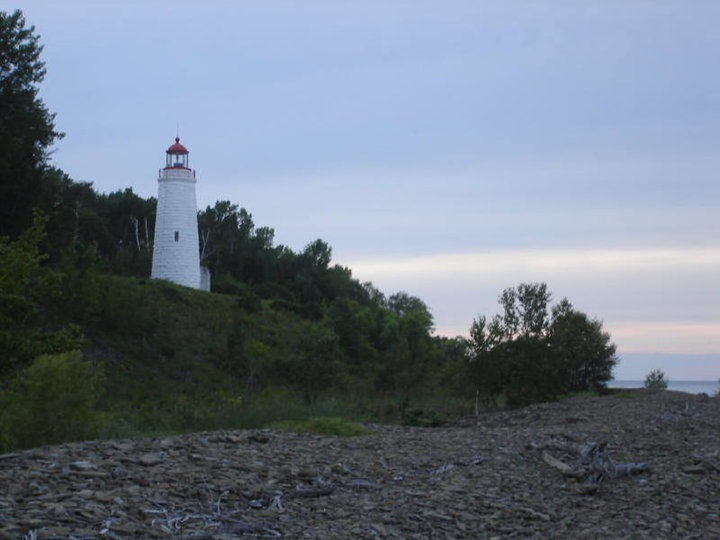
Tower at Griffith Island

Griffith Island is an island in Georgian Bay, in the province of Ontario, Canada. It is one of three islands in Colpoys Bay, and sits to the north east of Wiarton and north of Owen Sound. The other two islands in Colpoy's Bay are White Cloud Island and Hay Island. From the early 1970s, the island has been owned by and in private use of the Griffith Island Club, principally for recreational shooting and hunting. Hence, it is strictly off limits to the general public. The island has an airstrip, visible from satellite imagery, permitting authorized small aircraft to access the island.

A small part of the island is currently owned by the federal government of Canada and hosts the Griffith Island lighthouse and is one of the Imperial Towers. The lighthouse was built originally in 1859 and is one of six limestone lighthouses built in the 1850s.

The lighthouse is 25.9 meters (85 feet) in height. At first the light was powered by whale oil and later with kerosene. The keeper was required to polish the reflector, a long and tedious process. A keeper's house was also built on the site with two-foot thick stone walls, a slate roof and plastered interior. This lighthouse was automated in 1955 and the interior is in ruin. The light still operates and can be seen for a distance of 27.2 km (17 miles).
