= Giants Tomb Island =

Island in Ontario, Canada

Coordinates: 44°54′14.29″N 80°00′03.92″W

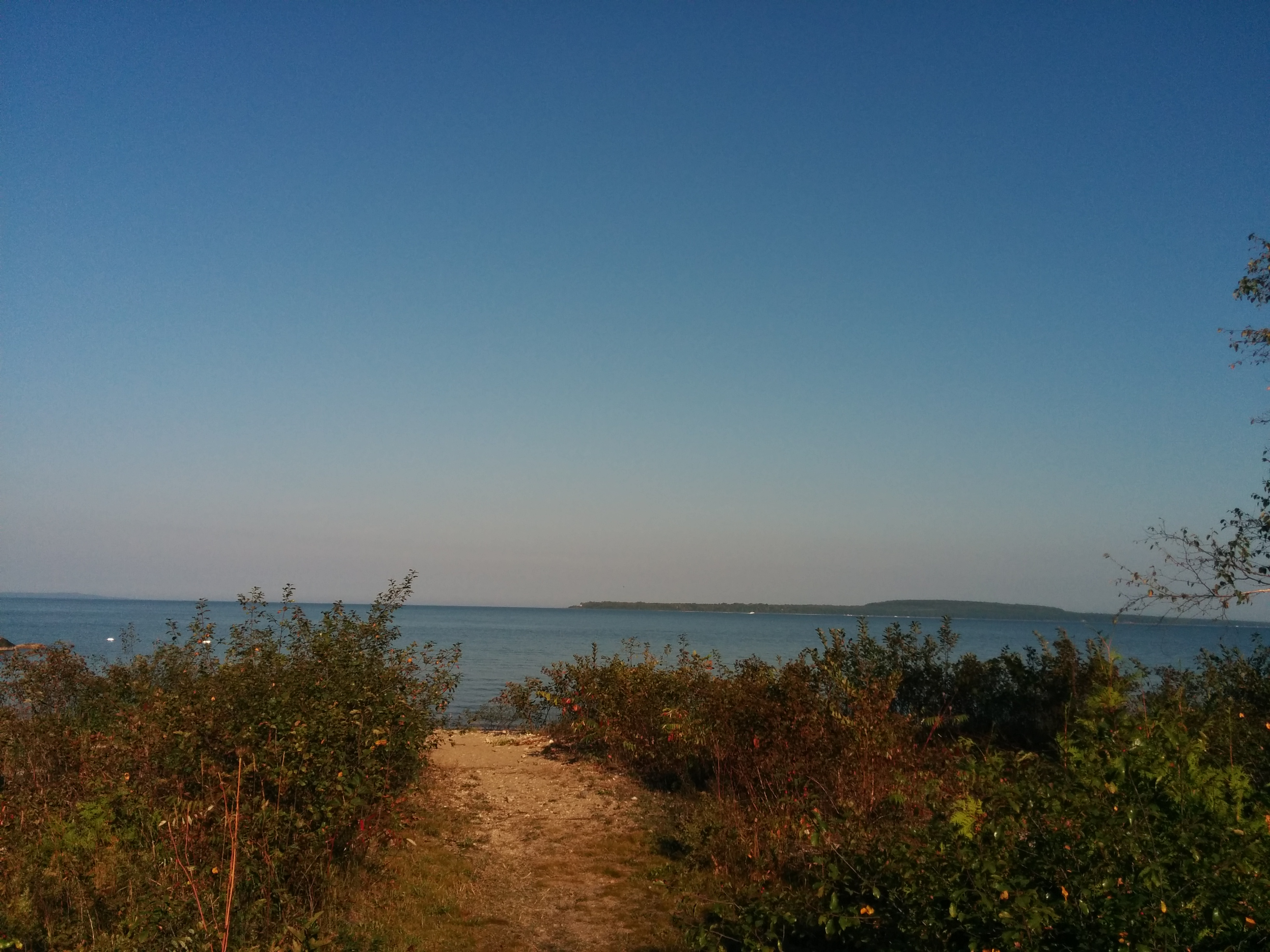
View of Giants Tomb island from Kettle's Beach to the south

Giants Tomb Island (French: Île Travers) is an island with no permanent residents located in Georgian Bay in Ontario, Canada. It measures approximately five kilometres from north to south and two kilometres from east to west.

== Location ==
It is part of the Awenda Provincial Park close to Penetanguishene and Midland. To the west there are other islands, Christian Island, Hope Island and Beckwith Island. Beausoleil Island, part of the Georgian Bay Islands National Park is only a few kilometres to the east. The western shore is strewn with large granite boulders, and out into the bay.

== History ==
The name of Giants Tomb Island comes from its resemblance to a giant tomb, supposedly that of the giant native deity, Kitchikewana.

== Giants Tomb Island Lighthouse ==
In 1892, the Department of Marine contracted Alphonse Tessier of Penetanguishene to construct a lighthouse to help warn mariners of Giants Tomb Island. Completed in 1893, the Department of Marine published the following details:

- Construction = Small wooden tower with dwelling attached painted white, the tower surmounted by an iron lantern painted red
- Height = 37 feet
- Light = Fixed white, elevated 40 feet above the level of the bay, and visible 11 miles

Later several amendments were done from the lighthouse keepers and after reconstruction to an unwatched flashing light in 1936, Giants Tomb Island Lighthouse remained in service until 1969.

== Leisure ==
Giants Tomb Island is popular for day trips with boaters as there are excellent sandy beaches and safe swimming. The south tip of the island or the beach on the east side are easy to access by kayak or canoe on a calm day. There are many shoreline access points off the mainland, from Awenda Provincial Park, or from public beaches at Sawlog Bay and Kettle's Beach.
