= Scotch Bonnet Ridge =

Lake Ontario ridge in Canada and the US

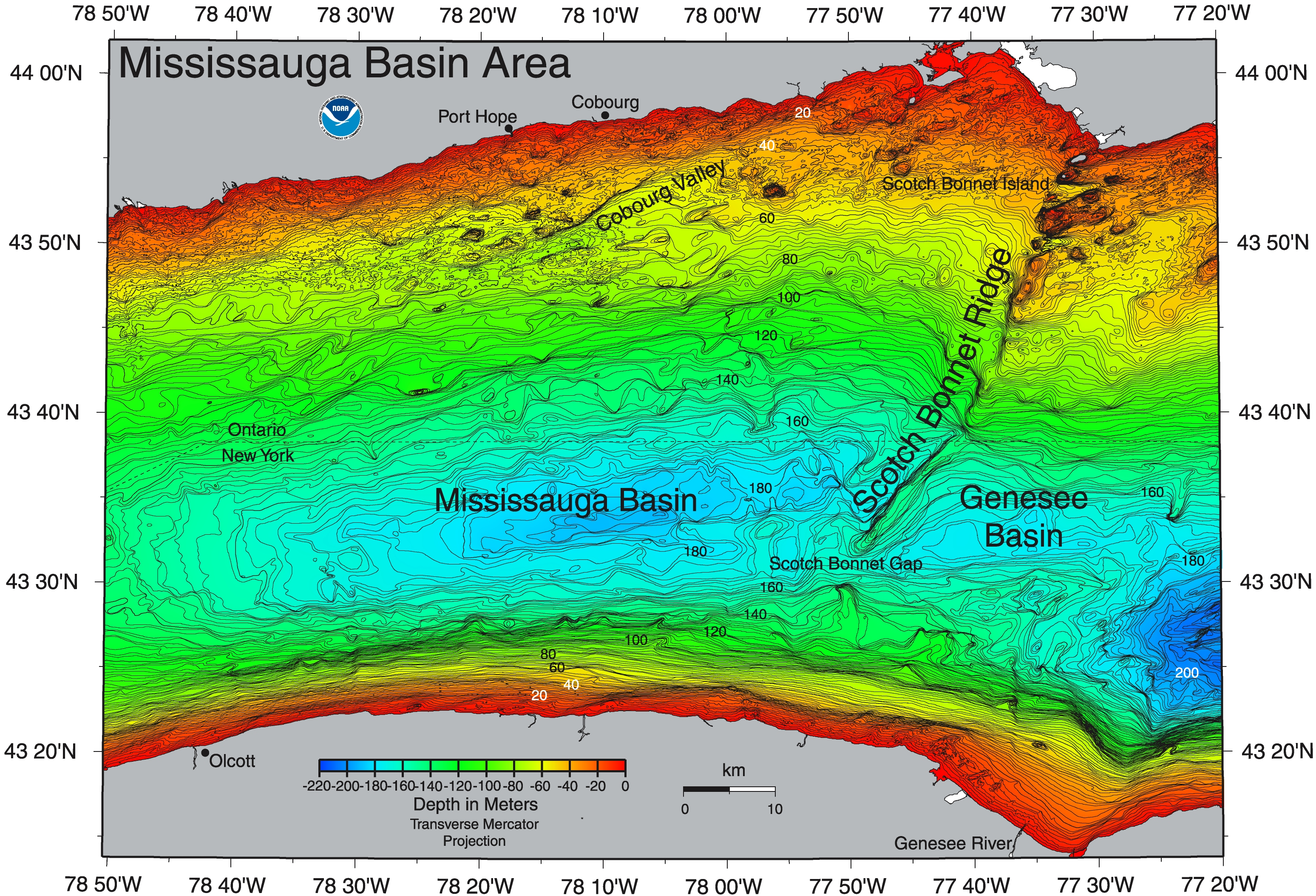

Scotch Bonnet Ridge is a geologic ridge that crosses the Canada-United States border, in Lake Ontario, south of Prince Edward County. Scotch Bonnet Island and Nicholson Island lie off the shore of Prince Edward County.

The ridge is composed of glacio-lacustrine clay and till.
