= Ghegheto Island =

Island in Ontario, Canada

Ghegheto
Nickname: Round Island
- Location within Canada

Geography
- Location: Lake Huron
- Coordinates: 44.81707°N 81.34557°W
- Highest elevation: 175 m (574 ft)

Administration
- Canada
- Province: Ontario

Ghegheto Island, also known as Round Island, is an island in Lake Huron, about 2 miles (3.2 km) from the coast near Howdenvale, Ontario. The island is about 1,770 feet (540 m) long on its south-southwest axis and 600 feet (180 m) across in the north-northeast direction. It sits on a shallow shoal that also includes Cavalier Island, and which can pose a danger to ship navigation. Collectively, the small islands in this area are known as the Fishing Islands.

Captain Bayfield, who charted the Bruce Peninsula in 1822, named the island after his Ojibwe assistant Ogima Ghegeto.

== Bibliography ==
- Great Lakes Pilot, Volume I: Lake St. Clair, St. Clair River, Lake Huron, Georgian Bay Including North Channel, Lake Michigan, and Lake Superior (2nd ed.). United States Hydrographic Office. 1921.
- Koenig, Edwin C. (2005). Cultures and Ecologies: A Native Fishing Conflict on the Saugeen-Bruce Peninsula. University of Toronto Press. ISBN 0-8020-8847-3.
