= Gravine Island =

Island in Baldwin County, Alabama, United States

Coordinates: 30.785465°N 87.929103°W

Gravine Island is a small, sparsely populated island in Baldwin County, Alabama. It is found in the Tensaw River about four miles (6.4 km) north of Interstate 10 and Mobile Bay.

The island is a nesting site for various species of turtle found in and around the Mobile-Tensaw River Delta. The endangered Alabama red-bellied turtle also lays eggs on the island. The island is mostly covered in brush and trees but has about 200 feet of sandy beach at the north end created by dredging spoil

Biologists have spotted nesting bald eagles around the island as well as at other locations in the delta.
