= Georgian Bay Littoral =

UNESCO Biosphere Reserve in Ontario, Canada

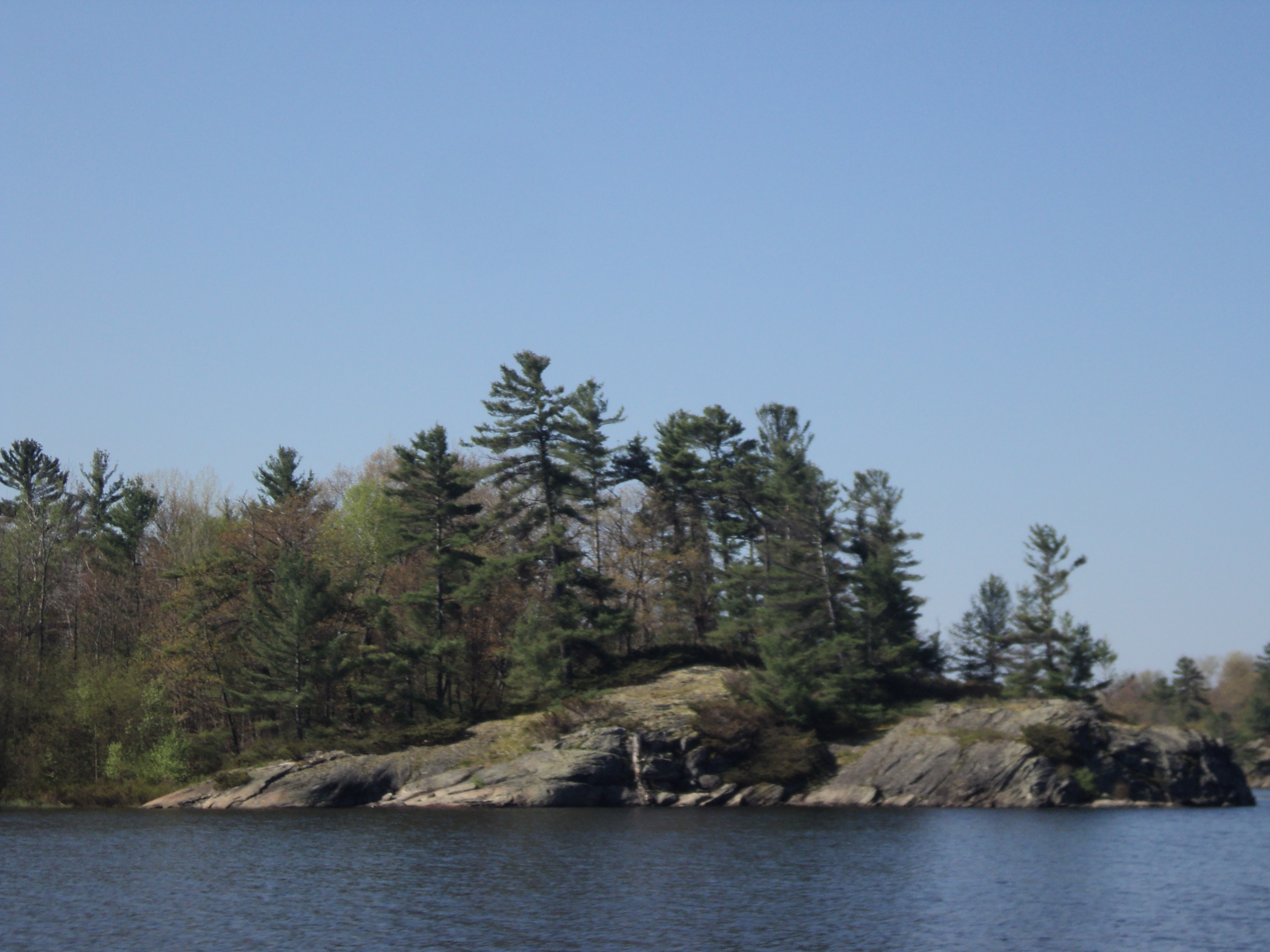
- Trees on rocky islands are typical of the area

- Location within Southern Ontario Location within Canada
- Location: Thirty Thousand Islands, Ontario, Canada
- Coordinates: 45°26′16″N 80°18′28″W
- Area: 347,270 hectares (858,100 acres)
- Established: November 2, 2004
- Website: www.gbbr.ca

The Georgian Bay Littoral (also called the Georgian Bay Biosphere Reserve) is a UNESCO Biosphere Reserve located in Ontario, Canada. It was declared in 2004 and covers an area of about 347,270 ha (858,100 acres). It covers the Thirty Thousand Islands area in the Georgian Bay, the largest freshwater archipelago in the world.

== Geography ==
The Georgian Bay Biosphere Reserve covers the Thirty Thousand Islands area on the eastern coast of the Georgian Bay, the largest archipelago in the Great Lakes, and the world's largest freshwater archipelago. It stretches about 200 km (120 mi) between the Severn and the French Rivers, and along Lake Huron.

It was declared a UNESCO Biosphere Reserve in 2004 and is Canada's thirteenth such reserve. It covers an area of about 347,270 ha (858,100 acres), which includes a land area of 206,288 ha (509,750 acres) and a marine area of 140,981 ha (348,370 acres).

== Ecology ==
The archipelago consists of several islands, and an extensive shoreline interspersed with several river deltas, fjords, and coves. The topography consists of sandy and rocky beaches along the coasts, along with wetlands, and vegetation inland.

The biosphere supports extensive biota with more than 100 vulnerable species recorded in the reserve. About 840 native plant species, 34 species of amphibians and reptiles, 170 species of birds, 44 species of mammals, and 34 species of reptiles and amphibians have been recorded in the region. The vegetation consists of needle leaf trees like white spruce (Picea glauca), eastern white pine (Pinus strobus), eastern white cedar (Thuja occidentalis), and red oak (Quercus rubra). Animal species found in the region include mammals such as moose (Alces alces), American black bear (Ursus americanus), North American river otter (Lontra canadensis) and snowshoe hare (Lepus americanus), and reptiles such as eastern massasauga rattlesnake (Sistrurus catenatus) and spotted turtle (Clemmys guttata).

== Economy ==
An estimated 20,000 people live in the region, and includes several indigenous clans. The economy is mostly dependent on agriculture and tourism.

== See also ==
- List of Biosphere Reserves in Canada
