= Partridge Island (Ontario) =

Island in Ontario, Canada

- Location within Ontario Location within Canada

Geography
- Location: Kenora District
- Coordinates: 56°02′12″N 87°32′22″W
- Adjacent to: Severn River

Administration
- Canada
- Province: Ontario

Demographics
- Population: uninhabited

Partridge Island is an island at the mouth of the Severn River in the Kenora District, Ontario, Canada. Although adjacent to Hudson Bay it does not lie in the bay, and is part of Ontario rather than Nunavut. It borders with the town of Fort Severn First Nation.

The island, one of ten Partridge Islands in Ontario, is uninhabited and rarely used. Wildlife flourishes on the island due to the lack of human intervention.
