= Scotch Bonnet Island =

Island in Prince Edward County, Ontario, Canada

Coordinates: 43°53′59″N 77°32′30″W

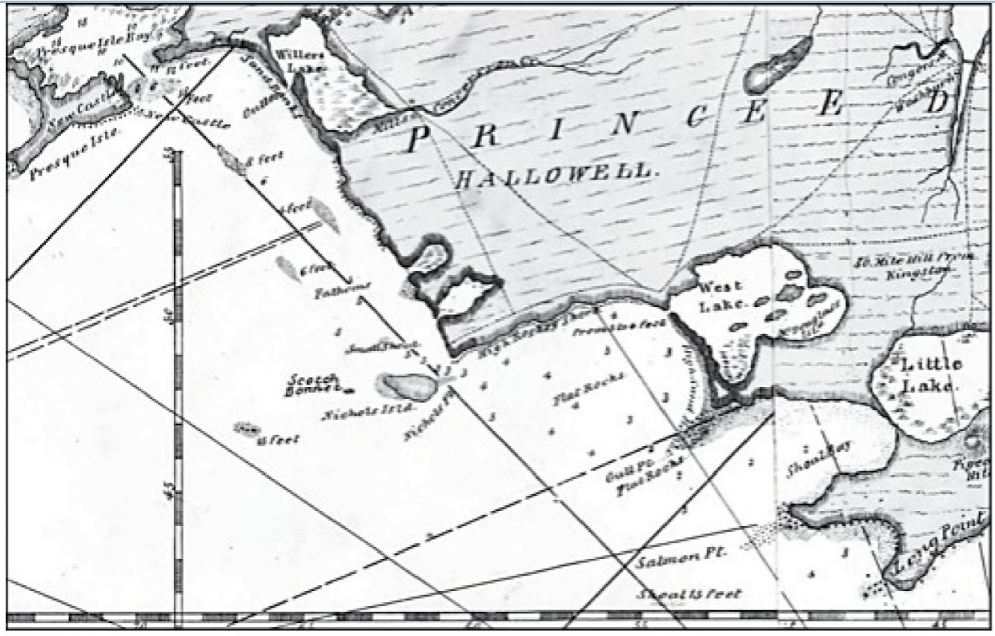
Western shore of Prince Edward County, Ontario, showing Nicholson and Scotch Bonnet islands.

Scotch Bonnet Island is a small island in Lake Ontario. It is part of Prince Edward County, Ontario, Canada.

The island is a low, bare, limestone outcropping, approximately 4 kilometres (2.5 mi) off the western shore of the Quinte peninsula. It is named after Scotch Bonnet Ridge, a nearby glacial feature, a north–south belt of glacio-lacustrine clay and till.

The possibility of operating a lighthouse on the island was explored as early as 1844. Funds were found to construct a lighthouse after the ship Christiana was wrecked on the island in 1851.

A traditional stone lighthouse was first erected on the island in 1856. It was replaced with a steel navigation tower in 1959. Ownership of the island was transferred to the Canadian Wildlife Service in 1979, after the Department of Transport declared it surplus. Later that year it was named the Scotch Bonnet Island National Wildlife Area.

Like other similar islands, the island is an important resting spot for birds migrating across the lake. During breeding season large numbers of waterbirds, like herring gulls and double-crested cormorants, raise their young on the island.
