= Georgian Bay =

Large bay of Lake Huron, Ontario, Canada

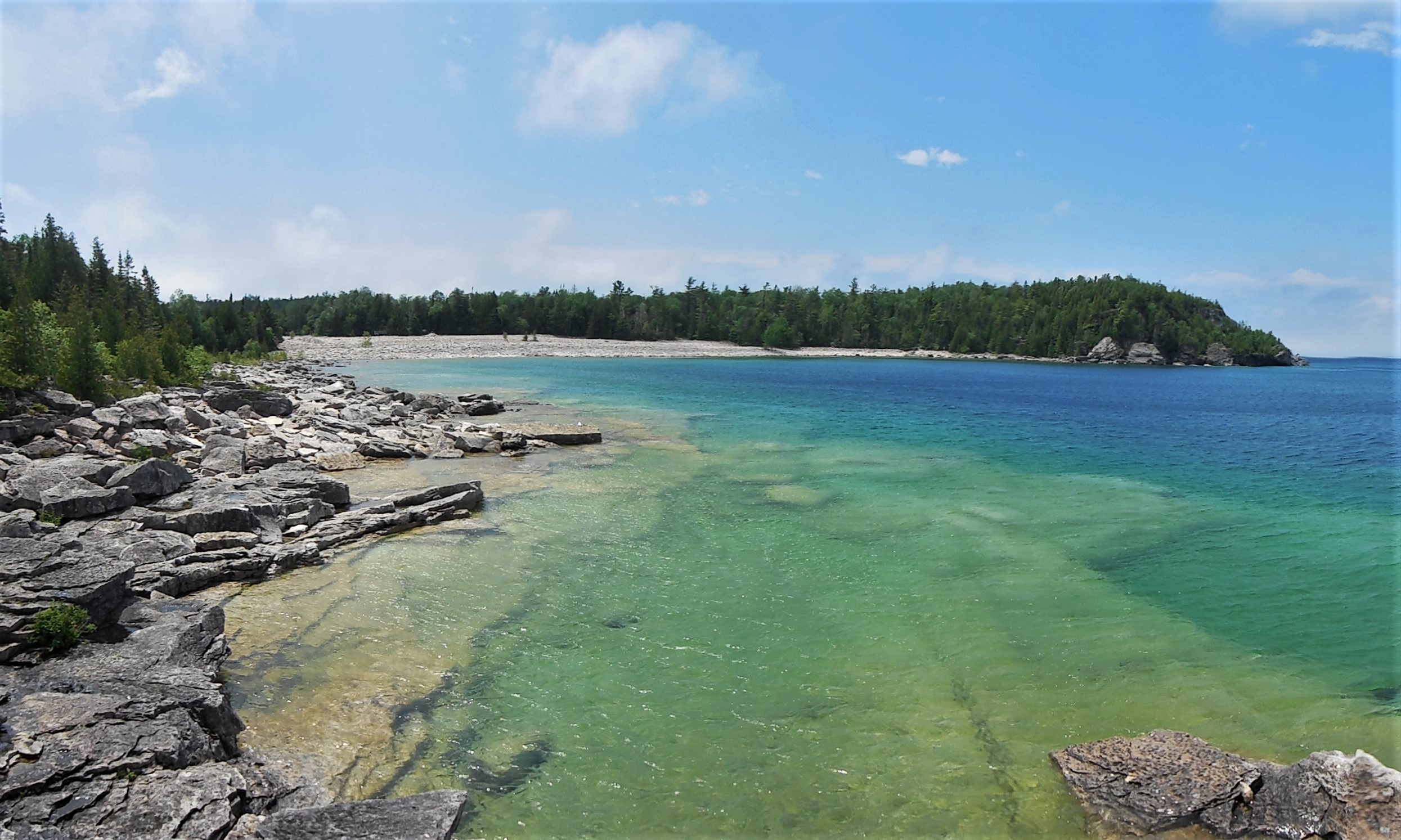
- Georgian Bay as seen from Bruce Peninsula National Park

- Location within Ontario
- Coordinates: 45.5°N 81.0°W
- Basin countries: Canada
- Max. length: 190 km (120 mi)
- Max. width: 80 km (50 mi)
- Surface area: 15,000 km^{2} (5,800 sq mi)
- Average depth: 150 feet (46 m) near the shoreline of Cabot Head
- Islands: 31,000+
- Settlements: Collingwood; Owen Sound; Meaford; Parry Sound; Wiarton; Lion's Head; Midland; Penetanguishene; Wasaga Beach; Killarney

Georgian Bay (French: Baie Georgienne) is a large bay of Lake Huron. It is located entirely within the borders of Ontario, Canada. The main body of the bay lies east of the Bruce Peninsula and Manitoulin Island. To its northwest is the North Channel.

Georgian Bay is surrounded by (listed clockwise) the districts of Manitoulin, Sudbury, Parry Sound and Muskoka, as well as the more populous counties of Simcoe, Grey and Bruce. The Main Channel separates the Bruce Peninsula from Manitoulin Island and connects Georgian Bay to the rest of Lake Huron. The North Channel, located between Manitoulin Island and the Sudbury District, west of Killarney, was once a popular route for steamships and is now used by a variety of pleasure craft to travel to and from Georgian Bay.

The shores and waterways of Georgian Bay are the traditional domain of the Anishinaabeg First Nations peoples to the north and Huron-Petun (Wyandot) to the south. The bay was thus a major Algonquian-Iroquoian trade route.

== Etymology ==
Georgian Bay has been known by several names. To the Ojibwe, it is known as "Spirit Lake". To the Huron-Wendat, it is known as Lake Attigouatan. Samuel de Champlain, the first European to explore and map the area in 1615–1616, called it "La Mer douce" (the sweet/calm/fresh sea), which was a reference to the bay's freshwater. It was named "Lake Manitoulin" by Royal Navy Captain William Fitzwilliam Owen. In 1822, after Great Britain had taken over the territory, Lieutenant Henry Wolsey Bayfield of a Royal Navy expedition named it the "Georgian Bay" (after King George IV).

== Geography ==
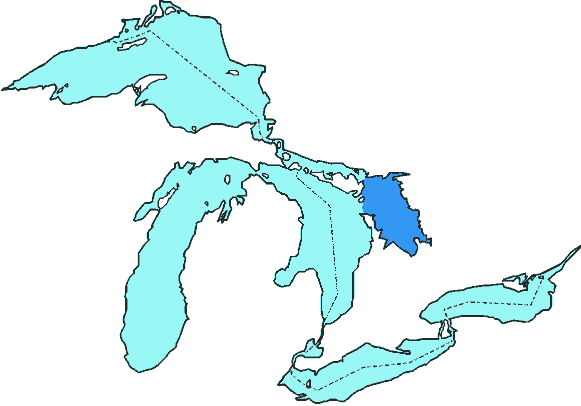
Main body of Georgian Bay highlighted on the map of the Great Lakes

Georgian Bay is about 190 kilometres (120 mi) long by 80 kilometres (50 mi) wide. It covers approximately 15,000 square kilometres (5,800 sq mi), making it nearly 80% the size of Lake Ontario.

The eastern Georgian Bay is part of the southern edge of the Canadian Shield, granite bedrock exposed by the glaciers at the end of the last ice age, about 11,000 years ago. The granite rock formations and windswept eastern white pine are characteristic of the islands and much of the shoreline of the bay. The rugged beauty of the area inspired landscapes by artists of the Group of Seven. The western part of the bay, from Collingwood north, and including Manitoulin, Drummond, Cockburn and St. Joseph islands, borders the Niagara Escarpment. Because of its size and narrowness of the straits joining it with the rest of Lake Huron, which is analogous to if not as pronounced as the separation of Lake Huron and Lake Michigan, Georgian Bay is sometimes called the "sixth Great Lake".

If Georgian Bay were considered a lake in its own right, it would be the fourth largest lake located entirely within Canada (after Great Bear Lake, Great Slave Lake and Lake Winnipeg). Including Georgian Bay, Lake Huron is the second largest of the Great Lakes by area, but if Georgian Bay were treated separately, Lake Huron would be the third largest (after Lake Superior and Lake Michigan, but still ahead of Lake Erie and Lake Ontario).

There are tens of thousands of islands in Georgian Bay. Most of these islands are along the east side of the bay and are collectively known as the "Thirty Thousand Islands", including the larger Parry Island. Manitoulin Island, lying along the northern side of the bay, is the world's largest island in a freshwater lake. The Trent–Severn Waterway connects Georgian Bay to Lake Ontario, running from Port Severn in the southeastern corner of Georgian Bay through Lake Simcoe into Lake Ontario near Trenton. Further north, Lake Nipissing drains into Georgian Bay through the French River. In October 2004, the Georgian Bay Littoral was declared a Biosphere Reserve by UNESCO.

== History ==
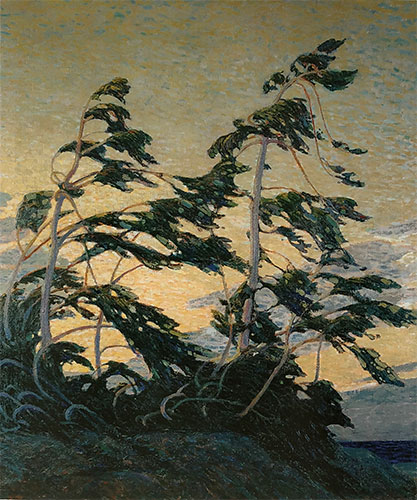
Tom Thomson, Pine Island, Georgian Bay, Winter 1914–16. National Gallery of Canada, Ottawa

Archaeological records reveal an Aboriginal presence in the southern regions of the Canadian Shield dating from 11,000 years ago. Evidence of later Paleo-Indian settlements have been found on Manitoulin Island and near Killarney.

During the period of deglaciation, a succession of prehistoric lakes in the Huron basin caused shoreline advance and retreat. The former shoreline of pro-glacial Lake Algonquin left behind high ridges which were attractive sites for human occupation. As shorelines retreated, the highly mobile Paleo-Indian groups of the period were able to migrate northward into this new land. Declining water levels created two distinct lakes in the Huron basin: Lake Stanley and Lake Hough, the latter of which corresponds to the modern Georgian Bay. Lake Stanley drained into Lake Hough through a spillway. While it is sometimes unclear whether some sites were contemporaneous with shorelines or were located a distance inland, sites are geographically temporally stratified in correspondence with water levels.

For example, at two sites along Batteaux Creek near modern-day Collingwood adjacent to the south shore of Georgian Bay, the transitional Late Paleo-Indian–Early Archaic McKean site corresponds to the relatively low water ebb of Lake Hough, while the Middle Archaic Rentner site (likely a true shoreline site) reflects the high water levels of the later Nipissing transgression.

At the time of European contact, the Ojibwe and Ottawa First Nations, both of whom call themselves Anishinaabe (plural: Anishinaabeg), lived along the northern, eastern and western shores of Georgian Bay. The Huron (or Wendat) and Petun inhabited the lands along the southern coast, having migrated from the northern shores of Lake Ontario. Names of islands such as "Manitoulin" (from Gitchi Manitou, the Great Spirit who left the bay as a source of life for the first people) and "Giant's Tomb" are indicative of the richness of the cultural history of the area. Aboriginal communities continue to live on their territories and practise their cultural traditions.

The first European to visit this area was likely Étienne Brûlé, who at an age of less than 20, in 1610 was sent to live as an interpreter trainee with the Onontchataronon, an Algonquian people of the Ottawa River. He travelled every winter to live with the Arendarhonon people of the Huron-Wendat Nation at the southern end of Georgian Bay, in the area now called Huronia. Brulé returned to the Arendarhonon the following year. At the same time another young interpreter trainee, a youth remembered only as Thomas, who was employed by the French surgeon and trader Daniel Boyer, also likely made it to Huronia, in the company of the Onontchataronon, another member of the confederacy.

In 1615, Brulé's employer, the French explorer Samuel de Champlain, made his own visit to Georgian Bay and overwintered in Huronia. He was preceded that summer by a Récollet missionary, Joseph Le Caron, who would live among the Huron in 1615–1616 and 1623–1624. Another Récollet missionary, Gabriel Sagard, lived there from 1623 to 1634. The French Jesuit Jean de Brébeuf began a mission in Huronia in 1626. In 1639 he oversaw the building of the mission fort of Sainte-Marie, Ontario's first European settlement, at what is now the town of Midland. The reconstructed Jesuit mission, Sainte-Marie among the Hurons, is now a historic park operated by Huronia Historical Parks, an agency of the Ontario Ministry of Tourism and Culture. Also nearby is the Martyrs' Shrine, a Catholic church dedicated to the Canadian Martyrs, Jesuits who were killed during Iroquois warfare against the Huron around Georgian Bay in the 17th century. The Bay appears on maps of the time as "Toronto Bay".

Penetanguishene, the location of an Ojibwe village located at the southern tip of the bay near present-day Midland, was developed as a naval base in 1793 by John Graves Simcoe, first Lieutenant Governor of Upper Canada. In 1814, during the War of 1812 between Great Britain and the United States, one of the battles was fought in the southern Georgian Bay. On August 17, at the mouth of the Nottawasaga River near Wasaga Beach, the British schooner HMS Nancy was sunk by three American vessels. Several weeks later, Nancy was avenged when British boarding parties in the De Tour Passage surprised and captured two of the three American vessels.

The first nautical charts of Georgian Bay were made in 1815 by Captain William Fitzwilliam Owen, who called it Lake Manitoulin. Captain Henry Bayfield, who made more detailed charts of the bay, renamed it in 1822 after King George IV. His charts are the basis for those in use today.

The Canadian Hydrographic Service traces its history back to 1883, when it was originally established as the Georgian Bay Survey, tasked with charting and improving knowledge of the bay after a steamship wrecked there the previous year, killing 150 of its passengers.

Over the years, 32 lighthouses were built on Georgian Bay. Six of them were designed with limestone towers; these were built in the 1850s and are known collectively as the Imperial Towers. Some of the 32 can be toured by the public, some cannot, and some are accessible only by tour boats or private boat.

== Legend of Kitchikewana ==
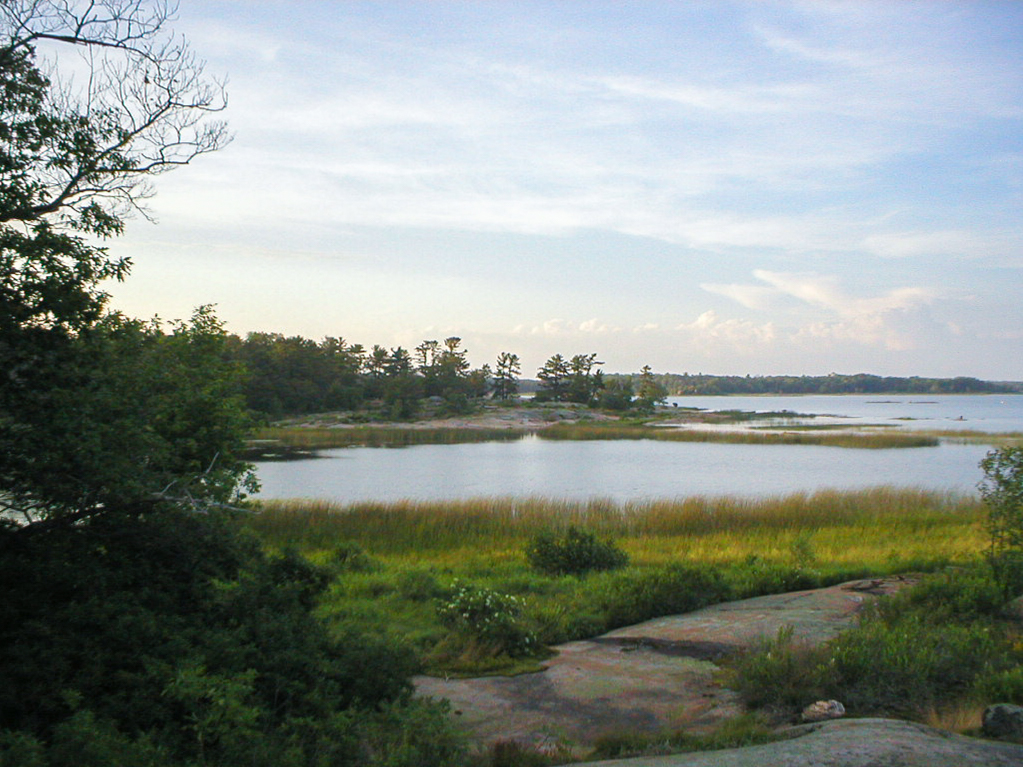
The waters between Finger Point and Thumb Point near Cedar Springs, Beausoleil Island

Wyandot legend tells of a god called Kitchikewana, who was large enough to guard the whole of Georgian Bay. Kitchikewana was known for his great temper, and his tribe decided the best way to calm him was with a wife. They held a grand celebration, and many women came. Kitchikewana met a woman named Wanakita here. He decided that this was the woman he wanted to marry, and started planning the wedding immediately after she left. But when she was invited back, she told Kitchikewana that she was already engaged. Enraged, Kitchikewana destroyed all the decorations, running to one end of Beausoleil Island and grabbing a large ball of earth. Running to the other end, he tossed it into the Great Lakes. Thus, the 30,000 Islands were created. The indentations left behind by his fingers form the five bays of Severn Sound: Midland, Penetang, Hog, Sturgeon, and Matchedash. He then lay down to sleep and sleeps there still as Giant's Tomb Island.

The town of Penetanguishene now has a large statue of Kitchikewana on its main street, and there is a YMCA summer camp for youth located on Beausoleil Island named after Kitchikewana.

== Settlements ==
Wasaga Beach has now passed Collingwood as the largest town on the bay, not long after Collingwood had surpassed Owen Sound. Owen Sound served for a long time as a shipping and rail depot for the Upper Great Lakes. The towns of Midland and Penetanguishene and villages of Port Severn and Honey Harbour are at the southeastern end of the bay and are popular sites for summer cottages, as are the many bays and islands on the eastern coast. Collingwood, Meaford, and Wasaga Beach are located at the southern end of the bay, around Nottawasaga Bay. Owen Sound, Wiarton, and Lion's Head are located on the Bruce Peninsula along the southern and southwestern shores of the bay, while Tobermory is located at the northern tip of the Bruce Peninsula on the Main Channel. The passenger ferry MS Chi-Cheemaun travels from Tobermory across the Main Channel to South Baymouth on Manitoulin Island. Parry Sound, the world's deepest freshwater port, is located on the eastern shore of the bay.

There are communities of summer cottages on the north and east shore and on the adjacent 30,000 Islands. These include areas such as Cognashene, Wah Wah Taysee, Sans Souci, Pointe au Baril and Byng Inlet. Most of these cottages are accessible only by water.

== Images ==
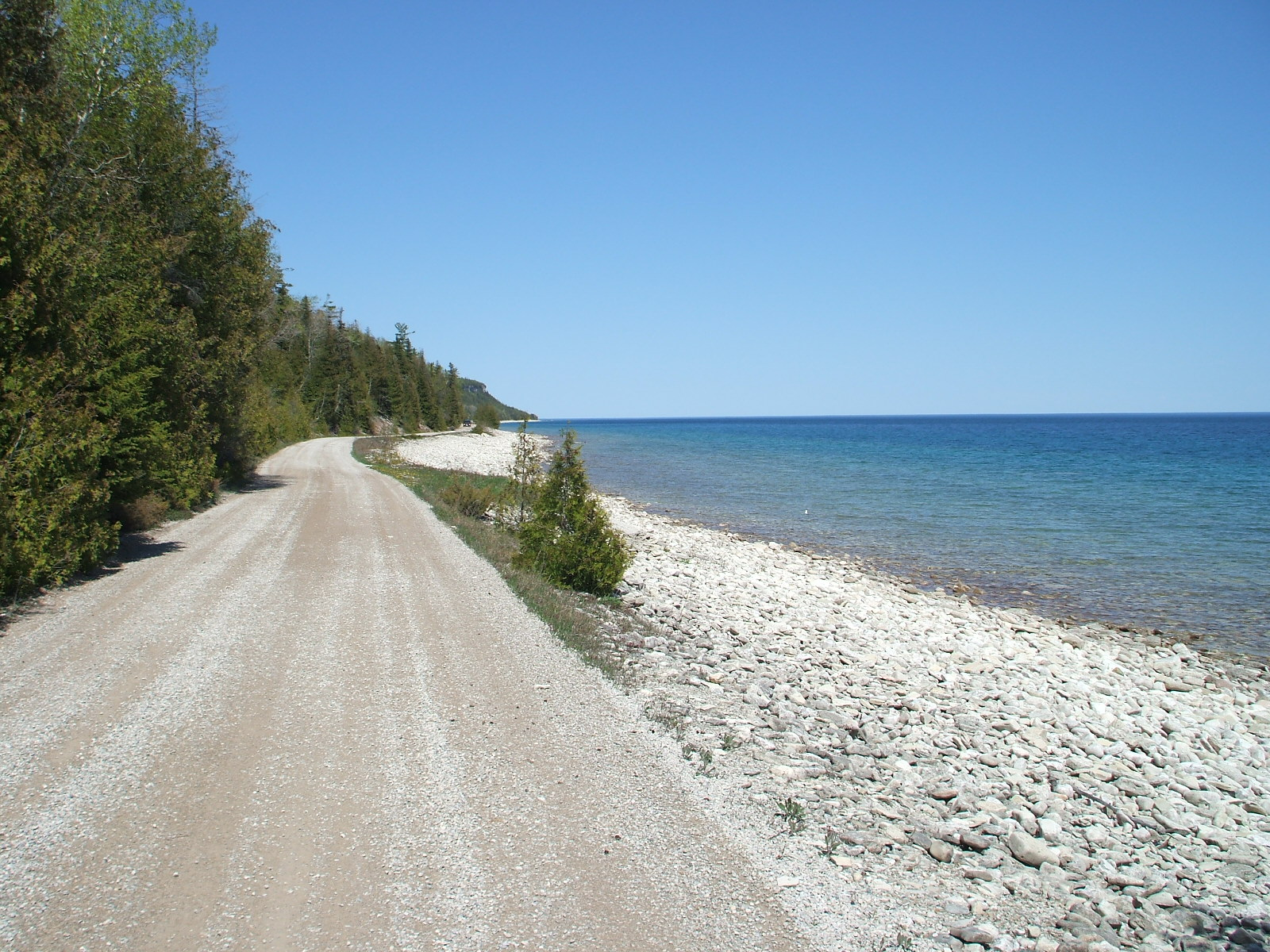
Georgian Bay at Cabot Head

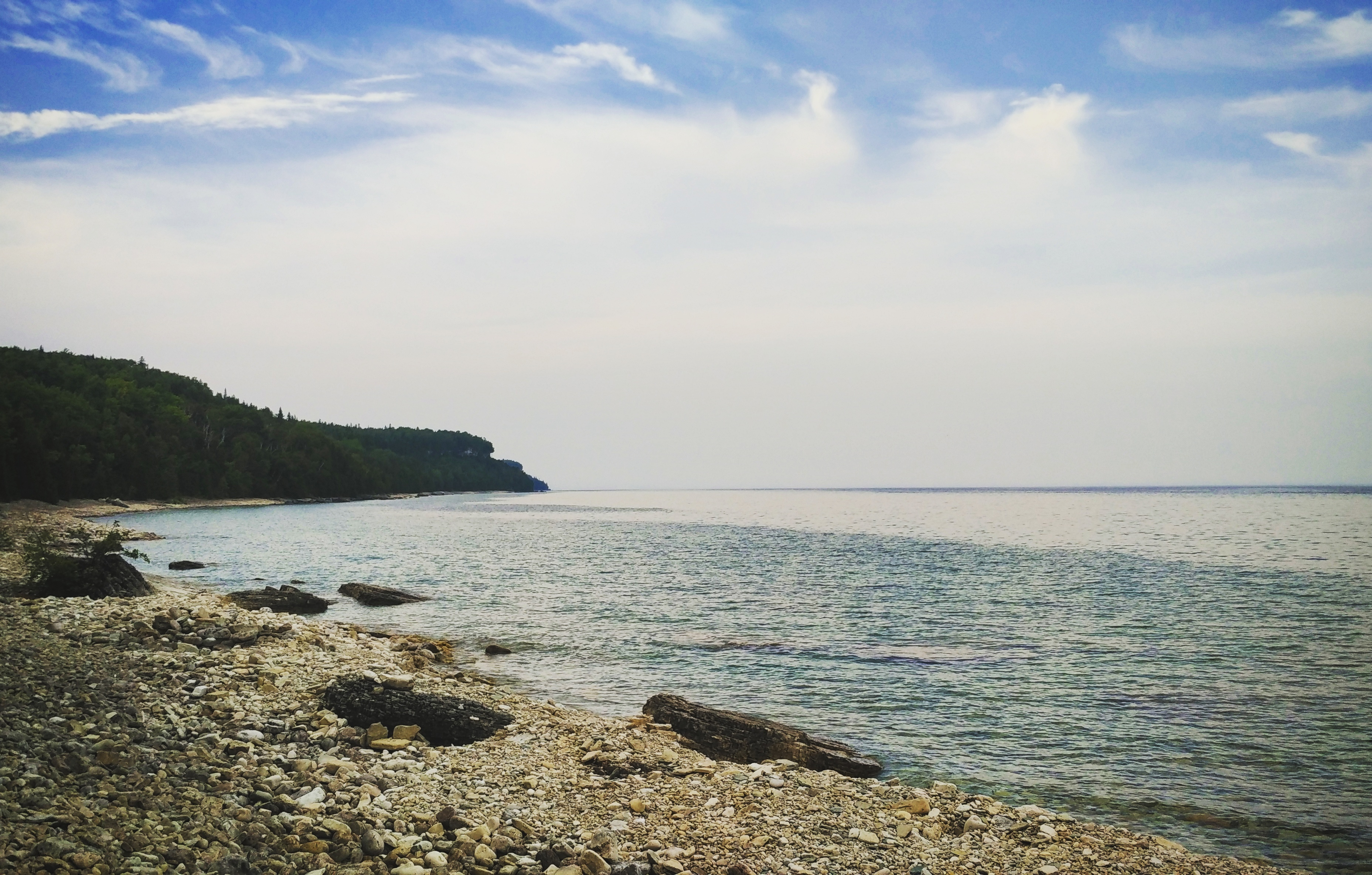
Reed's dump beach on Georgian Bay near the campsite

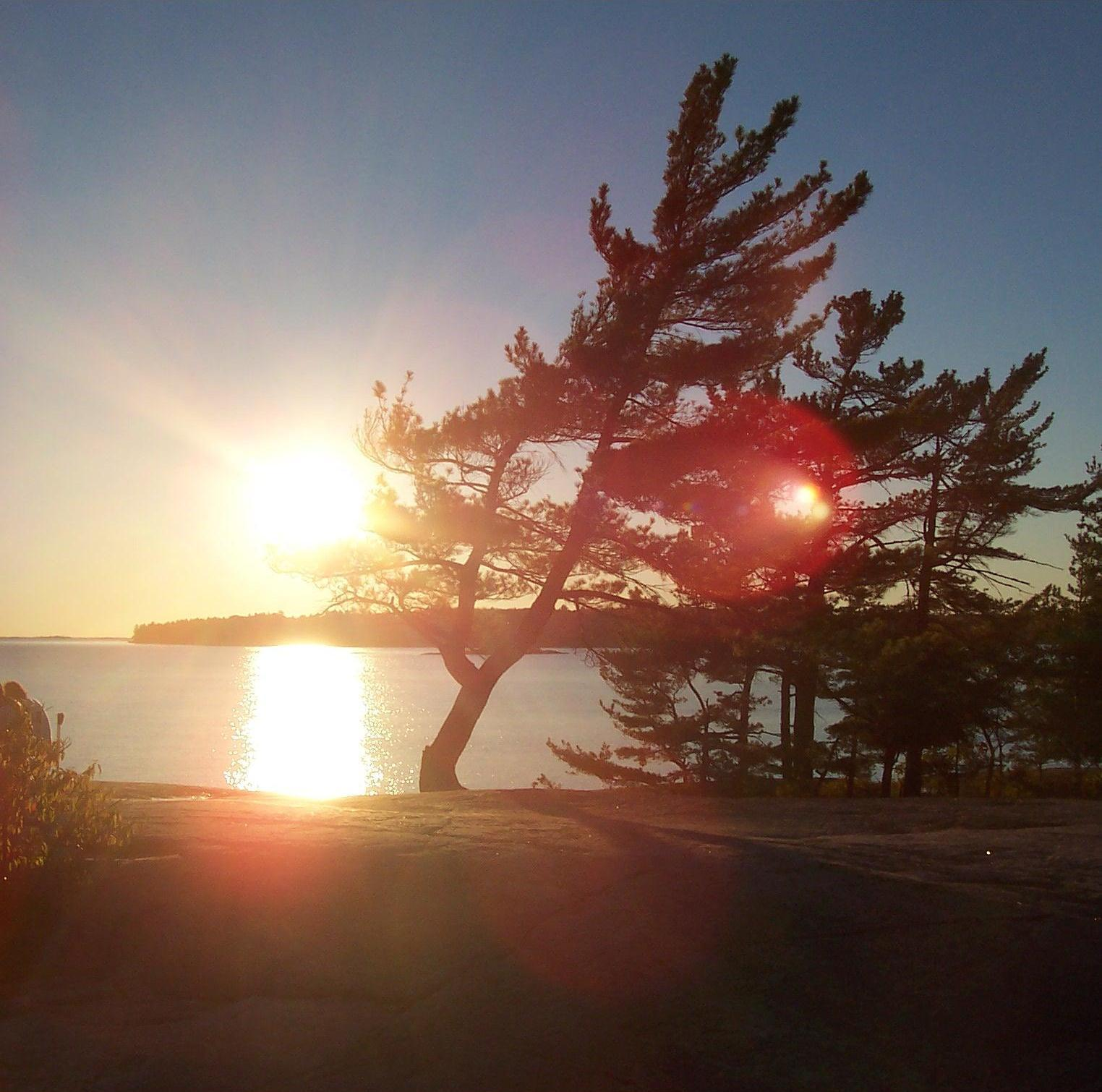
Shoreline of Georgian Bay

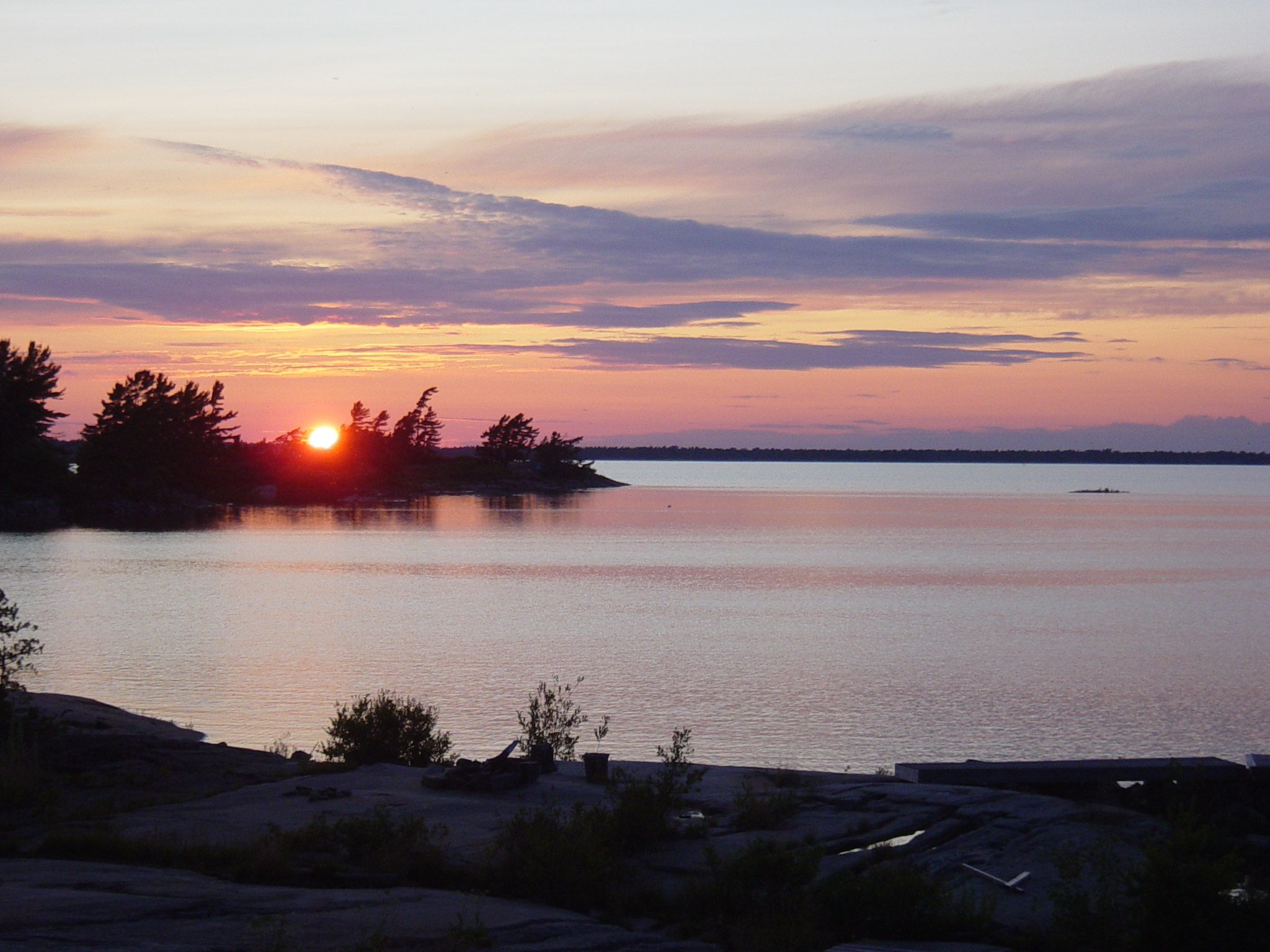
Sunset over Georgian Bay

== See also ==
- Christian Island (Ontario)
- Royal eponyms in Canada
- True North II
