= Joseph Snake =

Joseph Snake was an Ojibwe chief belonging to the Chippewas of Lakes Huron and Simcoe from sometime before 1842 until his death in 1861.

Having relinquished virtually all of their territory west of Lake Simcoe to the government of Upper Canada in the Lake Simcoe–Lake Huron Purchase of 1815 and the Lake Simcoe–Nottawasaga Purchase of 1818, these Ojibwe converted to Methodism in 1828 and were persuaded by Lieutenant Governor John Colborne to settle permanently in 1830 in purpose-built villages at Coldwater and Atherley Narrows between Lakes Simcoe and Couchiching. At the same time, Colborne set aside Georgina Island, Snake Island, and Fox Island in Lake Simcoe as a reservation for the Ojibwe.

A change of government in 1836, with Francis Bond Head replacing Colborne as Lieutenant Governor, soon brought this "civilising" experiment to an end. Bond Head persuaded the Ojibwe to leave the Narrows-Coldwater corridor (which remained Crown land) in return for one-third of the proceeds of the anticipated sales of lots there to future European settlers. In 1842, their leading chiefs, Musquakie (otherwise known as William Yellowhead), head chief and leader of the Narrows settlement, and John Aisance, leader of the Coldwater settlement, wrote to Governor General Charles Bagot protesting that Bond Head had not fully explained this purchase agreement, and had, in particular, not made it clear that it did not involve an upfront, lump-sum payment, nor that the Ojibwe would receive only one-third of the sale proceeds. One of the four other chiefs who subscribed to this letter was Joseph Snake, whose signature occurs immediately after that of Musquakie, and before that of Aisance in the list.

As a result of the 1836 agreement, the Ojibwe were obliged to abandon their villages at the Narrows and Coldwater and make homes elsewhere. Whereas Musquakie led the Narrows band to a new settlement at nearby Rama in 1838, and Aisance led the Coldwater band to Beausoleil Island in Georgian Bay in 1842, it seems that the Ojibwe who had settled after 1830 on Snake Island and the other islands of Lake Simcoe remained in place with Joseph Snake as their chief. They sustained themselves by hunting and fishing, although a certain amount of farming was also taking place. By 1858 this "Snake Island band" was regarded by the government as a distinct community from the Rama band (now the Chippewas of Rama First Nation) and the Beausoleil band (now the Beausoleil First Nation), but they retained close links to Rama, whose Methodist preacher ministered to them. The band was the historical antecedent of the Chippewas of Georgina Island First Nation.

Chief Joseph Snake died in 1861. Chief Joseph Snake Road on Georgina Island was named for him.
