= Georgina Island =

Island in Ontario, Canada

Coordinates: 44.3747°N 79.2937°W

Native name: Waaseyaagmiing
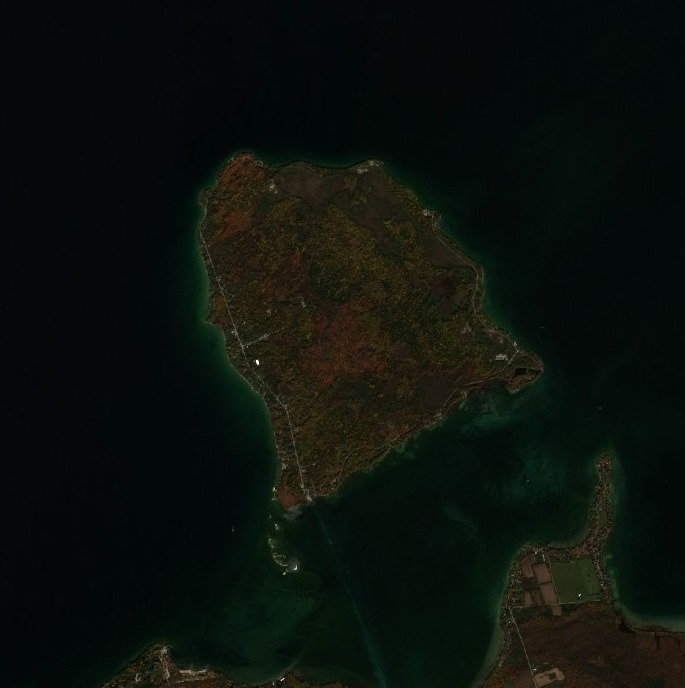
- A satellite image of Georgina Island
- Interactive map of Georgina Island

Geography
- Location: Lake Simcoe

Administration
- CAN
- Province: Ontario
- Region: York
- Municipality: Georgina

Georgina Island (Ojibwe: Waaseyaagmiing) is the largest lake island in Lake Simcoe, located in southern Ontario, Canada. The island is a Native reserve populated by the Chippewas of Georgina Island First Nation, a band of Ojibwa people. It is also within the Town of Georgina and in the Regional Municipality of York.

Before the completion of the Trent–Severn Waterway, the water level on Lake Simcoe was low enough to enable residents to cross in wagons or walk in ankle-deep water to the mainland, at Virginia Beach, Ontario. After the Trent Severn Waterway was completed, the water level increased enough to submerge traditional farmlands and to require a boat for crossing to the mainland.

Pope John Paul II stayed on neighbouring Strawberry Island for four days just before World Youth Day 2002 in Toronto.

The island is reached by a ferry in summer and an airboat in winter. On the coldest days of winter Lake Simcoe is cold enough for an ice road to be built allowing light vehicles to drive across the frozen lake. The Women's Support Network of York Region has worked with the First Nations of Georgina Island.

== Settlement ==
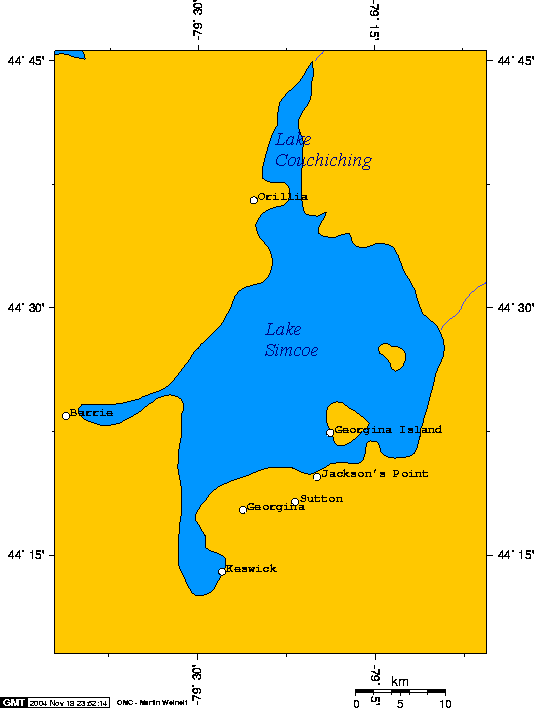

During the American War of Independence, British colonial authorities began to strategically engage in relationships with the Native people of present-day Ontario, seeking to acquire and settle their territories for the purpose of defending British North America. The Chippewas of Lakes Huron and Simcoe in the early nineteenth century consisted of several bands. Two groups, led by William Yellowhead and Joseph Snake, occupied areas of southernmost Simcoe County, which they relinquished to the government in 1818. A third group, led by John Aisance, occupied areas between Kempenfelt Bay and Penetanguishene, which they surrendered to the government in 1815. In 1830 the government set aside Georgina Island, Snake Island and Fox Island, all in Lake Simcoe, as a reserve for these groups, but encouraged them to settle instead in purpose-built villages at Coldwater (where Aisance and his people settled) and Atherley Narrows (where Yellowhead and Snake settled) where they might take up farming. The corridor of Crown land between Lake Couchiching, and the Severn River was informally given to the Chippewas as a hunting ground, but in 1836 a deal was struck to return this territory (including the two villages) to government hands, leaving the Chippewas with the Lake Simcoe islands as their last remaining reserve. Yellowhead and his band purchased land at Rama and settled there in 1838, whereas Aisance led his people to Beausoleil Island in Georgian Bay in 1842, from which they relocated to Christian Island in 1856. As part of this final dispersal of the Chippewas of Lakes Huron and Simcoe, some remained behind on Snake Island and the neighbouring islands with Snake as their leader.

The role of the colonial government had a significant impact on the people, enforcing a policy to enrol the people and grow dependent on the crown. The influence of this policy resulted in repeated promises of protection, food, clothing, lodgings and general welfare of the people. The transformation from independent and autonomous communities to those that were increasingly dependent to the Crown. The area between Lake Ontario, Georgian Bay and Lake Simcoe represented a region of prime military vulnerability and defence for Upper Canada. This region was not only occupied by the Lake Simcoe Indigenous People, but also the people under the leadership of Joseph Brant of the Six Nations. Six Nations lies in the town of Ohsweken, Ontario.
