= Chippewas of Rama First Nation =

Anishinaabe First Nation in Ontario, Canada

- Band No. 139
- Mnjikaning Anishinaabek
- Headquarters: Rama, Ontario
- Province: Ontario

Land
- Main reserve: Chippewas of Rama First Nation
- Reserves: Chippewa Island, Indian River
- Land area: 912.5 ha (2,255 acres)

Government
- Chief: Edward Anthony
- Council: 1082

Tribal Council
- Ogemawahj Tribal Council

Website
- ramafirstnation.ca

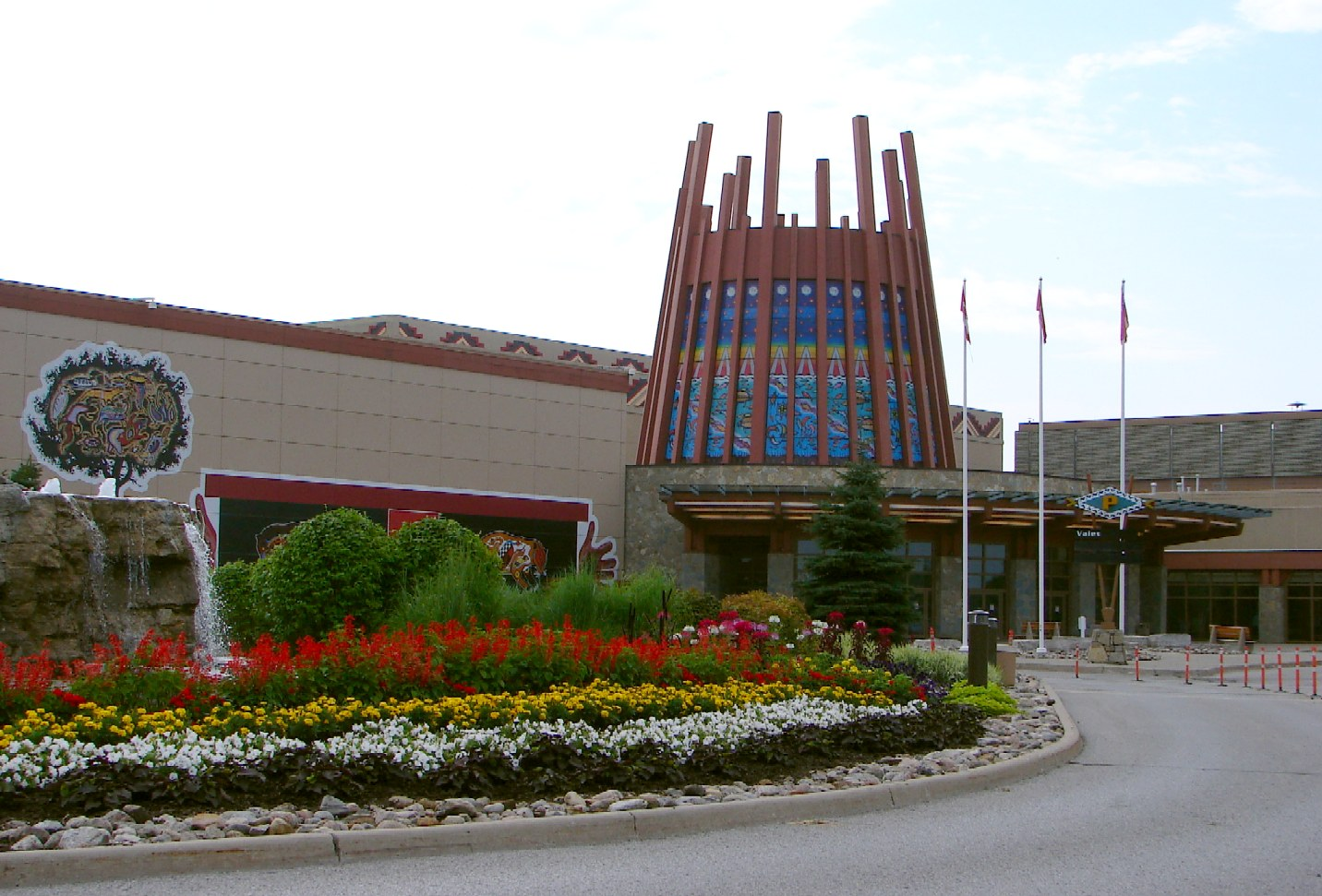
Casino Rama

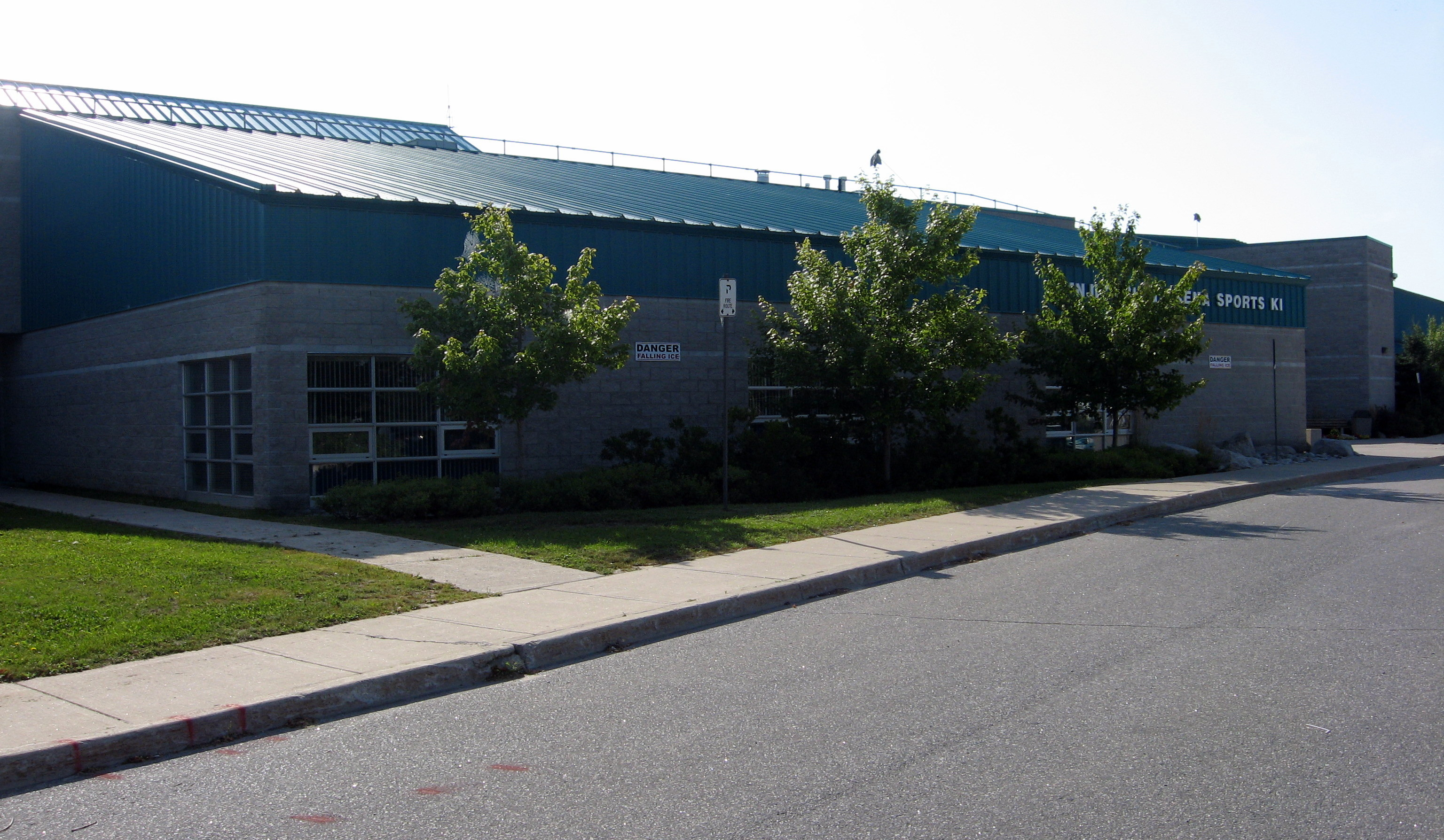
Mnjikaning Arena Sports Ki

Chippewas of Rama First Nation, also known as Chippewas of Mnjikaning and Chippewas of Rama Mnjikaning First Nation (Ojibwe: Mnjikaning Anishinaabek, also alternatively Rama Anishinaabek), is an Anishinaabe (Ojibway) First Nation located in the province of Ontario in Canada. The name Mnjikaning, or fully vocalized as Minjikaning, refers to the fishing weirs at Atherley Narrows between Lake Simcoe and Lake Couchiching and it means "in/on/at or near the fence".

Rama is one of the Williams Treaties First Nations which consists of Rama, Beausoleil, Georgina Island, Scugog Island, Curve Lake, Hiawatha and Alderville. Together these Nations have a large Treaty area comprising Treaty 18, 16, 5, 20, 27, 27 1/4, Crawford Purchase and the Gunshot Treaty.

Rama sits on approximately 2,350 acres (951 ha) of land on eight separate parcels. It was once known as Mnjikaning and Rama Mnjikaning but after a community referendum has since re-assumed the name of Chippewas of Rama First Nation. There are 2100 members with approximately 1200 living on the reserve and about 900 living off the reserve.

The First Nation is adjacent to a 4,500-year-old wooden stake fishing weir system which at one time sustained many Native peoples but it is not clear who actually built this structure. The First Nation's main reserve, the 908.4 hectares (2,245 acres) Mnjikaning First Nation 32 Indian Reserve, is located approximately 5 kilometres (3 mi) northeast of Orillia, Ontario. Rama First Nation is geographically located within the Township of Ramara, but functions separately. Rama First Nation is also home to 195,000-square-foot (18,100 m^{2}) Casino Rama and Entertainment Complex.

The people are descendants of the Chippewas of Lakes Huron and Simcoe (19th century) and were part of the Coldwater (1836) experiment before settling on the eastern shores of Lake Couchiching. While the ancestors used clan markings/drawings for signatures, original family names were replaced with English names.

== History/Origins ==
=== 18th century ===
Arriving to the area during the Great Anishinaabe migration, the Chippewas of Lakes Huron and Simcoe briefly migrated north during conflict with the Haudenosaunee during the Beaver Wars. Following resolution of the Beaver Wars and the creation of the Dish With One Spoon Wampum Belt, the Chippewas of Lakes Huron and Simcoe returned to Mnjikaning. The Chippewas of Lakes Huron and Simcoe occupied, at their greatest known extent, the lands surrounding Lake Simcoe and the Holland River watershed, extending westwards to encompass roughly present-day Simcoe County. Their leaders began ceding their land west of the lake to the government of Upper Canada through three separate purchase agreements; the first was the Penetanguishene Bay Purchase (1798).

=== 19th century ===
The other two of the three land cession treatures were the Lake Simcoe–Lake Huron Purchase (1815) and the South Simcoe Purchase (1818). In 1828, the local Chippewas numbered approximately "550 souls" under the leadership of "Chief Yellow Head"—the same "Musquakie or Yellow Head, Chief of the Rein Deer Tribe", who was involved in the Lake Simcoe-Lake Huron Purchase and the South Simcoe Purchase. They still occupied their remaining lands about Lake Simcoe and the Holland River, and reportedly had "expressed a strong desire to be admitted to Christianity, and to adopt the habits of civilized life".

In 1830, Musquakie (William Yellowhead) and his people were induced by agents of Lieutenant Governor John Colborne to settle in two purpose-built villages, one at the Atherley Narrows between Lakes Simcoe and Couchiching, and the other at Coldwater, between which they cleared a road on his instructions. Colborne began paying the Chippewas an annuity and identified "three islands set apart for them", but it was his hope that they would soon take to farming, the village of Orillia having been established by white settlers brought there to teach them European farming techniques. In a surviving letter to Colborne dated September 1830, Yellowhead and four other leaders spoke of their gladness at receiving "the money you sent us" for clearing the road, asking however "when you can pay us the remainder". Just six years later, Lieutenant Governor Francis Bond Head persuaded the Chippewas to give up this country "[rather] than to continue [living] on it, surrounded as it was by the White Population, and consequently deprived as it was of its Game". Musquakie and his chiefs afterwards objected to this Simcoe-Coldwater Purchase, writing to Governor General Charles Bagot in 1842 that "we were not made sensible of the full purport" of the deal, which paid them only one-third of the proceeds of the sale, and complaining that "we have not received any money from the sale of the said Land". Bond Head had hidden from the Chippewas his intention to sell the land, lot by lot, to white settlers and to forward the proceeds to them as they were generated. Their petition of 1842 received a sympathetic hearing: as they had asked, the proceeds of the piecemeal sales of their former land were banked, and the Chippewas received an annual income from the interest.

As a consequence of the Simcoe-Coldwater Purchase, the Chippewas had to abandon the villages built for them by Colborne in 1830. The Coldwater band relocated to Beausoleil Island in Georgian Bay, whereas, in 1838, the main band at the Atherley Narrows relocated to Rama, where they had obtained 1600 acres of land "purchased out of their own funds" at a cost of $3,200. The population of the new settlement was calculated in 1858 to be 201 persons, and its inhabitants' annual revenue from land purchases was $1894.21. Notwithstanding this income, a government report of 1858 commented on the "lamentable" conditions of life among the Chippewas of Rama, observing that, owing to government neglect, "the log houses built for them ... being badly constructed, are all going to decay", that farming was not being taken up, and that the residents "are dragging through a life disgraceful to humanity". Indebtedness to white traders accounts for some of the settlement's early economic woes. In 1839, Musquakie and two of his chiefs wrote to the Indian Department, that, as soon as Rama was up and running, they intended "to go and hunt in order to pay our debts to those we have been so long owing".

Musquakie died on 11 January 1864. In his will, which the government declared invalid, he appointed his nephew Isaac Yellowhead to succeed him as "Head Chief of the Chippewa tribe of Indians", but it was Joseph B. Naingishkung who succeeded him.

=== 20th century ===
In the 1930s, Indian Act Electoral System created a governmental structure of an elected chief and six councillors. Canada implemented this new structure to depose hereditary chiefs and headman as leaders.

=== 21st century ===
The First Nation is a member of Ogemawahj Tribal Council, a regional Chiefs' council, and in June 2016 rejoined the Union of Ontario Indians/Anishinabek Nation. Rama is also a part of the Chippewa Tri-Council which consists of Beausoleil First Nation and the Chippewas of Georgina Island as well as descendants in Neywash (Huron-Robinson Treaty).

== Governance ==
The First Nation's leadership consists of a chief and six councillors, elected every four years. The current elected leadership (2024-2028) is Chief Ted Williams, Councillor Ted Snache, Councillor Jeremy St. Germain, Councillor Anne Harrigan, Councillor Wyatt Simcoe, Councillor Nancy King, Councillor Sarah Snake .

== Reserves ==
The Chippewa Tri-Council were once one reserve, the Coldwater Narrows Reserve established in 1830, under one principal chief, Chief Yellowhead. Further, before the Coldwater Narrows Reserve was established this group was the Chippewas of Lake Simcoe and Huron.

== Notable citizens ==
- James Bartleman, diplomat and author
- Chief Lady Bird (b. 1993), muralist and illustrator
- Glenna Matoush (b. 1946), visual artist
- Arthur Shilling (b. 1941), painter
- Neebinnaukzhik Southall (b. 1989), illustrator and advocate

== See also ==
- Casino Rama
- Mnjikaning Fish Weirs
