= William Yellowhead =

William Yellowhead Musquakie/Misquuckkey
- Born: c. 1764? Province of Quebec (now Ontario, Canada)
- Died: January 11, 1864; Rama, Upper Canada
- Spouse: Elizabeth
- Relatives: Jane Yellowhead (daughter), Isaac Yellowhead (nephew)

William Yellowhead, or "Musquakie" or "Misquuckkey" (Miskwaaki or Miskwaa-aki: Red-earth), as he was known in Ojibwe (other attested names include "Mayawassino" and "Waisowindebay" (Wezaawindibe: Yellow-head)) was the "head chief" of the Chippaweans of Lakes Huron and Simcoe and leader of the Deer clan of that people from 1817 until his death in 1864. He led his people in taking arms in defence of Upper Canada in the Upper Canada Rebellion, oversaw the sale of the bulk of their territory to the provincial government, and led them in their first attempts to adopt an agrarian way of life. Although the claims of several other persons have been advanced, it is generally believed (not necessarily correctly) that Musquakie is the origin of the name of the District Municipality of Muskoka.

== Early life and military service ==
Musquakie's father, Yellow Head, preceded him as "head chief". After Yellow Head persuaded the Ojibwe of the Home District of Upper Canada to side with the British during the War of 1812, Musquakie saw action under his father at the Battle of York in April 1813, where Musquakie sustained a facial injury from a musket ball. Yellow Head too was wounded at York, sustaining wounds of such severity that the remainder of his career was curtailed. Musquakie had taken over his father's duties by 1815, and in 1817 he formally succeeded Yellow Head as head chief.

== Land purchases ==
The early years of Musquakie's chiefship were dominated by treaty negotiations and land purchases. In 1815, as acting chief in his father's place, he participated along with John Aisance and another chief in the Lake Simcoe–Lake Huron Purchase, surrendering to the provincial government 250,000 acres of territory lying between the north shore of Kempenfelt Bay and Georgian Bay (present-day North Simcoe). In 1818, having succeeded his father the previous year, he and four other chiefs surrendered a further 1,600,000 acres of territory to the government. The area encompassed by this Lake Simcoe–Nottawasaga Purchase included the watersheds of the Holland and Nottawasaga rivers, as well as adjoining areas. Notwithstanding the surrender of this vast swathe of land, representing most of their remaining territory, Musquakie and his people reserved the right under the purchase agreement to continue to range and hunt there.

== Settlement attempt at Atherley Narrows ==
In 1828, Musquakie, Aisance and their people reportedly "expressed a strong desire to be admitted to Christianity, and to adopt the habits of civilized life". They converted to Methodism later that year (Musquakie would later become an Anglican). In 1830, Musquakie and Aisance were induced by Lieutenant Governor John Colborne and his agents to settle their people permanently in two purpose-built villages, one at Atherley Narrows between Lakes Simcoe and Couchiching, where Musquakie himself settled, and the other at Coldwater, where Aisance settled. The house built for Musquakie by the government at the Narrows, like that of Aisance at Coldwater, was the only frame house in a village otherwise made up of log houses, in recognition of his chiefly status.

As late as 1835, Colborne's agents considered that this settlement experiment was succeeding. However, Aisance was unhappy, and the change in government in 1836, which saw Francis Bond Head replace Colborne as Lieutenant Governor, soon brought the experiment to an end. Partly in response to petitions submitted by white settlers at Orillia and Coldwater, Bond Head opened talks with Musquakie and Aisance and persuaded them, along with three other chiefs including Thomas Naingishkung and Big Shilling, to leave the Simcoe-Coldwater corridor (which remained Crown land) in return for one-third of the proceeds of the anticipated sales of lots there to European settlers. In 1842, Musquakie and Aisance, along with Naingishkung, Big Shilling, Joseph Snake and another chief, wrote to Governor General Charles Bagot protesting that Bond Head had not fully explained the 1836 purchase agreement, and had, in particular, not made it clear that it did not involve an upfront, lump-sum payment, nor that the Ojibwe would receive only one-third of the sale proceeds. At their request, the proceeds of the piecemeal sales of lots in the Simcoe-Coldwater corridor were subsequently banked so that the Ojibwe could receive an annual income from the interest, to be divided three ways between Musquakie's band, Aisance's band and Snake's band on the islands of Lake Simcoe.

== Upper Canada Rebellion ==
Towards the end of 1838, Bond Head called the Chippewas of Lakes Huron and Simcoe to arms to help in keeping the peace in the wake of the Upper Canada Rebellion of 1837-38. Musquakie dutifully assembled his warriors, abandoning the autumn hunt in the process, and led them to an encampment at Holland Landing. They were soon dismissed, at which they complained "most bitterly" to government agents that the small stipend paid to them for this brief period of service was too little to offset the economic blow of having been compelled to abandon their hunting. In response to this outcry, the government approved the payment of rations to the Ojibwe until the end of February 1839.

== Settlement at Rama ==
Bond Head's call to arms had followed on the heels of the relocation of Musquakie and his band from the Narrows to a new settlement at Rama, established in 1838 on a tract of land the Ojibwe had purchased for themselves on the eastern shores of Lake Couchiching. Thomas Naingishkung and Big Shilling and their followers accompanied Musquakie to Rama. The settlement they built there is now the main reserve of the Chippewas of Rama First Nation. The situation at Rama ensured that Musquakie's last years were difficult ones. From the outset the Rama settlers were under considerable pressure from their creditors; in 1839, Musquakie, Naingishkung and Big Shilling wrote to the government that they were relying on that year's hunt to enable them "to pay our debts to those we have been so long owing", presumably white traders for the most part. Although the Chippewas of Rama still reserved the right to hunt across the extensive territory their chiefs had sold in 1815 and 1818, by 1838 European settlement was putting pressure on the game population, and the Ojibwe were also "obliged frequently to submit to irritating and extremely unjust Treatment on the Part of the neighbouring White Settlers". The settlement built for them at Rama by Bond Head's agents proved to be "badly constructed": by 1858, the buildings were reportedly "all going to decay". Musquakie complained to the Methodist leaders that their missionaries living and working at Rama were indifferent to educating his people and encouraging disobedience to the chiefs. Despite a promising start, the Ojibwe's commitment to farming fizzled out as government supervision waned in the 1840s and 1850s, and lack of production increased their debt troubles. Already by the time of his death, Musquakie had had a glimpse of the grave future challenges his people would face.

== Death ==
Having reached very advanced years—exactly how many is disputed—Musquakie died on 11 January 1864. In his will (which the government did not regard as legally binding), he appointed his nephew Isaac Yellowhead his heir and successor as "Head Chief of the Chippewa tribe of Indians", but it was Thomas Naingishkung's son, Joseph Benson Naingishkung, who was chosen to succeed him by his people.
