= John Aisance =

John Aisance Aisance
- Born: c.1790 Upper Canada, now Ontario
- Died: 1847 near Penetanguishene, Upper Canada, now Ontario
- Relatives: John (son)

John Aisance (Ojibwe name Aisance) was a chief among the Chippewas of Lakes Huron and Simcoe and leader of the Otter clan of that people from at least 1815 until his death in 1847. He participated in the Lake Simcoe–Lake Huron Purchase in 1815, served the provincial government during the Upper Canada Rebellion, and was the first and founding chief of the Beausoleil First Nation.

== Early life and land treaties ==
Aisance's father, also called Aisance, preceded him as chief and clan leader. Their identical names have created confusion and debate among historians. The family's principal territorial interests seem to have lain in Penetanguishene and the surrounding area. It was the elder Aisance, apparently, whose name is recorded among the five Ojibwe chiefs who authorized the surrender of the area to the provincial government in the Penetanguishene Bay Purchase in 1798. In 1815, the younger Aisance participated alongside two other chiefs, including Musquakie, the future head chief, in authorizing the Lake Simcoe–Lake Huron Purchase, surrendering 250,000 acres of territory extending from the Penetanguishene area to the north shore of Kempenfelt Bay (present-day North Simcoe).

== Coldwater ==
In 1817, Musquakie succeeded his father Yellow Head as head chief of the Chippewas of Lakes Huron and Simcoe. The next year, the four other chiefs authorized the Lake Simcoe–Nottawasaga Purchase, surrendering 1,600,000 acres of territory west of Lake Simcoe to the government. Aisance was not involved in this purchase—the Otter clan was represented instead by Muskigonce—which left the Ojibwe with virtually no territory of their own, although they reserved the right to continue to range and hunt across the land they had relinquished.

In 1828, the Ojibwe reportedly "expressed a strong desire to be admitted to Christianity, and to adopt the habits of civilized life". When they converted to Methodism later that year, Aisance, the foremost of Musquakie's subordinate chiefs, set an example by dismissing two of his three wives. Presumably it was now that he adopted the Christian name John. In 1830, the Ojibwe were induced by Lieutenant Governor John Colborne to settle permanently in two purpose-built villages, one at Atherley Narrows between Lakes Simcoe and Couchiching, where Musquakie settled with a part of his people, and the other at Gissinausebing, or Coldwater, where Aisance settled with the remainder of the Ojibwe. The house built for him there by the government was the only frame house in a village otherwise made up of log houses, in recognition of his chiefly status.

Although Colborne's agents considered that this settlement and "civilizing" experiment was succeeding, Aisance quickly became disillusioned with the government agents and Methodist missionaries with whom he was obliged to deal. In 1832 he even converted to Roman Catholicism, his band following suit. In 1836, Francis Bond Head replaced Colborne as Lieutenant Governor and soon brought the experiment to an end. He opened talks with Musquakie and Aisance and persuaded them to leave the Simcoe-Coldwater corridor (which had remained Crown land), enticing them with the promise of one-third of the proceeds of the anticipated sales of lots there to European settlers. In 1842, Aisance joined four other chiefs in signing Musquakie's complaint to Governor General Charles Bagot, protesting that Bond Head had not fully explained the 1836 purchase agreement, and had, in particular, not made it clear that it did not involve an upfront, lump-sum payment, nor that the Ojibwe would receive only one-third of the sale proceeds. At their request, the proceeds of the piecemeal sales of lots in the Simcoe-Coldwater corridor were subsequently banked so that the Ojibwe could receive an annual income from the interest, which they divided three ways between Musquakie's band, Aisance's band and a third band led by Joseph Snake settled on the islands of Lake Simcoe. The chiefs also claimed ongoing Ojibwe ownership of the grist mill at Coldwater, which finally passed from their hands in 1849.

== Upper Canada Rebellion ==
Towards the end of 1838, Bond Head called the Chippewas of Lakes Huron and Simcoe to arms to help keep the peace in the wake of the Upper Canada Rebellion of 1837-38. Aisance dutifully assembled twenty-one warriors, abandoning the autumn hunt in the process, and followed Musquakie to an encampment at Holland Landing. The Ojibwe were soon dismissed, at which they complained "most bitterly" to government agents that the small stipend paid to them for this brief period of service was too little to offset the economic blow of having been compelled to abandon their hunting. In response to this outcry, the government approved the payment of rations to the Ojibwe until the end of February 1839.

== Beausoleil Island ==
As a consequence of the 1836 purchase agreement with Bond Head, the Ojibwe were required to abandon the villages built for them by Colborne. In 1842, Aisance and his band left Coldwater and relocated to Beausoleil Island in Georgian Bay, a move that brought them closer to their chief's native country around Penetanguishene. Henceforth the Chippewas of Beausoleil Island conducted themselves as a distinct people from Musquakie's band, who had settled at Rama.

Under Aisance's leadership, the Beausoleil settlement prospered modestly in stark contrast to the decay that reportedly took place at Rama. The Ojibwe, numbering 232 persons in 1842, grew steadily more able at growing corn and potatoes, rearing livestock, and making sugar, and their settlement grew slowly, eventually adding a school house. Notwithstanding a promising beginning, Aisance, frustrated by the poor soils on the island (which some blamed on the Ojibwe's cultivating technique), almost immediately hatched a plan for relocating westwards to the more fertile Christian Island which the chief did not live to see come to fruition. In 1856, the Chippewas of Beausoleil Island joined "a few Pottawatamies and Ottawas" already settled on Christian Island, their arrival marking the beginnings of the present-day Beausoleil First Nation, whose main reserve is still on Christian Island.

== Death ==
John Aisance died in 1847, reportedly drowning in a canoeing accident.
