= Orillia =

- City (single-tier)
- City of Orillia
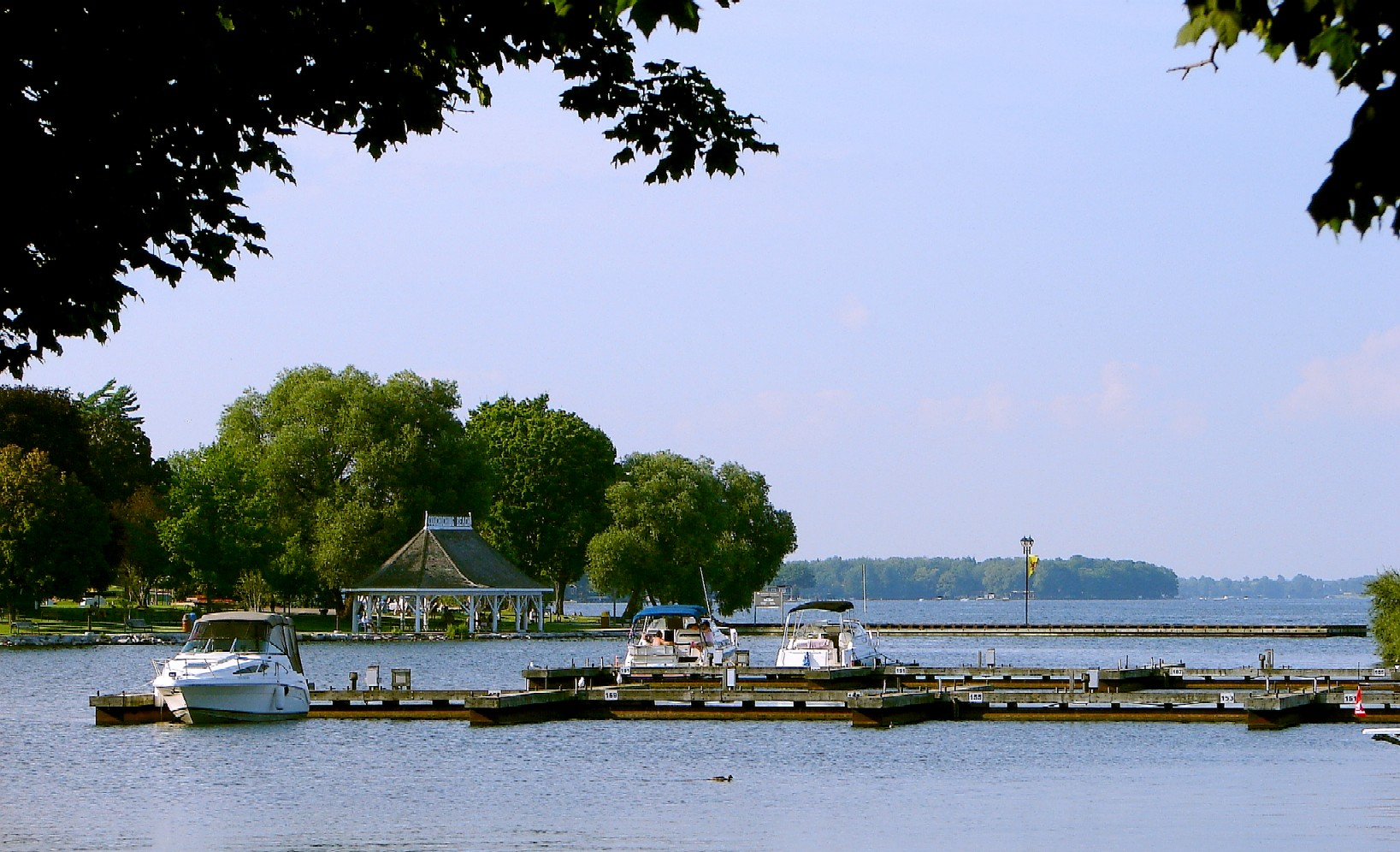
- Waterfront of Orillia

- Flag Logo
- Nickname: The Sunshine City
- Location within Southern Ontario Location within Simcoe County
- Coordinates: 44°36′15″N 79°25′26″W
- Country: Canada
- Province: Ontario
- Incorporation: 1867 (Village)
- Incorporation: 1875 (Town)
- Incorporation: 1969 (City)

Government
  - Mayor: Donald McIsaac

Area
  - Land: 28.53 km^{2} (11.02 sq mi)
- Elevation: 219.50 m (720.1 ft)

Population (2021)
  - Total: 33,411
  - Density: 1,171.1/km^{2} (3,033/sq mi)
- Time zone: UTC−05:00 (EST)
  - Summer (DST): UTC−04:00 (EDT)
- Forward Sortation Area: L3V
- Area code: 705 / 249
- Website: www.orillia.ca

Orillia (/əˈrɪliə/) is a city in Ontario, Canada, about 30 km (18 mi) north-east of Barrie in Simcoe County. It is located at the confluence of Lake Couchiching and Lake Simcoe. Although it is geographically located within Simcoe County, the city is a single-tier municipality. It is part of the Huronia region of Central Ontario. The population in 2021 was 33,411.

It was incorporated as a village in 1867, but the history of what is today the City of Orillia dates back at least several thousand years. Archaeologists have uncovered evidence of fishing by the Huron and Iroquois peoples in the area over 4,000 years ago, and of sites used by Indigenous peoples for hundreds of years for trading, hunting, and fishing.

Known as the "Sunshine City", the city's large waterfront attracts many tourists to the area every year, as do a number of annual festivals and other cultural attractions. While the area's largest employer is Casino Rama, overall economic activity in Orillia is a mixture of many different industries including manufacturing, government services, customer service and tourism.

Orillia is located on the shores of two connected lakes: Lake Simcoe and Lake Couchiching. Both lakes are part of the Trent-Severn Waterway. Travel north on Lake Couchiching, then through three locks and the only marine railway (Big Chute Marine Railway) still in use in North America leads to Georgian Bay on Lake Huron. Travel south-east across Lake Simcoe, through many locks (including two of the highest hydraulic lift locks in the world, Peterborough Lift Lock and Kirkfield Lift Lock) eventually leads to Lake Ontario. From either of these Great Lakes one can connect to the St. Lawrence and thence to the Atlantic Ocean.

== History ==
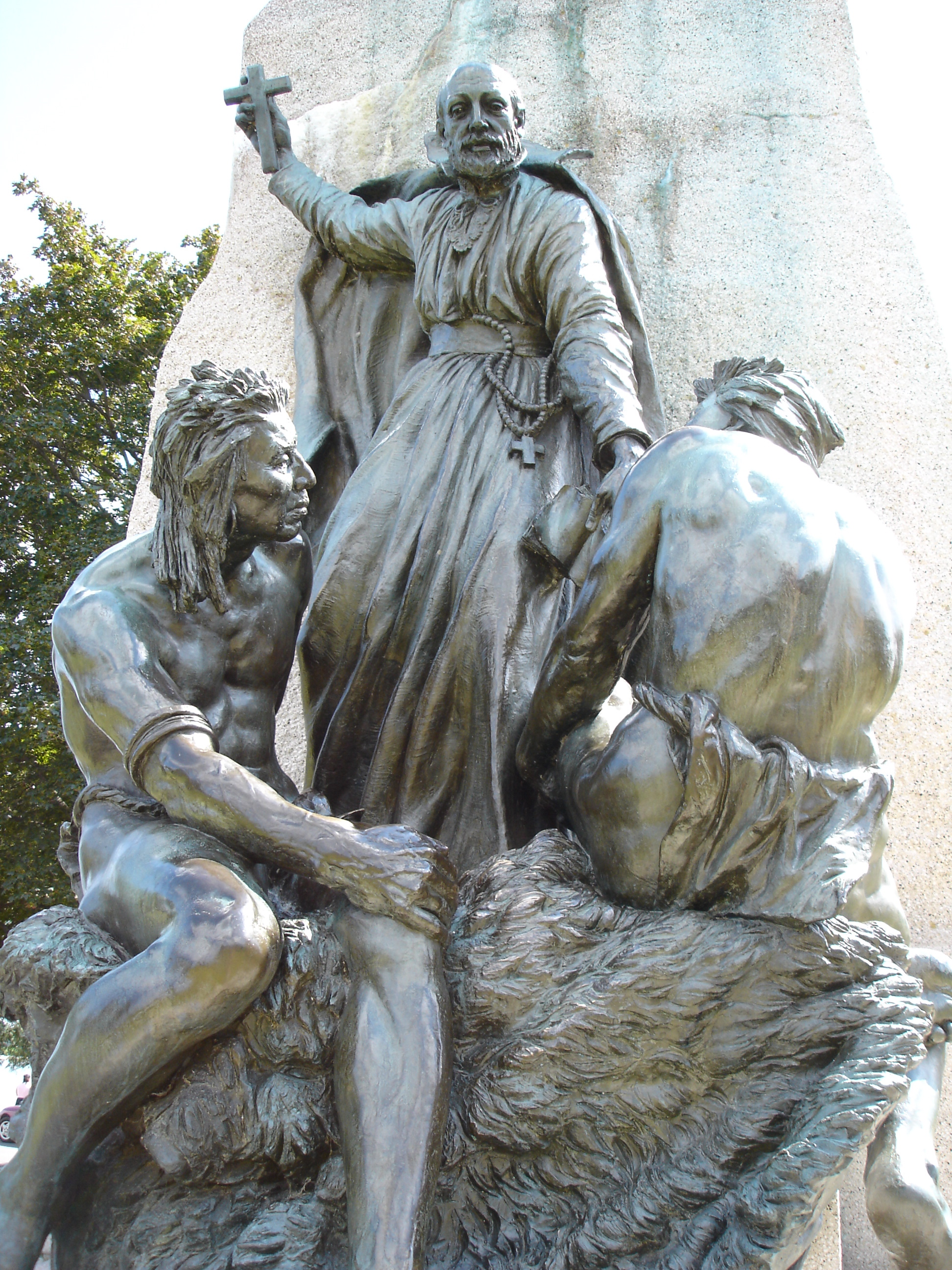
The Christian missionary portion of the Samuel de Champlain monument designed by Vernon March in Orillia

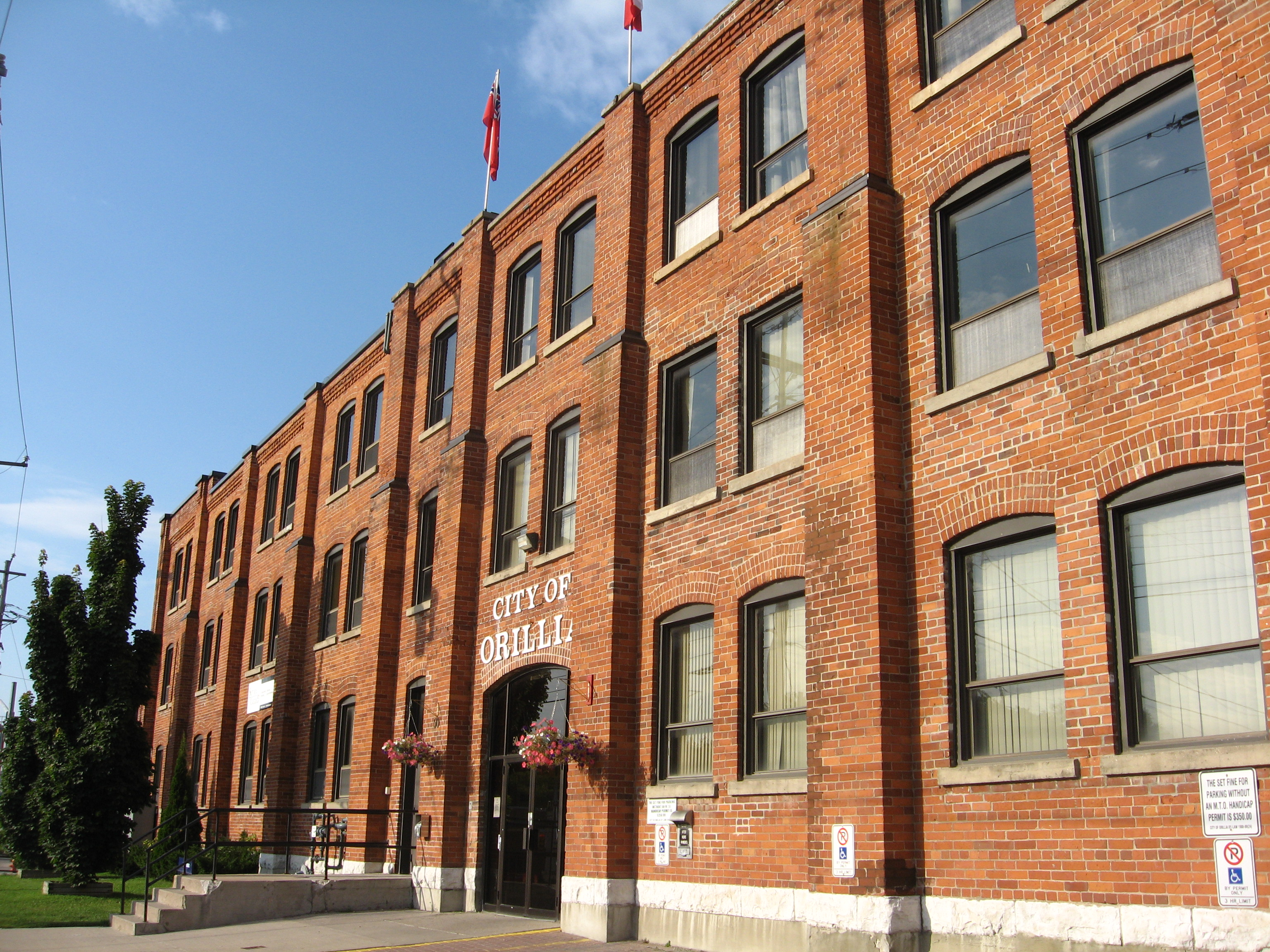
Orillia City Hall

The human history of the area extends back several thousand years: in the "Narrows", a small waterway that connects Lake Couchiching and Lake Simcoe, there is marine archaeological evidence of ancient fishing weirs used by Huron and Iroquois people to trap fish over 4,000 years ago. Also, there are several archaeological sites in the surrounding area that provide evidence of trading, fishing, and hunting camps that were visited for hundreds of years by Indigenous people. The Mnjikaning Fish Weirs are believed to be the original source of the Name of Toronto; the weirs were known as ouentaronk by the Huron people and tkaronto by the Mohawk, and due to the site's importance as a site of trade between the indigenous peoples and the colonial French settlers, the name came to be transferred first to the Toronto Carrying-Place Trail river and portage route from the weirs to Lake Ontario, then to Fort Toronto near the route's end at Lake Ontario, and finally to the civilian settlement that grew around the fort.

Although the site of what is now Orillia was originally a settlement of the Huron-Wendat people, it was later inhabited by the Ojibwe people, who settled the land under the leadership of Chief William Yellowhead. The Ojibwe people remained on the land until the arrival of European settlers.

Also of historical note, the French explorer Samuel de Champlain visited the area that would later become Orillia in the summer of 1615, travelling over what would become the Coldwater Road centuries later; it was used by the Hurons, Ojibways, French, and British as a fur-trading route. Champlain spent the winter with the Hurons in their chief village of Cahiague (near the current Warminster). Ecole Samuel de Champlain, a local francophone elementary school, is named in his honour.

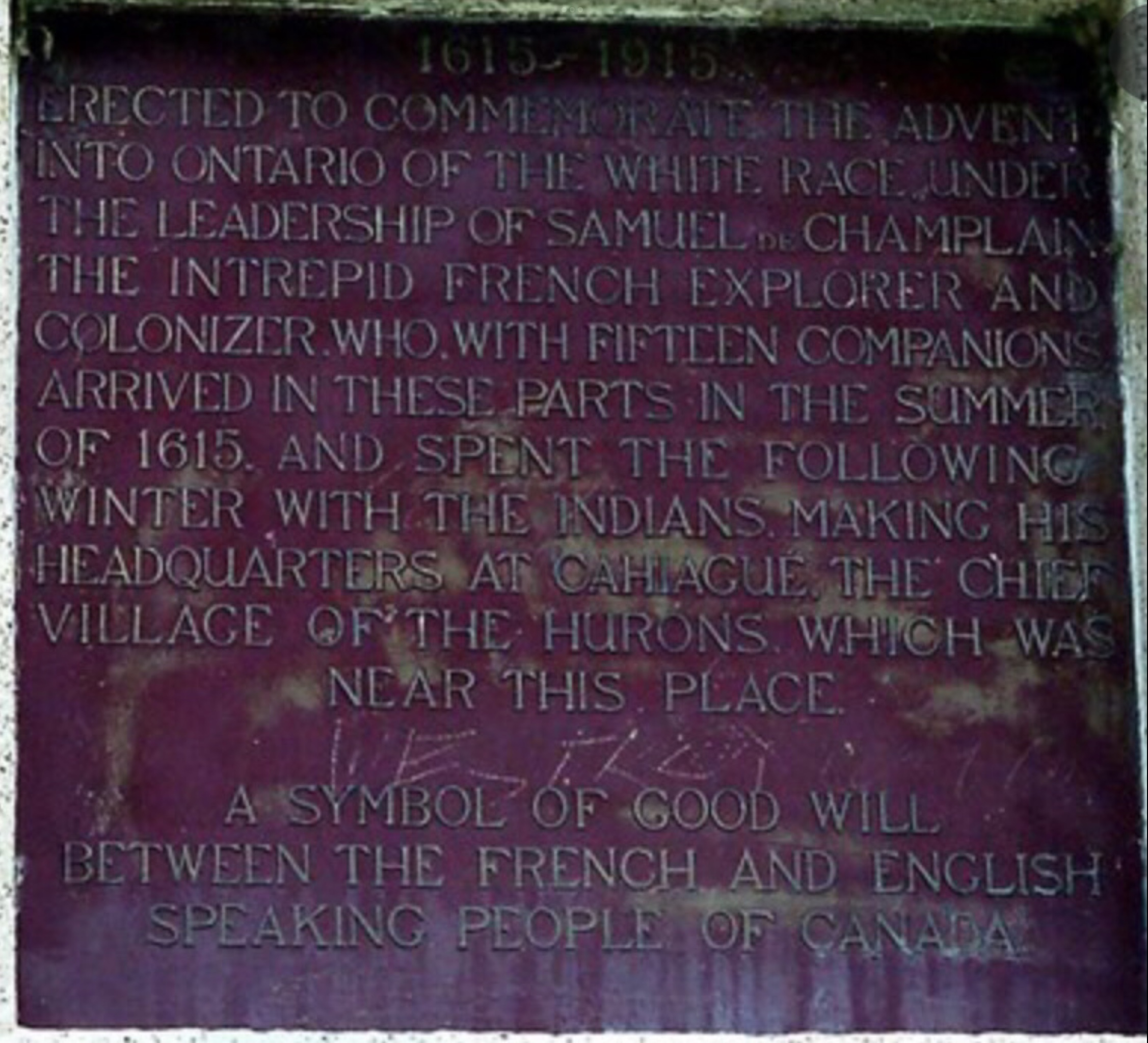
To commemorate the advent of the white race in Ontario.

In 1909, a monument to Samuel de Champlain with several other figures was installed in Couchiching Beach Park as a National Historic Site of Canada. In 2017 it was removed by Parks Canada for refurbishment. The vacant plinth then began to raise public debate about whether the eventual reinstallation of the monument ought to continue in light of a general growing public awareness that it may no longer be appropriate to have Champlain’s figure towering over four Indigenous figures prostrated at the ground below him. The plaque was significant too. “ERECTED TO COMMEMORATE THE ADVENT TO ONTARIO OF THE WHITE RACE….” Discussions through municipal council led to working groups suggesting a different placement of the figures and modernised descriptions on signage. Causing great controversy in the community and indeed national newspapers, as of July 2026, the seven statues of the monument are in ‘neutral’ storage indefinitely until a decision or compromise can be reached.

The government signed treaties with the Hurons in 1798, 1815, and 1818 to gain land to the north and west of Lake Simcoe and then made grants to military veterans. In 1840, the government bought additional land from the First Nations and laid out the settlement of Orillia. The population in 1846 was about 200. The settlement had a church, a post office, four stores, three taverns, a tannery, two blacksmiths, four shoemakers, a tailor, and two furniture makers. A grist mill could be found about a mile away.

In 1869, the population was 1200. Construction of the Monck Road began in 1866 and was completed in 1873. A 100-mile stretch allowed for travel to Bancroft, Ontario where other roads could be found for travel to Ottawa.

Transportation links with Toronto and Georgian Bay stimulated Orillia's development as a commercial centre and summer resort. The village of Orillia was incorporated in 1867 (sharing the same birth year as Canada). By 1875, the population was 2,000 and Orillia became a town with a mayor, reeve, deputy reeve, and nine councillors. Orillia was designated a city in 1969.

In Stephen Leacock's 1912 book Sunshine Sketches of a Little Town, Orillia was used as the basis for the fictional town known as "Mariposa", although Leacock stated that the fictional town could really be any town. The book was based on Leacock's experiences in the town and since the book's release, the city has attempted to mimic the fictional location in as many ways as possible. The Leacock Museum and National Historic Site, located in Orillia, is one of the National Historic Sites of Canada.

William E. Bell's 1989 novel Five Days of the Ghost was also set in Orillia, with many readers recognizing popular local spots, including the Guardian Angels Catholic Church, the Samuel de Champlain statue in Couchiching Beach Park as well as Chiefs Island in the middle of Lake Couchiching.

Orillia was the first municipality in North America to introduce daylight saving time and had the first municipal hydroelectric transmission plant in North America.

=== Toponymy ===
The first recorded use of the name to describe the region, which until then had no officially sanctioned designation, was in 1820 when the name was given in York, Upper Canada by then Lieutenant-Governor Sir Peregrine Maitland. Maitland was a veteran of the British campaign against the French in Spain, called the Peninsular War, during the Napoleonic Wars where he served under the command of the Duke of Wellington.

While there are no records clearly indicating the reason for the name Orillia, the most common explanation holds that the name originates in the Spanish, "orilla," which can mean the shore of either a lake or river. The Spanish pronunciation sounds much like, "oreeya," and since the word itself is spelled almost identically to Orillia, without the second, "i," it has come to be commonly accepted as the source word for the city's name. Further backing the theory of a Spanish origin are the names of surrounding communities and landmarks, which include Oro for gold, Mariposa for butterfly, and Mono for monkey. Historical documents contain a second spelling of the name which was never officially recognised, Aurelia, which when pronounced sounds similar to the name and is considered a clerical error.

== Demographics ==
Orillia Historical populations
Year	Pop.	±%
1841	200	—
1871	1,322	+561.0%
1881	2,911	+120.2%
1891	4,752	+63.2%
1901	4,907	+3.3%
1911	6,828	+39.1%
1921	8,774	+28.5%
1931	8,183	−6.7%
1941	9,705	+18.6%
1951	12,110	+24.8%
1961	15,345	+26.7%
1971	24,040	+56.7%
1981	23,955	−0.4%
1991	25,925	+8.2%
1996	27,846	+7.4%
2001	29,121	+4.6%
2006	30,259	+3.9%
2011	30,586	+1.1%
2016	31,166	+1.9%
2021	33,411	+7.2%

In the 2021 Census of Population conducted by Statistics Canada, Orillia had a population of 33,411 living in 14,422 of its 15,428 total private dwellings, a change of 7.2% from its 2016 population of 31,166. With a land area of 28.53 km^{2} (11.02 sq mi), it had a population density of 1,171.1/km^{2} (3,033.1/sq mi) in 2021.

The median household income in 2015 for Orillia was $55,802, which is below the Ontario provincial average of $74,287.

Canada census – Orillia community profile

	2021	2016	2011
Population	33,411 (+7.2% from 2016)	31,166 (+1.9% from 2011)	30,586 (+1.1% from 2006)
Land area	28.53 km^{2} (11.02 sq mi)	28.58 km^{2} (11.03 sq mi)	28.61 km^{2} (11.05 sq mi)
Population density	1,171.1/km^{2} (3,033/sq mi)	1,090.3/km^{2} (2,824/sq mi)	1,069.2/km^{2} (2,769/sq mi)
Median age	46.8 (M: 44, F: 49.6)	47.0 (M: 44.4, F: 49.3)
Private dwellings	14,420 (total)	14,287 (total)	13,863 (total)
Median household income		$55,802

References: 2021 2016 2011

Panethnic groups in the City of Orillia (2001–2021)
Panethnic group	2021		2016		2011		2006		2001	
Panethnic group	Pop.	%	Pop.	%	Pop.	%	Pop.	%	Pop.	%
European (Note: Statistic includes all persons that did not make up part of a visible minority or an indigenous identity.)	27,920	86.51%	26,595	88.78%	26,675	90.41%	26,620	91.26%	26,270	93.4%
Indigenous	1,975	6.12%	1,835	6.13%	1,415	4.8%	1,325	4.54%	860	3.06%
South Asian	590	1.83%	305	1.02%	390	1.32%	260	0.89%	150	0.53%
Southeast Asian (Note: Statistic includes total responses of "Filipino" and "Southeast Asian" under visible minority section on census.)	515	1.6%	385	1.29%	380	1.29%	315	1.08%	245	0.87%
East Asian (Note: Statistic includes total responses of "Chinese", "Korean", and "Japanese" under visible minority section on census.)	465	1.44%	460	1.54%	375	1.27%	375	1.29%	205	0.73%
African	405	1.25%	200	0.67%	135	0.46%	70	0.24%	220	0.78%
Middle Eastern (Note: Statistic includes total responses of "West Asian" and "Arab" under visible minority section on census.)	105	0.33%	45	0.15%	40	0.14%	135	0.46%	20	0.07%
Latin American	105	0.33%	35	0.12%	115	0.39%	30	0.1%	10	0.04%
Other (Note: Statistic includes total responses of "Visible minority, n.i.e." and "Multiple visible minorities" under visible minority section on census.)	185	0.57%	90	0.3%	55	0.19%	15	0.05%	75	0.27%
Total responses	32,275	96.6%	29,955	96.11%	29,505	96.47%	29,170	96.4%	28,125	96.58%
Total population	33,411	100%	31,166	100%	30,586	100%	30,259	100%	29,121	100%
Note: Totals greater than 100% due to multiple origin responses

== Government ==
Orillia is governed by the Orillia City Council, which consists of eight city councillors and a mayor.

There are four wards in the city.

From 1875 to 1969, the council was led by a reeve or mayor. Since 1969 the head of the council is the mayor.

== Grape Island ==
Grape Island is a lake island located off Victoria Point in the north end of Lake Simcoe.

Today the island is occupied by about 40 private homes or cottages and residences are part of the Grape Island Property Owners Association (c. 1952). Access is restricted to residents of the island with access by boat from Forest Avenue South dock to private docks on the island. The heavy traffic at the mainland docks have resulted in tensions between island residents and residents of Victoria Point. The city of Orillia is working on finding a solution for access to the island without inconveniencing residents in Victoria Point.

There are no vehicular roads on the island. Only Ivy Lane, a road allowance, serves as path to homes on the island. Water taxi is the main means of transportation to the island (unless residents have their own private vessels) from the GIPOA-owned mainland dock to the island dock (on a vacant lot).

== Economy ==
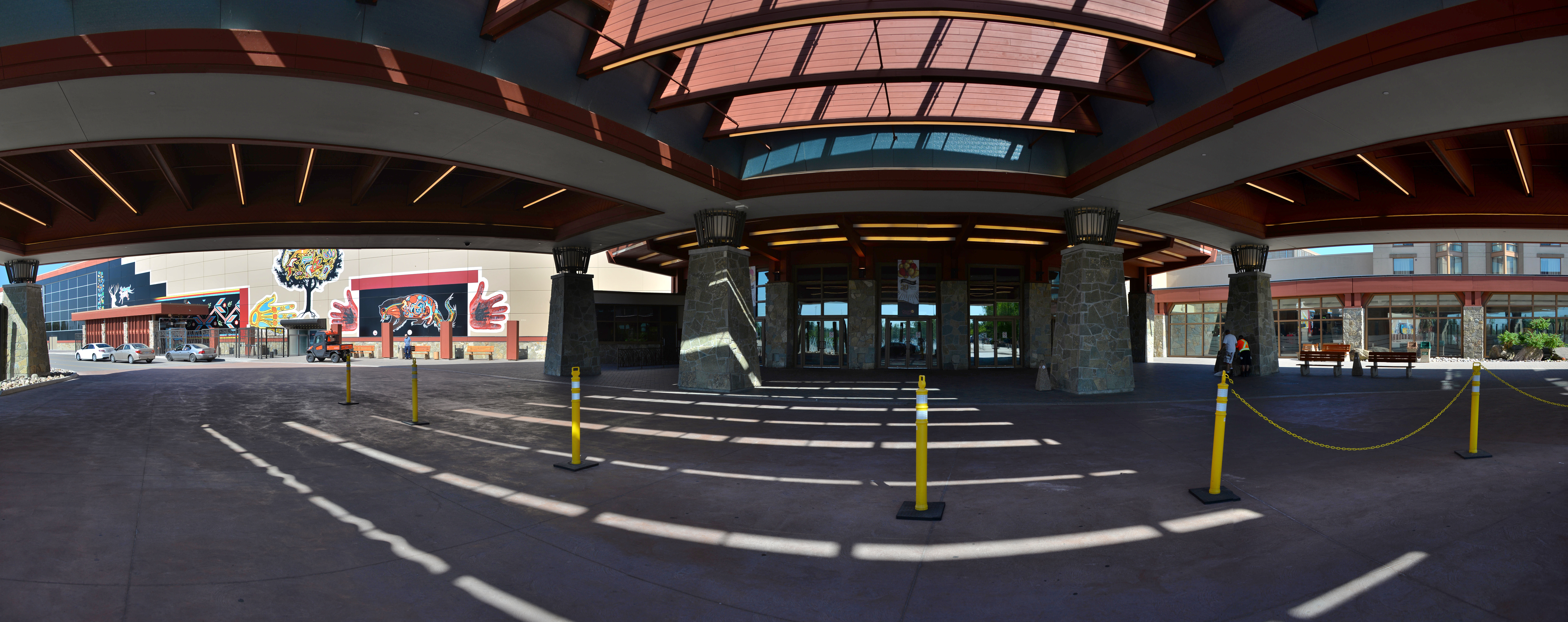
Front entrance of the Casino Rama in Orillia

Initial interest in Orillia came from fur traders who used the gathering place at the Narrows to do business with the many tribes that came there each spring and fall. Subsequently, Orillia's economics has ranged from farming (even downtown) to machinery, to automobiles and even one of the first "campers" (a pop-up tent in a car).

Economic activity in Orillia is a mix of manufacturing, government services, customer service, and tourism. The largest employer in the area is Casino Rama, located in the nearby reserve land of the Chippewas of Rama First Nation. Manufacturing operations in the city include CCI Thermal Technologies (industrial heaters and heating components), Dorr-Oliver Eimco (industrial equipment), Kubota Metal Corporation (petrochemical industry components), Parker Hannifin (moulded rubber products), Pliant Corporation (components for the packaging industry), Smiths Aerospace Components (aerospace industry machining), and TI Group Automotive Systems (automotive components). Call centre Tele Tech Canada also employs approximately 850 people. The Central Operations Headquarters for Ontario Provincial Police is located in Orillia on Memorial Drive along with the regional headquarters.

Heywood-Wakefield seating, which operated from the early 20th century, announced it was closing its doors in September 2007. In late July 2009, Parker Hannifin announced that they were shutting down their operations in Orillia at the end of the year.

G.W.B. Rope & Twine, which was one of the foremost North American producers of braided rope from 1973 to 1985, was also the inventor of the automotive grocery or cargo restraint net. The net was introduced with the launch of the Ford Taurus at Christmas 1985, and shortly thereafter the company was sold and became Polytech Netting Industries, which employed several hundred people until moving to Mexico in 1996–97. G.W.B. Rope and Twine's founders, Gordon W. Brown and family, launched G&B Ropes in 1990. (Their son Sean Brown worked with G&B Ropes until it transferred ownership around 1998. Sean Brown then assisted in the development of Orillia's newest rope-making business, Redpoint Ropes.)

Large public-sector employers include the headquarters for the Ontario Provincial Police, which is located in Orillia. The Huronia Regional Centre, formerly an asylum that later became an institution to house disabled people, was one of the area's largest employers for many decades until the de-institutionalization movement of the 1980s and 1990s.

== Recreation and culture ==
Orillia is known as the "Sunshine City", taking the moniker from its role as the fictional "Mariposa" in the book Sunshine Sketches of a Little Town by Stephen Leacock. Many local businesses also use "Mariposa" in their names.

The city council has actively restricted the construction of large buildings downtown and seeks to maintain a certain "small town" look with regard to signs and decorations. However, in 2017, plans were further discussed to redevelop the waterfront district and other areas underdeveloped or otherwise vacant. A 3D model was developed at the local Royal Canadian Legion to reflect the possible future and is to be on display in city hall.

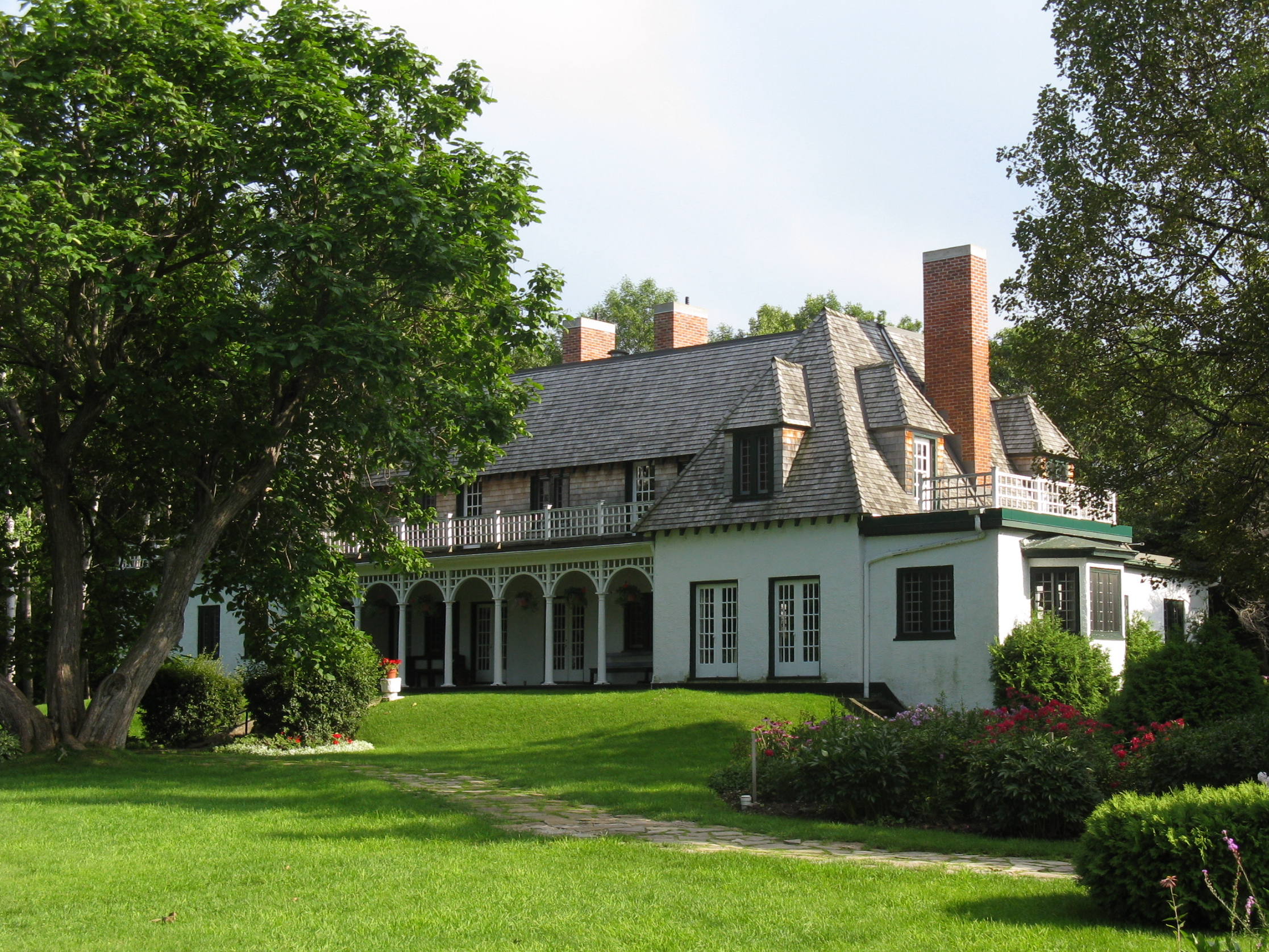
Leacock Museum and National Historic Site

Orillia's "Arts District" is located on Peter St. S., between Mississauga St. E. and Colborne St. E., and is home to a variety of art galleries, fine dining and shops. At its centre is the Orillia Museum of Art & History, considered the hub of art and culture for the city, playing an instrumental role in municipal cultural events.

The museum occupies all four floors of the historic Sir Sam Steele Building, a landmark destination for both residents and visitors. A collection of over 10,000 artefacts of regional historical significance features in a rotating exhibits schedule. On a separate floor is contemporary art space with exhibits featuring regional and international artists. The museum also features a designated education space and hosts activities including art-making and interpretive programming for children, artists, artisans, historians, etc.

Many tourists and boaters are attracted to the city each year because of its waterfront park Couchiching Beach Park/Centennial Park/Port of Orillia and its position as a gateway to Lake Country, cottage country in Muskoka, Algonquin Provincial Park, the Trent–Severn Waterway, and other natural attractions. The city's waterfront has an extensive lakeshore boardwalk, a large park with two beaches, several playgrounds, an outdoor theatre, a touring ferry, and a children's train.

The city of Orillia also is home to a large number of retirement homes (currently nine, with four more under construction). As such, it is often characterized as a "retirement community", although less than 18% of the city's population is actually over 65 (see below).

Orillia is home to an annual Perch Fishing Festival. Perch are netted, tagged, and released into the local lake, to be caught for prize money. This event also includes a large social gathering consisting of a "perch fry". Other popular annual festivals include the Leacock Festival, Blues Festival, Jazz Festival, Scottish Festival, and Beatles Festival.

The Port of Orillia holds an annual "Christmas in June", which includes a boat decorating contest and turkey buffet. Boat and cottage shows are held in June and August.

Orillia also hosts an annual Canada Day event at Couchiching Beach Park. The day begins with a traditional pancake breakfast served by the Mayor and Council, and ends with a large fireworks display at dusk.

Orillia is the original site of the popular Mariposa Folk Festival. Beginning in 1961, it is (as of 2024) the longest-running folk festival in Canada.

The Stephen Leacock Associates have honoured former Orillia resident and humourist Stephen Leacock's memory since 1947 with the annual Stephen Leacock Memorial Medal for Humour, awarded to the best Canadian humorous book published the previous year. The Leacock Medal Gala and Award ceremony is held each June at nearby Geneva Park, with tickets for sale to the public.

The Royal Canadian Legion sponsors a yearly Scottish Festival at Couchiching Beach Park and Centennial Park in July each year. Marching bands from around the country participate.

Since 1963, the Webers hamburger restaurant has been approximately 1 km north of Orillia, next to Ontario Highway 11.

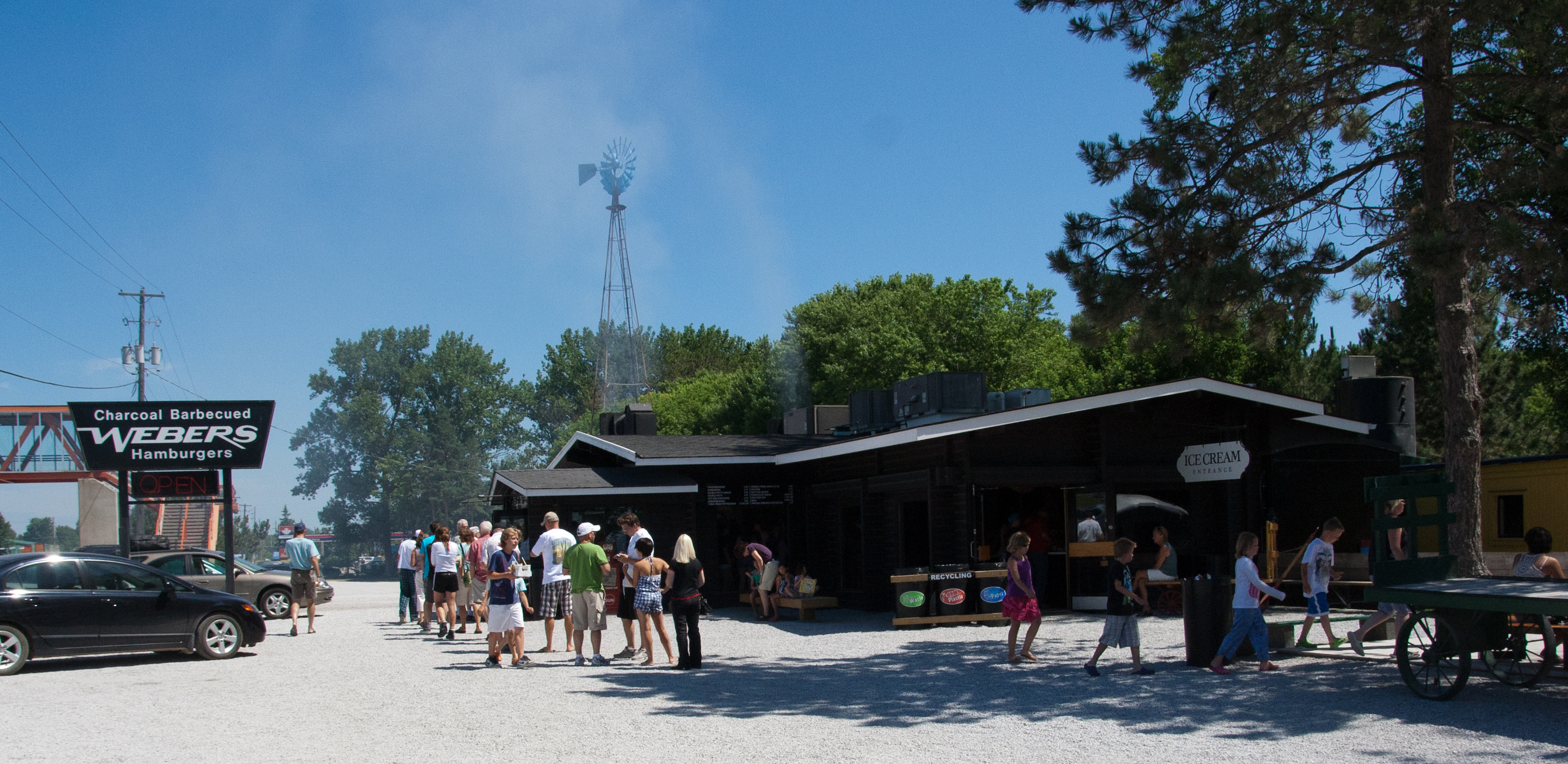
Webers hamburger restaurant

Lake St. George Golf Club is ten minutes north of Orillia.

== Education ==
Both French and English public education is offered in Orillia.

There is one Catholic French-language elementary school, École élémentaire catholique Samuel-de-Champlain, operated by the Conseil scolaire de district catholique Centre-Sud.

Students from this elementary school attend École secondaire catholique Nouvelle-Alliance, which is operated by the same board and is located in Barrie.

English public education in Orillia is provided via the Simcoe County District School Board, which has nine elementary and three secondary schools in the city. The secondary schools are Twin Lakes Secondary School and Orillia Secondary School, formerly OD/Park Secondary School and created by the amalgamation of Orillia District Collegiate and Vocational Institute and Park Street Collegiate Institute. The schools joined together in the summer of 2013. There is also an alternative secondary school, known as OASIS.

Publicly funded Catholic English-language education is available via the Simcoe Muskoka Catholic District School Board through four elementary schools and one secondary school, Patrick Fogarty Catholic Secondary School.

Private schools include the Orillia Christian School.

There are two post-secondary institutions that are based in Orillia. The Orillia campus of Georgian College formerly offered applied arts and technology programmes to 1,600 students before its closure in April 2026. Lakehead University operates a small campus downtown, with the main campus on University Ave. The Orillia campus opened in the downtown in 2006 and the campus on University Ave. opened in September 2010. The Lakehead University campus located on University Avenue is the first in North America that has been built to meet all LEED (Leadership in Energy and Environmental Design) certification standards.

There is also an Adult Learning Centre, where adults may upgrade to receive high school diplomas.

== Health care ==
The Orillia Soldiers' Memorial Hospital is a 230-bed hospital in the city. Opened in 1908 as the 20-bed Orillia General Hospital, it took its current name in 1922 to honour those who died fighting in World War I. Orillia Soldiers’ Memorial Hospital celebrated its 100th anniversary on May 28, 2008. The hospital is located at 170 Colborne Street West, Orillia, ON L3V 2Z3.

== Transit ==
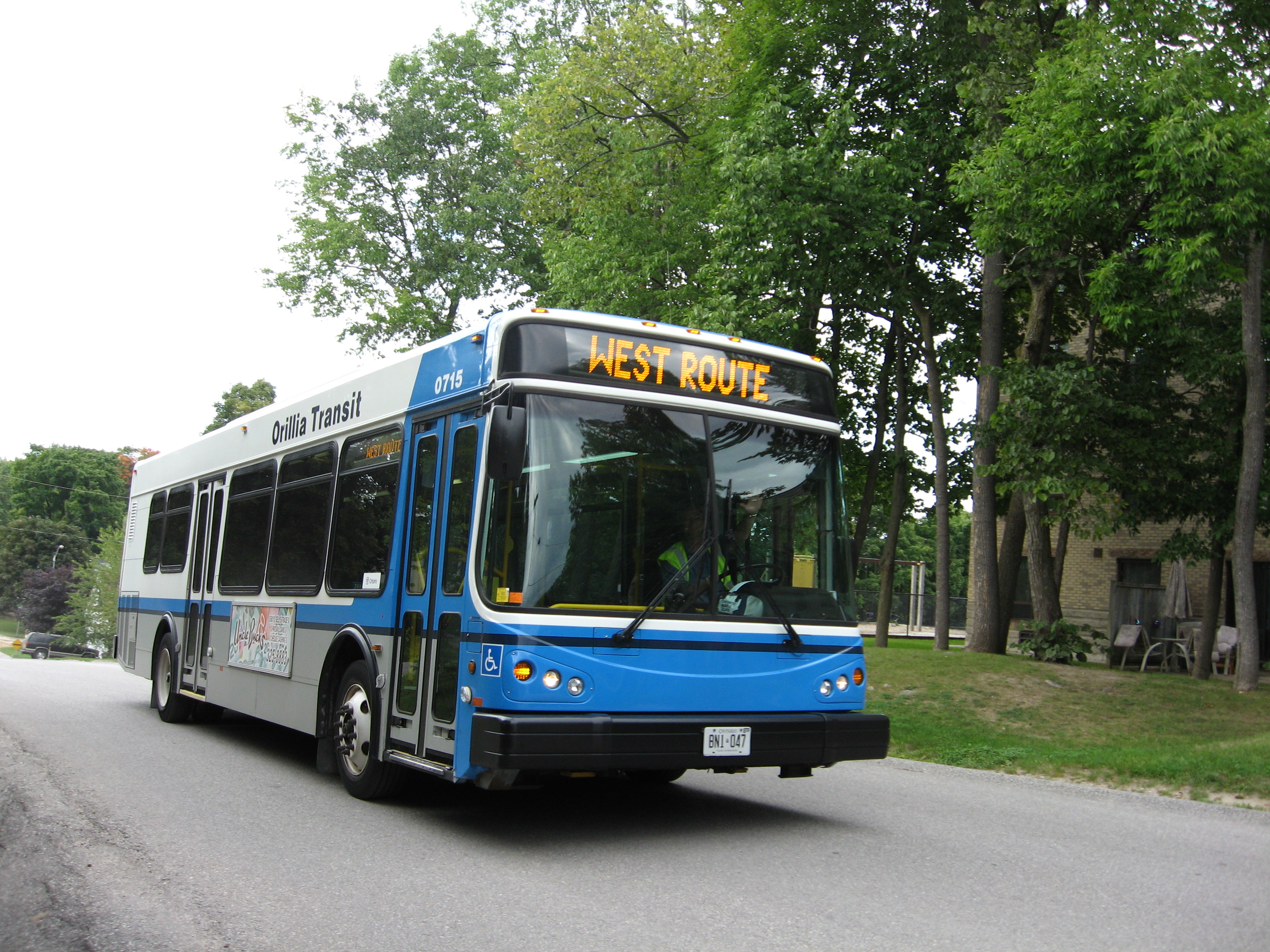
An Orillia Transit bus

Orillia Transit provides service on five routes throughout the city. All of these routes run on loops which depart and end at the downtown bus terminal at the intersection of West and Mississaga Streets, in front of the Orillia Public Library and Opera House. Orillia Transit services commence at 6:15 a.m., ending at 10:15 p.m. on weekdays with all final departures from the terminal and shorter operating hours on weekends with no holiday service.

In August 2019, Simcoe County LINX began a bus route that connects Orillia with Barrie on weekdays, excluding statutory holidays.

Ontario Northland provides intercity bus service, connecting Orillia to Toronto, Barrie, North Bay and Sudbury, among other destinations. The bus stop was originally located at the site of the former train station, but was moved to the Knights Inn on Front Street in 2020, and subsequently moved to the Orillia Transit terminal in 2024.

Orillia was once a stop for the Northlander train but re-routing resulted in termination of service. The station that served the Northlander still exists but re-adapted for commercial use.

== Climate ==
Climate data for Orillia
Month	Jan	Feb	Mar	Apr	May	Jun	Jul	Aug	Sep	Oct	Nov	Dec	Year
Record high °C (°F)	10.0 (50.0)	13.0 (55.4)	23.0 (73.4)	29.5 (85.1)	32.5 (90.5)	34.0 (93.2)	37.5 (99.5)	34.0 (93.2)	32.5 (90.5)	27.0 (80.6)	21.5 (70.7)	17.0 (62.6)	37.5 (99.5)
Mean daily maximum °C (°F)	−3.6 (25.5)	−2.7 (27.1)	2.9 (37.2)	10.7 (51.3)	18.2 (64.8)	22.5 (72.5)	25.7 (78.3)	24.2 (75.6)	19.3 (66.7)	12.2 (54.0)	5.8 (42.4)	−0.7 (30.7)	11.2 (52.2)
Daily mean °C (°F)	−8.4 (16.9)	−7.7 (18.1)	−2.1 (28.2)	5.7 (42.3)	12.9 (55.2)	17.1 (62.8)	20.6 (69.1)	19.4 (66.9)	14.8 (58.6)	8.2 (46.8)	2.2 (36.0)	−4.8 (23.4)	6.5 (43.7)
Mean daily minimum °C (°F)	−13.1 (8.4)	−12.6 (9.3)	−7.0 (19.4)	0.8 (33.4)	7.5 (45.5)	11.5 (52.7)	15.5 (59.9)	14.6 (58.3)	10.2 (50.4)	3.9 (39.0)	−1.3 (29.7)	−8.8 (16.2)	1.8 (35.2)
Record low °C (°F)	−37.0 (−34.6)	−37.0 (−34.6)	−30.0 (−22.0)	−15.0 (5.0)	−3.5 (25.7)	0.5 (32.9)	7.0 (44.6)	4.0 (39.2)	−3.0 (26.6)	−6.0 (21.2)	−9.0 (15.8)	−35.0 (−31.0)	−37.0 (−34.6)
Average precipitation mm (inches)	103.1 (4.06)	68.1 (2.68)	71.3 (2.81)	72.2 (2.84)	77.6 (3.06)	76.4 (3.01)	77.4 (3.05)	102.4 (4.03)	95.5 (3.76)	89.7 (3.53)	102.5 (4.04)	107.3 (4.22)	1,043.2 (41.07)
Average rainfall mm (inches)	13.9 (0.55)	15.4 (0.61)	38.4 (1.51)	60.9 (2.40)	77.3 (3.04)	76.4 (3.01)	77.4 (3.05)	102.4 (4.03)	95.3 (3.75)	86.5 (3.41)	77.1 (3.04)	29.6 (1.17)	750.6 (29.55)
Average snowfall cm (inches)	89.2 (35.1)	59.6 (23.5)	32.9 (13.0)	11.3 (4.4)	0.4 (0.2)	0 (0)	0 (0)	0 (0)	0 (0)	3.2 (1.3)	25.4 (10.0)	77.7 (30.6)	292.6 (115.2)
Average precipitation days (≥ 0.2 mm)	16.9	11.8	12.4	12.0	12.8	11.7	9.8	12.5	13.6	15.3	15.7	16.9	161.3
Average rainy days (≥ 0.2 mm)	2.6	2.3	6.5	10.6	12.7	11.7	9.8	12.5	13.6	15.0	12.3	4.5	114.2
Average snowy days (≥ 0.2 cm)	14.8	10.2	6.5	2.2	0.17	0	0	0	0	0.73	4.7	13.4	52.7
Source: Environment Canada

== Environmental awareness ==
In 2012, Orillia won the highest municipal honour for its waste diversion efforts. The City of Orillia had a waste diversion rate of 61% in 2011. The Recycling Council of Ontario awarded the city its highest award, the Platinum Municipal Diversion Award.

== Ontario Provincial Police headquarters ==
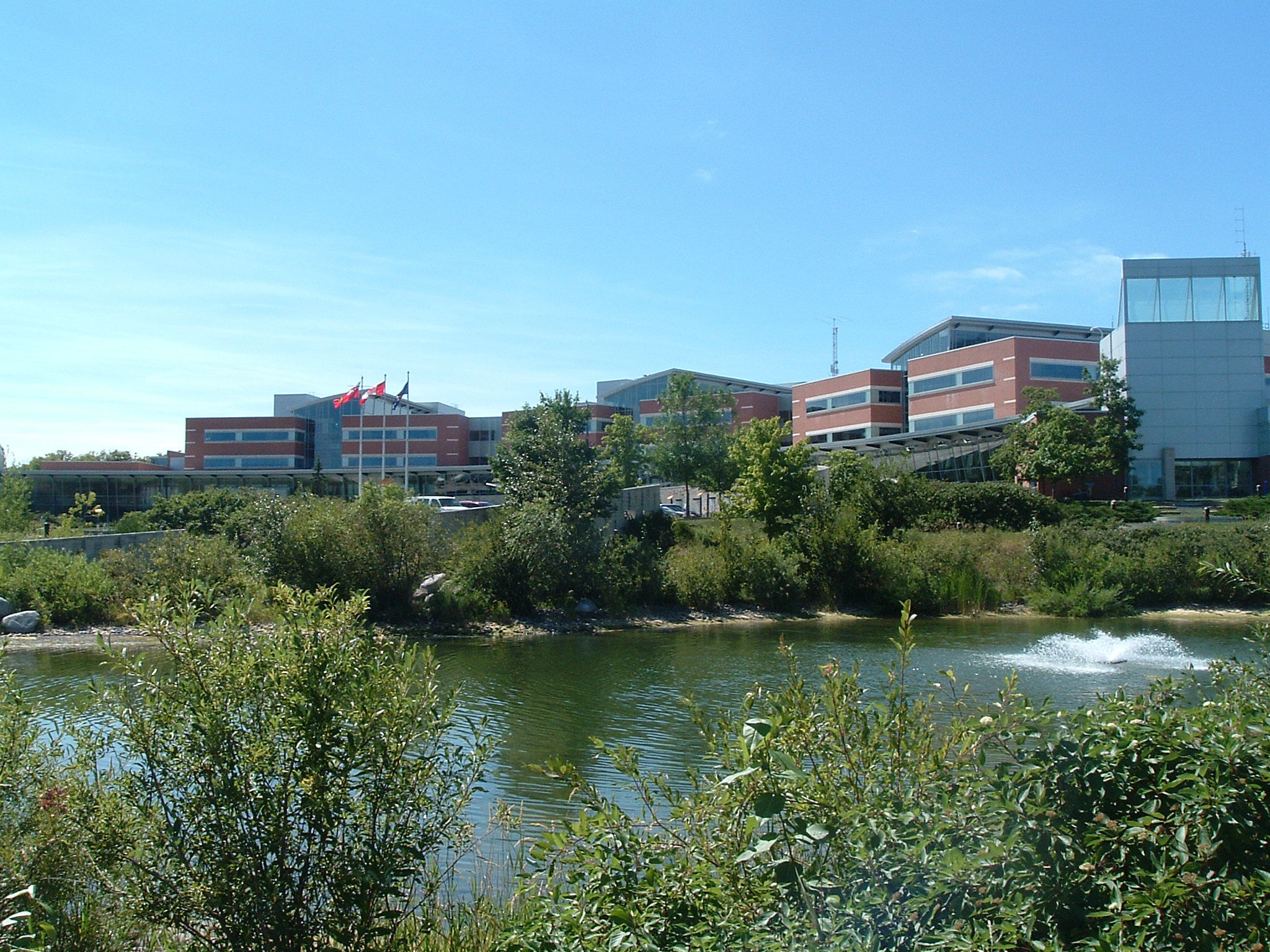
OPP headquarters

As part of an initiative to decentralise its services, the provincial government relocated the headquarters of the Ontario Provincial Police to Orillia. The office was initially located in the Tudhope Building downtown (part of which is currently used as the Orillia City Hall) until the new building was opened in 1995. The headquarters, known as the Lincoln M. Alexander Building, is located on Memorial Avenue near the Huronia Regional Centre. The building houses the assorted bureaus and divisions that make up the general headquarters, as well as the Provincial Police Academy, and The OPP Museum.

OPP Central Region Headquarters is located on Hurtubise Road, near the intersection of Hwy 12 and Memorial Avenue.

The OPP also provides municipal policing to the City of Orillia under contract from a detachment located on University Avenue. The city's police force was disbanded when the policing contract began in 1996.

== Media ==
=== Radio ===
- FM 105.9 – CICX-FM "Pure Country 106", country music
- FM 89.1 – CISO-FM "MAX FM", Alternative and Rock music
- FM 98.5 – CIOA-FM – tourist information station

There are also rebroadcast transmitters for CBC Radio:

- FM 90.7 – CBL-FM-3 (CBC Radio 2, repeating CBL-FM Toronto)
- FM 91.5 – CBCO-FM (CBC Radio One, repeating CBLA-FM Toronto)

=== TV ===
Television stations and rebroadcasters based in the vicinity of Orillia are:

OTA virtual channel (PSIP)	OTA channel	Rogers Cable	Call Sign	Network	Notes
3.1	10 (VHF)	5	CKVR-DT	CTV 2	Transmitted from Barrie
7.1	7 (VHF)	13	CIII-DT-7	Global	Transmitted from Midland; rebroadcaster of CIII-DT-41 (Toronto)
–	21 (UHF)	8	CFTO-TV-21	CTV	Rebroadcaster of CFTO-DT (Toronto)

The incumbent cable television provider in Orillia is Rogers Cable.

== Notable people ==
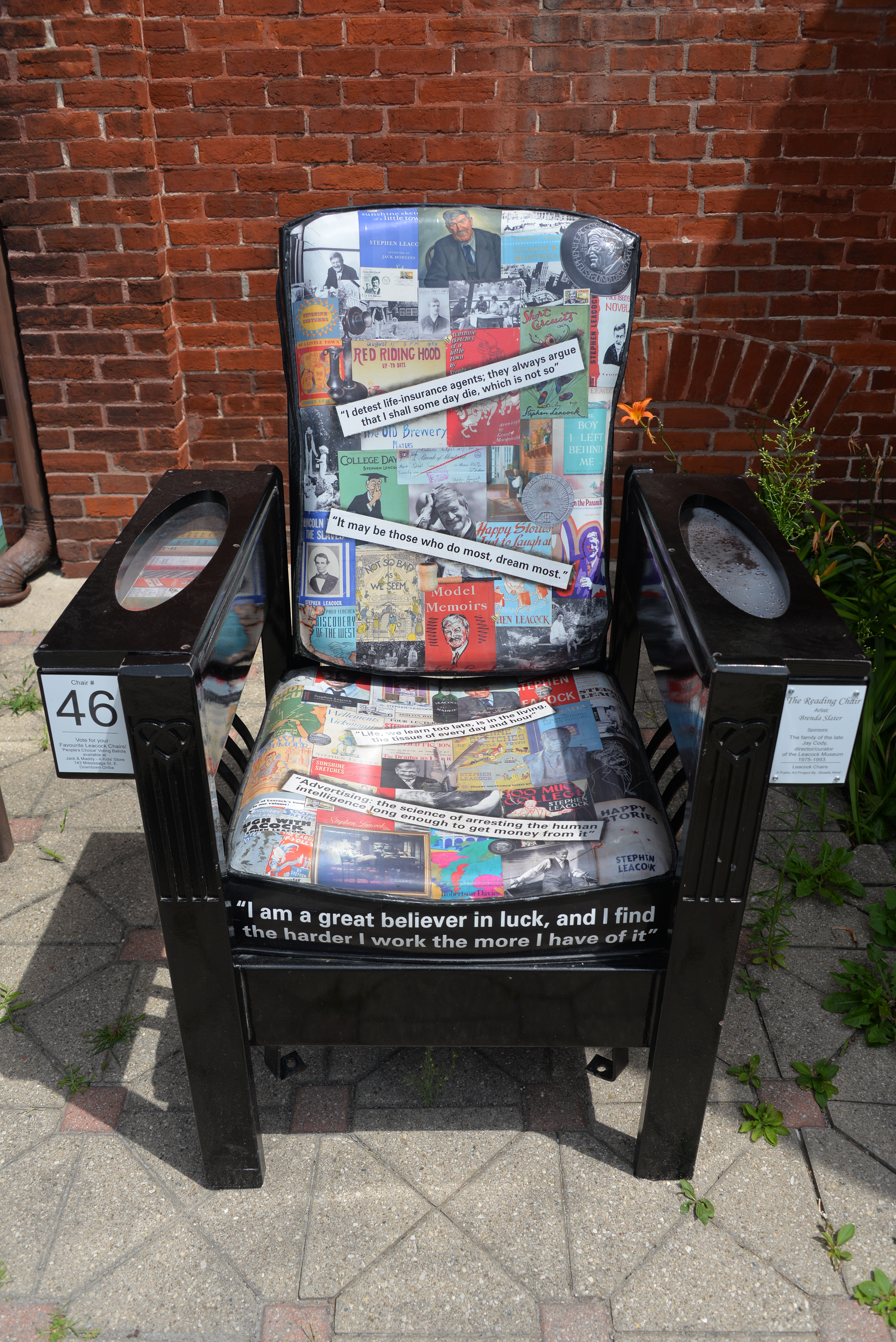
Decorative chair by Brenda Slater, dedicated to Stephen Leacock in Orillia

- A. Charles Baillie, chancellor of Queen's University
- James Bartleman, diplomat and lieutenant governor of Ontario
- William E. Bell, author
- David G. Benner, psychologist and author
- Franklin Carmichael, one of the Group of Seven
- John French, retired hockey centre
- Leslie Frost, premier of Ontario
- Jake Gaudaur, football player
- Jake Gaudaur Sr., champion oarsman
- Walter Knox, athlete and athletics coach
- John Lawless, hockey player inducted to the British Ice Hockey Hall of Fame
- Stephen Leacock, humourist
- Matt Lennox, novelist
- Doug Lewis, politician and lawyer
- Rick Ley, hockey player
- Gordon Lightfoot, singer and songwriter
- Robert W. Mackenzie, politician
- Sam Medysky, kiteboarder
- Ethan Moreau, Columbus Blue Jackets hockey player
- Jack Reid, artist, watercolours
- John Sissons, politician and judge
- Sam Steele, soldier and member of the Royal Canadian Mounted Police
- Don Tapscott, Member of the Order of Canada and former Chancellor of Trent University
- Earl Valiquette, football player
- Luke Wiles, lacrosse player
- Elizabeth Wyn Wood, sculptor
- Marnie Woodrow, novelist
