= Webers =

Canadian fast food restaurant in Ontario

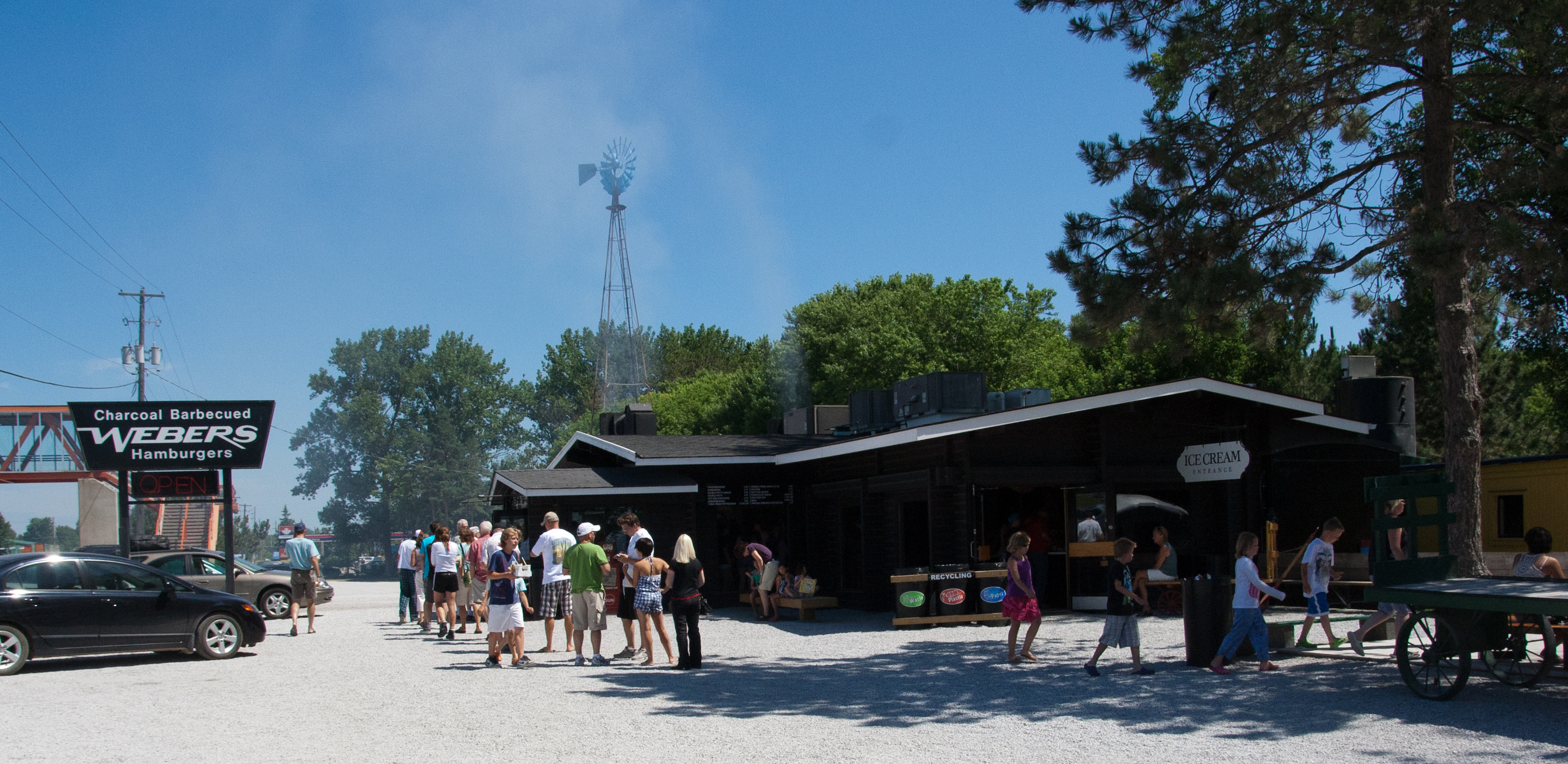
- Webers on Highway 11
- Interactive map of Webers

Restaurant information
- Established: July 11, 1963; 63 years ago
- Owner: Tom Rennie
- Location: 8844 11 Hwy S, 15 Kilometres north of Orillia, Ontario, L3V 6H3, Canada
- Coordinates: 44.6940°N 79.39884°W
- Website: www.webers.com

Webers (also known as Webers Hamburgers) is a hamburger restaurant on Ontario Highway 11, located 15 kilometres north of Orillia, Ontario that opened in July 1963. Webers grills their burgers over charcoal, with a grill man said to be able to flip up to 800 patties an hour. Long line ups are a common sight at the restaurant, which made the restaurant build a footbridge over the highway to provide access for guests from the southbound side. The restaurant's hamburger patties are also sold at Loblaws outlets.

As of 2009, Webers is reported to sell approximately 8,000 hamburgers on a typically busy Friday. The restaurant is open weekends from Thanksgiving until Christmas, but closed from January to March break.

== History ==
Webers was opened on July 11, 1963, by Paul Weber Sr., to cater to cottage goers. By the 1970s, it became so popular that patrons on the opposite side of the highway would often risk injury running across the street to the restaurant. In 1981, the province built a traffic barrier along the median of the highway in an effort to stop the jaywalking. Even so, travellers heading toward Toronto climbed over the waist-high wall to get their food. The following year, the province took further precaution by erecting a fence on top of the barrier. In 1983, Paul Weber Jr., the founder's son, bought a footbridge from CN Real Estate & Development that was being used as part of the CN Tower's SkyWalk that connected it to Front Street. It was then installed over highway 11 to provide safe access to southbound travelers. This bridge has the distinction of being the first and only privately owned bridge spanning a public highway in Ontario. In 1987, Webers installed three CN train cars, retrofitted to house their own meat processing facility. They have since added five train cars, one of which is used as an eatery. The founder's sons eventually took over the business before their father's death in 1994. Webers opened up additional restaurants in Barrie in the late 1980s; one in Orillia, off the highway, in 1995; and two outlets in Toronto Pearson International Airport in the late 1990s. These restaurants have since closed, leaving only the original location on Highway 11. In 2005, Webers began selling frozen hamburgers through Loblaws.

Paul Weber Jr. sold the company in 2004 to Guelph businessman Tom Rennie, to spend more time with his family. This gave Rennie rights to the Webers name, and control of the Highway 11 flagship location as well as the outlets at Pearson. John Weber, the founder's other son, retained control of the locations in Orillia and Barrie. Since the additional restaurants closed their doors, Rennie became the sole owner of Webers.

On July 19, 2018, Canadian prime minister Justin Trudeau visited Webers after visiting the Tim Horton Memorial Camp.

During the COVID-19 pandemic, Webers remained open with social distancing measures. Webers also started accepting debit cards for the first time in its history, having previously been a cash-only establishment.
