= Mnjikaning Fish Weirs =

Oldest known human constructions in Canada

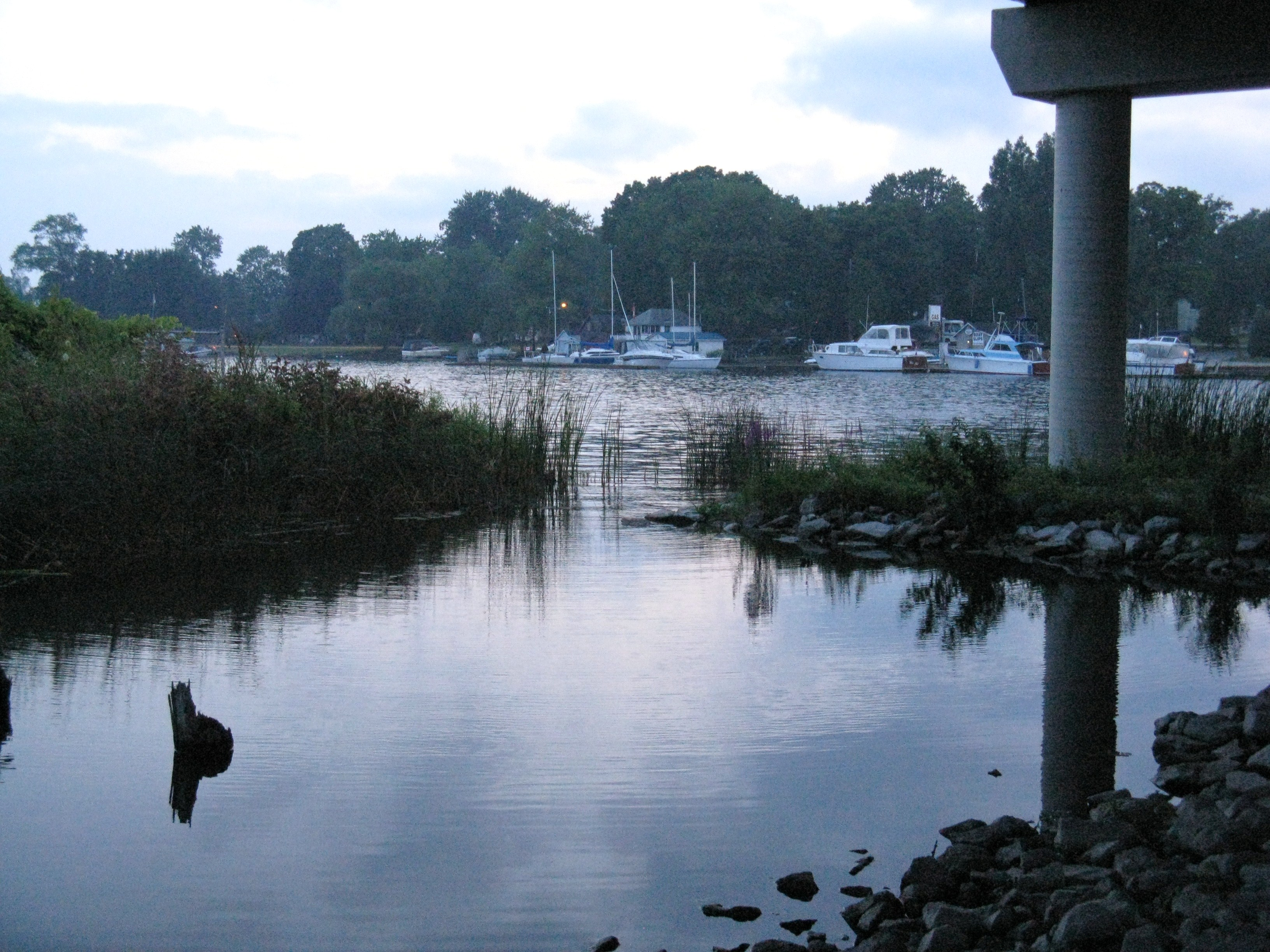
- Interactive map of Mnjikaning Fish Weirs
- 44°36′15″N 79°22′11″W
- Nearest city: Orillia, Ontario

History
- Original use: Harvesting fish

National Historic Site of Canada
- Official name: Mnjikaning Fish Weirs National Historic Site of Canada
- Designated: 12 June 1982

The Mnjikaning Fish Weirs are one of the oldest human developments in Canada. These fishing weirs were built by Indigenous people well before recorded history, dating to around 4500 BP during the Archaic period in North America, according to carbon dating done on some of the wooden remnants. The weirs were built in the narrows between Lake Couchiching and Lake Simcoe, now known as Atherley Narrows, over which Ontario Highway 12 passes today. They were preserved by the water and layers of protective silt.

The weirs were built as fences using local wood species, including eastern white cedar, sugar maple, and white birch for the stakes. The weirs were used to trap the various fish species swimming through them. The early fishermen wove brush and vegetation among the weirs to make net-like fencing where the fish were guided to be speared, netted or kept for later use, particularly for consumption during the winter.

The weirs – historically called ouentaronk (Huron) and tkaronto (Mohawk) – are believed to have provided the City of Toronto with its name, following a series of "transfers" of the name first to the transportation route leading from Lake Ontario to the weirs, then to the fort at the Lake Ontario end of that route, and then to the civilian settlement that arose near the fort. They were in use for about 5,000 years, until about the early 1700s. Samuel de Champlain recorded their existence on September 1, 1615, when he passed the weirs with the Huron en route to the battle with the Iroquois on the south east side of Lake Ontario.

The Mnjikaning Fish Weirs was officially recognized as a National Historic Site of Canada on 12 June 1982. It is managed by the Rama First Nation, who created the Mnjikaning Fish Fence Circle to protect and promote the site.

== See also ==
- List of National Historic Sites of Canada in Ontario
