= Glenna Matoush =

Ojibwe visual artist

- Born: 1946 September 1 Rama Reserve
- Died: 2025 June 25; Montreal
- Education: Quetico Park Centre, Quetico, Ontario, 1964; School of Fine Arts, Elliot Lake, Quebec, 1965; Museum of Fine Arts and Design, Montreal, Quebec, 1966-68; University of Alberta, Edmonton, Alberta; Guilde graphique de Montreal, Montreal, Quebec, 1976-80

Glenna Matoush (born 1946) is a visual artist from Canada. Many of her early works were depictions of daily activities of members from the Cree community of Lake Mistassini, where she lived. Her more recent work addresses the social and political realities of Aboriginal people, including environmental issues, the impact of AIDs, and the recovery of indigenous languages and cultures.

== Early life and education ==
Matoush was born in 1946 in on the Rama Reserve, Ontario, Canada. She was the ninth of thirteen children. Her tribal affiliation is Ojibway. She moved to the Cree community of Lake Mistassini in 1971 and began raising a family. In 1992 she moved to Montreal, Quebec.

Her education includes Quetico Park Centre, Quetico, Ontario, 1964; School of Fine Arts, Elliot Lake, Quebec, 1965; Museum of Fine Arts and Design, Montreal, Quebec, 1966–68; University of Alberta, Edmonton, Alberta; Guilde graphique de Montreal, Montreal, Quebec, 1976-80.

== Artistic career ==
Matoush began her artistic career as a printmaker. She turned to painting, collage, and mixed media starting in the 1990s. Matoush's work has been compared to that of Jackson Pollock. She uses bright colors in works that are abstract, but based on careful design. Thematically, she addresses memory, spirituality, and the power of the land through a Cree and Anishnaabe lens. Much of her work has a social commentary component, such as her series Shaman Transporting Souls to the Heavens, in which she rebuts the idea that the petroglyphs in Ontario's Petroglyphs Provincial Park were made by vikings and not First Nations people. In Not an Act of God, her subject is the devastating drowning of twelve thousand caribou caused by a dam opening. The work's title references the statement of former Quebec premier Robert Bourassa, who called the incident an "act of God."

== Exhibitions ==
Selected Individual Exhibitions

- Salle Augustin Chenier, Ville-Marie, Quebec Centre Socio-Culturel d'Amos, Quebec (1988)
- Centre d'Art Rotary, La Sarre, Quebec (1989)
- Benvenuti, Art Galery Moderna Venice, Italy Amerindian Museum, Pointe Bleue, Quebec (1990)
- Matoush Retrospective, Côte-des-Neiges-Cultural Centre, Quebec (1995)
- Requicken, Carlton University Art Gallery (2006)

Selected Group Exhibitions

- Department of Indian Affairs, National Arts Centre, Ottawa, Ontario, Musee minier de Malartic, Malartic, Quebec, Celebration of Survival (1982)
- Art Gallery of Sudbury and Laurentian University, Sudbury, Ontario, Witness: A Symposium on the Woodland School of Painters (2007)
- National Arts Centre, Ontario, Canada, Representations of Time and Place Part 2: 1990-2014 (2015)

== Works ==
Some of her works are:

- Girl Paddling
- Not an Act of God
- My Great Grandfather, Chief Yellowhead who lies buried under McDonald's on Young Street in Toronto
- Evadney Lacing Snowshoes (1980)
- Dam Disharmony, 1991
- Shaman Transporting Souls to the Heavens (series)
- A River Disappeared, and That's a Fact (2006)
