= Elisha Beman =

Canadian businessman

Elisha Beman (c. 1760 – 14 October 1821) was a businessman involved in settlement and the trade derived from that endeavour. He was also a JP and held political offices.

Beman was born in the then Province of New York in 1760 and arrived at York, Upper Canada in 1795.

Beman was a signer, as a Provincial Commissioner, of the treaty that created the Lake Simcoe-Lake Huron Purchase. He also was one of the original settlers and businessmen in Newmarket, Ontario.

He was married to Esther Sayre, widow of Christopher Robinson in 1802 and moved to Newmarket. Beman was stepfather to Sir John Robinson and William Benjamin Robinson. He died in Newmarket in 1821.
