= Yellow Head of Lake Simcoe =

Native American Chief

Yellow Head, "Chief of Lake Simcoe", was the "head chief" of the Chippewas of Lakes Huron and Simcoe from sometime before 1797 until 1817. Evidently he was already exercising that office when, in the late summer of 1797, he led a contingent of some 140 of his Ojibwe to York and Niagara, the administrative centres of Upper Canada, seeking redress of grievances concerning absence of government contact and non-receipt of customary "annual Presents". Yellow Head was instrumental in persuading the Ojibwe of the Home District of Upper Canada to take up arms in support of the British during the War of 1812, and personally saw action at the Battle of York in April 1813, where he sustained wounds that appear to have curtailed his subsequent career. His son Musquakie, similarly known as Yellow Head, and (after his conversion to Methodism) as William Yellowhead, seems to have assumed Yellow Head's chiefly duties by 1815, and in 1817 he formally replaced his father as head chief. The date and circumstances of Yellow Head's death are not known.
