= Sam Medysky =

Canadian kitesurfer

Personal information
- Full name: Sam Medysky
- Nationality: Canadian
- Born: June 5, 1990 (age 36)

Sport
- Country: Canada
- Sport: Kitesurfing
- Team: Best Kiteboarding

Sam Medysky (born June 5, 1990) is a professional kiteboarder from Ontario, Canada.

== Life ==
Medysky started kiting when he was 9 years old. In 2004, he won the junior division at the 2004 Velocity Games. Since then he has become a 6-time Canadian National Champion and, since May 2009, a Best Kiteboarding International Team Rider.

After spending the 2009 winter training in Brazil, he made an impact in professional kiteboarding after winning a wild card entry to the 2009 Real Triple-S Invitational, a competition featuring the top professional kiteboarders held each year in Cape Hatteras, North Carolina.

For 2010 Medysky was invited back to the Triple-S Invitationa. To date he is one of only two Canadian riders to have been invited to this competition.

Medysky currently resides in Squamish, British Columbia, Canada. He is sponsored by Airrush Kiteboarding, Dakine, LiP Sunglasses and KiteRider Canada.
