= Tim Horton Memorial Camp =

Campsite in McDougall, Ontario, Canada

Coordinates: 45.5294°N 80.0016°W

- Interactive map of Tim Horton Memorial Camp
- Location: McDougall, Ontario
- Operated by: Tim Hortons
- Established: 1975

Tim Horton Memorial Camp (also known as Tim Hortons Memorial Camp and Tim Horton's Memorial Camp) is a campsite operated by Canadian fast food chain Tim Hortons located in McDougall, Ontario, on Lorimer Lake Road. The camp was founded in 1975 and was Tim Hortons' first camp.

In July 2018, Canadian Prime Minister Justin Trudeau visited Tim Horton Memorial Camp. In 2020, Tim Horton began offering online camp due to COVID-19 pandemic restrictions.

On March 3, 2021, at around 7:30 am, the McDougall Fire Department responded to a call that the "Jill building" dormitory in Tim Horton Memorial Camp had exploded. The explosion resulted in a fire, which destroyed the building. At around 4 pm, the fire was extinguished. Zero people were in the building at the time of the explosion and none of the maintenance staff on the campsite nor anyone else was injured. The Ontario Fire Marshal's office was called in to investigate the incident.
