= Severn, Ontario =

Severn
- Township (lower-tier)
- Township of Severn
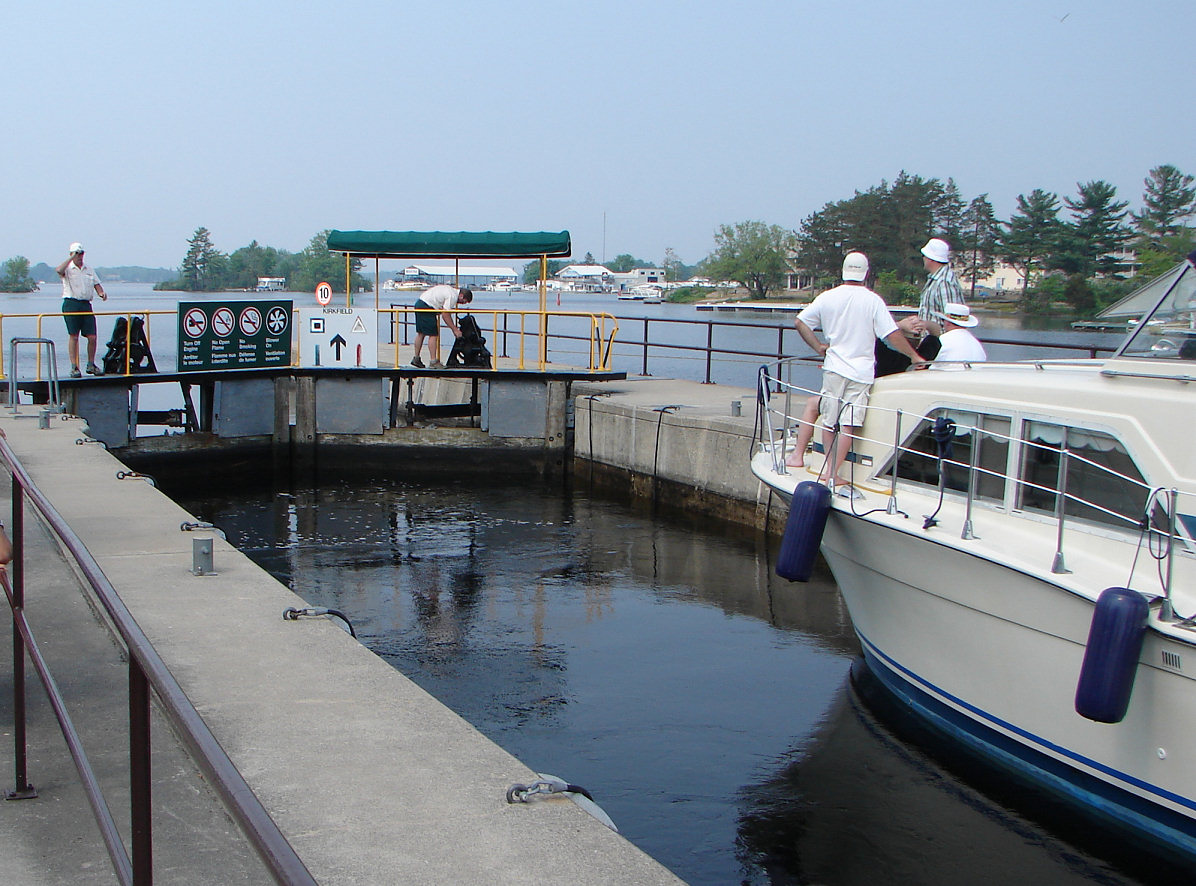
- The Trent-Severn Waterway in Port Severn

- Location within Simcoe County Location within Southern Ontario
- Coordinates: 44°45′N 79°31′W
- Country: Canada
- Province: Ontario
- County: Simcoe
- Incorporated: January 1, 1994

Government
  - Mayor: Mike Burkett
  - MPs: Bruce Stanton
  - MPPs: Jill Dunlop

Area
  - Land: 523.06 km^{2} (201.95 sq mi)
- Elevation: 69 m (226 ft)

Population (2021)
  - Total: 14,576
  - Density: 27.9/km^{2} (72/sq mi)
- Time zone: UTC-5 (Eastern (EST))
  - Summer (DST): UTC-4 (EDT)
- Postal code FSA: L0K
- Area codes: 705, 249
- Website: www.severn.ca

Severn is a township in south-central Ontario, Canada, located between Lake Couchiching, and the Severn River (both are part of the Trent–Severn Waterway) in Simcoe County.

== Communities ==
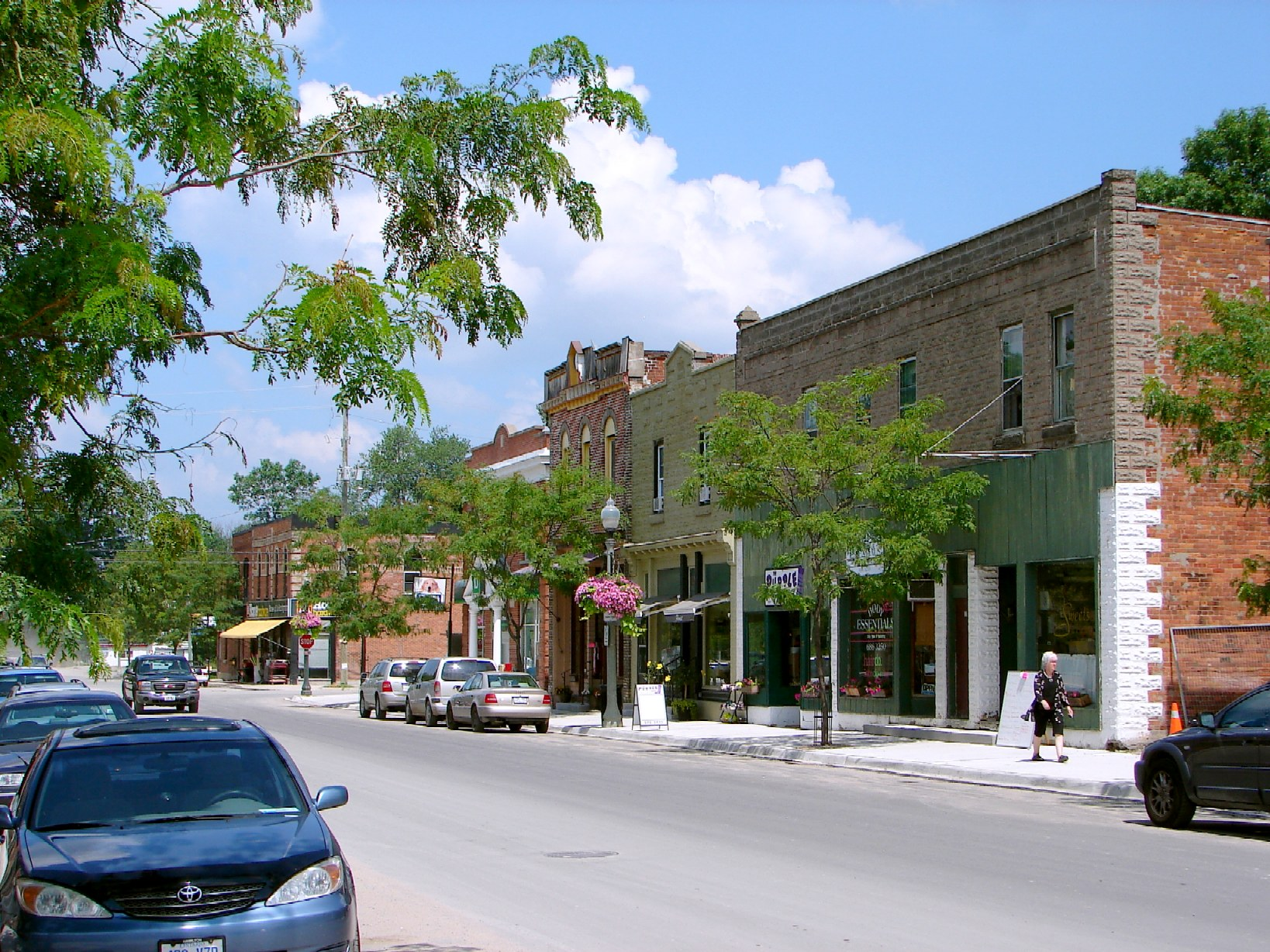
Coldwater

The township comprises the communities of:

- Amigo Beach
- Ardtrea
- Buckskin
- Buena Vista Park
- Burnside
- Carlyon
- Coldwater
- Cumberland Beach
- Fesserton
- Hamlet
- Hampshire Mills
- Happyland
- Hawkins Corner
- Hydro Glen
- Lovering
- Maple Valley
- Marchmont
- Menoke Beach
- Mordolphin
- Mount Stephen
- New Uhthoff
- Port Severn
- Port Stanton
- Scarlet Park
- Severn Bridge
- Severn Falls
- Sparrow Lake
- Swift Rapids
- Wilson Point
- Washago

== History ==
Chief John Aisance and his band of Chippewas (also known as Ojibwa) settled along the Coldwater River in 1830, calling the place Gissinausebing, which means "cold water." They built a grist mill on the site in 1833, which the Native people owned until 1849. In 1835 a post office was established, and the community was called Coldwater.

Coldwater was opened to European settlement in 1836, and was incorporated as a village in 1908. Three weekly newspapers have been published in the community: the Coldwater Planet (1896 to 1928), the Coldwater News (1895 to 1956); and the Coldwater Canadian in 1956.

At the mouth of the Severn River, another community sprang up. The residents called it Severn Mills after a sawmill was built there around 1850. Lumber from this area was sent out on ships. The village was renamed to Port Severn in 1868. In 1875, the Georgian Bay Lumber Co. was formed, soon to become the major lumber producer in the Severn River watershed.

The settlement expanded rapidly over the next 20 years. In 1896, the mill was struck by lightning and burned to the ground. Since the timber supply in the area had been greatly reduced, the mill was not rebuilt and the population of the village began to decline. With the completion of the Trent–Severn Waterway in this area in 1915, economic activity shifted from lumber to tourism.

The current township of Severn was founded on January 1, 1994, as part of the restructuring of Simcoe County, by amalgamating the village of Coldwater with the townships of Matchedash and Orillia, plus portions of the townships of Medonte and Tay.

== Demographics ==
In the 2021 Census of Population conducted by Statistics Canada, Severn had a population of 14,576 living in 5,804 of its 7,073 total private dwellings, a change of 8.3% from its 2016 population of 13,462. With a land area of 523.06 km^{2} (201.95 sq mi), it had a population density of 27.9/km^{2} (72.2/sq mi) in 2021.

Canada census – Severn, Ontario community profile

	2021	2016	2011
Population	14,576 (+8.3% from 2016)	13,477 (+8.9% from 2011)	12,377 (+2.9% from 2006)
Land area	523.06 km^{2} (201.95 sq mi)	549.75 km^{2} (212.26 sq mi)	549.90 km^{2} (212.32 sq mi)
Population density	27.9/km^{2} (72/sq mi)	24.5/km^{2} (63/sq mi)	22.5/km^{2} (58/sq mi)
Median age	49.6 (M: 48.4, F: 50.0)	49.1 (M: 48.8, F: 49.3)
Private dwellings	7,073 (total) 5,804 (occupied)	6,927 (total)	6,643 (total)
Median household income	$94,000	$77,009

References: 2021 2016 2011

Historical census populations – Severn, Ontario
Year	Pop.	±%
1996	10,257	—
2001	11,135	+8.6%
2006	12,030	+8.0%
2011	12,377	+2.9%
2016	13,462	+8.8%
2021	14,576	+8.3%
2016 Population figure based on revised count. Source: Statistics Canada

== Notable people ==
- Cody Caetano, writer, spent part of his childhood in Happyland
- Glenn Howard - curler, four time World Champion

== In film ==
- The television series, Paradise Falls, was shot in the township between 2001 and 2008. Port Stanton, Severn Falls and various locations around Sparrow Lake were used.

== See also ==
- List of townships in Ontario
