= Mnjikaning First Nation 32 =

- Indian reserve
- Mnjikaning First Nation (Rama First Nation) Indian Reserve No. 32
- Location within Southern Ontario
- Coordinates: 44°42′N 79°18′W
- Country: Canada
- Province: Ontario
- County: Simcoe
- First Nation: Chippewas of Rama

Area
  - Land: 10.70 km^{2} (4.13 sq mi)

Population (2011)
  - Total: 870
  - Density: 81.3/km^{2} (211/sq mi)
- Website: www.mnjikaning.ca

Mnjikaning First Nation 32 is an Anishinaabe reserve in Simcoe County, Ontario. It is the main reserve of the Chippewas of Rama First Nation.
