= Lake Simcoe–Lake Huron Purchase =

Canadian Indigenous land purchase

The Lake Simcoe–Lake Huron Purchase, registered as Crown Treaty Number Sixteen, was signed November 18, 1815 between the Ojibwa and the government of Upper Canada. It purchased a large portion of the lands between Lake Simcoe and Lake Huron, including all of the territory upon which the Penetanguishene Road had recently been cut.

The Penetanguishene Road was cut from Kempenfelt Bay on Lake Simcoe to Penetanguishene Bay on Lake Huron at the end of the War of 1812 for purposes of providing a military communication route. The land that it occupied was purchased in this treaty for the sum of £4,000 sterling. The territory included a quantity of land that later became parts of the townships of Oro, Vespra, Medonte, Flos, Tay and Tiny in Simcoe County. The total area purchased was approximately 250,000 acres (1,000 km^{2}).

The signees of the treaty on the side of the British included Provincial Commissioners Elisha Beman and Henry Proctor, Captain W. M. Cochrane (commander of light infantry), Lieutenant Alexander Ferguson of the Indian Department, interpreter William Gruet and James Givins on behalf of the Crown.

The signees of the treaty on the side of the Chippeway Chiefs included Kinaybicoinini, Aisance and Misquuckkey. (Chief Misquuckkey in the treaty may be the same chief whom Muskoka was named after.)

The text of the treaty is found in the holdings at the Simcoe County Archives in Barrie, Ontario, Canada.
