= Penetanguishene Bay Purchase =

1798 treaty between Upper Canada and the Chippeway

The Penetanguishene Bay Purchase, registered as Crown Treaty Number Five, was signed May 22, 1798 between the Chippeway and the government of Upper Canada. It purchased the lands around Penetanguishene Bay on Lake Huron for a price of one hundred and one pounds in Quebec currency.

This treaty was important for the colonial government, because the land being purchased would be used as the site of the naval depot at Penetanguishene, which was an important military base on Lake Huron designed to counter a potential American invasion through that route.

The signees of the treaty on the side of the British included Provincial Commissioners William Willcocks and Alexander Burns, Major Samuel Smith, J.S. Rangers, Lieutenant Arthur Holden-Brooking of the 2nd regiment, Adjutant John McGill of the 2nd regiment, Indian Agent J. Givins, W. Johnson Chew and George Cown both of the Indian Department, and W. Claus Superintendent of Indian Affairs.

The signees of the treaty on the side of the Chippeway included Chabondashea, Aasance, Wabenenguan, Ningawson and Omassanahsqutawah.
