= Lake Couchiching =

Lake in Ontario, Canada

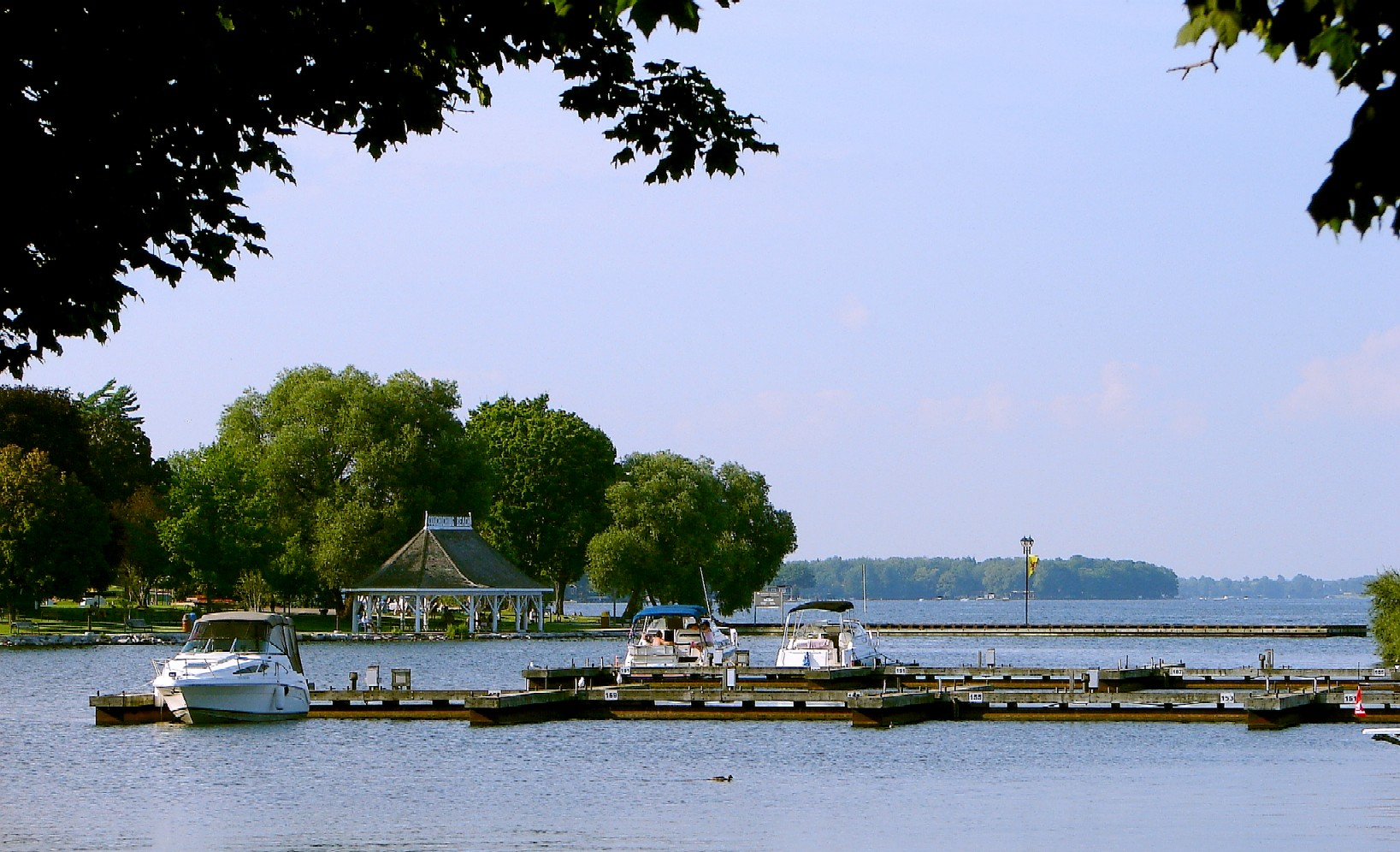
- Lake Couchiching at Orillia

- Location within Southern Ontario
- Location: Ontario, Canada
- Coordinates: 44°40′N 79°23′W
- Basin countries: Canada
- Max. length: 16 km (9.9 mi)
- Max. width: 5 km (3.1 mi)
- Surface area: 33.75 km^{2} (13.03 sq mi)
- Max. depth: 12 m (39 ft)
- Surface elevation: 219 m (719 ft)
- Islands: Chief, Horseshoe, Heron, Thistle, Bird, Nadie, Green, Portage, Ship, Shotgun, and Garnet
- Settlements: Orillia

Lake Couchiching (/ˈkuːtʃɪtʃɪŋ/ KOO-chitch-ing; from the Ojibwe gojijiing meaning "inlet") is a medium-sized lake in Central Ontario, Canada, separated from Lake Simcoe by a narrow channel.

Lakes Simcoe and Couchiching arepopular spots for fishing in summer and ice fishing in winter.

Singer-songwriter Gordon Lightfoot paid homage to the song "Couchiching".

The Couchiching Institute on Public Affairs holds its annual conference on the shores of the lake every August. Camp Couchiching is also located near the lake.

== Geography ==
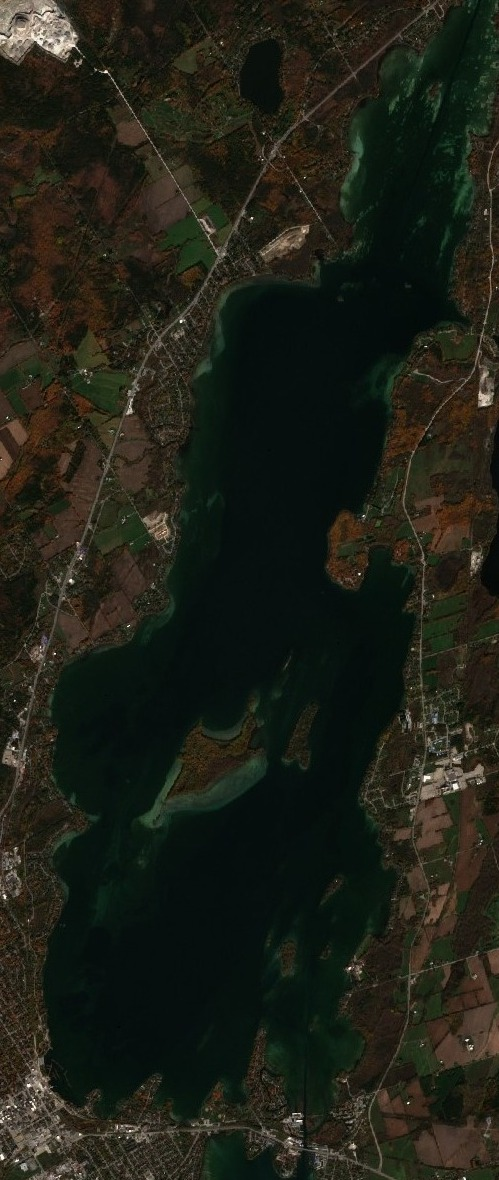
Satellite image of the lake

The Trent-Severn Waterway Enters Lake Simcoe by the Talbot River and exits this lake by the Severn River which empties into Georgian Bay.

The lake is 16 kilometres (9.9 mi) long and slightly less than 5 kilometres (3.1 mi) wide. The city of Orillia is located on the narrow channel connecting this lake with Lake Simcoe.

== Water quality ==
In a 2012 study, the lake showed a microalgae density of 2.4 × 10^7/cm^2, with a high species diversity. The lake showed low total phosphorus and high organic carbon content, when compared to Lake Simcoe.

== See also ==
- Mnjikaning Fish Weirs
