= List of islands by name (Q) =

This article features a list of islands sorted by their name beginning with the letter Q.

== Q ==
Island's Name	Island group(s)	Country/Countries
Qabre Nakhoda	Persian Gulf	Iran
Qallunaat	Upernavik Archipelago	Denmark
Qaruh	Persian Gulf	Kuwait
Qelelevu	Ringgold Isles	Fiji
Qeshm	Persian Gulf	Iran
Quadra	Discovery Islands, British Columbia	Canada
Quail	Lyttelton Harbour	New Zealand
Quarry	Severn Sound Ontario	Canada
Queneska	Vermont	United States
Query	Mikkelsen Bay, Antarctica	
Quilaluia	Quirimbas Archipelago	Mozambique
Quirimba	Quirimbas Archipelago	Mozambique
Quisiva	Quirimbas Archipelago	Mozambique
Quoin	Torres Strait Islands, Queensland	Australia

== See also ==
- List of islands (by country)
- List of islands by area
- List of islands by population
- List of islands by highest point
