= Head Lake =

Head Lake may refer to:

== Canada ==
- the community of Head Lake, Ontario
- Head Lake (Kawartha Lakes) in the Kawartha Lakes, Ontario
- Head Lake (Haliburton County) in Haliburton County, Ontario
- Head Lake (Null Lake, Thunder Bay District), a tributary of Null Lake in Thunder Bay District, Ontario
- Head Lake (Timiskaming District) in Timiskaming District, Ontario
- Head Lake (Nipissing District) in Nipissing District, Ontario
- Head Lake (Jean Township, Thunder Bay District), in Jean Township, Thunder Bay District, Ontario
- Head Lake (Renfrew County), in Renfrew County, Ontario

== United States ==
- Head Lake (Michigan)
- Head of the Lake (since 1979), annual rowing regatta held on Lake Washington
