= Severn Sound =

Bay in Ontario, Canada

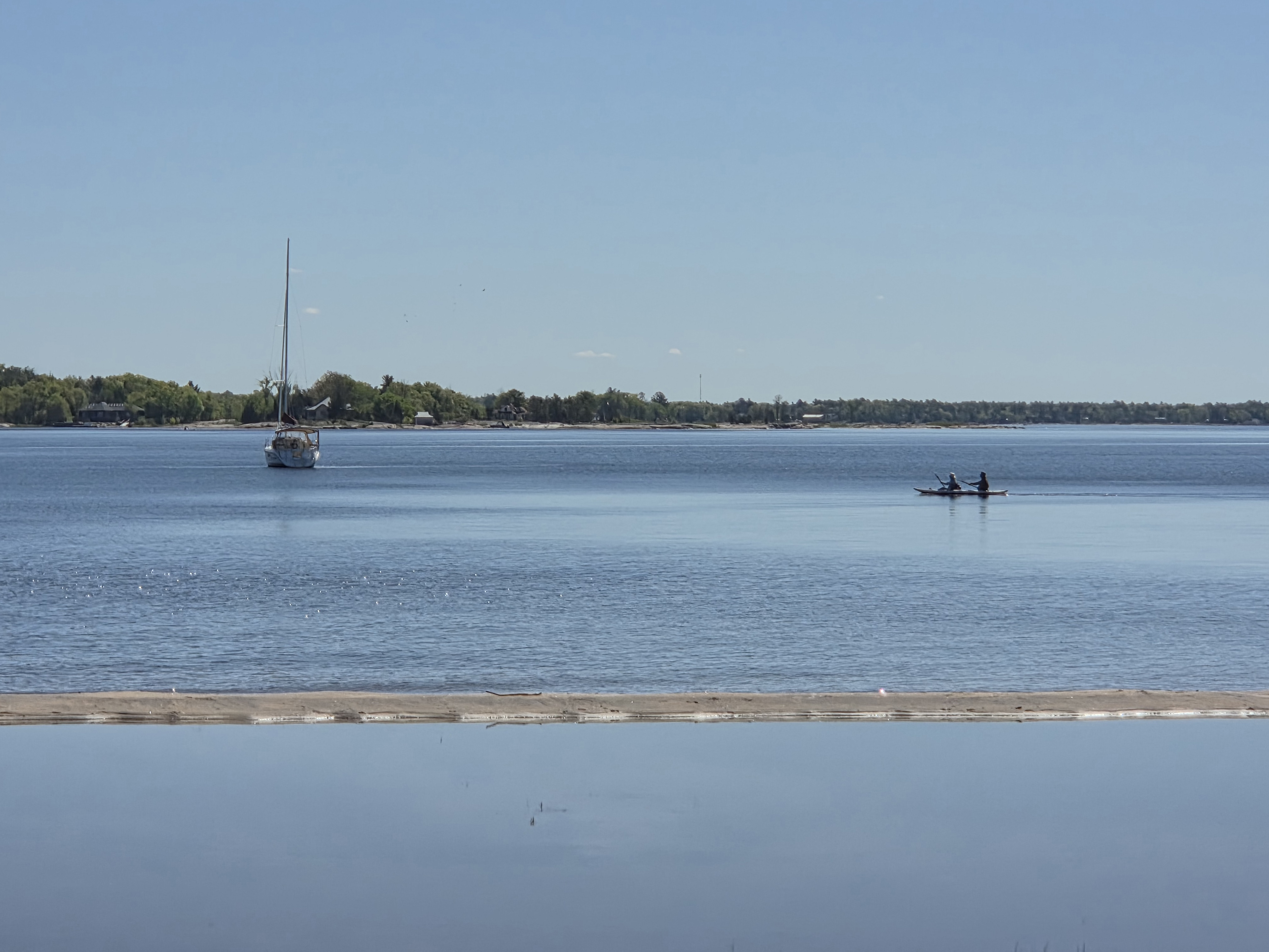
- Severn Sound viewed from the eastern shore of Beausoleil Island

- Location within Southern Ontario
- Coordinates: 44°48′N 79°49′W
- Primary inflows: Severn River, Coldwater River, Sturgeon River, Wye River
- Primary outflows: Georgian Bay
- Basin countries: Canada
- Surface area: 130 km^{2} (50 sq mi)
- Islands: Beausoleil Island, Quarry Island

Severn Sound is a sound of southeastern Georgian Bay in Ontario, Canada. Formerly affected by algal blooms beginning in the mid-1960s, it was designated a Great Lakes Area of Concern in 1987, until successful water pollution reduction and wetland restoration efforts led to its delisting in 2003.

== Geography ==
Severn Sound is a southeastern arm of Georgian Bay. It is an irregularly shaped complex of shallow bays that is mostly separated from the rest of Georgian Bay by Beausoleil Island. It extends approximately 14–18 kilometres (8.7–11.2 mi) from Beausoleil Island east to the mouth of Matchedash Bay. Its southwestern limit is variously defined as the western or eastern side of the mouth of Outer Harbour, the approach to Penetang Harbour. From west to east, the other bays on its south side are Midland Bay, Hog Bay, Sturgeon Bay, and Matchedash Bay. Severn Sound covers an area of approximately 130 square kilometres (50 sq mi). Its depth varies from less than 5 metres (16 ft) at its eastern end to 20 metres (66 ft) at the mouth of Outer Harbour.

Drainage areas of rivers other than the Severn River in the Severn Sound watershed
Sub-watershed	Drainage area (km^{2})
North River	318.74
Coldwater River	191.40
Sturgeon River	98.30
Hog River	60
Wye River	208.15
Copeland Creek	23.56

The principal river draining into Severn Sound is the Severn River. The Severn flows out of Lake Couchiching and through Sparrow Lake and Gloucester Pool, emptying into Severn Sound at Port Severn. Its course is controlled by a series of dams and locks that form part of the Trent–Severn Waterway. Its watershed covers an area of 6,094 square kilometres (2,353 sq mi) if the sub-watersheds of all its inflows, including Lake Simcoe and the Black River, are included.

The rest of the Severn Sound watershed covers about 1,000 square kilometres (390 sq mi). Besides the Severn, other rivers that flow into Severn Sound are North River, Coldwater River, Sturgeon River, Hog Creek, Wye River, and Copeland Creek.

Severn Sound lies on the boundary between two physiographic regions. The Georgian Bay Fringe on its north shore is characterized by bare Precambrian granitic rock with very thin soil. On its south shore, the Simcoe Uplands comprise rolling plains of glacial till divided by ridges of sand and gravel deposited by prehistoric Lake Algonquin. Average annual precipitation in the region is about 1,040 millimetres (41 in), which includes heavy lake-effect snow from Georgian Bay in the winter in the range of 281 to 344 centimetres (111 to 135 in).

== Name ==
The name "Severn Sound" for the extension of Georgian Bay east of Beausoleil Island is a modern coinage, having been officially adopted in 1978. Alexander Macdonell and Robert Pilkington both accompanied John Graves Simcoe on his 1793 visit to Severn Sound; the former's diary refers to Severn Sound as Matchetache Bay, while the latter's map calls it "Gloucester or Machedash Bay". David William Smith's map of the Penetanguishene Bay Purchase used Gloucester, Sturgeon, and Matchedash Bay as alternative names for the same body of water; these names also appear in his 1799 gazetteer. William Fitzwilliam Owen's map of 1815 called it Matchidash Bay, and Henry Wolsey Bayfield's survey of Georgian Bay in 1822 called it Matchedash Bay. In James Chewett's 1826 map of Upper Canada and William Gibbard's 1853 map of Simcoe County, the innermost marginal bays of Severn Sound were named Matchedash Bay and Sturgeon Bay, in accordance with present-day usage, while Gloucester Bay was used to denote what is now called Midland Bay.

== Current human activity ==
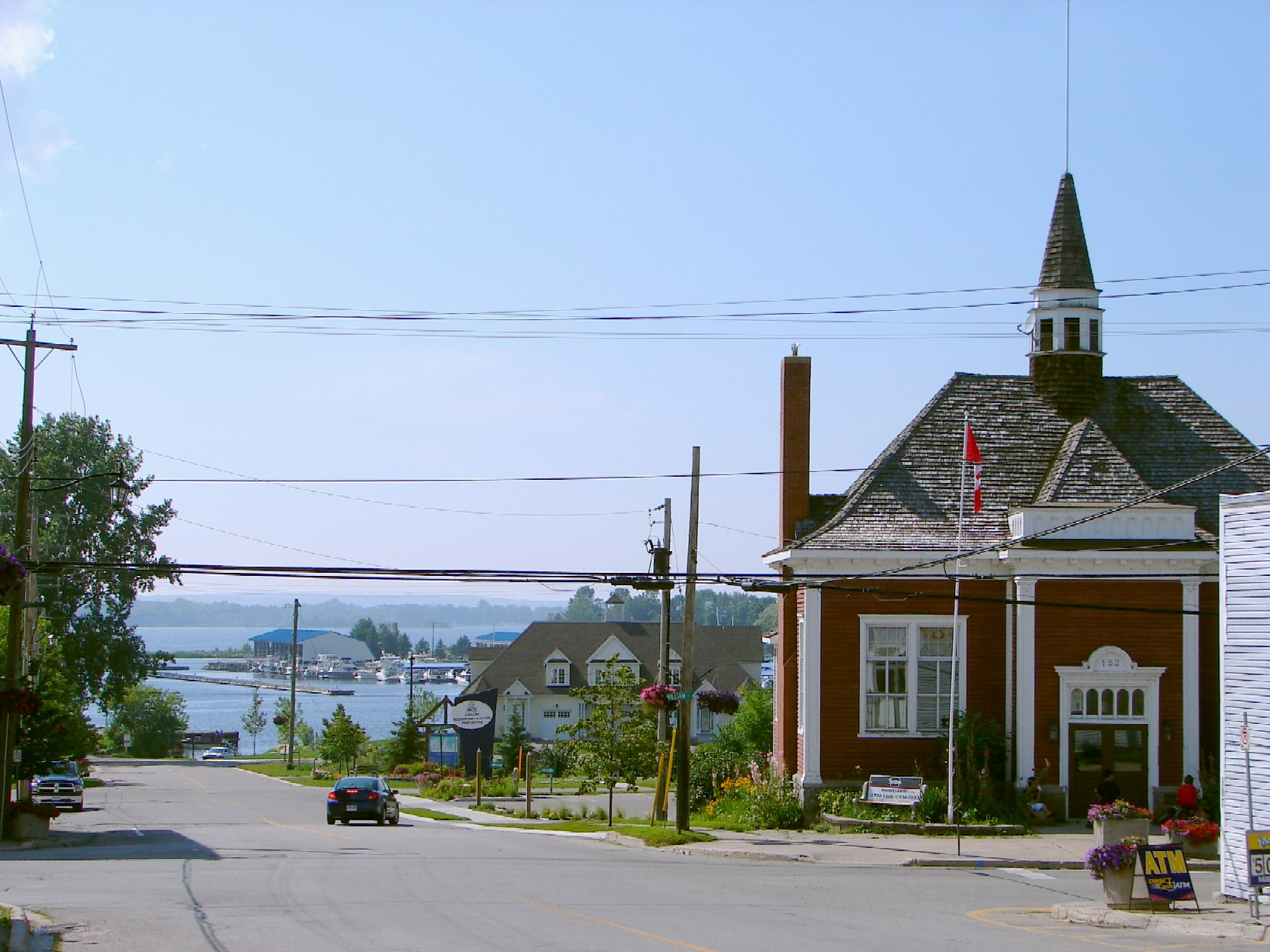
Victoria Harbour, a community on Hog Bay in the township of Tay.

The south and east sides of Severn Sound lie within Simcoe County, and specifically within the towns of Penetanguishene and Midland and the township of Tay. The Sound's north shore lies in the township of Georgian Bay in the District Municipality of Muskoka. Approximately 110,000–120,000 people live year-round in the vicinity of the Sound, although the population may double or triple in the summer with the arrival of seasonal cottagers, boaters and tourists.

The township of Tay obtains its water supply from Severn Sound, and the community of Port Severn in the township of Georgian Bay obtains its water supply from Little Lake at the mouth of the Severn River. Midland and Penetanguishene obtain their water supply from groundwater sources.

Although Severn Sound has not been commercially fished since the 1940s, sport fishing remains popular. Species fished include walleye, chinook salmon, lake trout, northern pike, smallmouth and largemouth bass, white perch, bluegill and black crappie.

Severn Sound is well known for supporting boating and other aquatic recreational activities in the summer. Private marinas are located at Penetanguishene, Midland, Port McNicoll, Victoria Harbour, Waubaushene, Port Severn and Honey Harbour.

Severn Sound marks the southern limit of the Georgian Bay Mnidoo Gamii Biosphere Reserve. Protected areas around the Sound include Georgian Bay Islands National Park, Wye Marsh National and Provincial Wildlife Areas, and Matchedash Bay Provincial Wildlife Area. Wye Marsh and Matchedash Bay are also designated Important Bird Areas, and Matchedash Bay is a Ramsar wetland.

== History ==
=== First Nations, French contact, and British settlement ===
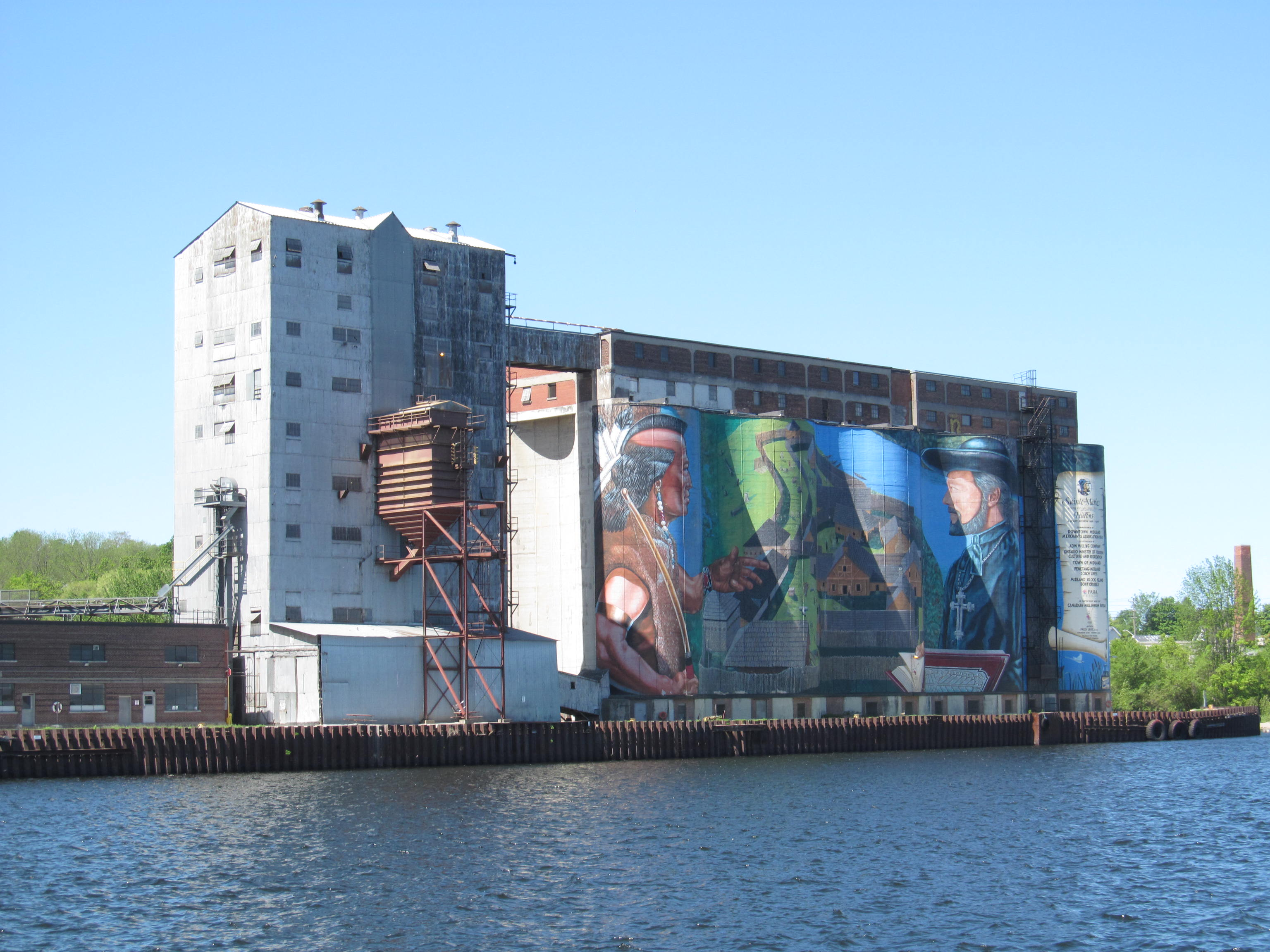
The grain elevator at Midland operated by ADM, with a mural measuring 80 feet (24 m) high and 250 feet (76 m) wide painted on its side. Entitled Huron Native and Jesuit Priest at Sainte-Marie, the mural was started by Fred Lenz in 1999 and completed after his death in 2001 by Michele van Maurik, with assistance from Scott Frandsen and Fred's sons Robert and Steven.

Humans have inhabited the Severn Sound area since at least the Archaic period. Projectile points have been found on Beausoleil Island dating back 5500 years, and pottery fragments found at the Kitchikewana site on that island shows it was regularly visited from the middle Woodland period (400 BCE – 1000 CE) onwards.

Agricultural Wendat or Huron settlers first established villages in the Simcoe Uplands on the south side of Severn Sound in the late 13th century. This area remains known today as Huronia. The Attignawantan (Bear) and Attigneenongnahac (Cord) built the first alliance between Wendat nations in the mid-15th century. The Arendahronon (Rock) and Tahontaenrat (Deer) joined the Wendat confederacy around 1590 and 1610 respectively.

The first European to visit Huronia was likely Étienne Brûlé, who from 1610 to 1615 lived among the Algonquin people as a trainee interpreter. In 1615, Samuel de Champlain visited Georgian Bay and overwintered in Huronia. With him was a Récollet missionary, Joseph Le Caron, who would live among the Wendat in 1615–1616 and 1623–1624. The Jesuit Jean de Brébeuf began a mission in Huronia in 1626. In 1639 he oversaw the building of the mission of Sainte-Marie among the Hurons, Ontario's first European settlement, at what is now the town of Midland.

Huronia reached a peak population of 30,000 to 35,000 in 1634, before successive epidemics of measles, influenza and smallpox reduced it to 10,000–12,000 by 1640. Attacks by the Haudenosaunee in 1648 and 1649 resulted in the martyrdom of Brébeuf and other French missionaries and the burning of Sainte-Marie, and ultimately forced the Wendat to abandon Huronia for good.

Following the dispersal of the Wendat, the Ojibwe migrated into the Severn Sound area. In the late 1770s, a fur trader named George Cowan (also known as Jean Baptiste Constant) built a trading post on Matchedash Bay. He was visited by John Graves Simcoe in October 1793, who saw the potential for a naval base at Penetanguishene. Land on the south side of Severn Sound was purchased from the Ojibwe through John Collins's Purchase of 1785, the Penetanguishene Bay Purchase of 1798 (in which George Cowan acted as intepreter), and the Lake Simcoe–Lake Huron Purchase of 1815. John Aisance led his band, now the Beausoleil First Nation, from their reserve on the Coldwater River to Beausoleil Island in 1842. They moved to the Christian Islands around 1858, although three families were still present on Beausoleil Island when Georgian Bay Islands National Park was established at the end of 1929.

Penetanguishene Road was built in 1815, connecting Severn Sound to Kempenfelt Bay on Lake Simcoe. The garrison at Fort Nottawasaga at present-day Wasaga Beach was moved to Penetanguishene in 1818, and settlers arrived in the Severn Sound area soon afterwards. In 1829, Jacob Gill built a lumber mill on Copeland Creek to supply the growing military base at Penetanguishene. The Royal Navy left Penetanguishene and the Great Lakes as a whole in 1834, but the British Army stayed until 1856. The base was converted to a reformatory for boys in 1859, and then a mental health facility (now the Waypoint Centre for Mental Health Care) in 1904. The remains of the military base were excavated in the 1950s and have been rebuilt and opened as a tourist attraction named Discovery Harbour.

=== Confederation to the present day ===
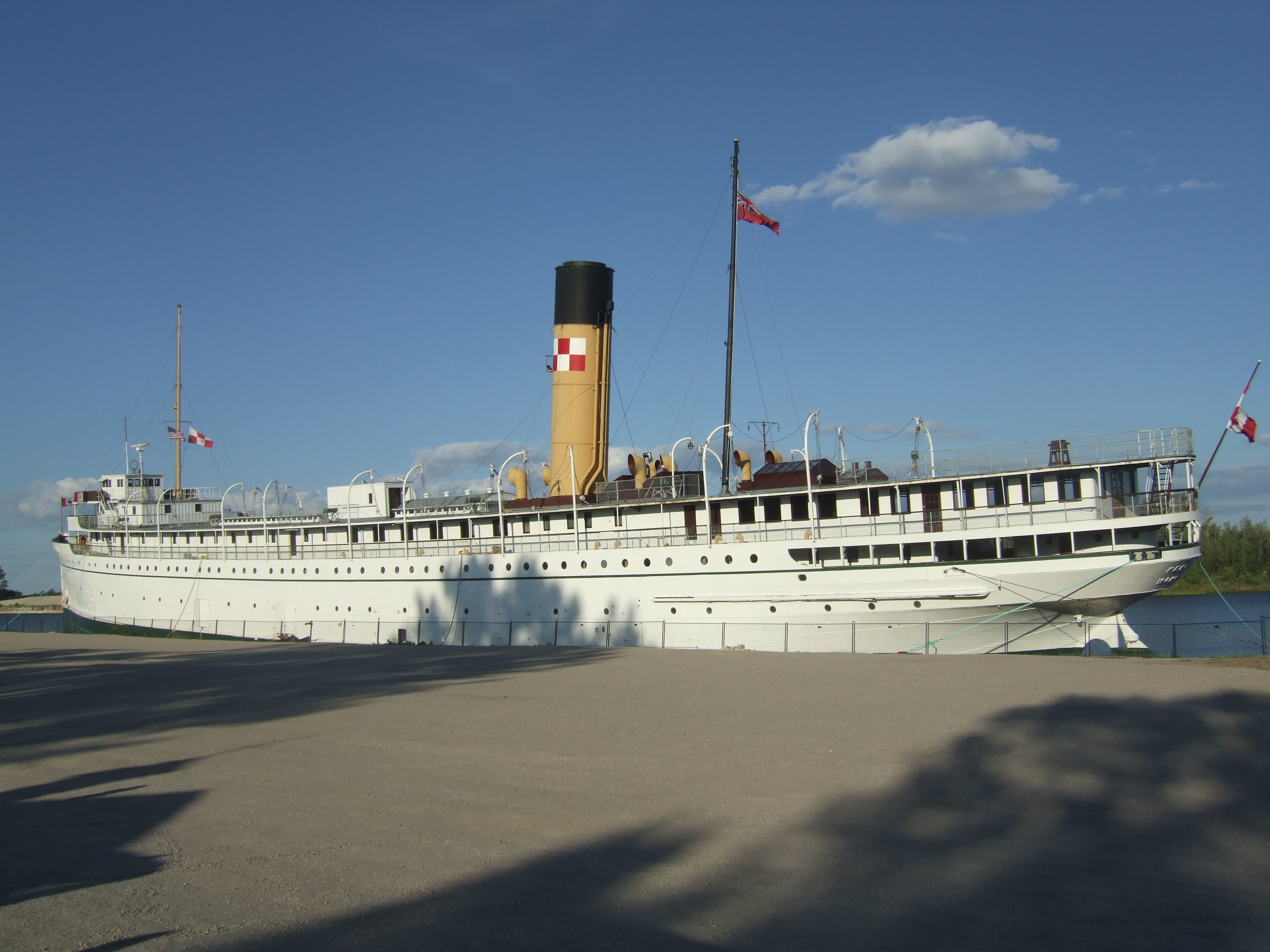
The SS Keewatin, a passenger steamship built in 1907 for the Canadian Pacific Railway, which ran the route between Port McNicoll and Port Arthur between 1912 and 1965. It was then converted to a museum ship and is seen here at Port McNicoll in 2012.

The introduction of railways into the Severn Sound area stimulated growth in the local lumber industry, and turned the Sound into an important centre for grain shipping and shipbuilding in the first half of the 20th century. The Midland Railway of Canada running from Port Hope reached Midland in 1879, and in 1881, Midland's first grain elevator opened. Midland had as many as four operational grain elevators at one point, although only one remains today, operated by ADM. Midland's shipyard operated from 1910 to 1930 and from 1940 to 1954. Canadian Pacific Railway founded Port McNicoll in 1909 to serve as the terminus for its Georgian Bay and Seaboard Railway. Port McNicoll's grain elevator was built in 1910 and operated until 1990, before being demolished in 2009.

Commercial fishing in Severn Sound began in the 1880s and was primarily based in Midland. The population of lake sturgeon had declined significantly by 1900, but commercial fishing for lake trout, lake whitefish and lake herring continued until the populations of these coldwater species also collapsed in the 1940s.

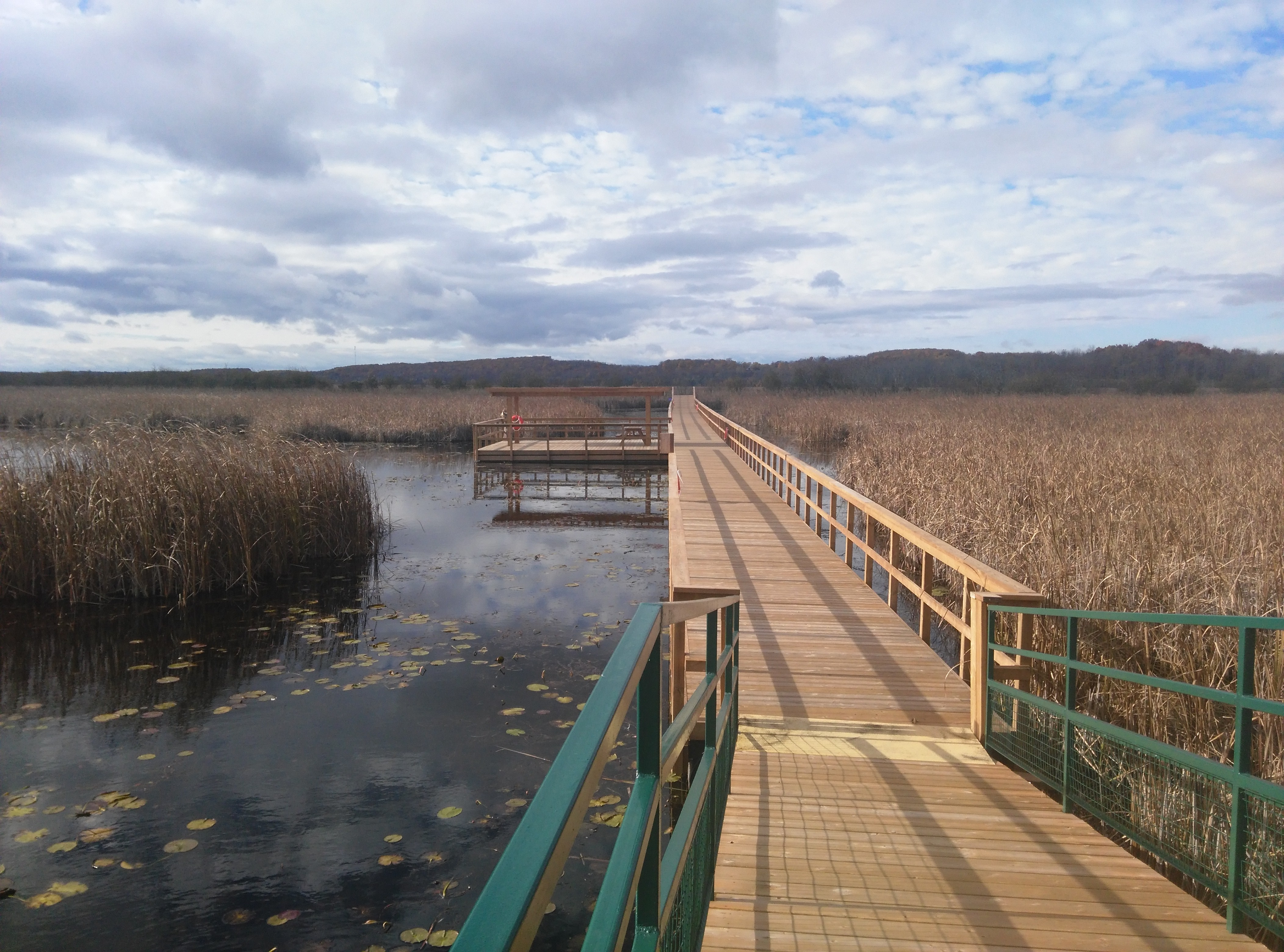
The boardwalk at Wye Marsh

Starting in the mid-1960s, eutrophication caused excessive algal growth in Severn Sound and its marginal bays, particularly in Penetang Harbour. This led to the International Joint Commission identifying it as a Great Lakes Area of Concern (AOC) in 1987. The Severn Sound Remedial Action Plan (SSRAP) was developed to address problems of eutrophication, fish population and habitat degradation, and water contamination in the Severn Sound watershed.

Significant reductions in phosphorus levels and algal growth in Severn Sound occurred in the 1990s. Implementation of the SSRAP resulted in reduction in phosphorus from runoff from farms and upgraded sewage treatment plants and septic systems, but the proliferation of invasive zebra and quagga mussels at the same time may also have contributed to the improvements in water quality of the Sound. Other achievements of the SSRAP included the rehabilitation of 411 hectares (1,020 acres) of wetlands; the planting of vegetation buffers along watercourses to reduce erosion; and the reintroduction of trumpeter swans to Wye Marsh, aided by the banning of lead shot, and the remediation of marsh sediment to keep existing lead shot pellets out of reach of the swans. Following these efforts, Severn Sound was delisted as an AOC in 2003.

The community-based Severn Sound Environmental Association was established in 1997 to support the completion of the SSRAP, and to sustain the continued environmental protection of the Sound and its immediate watershed after its delisting as an Area of Concern. As of 2026, it is a Joint Municipal Service Board supported by the municipalities of Midland, Oro-Medonte, Penetanguishene, Severn, Springwater, Tay and Tiny. It is also the Source Protection Authority for the Severn Sound area.
