= Riley Lake =

Riley Lake may refer to:

- Riley Lake (Kenora District, Ontario), Northwestern Ontario, Canada
- Riley Lake (Muskoka, Ontario), Central Ontario, Canada
- Riley Lake, Ontario, a rural community
