= Sparrow Lake =

Lake in Ontario, Canada

- Location of the lake in Southern Ontario
- Location: Ontario
- Coordinates: 44°49′07″N 79°23′46″W
- Part of: Great Lakes Basin
- Primary inflows: Severn River, Kahshe River
- Primary outflows: Severn River
- Basin countries: Canada
- Max. length: 7 km (4.3 mi)
- Max. width: 2 km (1.2 mi)
- Average depth: 4 m (13 ft)
- Max. depth: 12 m (39 ft)

Sparrow Lake is a lake in the Great Lakes Basin in Central Ontario, Canada. It is situated north-west of the town of Orillia and south of the town of Gravenhurst, Ontario and approximately 150 kilometres and a 1.5 hour drive north of the Greater Toronto Area. Sparrow Lake is the most southerly lake in the popular Muskoka tourist region.

The lake was named after a William Sparrow, an Englishman, who fished and hunted the area in the 19th century. He disappeared one summer giving rise to stories that he may have been murdered.

It is also slightly famous as being the northern setting for the Showcase TV show Paradise Falls. Various settings and lodges around the lake were used for filming. It is also home to Sparrow Lake Camp (https://sparrowlakecamp.com/) (founded 1912), the oldest children's recreational camp operated by the United Church of Canada.

There is an abundance of resorts and lodges on the lake. There are also two golf courses, Lake St. George Golf Club and Evergreen Golf Center within 3 km.

== Geography ==
This shallow, fresh body of water is a part of the Trent–Severn Waterway, a series of rivers, lakes and canals running southwest from Severn Sound on the eastern shore of Lake Huron's Georgian Bay, up the Severn River, through Lake Couchiching, Lake Simcoe and the Kawartha Lakes and down the Trent River across south-central Ontario to the northern shore of Lake Ontario.

The lake is approximately 7 kilometres in length and between 1 and 2 kilometres in width, with a maximum depth of approximately 12 metres and an average depth of approximately 4 metres. The main inflow and outflow is the Severn River, which in turn drains the Lake Simcoe, Lake Couchiching and Black River watersheds. Other inflows are the Kahshe River (Kahshe Lake/Gartersnake) and the Beaver Creek watersheds.

Situated on the southern edge of the Canadian Shield, the lake is spotted with granite islands and surrounded by rocky, well-treed shorelines. Shoreline development consists mainly of road-access recreational cottage properties with several resorts and full-service marinas accessible by road and water.

== History ==
The Sparrow Lake Historical Society was established in 1984.

== Flora and fauna ==
The lake is considered quite productive in terms of aquatic plants and fish, with nutrient values being towards the higher end of the mesotrophic range.

=== Fish ===
Principal angling gamefish inhabiting Sparrow Lake include:

- Largemouth bass
- Smallmouth bass
- Northern pike
- Walleye
- Muskellunge

Other fish species caught by anglers include yellow perch, rock bass, black crappie, pumpkinseed, bluegill, channel catfish, brown bullhead and bowfin.

=== Birds ===
Bird species inhabiting the lake and surrounding area include:

- Seagulls
- Terns
- Loons
- Cormorants
- Canada geese
- Osprey
- Great blue heron
- Turkey vultures
- Mallard ducks and other waterfowl.

Bald eagle

== In film ==
- The television series Paradise Falls was shot at various locations around the lake from 2001 to 2008. Lauderdale Marina, Stanton House and various cottages were used in the production.
- Portions of the Amazon Prime Video series Sterling Point were filmed at Sparrow Lake Camp.

== Namesakes ==
A methane lake on Titan, the largest moon of Saturn, has been named 'Sparrow Lacus', after Sparrow Lake. That lake is composed of liquid methane and ethane, is located 84°3N and 64.7°W on Titan's globe.

== See also ==
- List of lakes in Ontario
