= Sturgeon River (Simcoe County) =

- Location of the mouth of the Sturgeon River in southern Ontario

Location
- Country: Canada
- Province: Ontario
- Region: Central Ontario
- County: Simcoe
- Municipalities: Tay; Oro-Medonte; Springwater

Physical characteristics
- Source: Unnamed spring
  - location: Oro-Medonte
  - coordinates: 44°33′21″N 79°41′13″W
  - elevation: 273 m (896 ft)
- Mouth: Sturgeon Bay, Severn Sound, Georgian Bay
  - location: Tay
  - coordinates: 44°44′12″N 79°44′16″W
  - elevation: 176 m (577 ft)
- Length: 25 km (16 mi)

Basin features
- River system: Lake Huron drainage basin

The Sturgeon River is a river in the Lake Huron drainage basin in the municipalities of Tay, Oro-Medonte and Springwater in Simcoe County, Central Ontario, Canada.

== Course ==
The Sturgeon river begins at an unnamed spring between the Simcoe Highlands and the western edge of the Oro Moraine, and just west of the community of Horseshoe Valley in Oro-Medonte. It passes north through Craigs Swamp, then under Ontario Highway 400 and into Springwater southeast of the community of Hillsdale. It flows over Rumbles Dam and re-enters Oro-Medonte. The river continues north, passes under Simcoe County Road 23 into Tay, then passes under Ontario Highway 12 and through the communities of Sturgeon Bay and Sturgeon Beach to reach its mouth at Sturgeon Bay on Severn Sound, part of Georgian Bay on Lake Huron.

== See also ==
- List of rivers of Ontario

== Sources ==
- "Sturgeon River". Geographical Names Data Base. Natural Resources Canada.
- "Sturgeon River". Atlas of Canada. Natural Resources Canada. 2010-02-04. Shows river course.
