= Riley Lake (Muskoka, Ontario) =

- Location of Riley Lake in southern Ontario
- Location: Ontario, Canada
- Coordinates: 44°50′13″N 79°10′54″W
- Type: Lake
- Part of: Great Lakes Basin
- Max. length: 3.9 km (2.4 mi)
- Max. width: 2.7 km (1.7 mi)
- Surface elevation: 247 m (810 ft)
- Settlements: Riley Lake

Riley Lake is a lake in geographic Ryde Township in the town of Gravenhurst, District Municipality of Muskoka in Central Ontario, Canada. It is part of the Great Lakes Basin.

There is one named inflow, Green's Creek, at the northeast. The primary outflow is Riley Creek at the south that flows via the Black River and Severn River to Georgian Bay on Lake Huron.

The community of Riley Lake is located on the lake.

== See also ==
- List of lakes in Ontario
