= Head River =

- Location of the mouth of the Head River in southern Ontario

Location
- Country: Canada
- Province: Ontario
- Region: Southern Ontario
- Municipalities: Ramara; Kawartha Lakes

Physical characteristics
- Source: Head Lake
  - location: Kawartha Lakes
  - coordinates: 44°45′25″N 78°55′28″W
  - elevation: 268 m (879 ft)
- Mouth: Black River
  - location: Ramara
  - coordinates: 44°43′46″N 79°14′51″W
  - elevation: 222 m (728 ft)

Basin features
- River system: Great Lakes Basin

The Head River is a river in the township of Ramara, Simcoe County and the city of Kawartha Lakes in Southern Ontario, Canada. It is in the Great Lakes Basin, and flows from Head Lake west to the Black River, east of Lake Couchiching. The Black River flows via the Severn River to Georgian Bay on Lake Huron.

== See also ==
- List of rivers of Ontario
