= Head Lake (Kawartha Lakes) =

Lake in southern Ontario, Canada

- Location of the lake in Southern Ontario
- Location: Kawartha Lakes, Ontario, Ontario
- Coordinates: 44°44′25″N 78°54′46″W
- Primary inflows: Head River
- Primary outflows: Head River
- Basin countries: Canada
- Max. length: 5 mi (8.0 km)
- Max. width: 3 mi (4.8 km)
- Surface area: 938.28 hectares (2,318.5 acres)
- Max. depth: 30 feet (9 m)
- Surface elevation: 879 feet (268 m)
- Settlements: Head Lake

Head Lake is a lake in the city of Kawartha Lakes, in the Canadian province of Ontario. It is located between Uphill to the west and Norland to the east. Kawartha Lakes Road 45 (formerly Highway 503) follows the southern and western shoreline of the lake. The community of Head Lake is located on the southern shore of the lake.

The lake is in the Great Lakes Basin and is about 5 km (3.1 mi) wide and 8 km (5.0 mi) long. The primary inflow, at the northeast, and outflow, at the northwest, is the Head River. The Head River flows via the Black River and the Severn River to Georgian Bay on Lake Huron.

== See also ==
- List of lakes in Ontario
