= Tauraria =

Atoll in the Ringgold Isles, Fiji

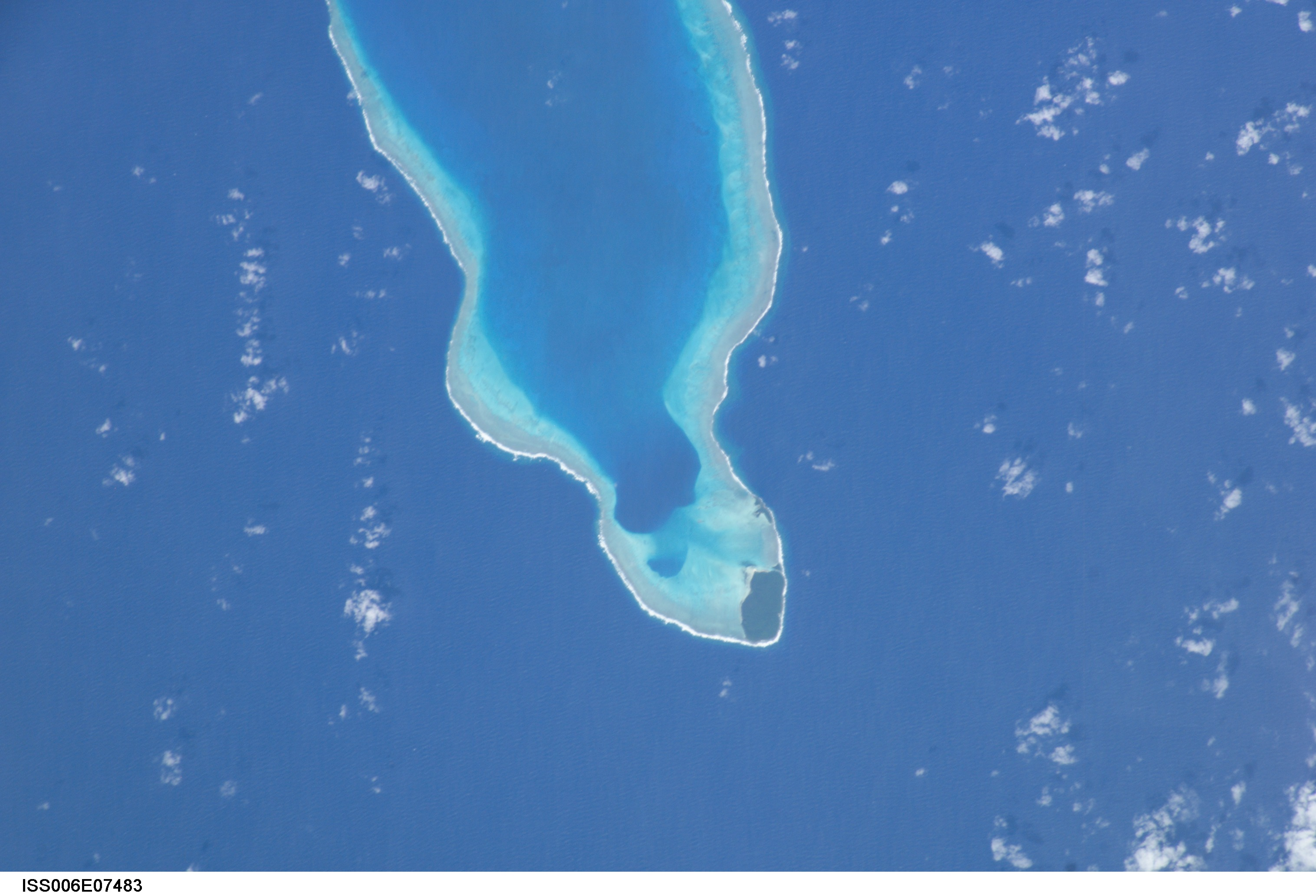
- Qelelevu (main island) and Tauraria.

- Location within Fiji

Geography
- Location: South Pacific Ocean
- Coordinates: 16°08′S 179°15′W
- Archipelago: Ringgold Isles
- Area: 11 ha (27 acres)
- Length: 250 m (820 ft)
- Width: 200 m (700 ft)

Administration
- Fiji
- Division: Eastern Division
- Province: Cakaudrove
- Tikina: Wainikeli

Demographics
- Population: 0

Additional information
- Time zone: FJT (UTC+12)
  - Summer (DST): FJST (UTC+13)

Tauraria is an atoll in Fiji, a member of the Ringgold Isles archipelago, which forms an outlier group to the northern island of Vanua Levu. The uninhabited islet is around 40m north of Qelelevu, and 0.9 km east of Vetauua. Tauraria is a low, upraised and jagged limestone islet covered in dense but scrubby bush. There is a significant population of breeding seabird colonies on Tauraria, especially black-naped terns.

== See also ==
- Desert island
- List of islands
