= Coldwater River (Simcoe County) =

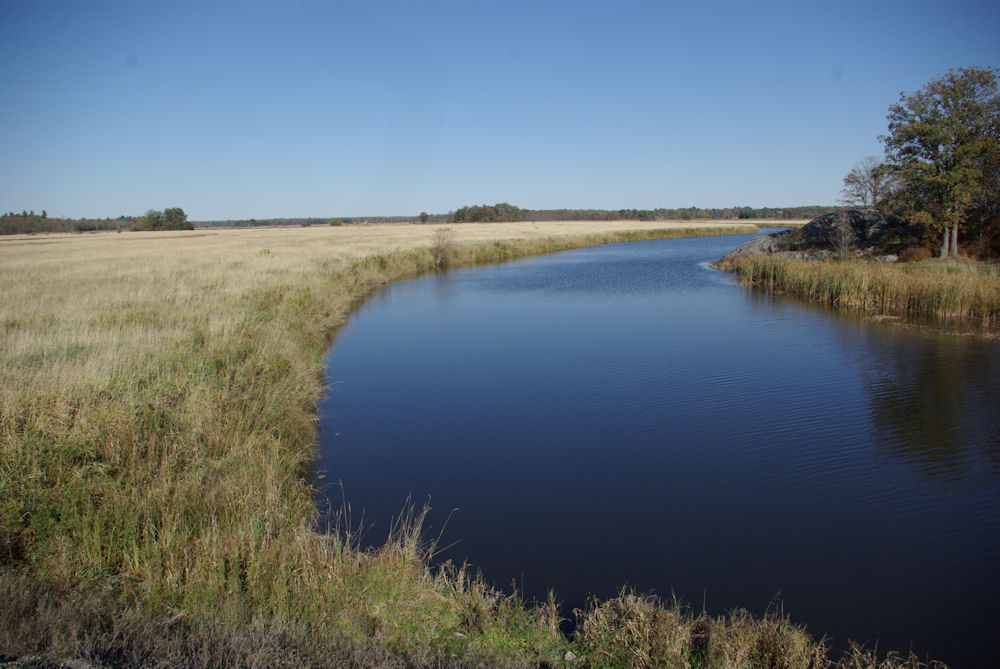
- Coldwater River near the community of Coldwater

- Location of the mouth of the Coldwater River in southern Ontario
- Etymology: From the Ojibwa gisinaa nibiish, "cold pool of water"

Location
- Country: Canada
- Province: Ontario
- Region: Central Ontario
- County: Simcoe

Physical characteristics
- Source: Unnamed lake
  - location: Martinville, Oro-Medonte township
  - coordinates: 44°34′30″N 79°42′17″W
  - elevation: 246 m (807 ft)
- Mouth: Matchedash Bay
  - location: Fesserton, Severn township
  - coordinates: 44°44′06″N 79°39′03″W
  - elevation: 176 m (577 ft)

Basin features
- River system: Great Lakes Basin
- Tributaries
  - right: North River

The Coldwater River is a river in Simcoe County in Central Ontario, Canada. It is in the Great Lakes Basin and flows from the Oro moraine west of Lake Simcoe to Lake Huron. The river is believed to take its name from its Ojibwa name gisinaa nibiish, which means "cold pool of water".

The river offers canoe and kayak routes suitable for novice paddlers. A common launching point is in the village of Coldwater, Ontario.

== Course ==
The Coldwater River begins at the outflow from a small dammed lake, next to Ontario Highway 400, at Martinville in the municipality of Oro-Medonte and adjacent to the Oro Moraine. The lake was created as part of the Copeland Forest Resource Management Area by Ducks Unlimited. It heads northeast to the community of Eady, then north north-west to the eponymous community of Coldwater in the incorporated township of Severn, where it is crossed by Ontario Highway 12, at this point part of the Trans-Canada Highway. It continues in the same direction, through the Matchedash Bay Provincial Wilderness Area, and takes in the right tributary North River just before turning west to its mouth, near the community of Fesserton, at Catfish Bay, a sub-bay of Matchedash Bay, itself a sub-bay of Georgian Bay on Lake Huron.

== Economy ==
The river valley is used as a route by both Ontario Highway 400 and by the Canadian Pacific Railway transcontinental main line, Mactier Subdivision.

The valley sides are the location of several ski areas including Mount St. Louis Moonstone on the west slopes and the Horseshoe Resort on the east slopes.

== Tributaries ==
- North River

== See also ==
- List of rivers of Ontario
