= List of Paradise Falls episodes =

Episode listing of a Canadian soap opera

Paradise Falls is a Canadian weekly soap opera that aired on the Showcase channel. The series was set in the summer cottage community of Muskoka, Ontario. The show's premise was that the Town of Paradise Falls' cottage life was not one would expect – beneath its idyllic surface lurked scandal, murder, deceit, betrayal, steamy love affairs and political intrigue.

The first season of the series, which consists of 52 episodes, aired on Showcase in 2001. Season 2 consisted of 26 episodes, but was not produced and aired until 2004, due to the series producers' difficulty in raising money for a second season. The third season also consisted of 26 episodes. Season 3 first aired on the American premium cable channel Here! TV starting in April 2008; the third season did not premiere on the original broadcaster Showcase channel until September 1, 2009.

== Series overview ==
Season	Episodes	Originally released	
Season	Episodes	First released	Last released
1	52	June 25, 2001	December 17, 2001
2	26	September 18, 2004	December 11, 2004
3	26	April 11, 2008	September 26, 2008

== Episodes ==
=== Season 1 (2001) ===
No. overall	No. in season	Title	Original release date
1	1	"Where's Sarah Braga?"	June 25, 2001
As the series opens, Sarah Braga hasn't been seen by anyone for over two weeks and her son Nick Braga is worried. Just back from college with his beautiful fiancée Jessica Lansing, Nick is at odds with his grandfather, Mayor Pete Braga. The mayor believes that Sarah is off on a drinking spree. Meanwhile, David Silverman is a tourist in Paradise Falls looking to relax, hike, and sketch by the water. David's plans are quickly changed when a mysterious young woman skinny-dipping in the lake approaches him.
2	2	"Yvonne's Surprise"	June 25, 2001
Yvonne is flabbergasted to find her father is alive. Mayor Pete Braga tries to extort an early wedding gift from George Mansfield. The Mayor secretly watches his grandson Nick make love on the stairs with his fiancée Jessica.
3	3	"The Truth About Pamela"	July 2, 2001
Pamela exposes her mysterious secrets. Mayor Pete reveals the truth to Bea on why Sarah Braga left town. Yvonne and her father Dominic set eyes on each other after 14 years.
4	4	"Yvonne Takes Charge"	July 2, 2001
Roxy catches boyfriend Michael in an uncompromising position. Francis has an eerie vision. Nick has second thoughts on his wedding plans. George finds his new tenant naked in the hot tub. Yvonne is threatened by an old associate.
5	5	"The Body"	July 9, 2001
Pamela envisions an attack and a dead woman. David and Pamela's clothes are stolen as they go skinny-dipping. Nick finds his mother.
6	6	"The Day After"	July 9, 2001
Yvonne and Dominic open up old wounds. George and Yvonne become business partners. Tony asks Rose out.
7	7	"Rose's Date"	July 16, 2001
Rose rekindles an old romance. Yvonne finds a surprise in Pete's office. A big city homicide detective is assigned to solve the Braga case. Pete and the detective have a showdown.
8	8	"The Mask"	July 16, 2001
Pamela is being watched by a dangerous presence. Rose and her date get wet. Yvonne's cottage is ransacked. Michael starts videotaping unsuspecting subjects.
9	9	"The Funeral"	July 23, 2001
Sarah Braga's funeral has some fireworks. Tony shows Rose what turns him on at their rendezvous. Pamela shows the sketch of the mask in her visions to Jeff.
10	10	"Goodbye Roxy"	July 23, 2001
Rose sets the ground rules for her father. Rose and Yvonne share some family secrets. Roxy stumbles onto some provocative home movies.
11	11	"Where's Roxy?"	July 30, 2001
Trish finds some compromising footage in Michael's video collection. Yvonne asks her father for money. Francis is panic stricken by Roxy's disappearance.
12	12	"Pete Under Attack"	July 30, 2001
Billy's loon falls below expectations. George threatens Pete. Billy conjures up a vision. Pamela sees Roxy in her trance.
13	13	"The Killer"	August 6, 2001
Yvonne reveals to Rose why she left Paradise Falls. Nick and Jessica renew their vows. Roxy finds a possible escape
14	14	"David's Date"	August 6, 2001
Dominic is roughed up and has a heart attack. Rose takes a flyer with a stranger. Pamela has doubts about David. Francis has another vision.
15	15	"Endgame"	August 13, 2001
Rose finds her date lacking the basics. Dominic desperately tries to hang on as his life is slipping away. Pamela discovers who the night stalker is.
16	16	"Escape"	August 13, 2001
Billy's anger escalates when he finds Jeff comforting Valerie. George reveals to Yvonne why he despises Pete. Jeff makes a connection in the search for the killer.
17	17	"Billy's Jealous"	August 20, 2001
Billy's worst fears come true. Yvonne moves in with Rose. Michael pays for his indiscretions.
18	18	"The Circle"	August 20, 2001
Mourners flock to Dominic Bernini's wake. Trish ventures into the world of witchcraft. Nick has second thoughts about his future. Bea is not pleased with Pete's flirtatious behaviour.
19	19	"Nick's Surprise"	August 27, 2001
Nick is shaken by a visit from an old friend. Trish tries to show Billy a little about herself. Pamela has a vision of another murder.
20	20	"George's Dilemma"	August 27, 2001
Yvonne and Rose are surprised at the reading of their father's will. Jessica asks Simon play a bigger part in the wedding. Pamela comes out of the closet. George reveals to Yvonne's his time to get Pete is running out.
21	21	"The Bachelor Party"	September 3, 2001
A drunken Nick and Simon go skinny-dipping in the lake. Trish reveals to Billy her modeling skills. George and Yvonne finalize their business relationship. Jessica finds her world shattered.
22	22	"Help!"	September 3, 2001
Nick and Simon come to a crossroad. Rose finds an unknown key in her father's personal belongings. Brick gives Michael a warning. Pamela sees Dominic writing a note in a trance. Nick and Jessica don't see eye to eye on their future.
23	23	"Payback"	September 10, 2001
Jessica burns Nick badly. Roxy has a frightening nightmare. Rose finds letters from a mysterious woman in a cigar box.
24	24	"The Plan"	September 10, 2001
Pamela figures out what her last vision means. George puts together the final pieces in his dramatic plan to get Pete Braga. Pete finds out the truth about Nick.
25	25	"Satisfaction"	September 17, 2001
Michael catches Pete in a very uncompromising position. Rose asks an old flame for some help. George and Yvonne set up their mark.
26	26	"Goodbye George"	September 17, 2001
George gets his revenge on Pete. Rusty and Michael have some cowboy fun at her cottage. Trish works her magic on Billy.
27	27	"Rose's Turn"	September 24, 2001
Rose discovers a surprising side of her father's life. Pete's pleas of self-defense vanish when George's gun can't be found. An unknown figure performs a ceremony over Sarah Braga's grave.
28	28	"Go to Jail"	September 24, 2001
Pete is unwillingly moved into a new address. Rose and Yvonne interrogate their new family relation. Paradise Falls is visited by the evil eye.
29	29	"Billy the Cheat"	October 1, 2001
Roxy takes an unusual midnight stroll. Rose and Yvonne get an unexpected roommate. Billy and Trish fall prey to a witches spell.
30	30	"Who's Ravenheart"	October 1, 2001
Yvonne's money slips out of her hands. Pamela unmasks the warlock. Valerie finds her husband handcuffed to the bed.
31	31	"Yvonne's Move"	October 8, 2001
Pete finds innocence an expensive proposition. Valerie lets her hair down. Roxy takes Francis for an unusual walk. Pamela raises Ravenheart's consciousness.
32	32	"Grave Surprise"	October 8, 2001
Roxy has a frightening vision. Ravenheart and Trish perform their own magic tricks. New evidence appears to set Pete free. Ravenheart and Trish dig up some unexpected remains
33	33	"Whoops!"	October 15, 2001
Shirley falls hard for Rose. Valerie shows Jeff her bedside manner. Pete shortchanges Yvonne.
34	34	"Jeff's Little Secret"	October 15, 2001
Rose tries to find some "Bad Luck". Jeff hasn't been playing by the book. Pamela and Trish's friendship are tested. A skeleton has a mysterious past.
35	35	"Fatal Attraction"	October 22, 2001
Nick and Simon are stalked. Rose likes running into "bad luck". Francis is still shaken over the little boy's skeleton.
36	36	"Jessica Fights Back"	October 22, 2001
Jessica deflowers Simon. Brick is blackmailed. Tyrone's pet Nancy escapes. Nick learns about Hollywood tricks. Francis is losing her grip.
37	37	"Goodbye Tyrone"	October 29, 2001
Valerie Hunter takes a report from Simon and Nick Braga claiming harassment from Jessica. Valerie then pays a visit to Jessica. Meanwhile, Bea tells Simon that she has a son she hasn’t seen in twenty years.
38	38	"Blackmail"	October 29, 2001
Rusty realizes Brick's life is in danger. Francis reveals the identity of the skeleton. Pete surprises Bea with some forward conversation. Brick receives a blackmail note.
39	39	"Bea's Surprise"	November 5, 2001
The Mansfield estate is taken over by new management. Michael's trip to Hollywood is cancelled. Francis relives a tragic event. Bea's son exposes the family tree.
40	40	"Pete and Jessica"	November 5, 2001
Yvonne Bernini (Chantal Quesnelle) urges Rose Bernini (Tammy Isbell) to take a vacation. Later, Yvonne invites the Admiral (Andrew Gillies) to the boutique to help her sell it. Meanwhile, Bea Sutton (Dixie Seatle) explains to Samuel Sutton (Josh Peace) why she chose to become a woman. Samuel says he hates her for making that choice. Afterwards Pamela Harman (Cherilee Taylor) meets Samuel sitting alone and invites him for a walk where they get to know each other. Also, Billy Hunter (Allen Altman) hears from Bea that Detective Jeff Bradshaw (Robert Seeliger) is married. Billy tells Sergeant Valerie Hunter (Marni Thompson). Shortly after, Valerie confronts Jeff regarding his marriage. He doesn’t see anything wrong with what he’s done. Later on, Valerie softens towards Billy. Elsewhere, Rusty Sinclair (Carla Collins) and Brick Madison (Gary Hudson) receive a blackmail note asking for $50,000. Across town, Mayor Pete Braga (Art Hindle) shows his disgust and hatred for Bea. Soon after, the Admiral tells Pete he doesn’t own the Lakeview property. Then Pete and Jessica Lansing (Kim Schraner) comfort in each other and have passionate sex.
41	41	"Neil's Return"	November 12, 2001
Rose finds herself touched by her new family relation. Francis exposes her diaries to Sergeant Hunter. Rusty and Brick have to pay through the nose. Nick confronts Pete on his love life.
42	42	"Teamwork"	November 12, 2001
Yvonne and Shirley become reluctant business partners. Billy and Valerie rekindle their vows. Francis Hunter's diaries reveal a shocking affair.
43	43	"Goodbye Rose"	November 19, 2001
Bea's holdings are jeopardized. Yvonne and Shirley do some quick estate planning as Rose leaves for Italy. Pamela and Josh eat each other up. Brick and Rusty's s life take a turn for the worse. A new member of the Sinclair household turns on Michael.
44	44	"Blackmailer Revealed"	November 19, 2001
Brick's blackmailer is exposed. Roxy finds out information on her real father. Clive makes Nick an offer he can't refuse.
45	45	"Michael Takes Charge"	November 26, 2001
Michael and Brick reluctantly come to terms with each other. Rose returns home to find her future in extreme jeopardy. Michael finds out the brains behind Brick's blackmail.
46	46	"Rose's Revenge"	November 26, 2001
Valerie's reveals her family secret. Rose takes her life back. Michael demands top dollar for his work.
47	47	"Trish's Surprise"	December 3, 2001
Trish embraces a new girlfriend. Roxy is contacted by her father. Yvonne moves in on the Admiral.
48	48	"Goodbye Bea"	December 3, 2001
Billy's duck is exposed to the public. Yvonne learns the Admiral has a secret. Bea is touched by an angel. The blackmailer contacts Rusty with new demands.
49	49	"Caught You"	December 10, 2001
Nick finds his most important possessions stolen. The blackmailer escalates his demands. Michael's room has been ransacked but he has insurance. Trudy walks in her mother and Michael in an uncompromising position.
50	50	"The Admiral's Secret"	December 10, 2001
Jessica pretends to Pete she hasn’t seen the photos of him molesting her. Pete tells her there’s a gun in the bedroom and afterwards Jessica takes it. Elsewhere, Roman romances Rose and pleasures her both manually and mechanically.
51	51	"Goodbye Francis"	December 17, 2001
Francis floats her troubles away. Yvonne and the Admiral come to a mutual understanding. Valerie reads Jeff his rights.
52	52	"The Final Twist"	December 17, 2001
The killer's not wrapped. Jessica leaves town fit for a queen. Rusty and Pete come together in a deal. Yvonne and Rose start anew. Valerie and Billy prepare to be parents. Roxy moves back home.

=== Season 2 (2004) ===
No. overall	No. in season	Title	Original release date
53	1	"Bottom's Up"	September 18, 2004
Pete develops a relationship with Kelly. Rose's Birthday. A gay bed and breakfast opens in town and have men running naked through town to celebrate the grand opening. Francis starts a petition to get rid of the B and B. Yvonne hangs out with Michael.
54	2	"The Seduction"	September 18, 2004
Val takes Jackson to work and puts him at risk. Yvonne and Michael's relationship heats up. Bradshaw comes back to town and tells Pamela good news about David. Nick comes back from L.A. Bea meets a nice guy.
55	3	"The Frog"	September 25, 2004
Roxy finds a new friend in Paradise Falls while Pamela has a scary vision which Samuel doesn't understand. Maternal instincts aren't quite so easy for Val and the Admiral's plan has an effect on Pete, Yvonne and Michael.
56	4	"Rose's Offer"	September 25, 2004
Roxy takes Travis home to meet her mother but unsurprisingly Francis doesn't approve of him. Rose is in search for a guy so that she can have a baby.
57	5	"The Sacrifice"	October 2, 2004
According to Pamela's vision Samuel is in danger. Sascha goes after his new crush Nick while Billy hopes Val will get closer to him.
58	6	"The Last Straw"	October 2, 2004
Yvonne and Michael make some serious plans to get The Admiral out the way while Pete and Kelly kiss at the casino. Pete's in trouble when Francis and Travis find out that they both want to take him down.
59	7	"Tangled Web"	October 9, 2004
Francis and Travis come up with a scheme to get Pete's money to pay for Roxy's college fees. Meanwhile Bea enjoys a day out with Thomas.
60	8	"A Woman's Scorn"	October 9, 2004
Money seems to be going in and out of both The Admiral and Pete's hands while Rose is not so sure about Tony's bedroom antics.
61	9	"Goodbye Charlie"	October 16, 2004
Now that 'The Admiral' has gone, Michael and Kelly celebrate by going on a trip. Roxy and Francis's plan to skip town with Pete's money is ruined when Charlie beats them to it.
62	10	"As Time Goes By"	October 16, 2004
Billy and Val try to give their marriage another go but it doesn't seem to work while Samuel finds it hard to get through to Pamela after she had her visions.
63	11	"Most Wanted"	October 23, 2004
Sacha's friend Johnny comes to Paradise Falls with the intention to make trouble. Charlie and the money are still missing while Pete causes trouble at the Inn.
64	12	"Phone Call from an Old Friend"	October 23, 2004
Pete is scared that Roxy has gone missing again while Val has to tell Billy that Jackson isn't his son, Jeff is the real father.
65	13	"What's the Hold Up?"	October 30, 2004
Rose and Tony's relationship is starting to fall apart while confrontation between Kirk and Pete gets out of hand. The petition for the B&B to close is ripped up by Francis who, along with Roxy, is worried about some missing money.
66	14	"Over and Out"	October 30, 2004
Shirley returns to Paradise Falls while Bea gets shot during a confrontation and Val attempts to save her.
67	15	"Fall Out!"	November 6, 2004
Billy gets some help with Jackson when Rose babysits but has lost Val and Jeff wants a confrontation with him about Jackson. Meanwhile, Bea causes an argument between Pete and Thomas.
68	16	"Billy's Worst Nightmare"	November 6, 2004
Trish and Charlie are caught out by Travis who is surprised to see them together. Yvonne has Shirley arrange for her to win if she enters a talent show while Billy finds out it was Francis who did the website scam.
69	17	"Pete Makes His Move"	November 13, 2004
Bea can't decide whom to pick, her past love Pete or her new attraction for Thomas? Meanwhile, Billy is struggling to cope with losing his baby. Charlie plans to take Trish and Travis on a getaway.
70	18	"Paradise Falls Superstar"	November 13, 2004
Shirley's hope to win the talent show doesn't go to plan. Nick wants to know about his real father and he only wants to know the truth. Meanwhile Pamela gets a marriage proposal.
71	19	"Mother Love"	November 20, 2004
Bea insists on helping out with Pamela's wedding to Samuel. Roxy accidentally walks in on a threesome which even surprises her. Tony still wants to be with Rose while Pamela meets Samuel's mother.
72	20	"Old Friends"	November 20, 2004
Pamela postpone's her wedding to satisfy Anne's persistence. Yvonne feels unsafe around Charlie while Francis thinks Sascha is cheating her out of her own money with his paintings.
73	21	"Bye Bye Baby"	November 27, 2004
Trish meets a potential love interest while Billy learns a shocking secret and Charlie invades Johnny's personal life.
74	22	"Through the Looking Glass"	November 27, 2004
Newly independent Francis and Roxy celebrate their success while Nick begins to descend to an all time low. Pamela and Samuel's relationship stays strong even through Anne's plans to ruin it.
75	23	"The Dark Side"	December 4, 2004
Ben and Thomas have a big confrontation after Ben finds Trish in a certain situation. Meanwhile Billy hits a new low and no one can help him.
76	24	"The Real Thing"	December 4, 2004
Thomas is getting sick of the town while Anne tries even harder to stop her son's wedding.
77	25	"Deep Cuts"	December 11, 2004
Billy is slowly dealing with the secrets he's learnt lately. Sacha and Nick admit their love for each other finally. Samuel confronts his mother Anne after finding out her plans to stop his wedding.
78	26	"Another Day"	December 11, 2004
Bea finds out the truth about Pete and she doesn't like it. Rose has some happy news to share and Anne gives a resolution to her son Samuel's marriage to Pamela.

=== Season 3 (2008) ===
All season 3 episodes aired on Here! TV in the United States, premiering in April 2008, before they aired on Showcase in Canada, where season 3 premiered in September 2009.

No. overall	No. in season	Title	Original release date
79	1	"You're All Invited..."	April 11, 2008
It's a wedding in Paradise Falls to kick off Season 3 of the saucy soap. Frances wasn't invited, but that doesn't stop her from showing up drunk and causing a scene.
80	2	"Stardust"	April 11, 2008
Frances continues to drink and tries to steal from two unwitting hikers who have wandered into the Marina before setting off for the night to camp in the wilderness.
81	3	"War of the Words"	April 25, 2008
Trish continues to move in on the new cop in town, Rose wishes Tony would marry her, and Bea gets Pete all riled up about renewing the now rundown Paradise Falls.
82	4	"Great Expectations"	April 25, 2008
The movie crew that arrives at the B&B isn't what Sacha bargained for, Cate begins to learn the truth about Trish, and Bea tries to decide if she should run for mayor.
83	5	"Close Encounters"	May 9, 2008
Frances awakens in the woods with the memory of seeing something other worldly. While Colin schemes, Sacha tries to hide the details of the movie being filmed at the B&B.
84	6	"The Long Wait"	May 9, 2008
The campaign for mayor continues to heat up. Ethan tries to make a move on Roxy, but he's hiding something. Trish keeps trying to ease Cate's mind about her sordid past.
85	7	"Winners & Losers"	May 23, 2008
Tony and Rose continue to fight over money and Rose's lottery card addiction. Sacha aims for a B&B with class. Frances finds someone who believes her, but is he real?
86	8	"Alone in a Crowd"	May 23, 2008
Rose gives Tony her good news, but his secret past could complicate things. Colin continues to tempt Nick away from Sacha. Bea is interviewed by the local paper.
87	9	"Girlfriends"	June 6, 2008
Yvonne is back in town with a juicy secret. Roxy finds out the truth about Ethan and it doesn't go over well. Frances has taken her new friend's advice and quit drinking.
88	10	"The Wager"	June 6, 2008
Bea steps up her run for Mayor and makes a winner takes all bet with Pete. Tony's divorce could end up being more complicated than he originally planned.
89	11	"The Unforgiven"	June 20, 2008
The porno shoot wraps at the B&B. Colin continues to destroy Nick and Sacha's marriage. Cate deals a blow to Trish. The mysterious Tarkin makes his return in the woods.
90	12	"The Eyes Have It"	June 20, 2008
Roxy tries to keep Frances away from Tarkin. Trish is back to her old tricks. Then we find out who has been bankrolling Colin's attempts to break up Sacha and Nick.
91	13	"The Big Chill"	July 4, 2008
Jessica's back in town and no one is happy to see her. Nick and Sacha try to keep it together. Yvonne and Colin both get to work on winning their bet over Tucker.
92	14	"Following Orders"	July 4, 2008
Nick confronts Jessica about her return to Paradise Falls. Yvonne takes the bet very seriously. Frances is pulled deeper into Tarkin's magnetism.
93	15	"True Confessions"	July 18, 2008
Cate reveals the truth about Ethan to a startled Trish. Rose battles it out with Tony's ex-wife. Sacha and Nick have a blowup over their relationship... again.
94	16	"Truth or Brownies"	July 18, 2008
Pete takes his turn confronting the delusional Jessica. Bea renews her mayoral run in the midst of controversy. Rose lets loose at her unconventional bridal shower.
95	17	"Revelations"	August 1, 2008
Frances finds herself sucked into Tarkin's world. Wes loses his job at the paper and focuses on Bea's election campaign. Roxy gets caught up in trying to save Frances.
96	18	"Unexpected Guests"	August 1, 2008
Cate gets a visit from her past that makes Trish suspicious. Rose puts her foot down about Lynnie's wedding. Roxy and Frances are trapped with Tarkin.
97	19	"Capture and Escape"	August 15, 2008
Ethan is determined to save Roxy. Nick demands that Colin be fired, but he gets sidetracked when Colin suggests one last tryst. Jessica moves forward with her plan.
98	20	"Dearly Beloved"	August 15, 2008
Lynnie's wedding moves forward according to Rose's specifications. Colin confesses to Sacha. Rose finds out the truth about the origin of Wendy's name.
99	21	"Outed"	August 29, 2008
It's Pride Day in Paradise Falls and Pete tries to shut down the operation much to everyone's dismay. Sacha is still worried about Nick. Roxy reveals the truth to Ethan.
100	22	"Ultimatums"	August 29, 2008
In the 100th episode of Paradise Falls, Jessica tries her best to take her plans to fruition. Sacha yells at Bea about the married Wes. Rose gives all of her money to Yvonne who may or may not be pregnant.
101	23	"Crash!"	September 12, 2008
Pete attempts a last minute ditch effort at campaigning for mayor. Colin finally reveals the location of Nick and Jessica. Rose and Yvonne argue about the supposed baby.
102	24	"Fault Lines"	September 12, 2008
Yvonne is in the hospital and is pretty beat up. Cate attempts to remove Trish from her life. Roxy helps Ethan make sense of the news about his real mother.
103	25	"And the Winner Is..."	September 26, 2008
It's Election Day in Paradise Falls and while Bea is a pile of nerves, Pete drinks all day with Nick. Yvonne is angry about being hurt and takes it out on Rose.
104	26	"Kisses and Goodbyes"	September 26, 2008
Cate tries to run Trish out of Paradise Falls. Pete holds up his end of the bet with Bea, and takes some people with him. Sacha finds comfort in the arms of the enemy.
