= Marni Thompson =

Canadian actress

Marni Thompson is a Canadian actress, whose most extensive starring role was in Paradise Falls, a soap opera on Showcase Television, starting in 2001. She played Valerie Hunter, a bored local police officer in a small community.

Except for her appearance in the film Three to Tango (1999), her acting has been mainly on TV. She has had guest roles on TV series, such as Relic Hunter, The City, Earth: Final Conflict, Power Play, and Psi Factor: Chronicles of the Paranormal. She was also a character on the TV mini-series Robocop: Prime Directives.

Thompson was born Stratford, Ontario and grew up in Toronto.
