= Paradise Falls =

- Season 1 cast
- Created by: Paula J. Smith
- Country of origin: Canada
- No. of seasons: 3
- No. of episodes: 104 (list of episodes)

Production
- Executive producers: Ira Levy and Peter Williamson
- Running time: 30 minutes

Original release
- Network: Showcase Television
- Release: June 25, 2001 – September 26, 2008

Paradise Falls is a weekly soap opera television series which aired nationally on the Showcase channel in Canada, starting in 2001. It was filmed in the summer cottage community of Muskoka, Ontario at Grandview Resort.

Like many major soap operas, sex is a dominant component of the storylines, although more explicit in nature. The show's open approach to sexual and homosexual themes caused the show to be carried on the Here! TV network in the United States, which targets gay and lesbian viewers. Like the soap Passions, murder and a little witchcraft are included in the mix of themes.

== Synopsis ==
Set in the summer cottage municipality of Muskoka, the series premise was that the town of Paradise Falls' cottage life was not what one would expect – beneath its idyllic surface lurked scandal, murder, deceit, betrayal, steamy love affairs and political intrigue.

== Episodes ==
Season	Episodes	Originally released	
Season	Episodes	First released	Last released
1	52	June 25, 2001	December 17, 2001
2	26	September 18, 2004	December 11, 2004
3	26	April 11, 2008	September 26, 2008

== Production ==
Unlike the typical studio based soap opera, the series was shot entirely on location on Sparrow Lake in Muskoka and Whitevale, Ontario, which gave the show an authentic looking background. It was produced entirely in digital format, to reduce production costs, and allow for easier editing when adapted for foreign markets. The show's production company is Breakthrough Entertainment.

The production schedule has been somewhat unorthodox and unpredictable for viewers. An initial 52 episodes were shot in a batch in 2001, then aired that year on Showcase. After the first season had finished airing, no new episodes were seen until 2004, as the producers had difficulty raising money for a second season. A second season of 26 episodes aired, beginning in September 2004.

The show was dormant again until it was announced in August 2007 that filming had begun on a third batch of 26 episodes. This third group of episodes started airing on April 11, 2008 on the American premium cable channel Here! TV, but the third season did not premiere on Showcase until September 1, 2009.

== Cast and characters ==
- Art Hindle as Mayor Pete Braga. He has been mayor for over 20 years, and is a ruthless businessman. He tries to control everything in town. He is the father of Roxy Hunter and grandfather of Nick Braga.
- Chantal Quesnel as Yvonne Bernini. She is the sister of Rose Bernini. She returns to town after 14-year absence.
- Tammy Isbell as Rose Bernini. She owns and operates the Bernini Boutique that specializes in wedding dresses, and is engaged to Tony Beroni.
- Dixie Seatle as Bea Sutton. She is the owner/operator of the local Marina and a central figure in town. She is the ex-fiancé of Pete Braga, ex-girlfriend of Thomas Martinelli and ex-husband of Anne Sutton. She falls for Wes Coleman, and runs for mayor against Pete. It is revealed that she is a transgender woman.
- Victoria Snow as Francis Hunter. She is the alcoholic mother of Roxy Hunter, whom she raised in poverty.
- Cameron Graham as Nick Braga. He is the grandson of Pete, and Jessica's former fiancé. He is gay and married to Sacha.
- Kim Poirier as Roxy Hunter. She is the daughter of Frances Hunter and Pete Braga, and the ex-girlfriend of Michael Mansfield and Travis Piercy.
- Michelle Latimer as Trish Simpkin. A goth teen who acts tougher than she really is. She is tri-sexual.
- Steve Cumyn as Tony Beroni. He is a flamboyant radio broadcaster, and is engaged to Rose Bernini. He is the ex-husband of Lynnie Jordan.
- Kim Schraner as Jessica Lansing. Jessica was the fiancée of Nick Braga. In their backstory, they met in college and were engaged for three years. She comes back to town get revenge on him (seasons 1 and 3)
- Cherilee Garofano as Pamela Harman. She is a waitress at the Marina. She is secretly a witch. She is also the fiancée of Samuel Sutton (seasons 1–2)
- Allen Altman as Billy Hunter. He is an artist, and the husband of Valerie. He creates Paradise Falls' large tourism mascot (a large loon with breasts) (seasons 1–2)
- Joshua Peace as Samuel Sutton (seasons 1–2). He is the son of Bea and Anne Sutton, and the fiancé of Pamela Harman.
- Marni Thompson as Valerie Hunter (seasons 1–2). She is a local police officer. She is married to Billy who falls pregnant with Jeff Bradshaw's baby, a boy named Jackson. She gets shot and killed at the marina.
- Andrew Gillies as Stanley 'The Admiral' Mansfield (seasons 1–2). He is the supposed English relative of Michael Mansfield.
- Robert Seeliger as Jeff Bradshaw (seasons 1–2). He is a homicide detective. He has an affair with Valerie, and leaves her pregnant. Their son is named Jackson.
- Jim Thorburn as Michael Mansfield (seasons 1–2). He is a high school drop-out and chronic underachiever. He is the ex-boyfriend of Roxy Hunter. He later runs out of town with Kelly Fairview.
- Debra McGrath as Shirley Armstrong (seasons 1–2). She is the radio host from Fenmore who has had a secret affair with Dominic Bernini.
- Martin Roach as Ravenheart (season 1). He is a visiting warlock con-man and Pamela's ex.
- Carla Collins as Rusty Sinclair (season 1). She is an American actress who doesn't realize her star has faded.
- Gary Hudson as Brick Madison (season 1). He is an American actor, and former action star, with a cocaine addiction.
- Bill MacDonald as George Mansfield (season 1). He never got over the suicide of his wife Lisa years ago. He is shot to death by Pete.
- Grant Nickalls as David Silverman (season 1). He is a tourist renting a cottage. He murders Sarah, kidnaps Roxy, and tries to murder his girlfriend, Pamela.
- Kris Holden-Ried as Simon, Nick’s former lover (season 1)
- Karen Racicot as Sarah Braga (season 1)
- Ian D. Clark as Dominic Bernini. He is a retired widower who has had a secret affair with Shirley Armstrong (season 1)
- Patrick Stevenson as Austin (season 1)
- Yank Azman as the lawyer, Mr. Bloom (season 1)
- Peter Outerbridge as Tyrone Fox, another one of Rose's dates who gets run over by Brick Madison (season 1)
- Ker Wells as Roman Wiancek, a male escort who "dates" Rose (season 1)
- Kristen Booth as Trudy Sinclair, Rusty's daughter, a bisexual teen who has a romance with Trish (season 1)
- Mark Ellis as Neil Armstrong, the son of Shirley. He also dates Rose (season 1)
- Kent Staines as Clive, the shifty, gay script writer (season 1)
- Harrison Wayne as the childlike apparition (Frances and Billy Hunter's dead brother) (season 1)
- Salvatore Antonio as Sacha Martinelli. He is the son of Thomas Martinelli. He runs a gay B&B, and falls for Nick Braga whom he marries (seasons 2–3)
- Frank Pellegrino as Thomas Martinelli (season 2). He is the father of Sacha, and the ex-boyfriend of Bea Sutton.
- Mike Realba as Ben Santos, the police officer (season 2)
- Kate Trotter as Anne Sutton, Bea's psychotic ex-wife (season 2)
- Alan Van Sprang as Johnny Brice, the gay hockey star (season 2)
- David Ferry as Kirk, Nick's jailed father (season 2)
- Raven Dauda as Kelly Fairview. She runs out of town with Michael Mansfield (season 2)
- Sean Bell as Travis Piercy. He is the brother of Charlie, and the ex-boyfriend of Roxy Hunter (season 2)
- Danielle Hampton as Charlene 'Charlie' Piercy. She is the sister of Travis, and the ex-girlfriend of Trish (season 2)
- Steve Belford as Colin Wagner. He works at the B&B, and helps Jessica Lansing get revenge on Nick (season 3)
- Meredith McGeachie as Cate Banning. She is a local police officer. She is the sister of Ethan Banning, and the girlfriend of Trish Simpkin and the ex-girlfriend of Julie Cordry (season 3)
- Mark Humphrey as Wes Coleman. He is a reporter for the Paradise Falls Chronicle. He falls for Bea Sutton even though he's married (season 3)
- Julie Brown as Mimi Van Lux, a porn film director (season 3)
- Amanda Brugel as Lynnie Jordan, the ex-wife of Tony Beroni (season 3)
- Kerry Lai Fatt as Julie Cordry, the ex-girlfriend of Cate Banning (season 3)
- Stephen Huszar as porn star, Tucker Hardwood (season 3)
- Wesley Morgan as Ethan Banning. He is the son of Cate Banning, and the boyfriend of Roxy Hunter (season 3)

== Home media ==
It was announced on Kim Poirier's MySpace blog that Paradise Falls would be getting a DVD release. There is no more information currently, though Here! TV confirmed that it planned to release the show.

Season	Cover art	Ep #	Release date	Additional information
1	N/A	52	TBA	DVD announced for release in near future, no extra information available yet.

The third season is available exclusively on Amazon's Video On Demand section and is the first time the show has been available to buy.
