= Cooper's Falls =

- Etymology: Named after Thomas James Cooper
- Location in Southern Ontario
- Coordinates: 44°47′14″N 79°14′00″W
- Country: Canada
- Province: Ontario
- County: Simcoe
- Municipality: Ramara
- Founded: 1864
- Elevation: 240 m (790 ft)
- Time zone: UTC-5 (Eastern Time Zone)
  - Summer (DST): UTC-4 (Eastern Time Zone)
- Postal code: L0K 2B0
- Area codes: 705, 249

Cooper's Falls (or Coopers Falls) is a dispersed rural community and unincorporated place in geographic Rama Township in the municipality of Ramara, Simcoe County, in Central Ontario, Canada. The community is located at the eponymous Coopers Falls waterfall on the Black River, about 5 kilometres (3.1 mi) northeast of the community of Washago on Ontario Highway 11, and is named after Thomas Cooper, the first settler. There are a few families living in Coopers Falls.

== History ==
In 1864, Thomas James Cooper and his wife, Emma and three young children, emigrated to Canada on the steamship "Hector" from Fawkham, England. They arrived in the area from the train in Barrie. From there they proceeded to make their way by boat to Washago. There they set off into the bush to find a location to build their home, in lands that turned out to be occupied by wolves.

Emma and Thomas Cooper built a house and general store half a mile from a waterfall on the Black River. Many years later, in 1878 the first post office opened with the name Cooper's Falls.

The village soon added a general store, blacksmith and cheese factory. A log schoolhouse was built in 1874 followed by two churches. The Methodist church was built in 1894 and the Anglican church was built approximately 1884.

Thomas Cooper had hoped that his town's inhabitants would live good and clean lives. He believed in prohibition and thus, was not pleased when men from the lumber camps would show up in town, drunk.

The town's demise came when the lumber mill closed. The actual waterfall which took the Cooper name sits on private property, but can be seen from Cooper's Falls Road, especially in winter and early spring, when foliage doesn't obstruct the view.

A strand of 14 coloured light bulbs has been strung between the town's former general store and an old wooden building known as "the courthouse".
