= Riley Lake, Ontario =

Riley Lake
- Dispersed rural community
- Location in Southern Ontario
- Coordinates: 44°50′23″N 79°12′13″W
- Country: Canada
- Province: Ontario
- District Municipality: Muskoka
- Town: Gravenhurst
- Elevation: 256 m (840 ft)
- Time zone: UTC-5 (Eastern Time Zone)
  - Summer (DST): UTC-4 (Eastern Time Zone)
- Postal code: P1P 1R3
- Area codes: 705, 249

Riley Lake is a Dispersed rural community and unincorporated place in geographic Ryde Township in the town of Gravenhurst, District Municipality of Muskoka, in Central Ontario, Canada. The community lies on the northwest shore of the eponymous Riley Lake, the source of Riley Creek.
