= Riley Creek (Ontario) =

- Location of the mouth of Riley Creek in Southern Ontario

Location
- Country: Canada
- Province: Ontario

Physical characteristics
- Source: Riley Lake
  - location: Ryde Township, Gravenhurst, District Municipality of Muskoka
  - coordinates: 44°49′05″N 79°10′40″W
  - elevation: 247 m (810 ft)
- Mouth: Black River
  - location: Dalton Township, Kawartha Lakes
  - coordinates: 44°47′48″N 79°09′51″W
  - elevation: 235 m (771 ft)
- Length: 3.5 km (2.2 mi)

Basin features
- River system: Great Lakes Basin

Riley Creek is a stream in the Great Lakes Basin in Central Ontario, Canada. It flows south from its source at Riley Lake in geographic Ryde Township in the municipality of Gravenhurst, District Municipality of Muskoka, to its mouth as a right tributary of the Black River in geographic Dalton Township in the city of Kawartha Lakes. The Black River flows via the Severn River to Georgian Bay on Lake Huron.

About 80% of the creek lies within Queen Elizabeth II Wildlands Provincial Park.
