= Qelelevu =

Island of Fiji

Native name: Nggelelevu
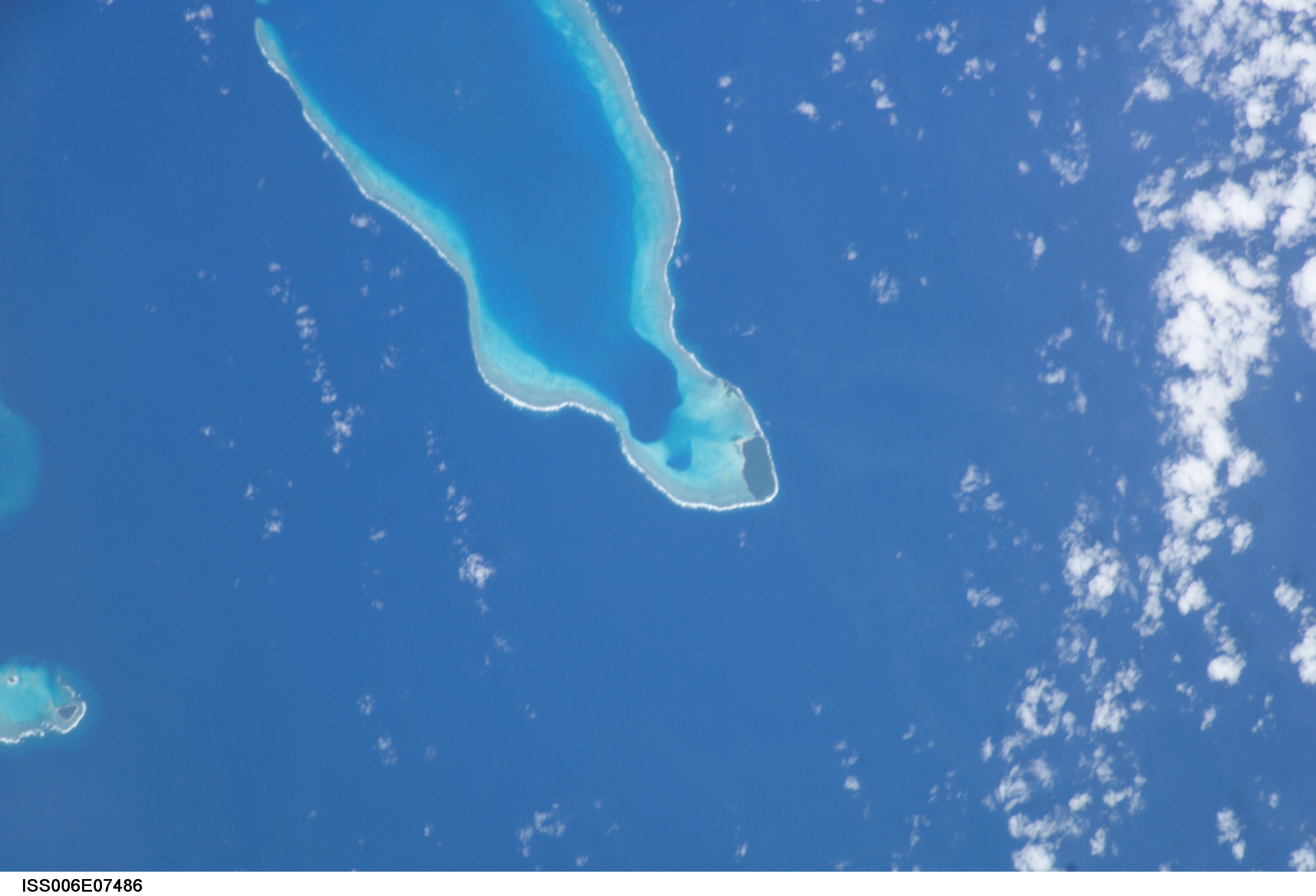
- Qelelevu satellite view

- Location within Fiji

Geography
- Location: South Pacific Ocean
- Coordinates: 16°05′S 179°10′W
- Archipelago: Ringgold Isles
- Area: 1.5 km^{2} (0.58 sq mi)
- Highest elevation: 12 m (39 ft)

Administration
- Fiji
- Division: Eastern Division
- Province: Cakaudrove
- Tikina: Wainikeli
- Largest settlement: Nalutu

Qelelevu or Nggelelevu is a coral islet in Fiji, a member of the Ringgold Isles archipelago, which forms an outlier to the northern island of Vanua Levu.

== Geography ==
Apart from two nearby coral islets, Tai Ni Beka and Tauraria due west on the same atoll rim, it is 30 kilometres (19 mi) from the nearest island, which is Vetauua, to the West. Qelelevu covers an area of 1.5 square kilometres (0.58 mi^{2}; 370 acres; 150 ha). Its maximum elevation is 18 metres (59 ft).

Qelelevu lagoon lies 8 miles (13 km) eastward of Thakau Vuthovutho reef. The lagoon has three main passes allowing boats to enter: Rendell, Deep and Brown. Qelelevu is one of the two only true atolls of Fiji, because it has an island and is not a mere coral reef.

Most of the island is covered in palm trees and bushes.

The small village of Nalutu (16.087453°S 179.151907°W) is located on Qelelevu. Fishing is the only significant economic activity.

The atoll habitat of the island contributes to its national significance as outlined in Fiji's Biodiversity Strategy and Action Plan.

== History ==
Qelelevu may have been first inhabited by people from Futuna. Later in time, people from Laucala arrived and soon dominated the population. Qelelevu has been in the Laucala sphere of influence, as well as other islands like Naitauba, Namalata, Yacata and villages of Vutuna, Daliconi and Mavana on Vanua Balavu.
