= Head Lake, Ontario =

Head Lake
- Dispersed rural community
- Location in Southern Ontario
- Coordinates: 44°43′25″N 78°55′54″W
- Country: Canada
- Province: Ontario
- City: Kawartha Lakes
- Time zone: UTC-5 (Eastern Time Zone)
  - Summer (DST): UTC-4 (Eastern Time Zone)
- Postal code: K0M 2B0
- Area codes: 705, 249

Head Lake is a dispersed rural community and unincorporated place located in the city of Kawartha Lakes, Ontario, Canada, on Head Lake between Uphill (to the west) and Norland (to the east).
