= Matchedash Bay =

Bay in Ontario, Canada

Coordinates: 44°45′11″N 79°40′43″W

Designations

Ramsar Wetland
- Official name: Matchedash Bay
- Designated: 31 October 1996
- Reference no.: 866

Matchedash Bay is a bay and Ramsar wetland in Simcoe County in Central Ontario, Canada. It is the "final inland extension of Severn Sound" on Lake Huron's Georgian Bay, and is "situated at the interface between the Saint Lawrence Lowlands and the Canadian Shield ". It exhibits geologically unique features at the junction of the Canadian Shield and southern Ontario limestone. Wetland habitats in Matchedash Bay are varied, and include swamps, fens, cattail marshes, wet meadows and beaver ponds. Other features include "permanent freshwater lakes; upland hardwood forest, agricultural lands, native grass meadows and a unique, coniferous wetland forest".

A great diversity of species are indigenous to Matchedash Bay, including over 550 species of vascular plants, 34 species of fish, 28 species of mammal and 17 species of reptiles and amphibian, and it supports "one of the greatest diversities of herpeto fauna in Canada". Of the 170 species of birds that nest or breed in Matchedash Bay, some are provincially rare. It is also an important spring and autumn migratory staging area in the province.

Water levels in Matchedash Bay fluctuate constantly in tandem with Lake Huron and the tributary North River and Coldwater River. These water level fluctuations are a natural part of the ecology of Great Lakes wetlands, and are necessary for maintaining the area and diversity of this wetland.

Ducks Unlimited has purchased small portions of the site, for example an 18-hectare (44-acre) purchase in 1996, "to ensure permanent protection" of the area. However, Matchedash Bay is a popular recreational area with cottages and marinas. Urban growth in the surrounding areas is expected to negatively affect the site and its water quality.
