= Quarry Island =

Island in Ontario, Canada

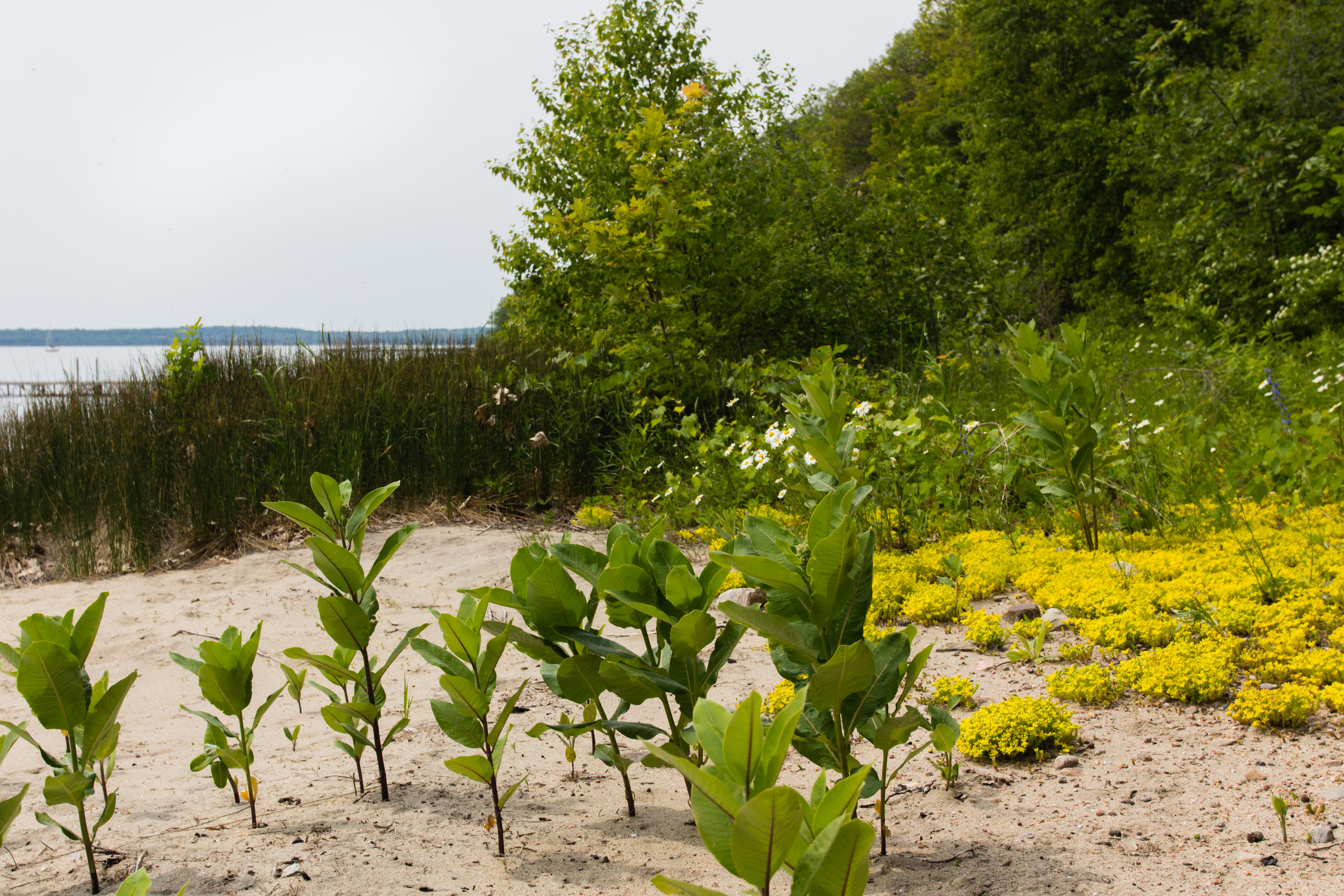
- Sand Beach on Quarry Island

Geography
- Coordinates: 44°49′59″N 79°48′52″W
- Area: 0.8 km^{2} (0.31 sq mi)
- Length: 1.2 km (0.75 mi)
- Width: 0.8 km (0.5 mi)
- Coastline: 3.8 km (2.36 mi)
- Highest elevation: 7 m (23 ft)

Administration
- Canada
- Province: Ontario
- Township: Georgian Bay

Quarry Island is a 200-acre (81-hectare) island located in Southeastern Georgian Bay in Ontario, Canada. The island name is derived from its mining history. Stone from the island was used for the bridge piers on the Canadian Pacific Railway and other projects.

The Island is located near Midland, Ontario and Penetanguishene. To the west is Vennings Bay and Maceys Bay. There are also several other islands to the north, Beausoleil Island, Picnic Island, Brandys Island, and Roberts Island. Georgian Bay Islands National Park is also located to the northwest.

The northern shore is scattered with small rocky outcrops and select areas of marsh. The west and south shore features several cottages with a mixture of sand and rock beaches. The island is largely covered in temperate forest, with a utility trail looping around the interior.
