= Oro Moraine =

Glacial moraine in Ontario, Canada

Coordinates: 44.5424°N 79.6009°W

The Oro Moraine is a glacial moraine in Simcoe County, Ontario, Canada. The moraine covers 141 square kilometres (54 sq mi) north of Barrie, Ontario. The moraine drains into Georgian Bay on Lake Huron, and the smaller Lake Simcoe.

Water transporting layers within the moraine, composed of sand and gravel, are separated by relatively impervious aquitard layers composed of or silt or clay.

Efforts are being made to preserve undeveloped land on the moraine, and to encourage land owners to leave their property as a legacy to the regional conservation authorities in their wills.

== See also ==
- Oak Ridges Moraine
