= Ringgold Isles =

Archipelago in Fiji

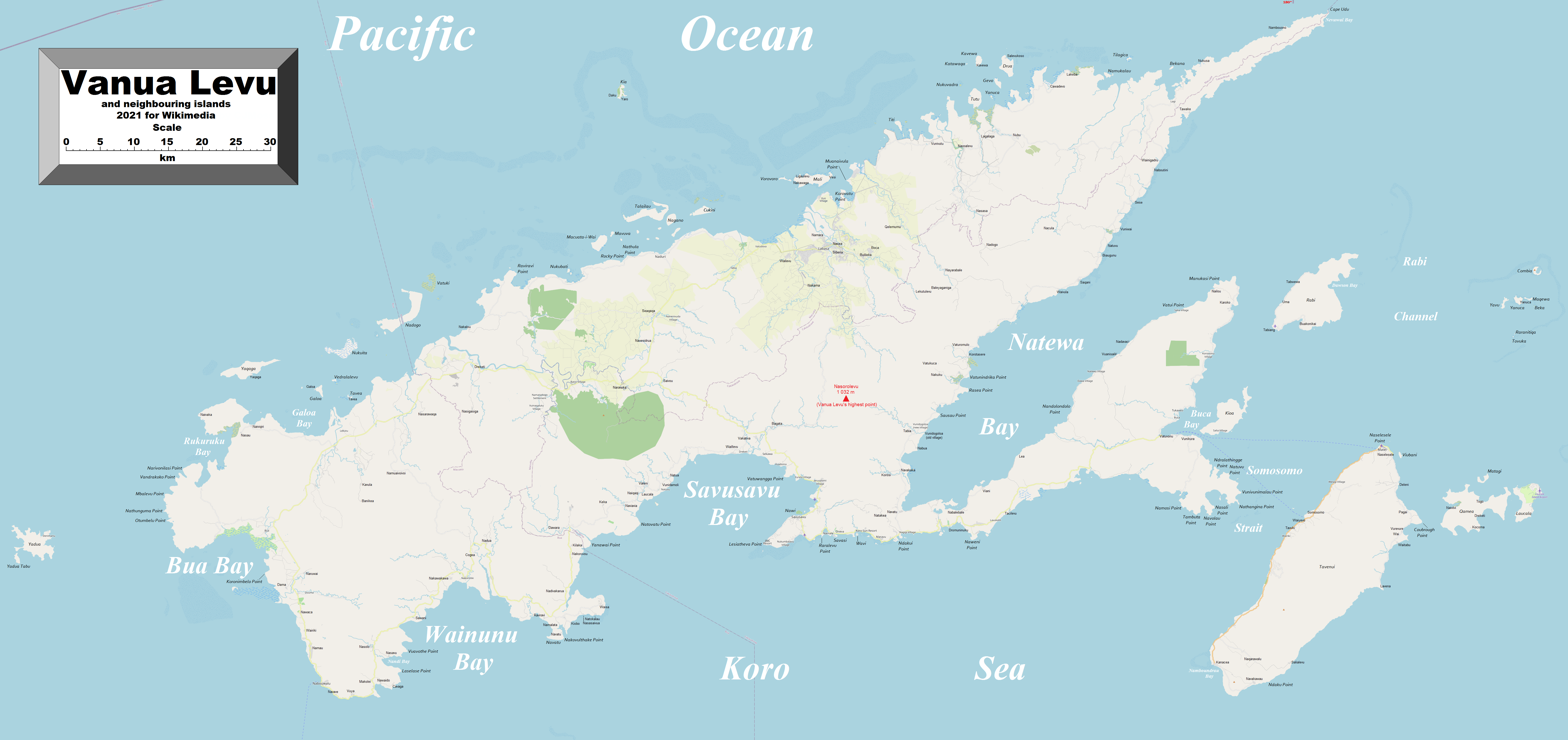
- Enlargeable, detailed map of Vanua Levu with the Ringgold Isles on the extreme right

- Location within Fiji

Geography
- Location: South Pacific Ocean
- Total islands: ca. 15
- Major islands: Qelelevu, Yanuca

Administration
- Fiji
- Division: Eastern Division
- Province: Cakaudrove
- Tikina: Wainikeli
- Largest settlement: Nalutu

Additional information
- Time zone: FJT (UTC+12)
  - Summer (DST): FJST (UTC+13)

The Ringgold Isles are an archipelago in Fiji, forming an outlier group to Vanua Levu. In 1840, Admiral Charles Wilkes named the Isles after Admiral Cadwalader Ringgold who at the time was a lieutenant serving under him during the United States exploring expedition. The Budd, Nukusemanu, and Heemskercq Reefs form part of the group. The group is mostly uninhabited, but Qelelevu has a small village. In 2008 Pacific rats were eradicated from seven islands of the group in an endeavour facilitated by BirdLife International's Fiji Programme.

A 218-hectare (540-acre) area covering the archipelago is the Ringgold Islands Important Bird Area. This area supports globally and regionally significant populations of marine turtles, humpback whales, seabirds and semi-nomadic reef fish, and may hold concentrations of cold-water corals.

== Cobia ==
Cobia is an island in Fiji, and is a member of the Ringgold Isles archipelago, which forms an outlier group to the northern island of Vanua Levu. It has a land area of 69.29 hectares (0.2675 mi^{2}; 171.2 acres).

== Maqewa ==
Maqewa Island is narrow and rocky. It is located at 16°30′S 179°40.99′E and has a total land area of 26.05 hectares (64.4 acres).

== Nukubalati and Nukubasaga ==
Nukubalati and Nukubasaga is a single coral reef composed of two rock-bound islands, one larger than the other.

== Qelelevu ==
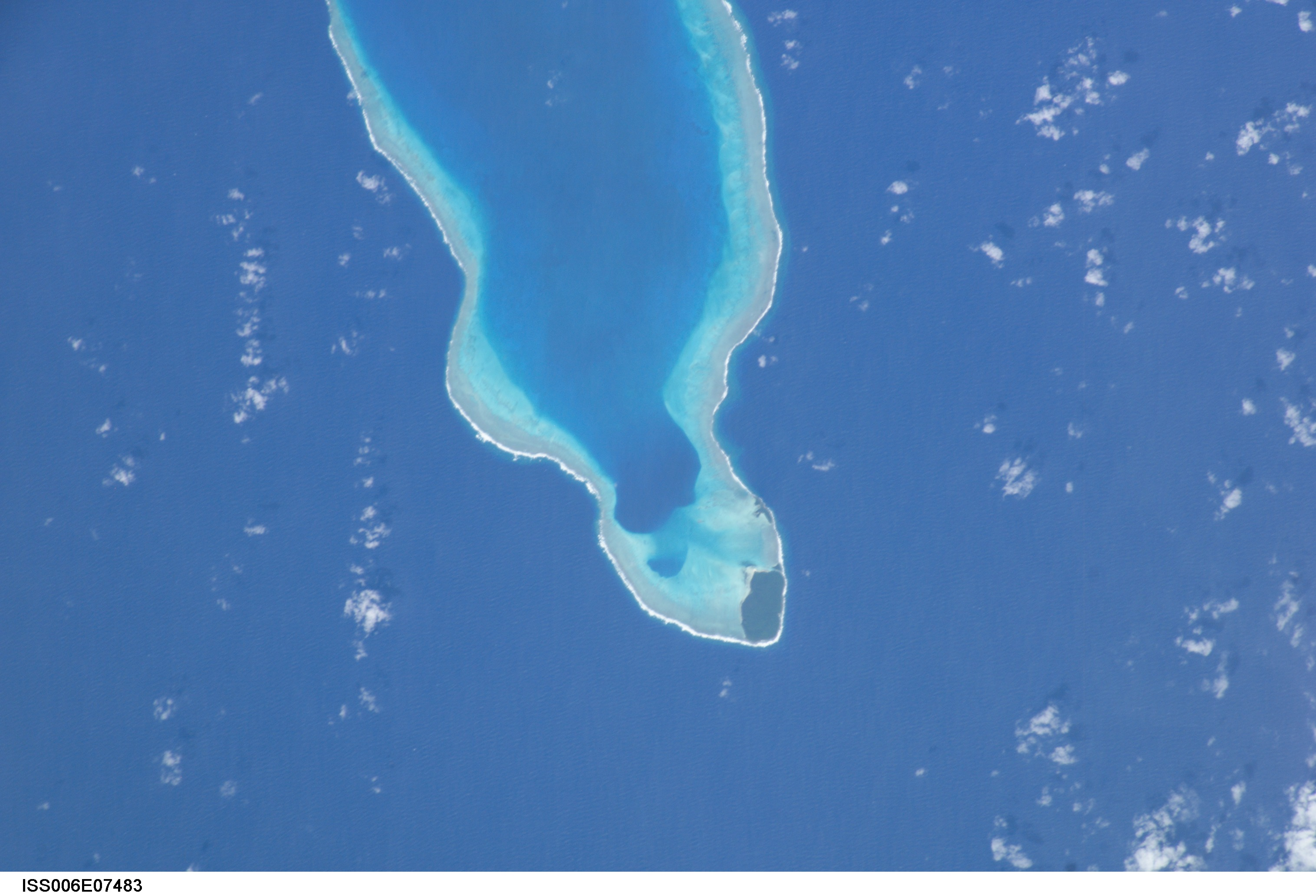
Satellite view of Qelelevu.

Qelelevu is a coral islet in Fiji, a member of the Ringgold Isles archipelago, which forms an outlier to the northern island of Vanua Levu. Apart from three nearby coral islets, it is 80 kilometres (50 mi) from the nearest island. Qelelevu covers an area of 1.5 square kilometres (0.58 mi^{2}; 370 acres; 150 ha). Its maximum elevation is 18 metres (59 ft).

The small village of Nalutu (16.087453°S 179.151907°W) is located on Qelelevu. Fishing is the only significant economic activity.

== Raranitiqa ==
Raranitiqa Island in Fiji, a member of the Ringgold Isles archipelago, which forms an outlier group to the northern island of Vanua Levu. It has a land area of 2.49 hectares (24,900 m^{2}; 6.2 acres).

== Taininbeka ==
Taininbeka is an atoll in Fiji, a member of the Ringgold Isles archipelago, which forms an outlier group to the northern island of Vanua Levu. This uninhabited islet is situated at 16.04°S and 179.09°E, and has a total land area of 144.34 hectares (0.5573 mi^{2}; 356.7 acres).

16°04′S 179°09′E

== Tauraria ==
Tauraria is an atoll in Fiji, a member of the Ringgold Isles archipelago, which forms an outlier group to the northern island of Vanua Levu. This uninhabited islet is situated at 16.04°S and 179.09°E. Its land area is 11.06 hectares (110,600 m^{2}; 27.3 acres).

16°04′S 179°09′E

== Vetauua ==
Vetauua is a small, uninhabited cay.

== Yanuca ==
Yanuca is a small mountainous island, inhabited by approximately 60–80 people who live in a small village in a tiny beach cove.
