= Severn River (Georgian Bay) =

Coordinates: 44.85258°N 79.53157°W

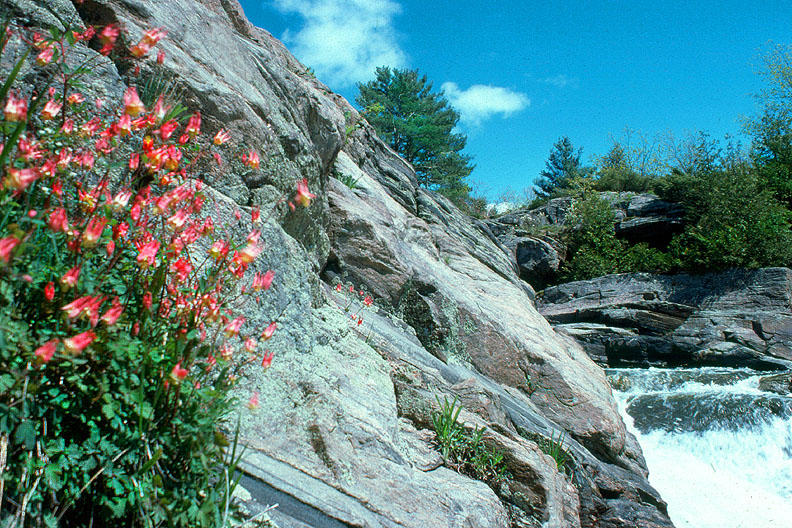

- Location of the mouth of Severn River in Ontario

Location
- Country: Canada
- Province: Ontario

Physical characteristics
- Length: 57 km (35 mi)

The Severn River is a river in central Ontario, Canada. It drains Lake Couchiching and Lake Simcoe. Flowing out of the north end of Lake Couchiching at Washago, it receives its main tributary the Black River from the east. The Severn then flows north into Sparrow Lake before turning west and then south into Gloucester Pool. At Port Severn it drains into Severn Sound, the easternmost extension of Georgian Bay, itself a large bay of Lake Huron.

The Severn forms part of the inland canal system known as the Trent–Severn Waterway, which links Georgian Bay with Trenton on Lake Ontario via the Trent Canal. The river services seasonal cottagers, as many of the properties are accessible only by boat. Some year-round residents live on the Severn. The river sees many boats travelling from Lake Couchiching to Georgian Bay and vice versa. From the middle of the 19th century up until the completion of the canal in 1920, the Severn was used to transport logs to sawmills down river. There are two hydroelectric stations at falls located on its course.

The Severn River proper is 57 kilometres (35 mi) long, and drops 43 metres (141 ft) between Lake Couchiching and Severn Sound. If the Black River is considered part of the same river, the overall length of the combined Black–Severn river is 225 kilometres (140 mi). Together with the Black River and Lakes Couchiching and Simcoe, the Severn drains an area of 5,832 square kilometres (2,252 sq mi). The mean annual daily discharge at the mouth of the Severn over the period 1996-2003 was just over 82 cubic metres per second.

Located on the Severn just before it enters Gloucester Pool, Big Chute Marine Railway is a rare operational marine railway. The Big Chute is a major tourist attraction, and provides access to and from Gloucester Pool. The River sees many overnight campers, although overnight camping is forbidden on many sections of the Severn, including Lost Channel (location of the old fire tower) and Pretty Channel. This law is enforced by police supervision.

One Anishinaabe name for the river is Wa-nant-git-che-ang, "circuitous river". Alexander Macdonell and John Graves Simcoe travelled down the length of the river in October 1793, the former recording in his diary that it was then known as the Matchetache, a term that survives in the name of Matchedash Bay.

== See also ==
- List of Ontario rivers
