= Black River (Severn River tributary) =

- Location of the mouth of the Black River in southern Ontario

Location
- Country: Canada
- Province: Ontario
- Region: Central Ontario

Physical characteristics
- Source: Hosiery Lake
  - location: Algonquin Highlands, Haliburton County
  - coordinates: 45°15′33″N 78°42′52″W
  - elevation: 424 m (1,391 ft)
- Mouth: Severn River
  - location: Ramara, Simcoe County
  - coordinates: 44°45′08″N 79°18′41″W
  - elevation: 219 m (719 ft)

Basin features
- River system: Great Lakes Basin
- Tributaries
  - left: Head River

The Black River is a river in Simcoe County, the District Municipality of Muskoka, the City of Kawartha Lakes, and Haliburton County in Central Ontario, Canada. It is part of the Great Lakes Basin, and is a right tributary of the Severn River.

== Course ==
The river begins at Hosiery Lake and flows southwest to Raven Lake, then passes under Ontario Highway 35 and into the municipality of Lake of Bays, District Municipality of Muskoka. It continues southwest into Minden Hills, Haliburton County, then back into Muskoka District in the municipality of Bracebridge, passes under Ontario Highway 118 and flows by the community of Vankoughnet, and enters the city of Kawartha Lakes. The river turns west, flows over the Ragged Rapids, exits Kawartha Lakes, briefly forms the border between Simcoe County and Muskoka District, flows through the Big Eddy, then reaches the community of Cooper's Falls in the municipality of Ramara, Simcoe County. It turns south, then heads west, takes in the left tributary Head River, turns north, and reaches its mouth at the Severn River's easternmost outflow from the latter river's source at Lake Couchiching. The Severn River flows to Lake Huron.

== History ==
It is a common misconception that the Black River flows into Lake Couchiching. This was a problem for lumbermen in the 1860s, who established the Rama Timber Transport Company, to move logs from the Black River to Lake Couchiching.

== Tributaries ==
- St. John Creek (left)
- Head River (left)
- Riley Creek (right)
- Montgomery Creek (left)
- Anson Creek (left)
- Andrews Creek (left)
- Cache Creek (left)
- Ketch Creek (left)
- Clear Creek (right)
- Cinder Creek (left)
- South Jean Creek (left)
- Orillia Creek (right)
- Horse Creek (left)

== See also ==
- List of rivers of Ontario

== Sources ==
- Map 3 (PDF) (Map). 1 : 700,000. Official road map of Ontario. Ministry of Transportation of Ontario. 2014.
- Restructured municipalities - Ontario map #4 (Map). Restructuring Maps of Ontario. Ontario Ministry of Municipal Affairs and Housing. 2006. Archived from the original on 2014-04-10.
- Restructured municipalities - Ontario map #5 (Map). Restructuring Maps of Ontario. Ontario Ministry of Municipal Affairs and Housing. 2006. Archived from the original on 2020-05-11.
- Restructured municipalities - Ontario map #6 (Map). Restructuring Maps of Ontario. Ontario Ministry of Municipal Affairs and Housing. 2006. Archived from the original on 2021-02-24.
