= 2010–2017 Toronto serial homicides =

Murders of eight men in Canada

Between 2010 and 2017, a total of eight men disappeared from the neighbourhood of Church and Wellesley, the LGBTQIA+ village of Toronto, Ontario, Canada. The investigation into the disappearances, taken up by two successive police task forces, eventually led to Bruce McArthur, a 66-year-old self-employed Toronto landscaper, whom they then arrested on January 18, 2018. On January 29, 2019, McArthur pleaded guilty to eight counts of first-degree murder in Ontario Superior Court and was subsequently sentenced to life imprisonment with no eligibility for parole for twenty-five years. McArthur is the most prolific known serial killer to have been active in Toronto, and the oldest known serial killer in Canada.

The criminal investigation of McArthur became the largest ever conducted by the Toronto Police Service (TPS) and also called on the resources of the Ontario Provincial Police (OPP), Royal Canadian Mounted Police (RCMP) and other police and forensic services. Criticisms of the TPS's handling of the initial missing persons investigations led to several internal reviews, an external review called by the civilian Toronto Police Services Board (TPSB) and the formation of a dedicated missing persons unit.

In April 2021, the external review commissioned by the TPSB — known as the Independent Civilian Review into Missing Person Investigations — delivered its final report. The Review found systemic discrimination by the TPS in its investigations and concluded "the Service’s practices, if not culture and structure, prevented it from most effectively investigating the disappearances of these missing men” and made 151 recommendations for change. Interim TPS Chief James Ramer apologized for the "inexcusable" investigative shortcomings and agreed to implement all of the recommendations.

== Perpetrator ==
Bruce McArthur
- Born: Thomas Donald Bruce McArthur; October 8, 1951 (age 75); Lindsay, Ontario, Canada
- Education: Fenelon Falls Secondary School
- Occupation: Landscaper
- Status: Incarcerated
- Motive: Unknown
- Convictions: First-degree murder (8 counts); January 29, 2019
- Penalty: Life imprisonment

Details
- Victims: 8
- Span of crimes: 2010–2017
- Country: Canada
- Locations: Church and Wellesley, Thorncliffe Park (Toronto)
- Date apprehended: January 18, 2018
- Imprisoned at: Millhaven Institution

=== Early life ===
Thomas Donald Bruce McArthur, or Bruce McArthur, was born on October 8, 1951, in Lindsay, Ontario, and was raised on a farm in Argyle, in the Kawartha Lakes region. In addition to raising McArthur and his sister, his parents fostered troubled children from nearby Toronto, often with six to ten in their care at any given time, and reportedly had a good reputation in the area.

McArthur's mother was Irish Catholic and his father a Scottish Presbyterian; both were devout, causing religious arguments in which McArthur supported his mother. This led to derision from his father, who McArthur suggested in retrospect may have sensed his homosexuality. McArthur had trouble accepting his sexual orientation, which would have been seen as abnormal in rural Ontario at that time.

In primary school, a classmate recalled that McArthur did not fit in with other students. For his secondary education, McArthur was bused to nearby Fenelon Falls Secondary School, where he met and began dating Janice Campbell, both graduating in 1970. McArthur later graduated from a program in general business and married Campbell when he was aged 23.

=== Married life ===
Around 1973, McArthur began working at an Eaton's department store in downtown Toronto as a buyer's assistant. He left this employment in 1978 and began working as a travelling salesman for McGregor Socks, soliciting department stores to carry his merchandise. McArthur later worked as a merchandising representative for Stanfield's, a garment company.

In the mid-1970s, McArthur's father was diagnosed with a brain tumour and was sent to a nursing home. McArthur became disappointed when his mother took interest in another man, and grew much closer to his father at this time. His mother died of cancer in 1978 and his father died in 1981.

In 1979, McArthur and his wife moved into a house on Ormond Drive in Oshawa; by 1981 they had a daughter, Melanie, and a son, Todd. In 1986, the family bought a home on Cartref Avenue in Oshawa. McArthur became very active in his church, keeping himself busy to avoid examining his homosexual feelings.

McArthur began having affairs with men in the early 1990s. He eventually came out to his wife, but they continued living together. Sometime after 1993, McArthur's employment in the clothing trade came to an end. The couple faced financial difficulty, in part due to legal issues connected to their then-teenaged son, Todd, who had been prosecuted for making obscene phone calls to women. The couple mortgaged their home in 1997 and declared bankruptcy in 1999.

McArthur separated from his wife in 1997 and moved to Toronto, as there was only a small gay community in Oshawa at that time. He frequented the bars of Church and Wellesley, Toronto's gay village, and moved into an apartment on Don Mills Road while pursuing a four-year relationship with another man. When they broke up and his divorce was being finalized, McArthur saw a psychiatrist and was prescribed Prozac for several months. At about this time he began his career as a landscaper.

=== Halloween assault ===
Just after noon on October 31, 2001, McArthur followed actor and model Mark Henderson into his apartment after being invited inside to see his Halloween costume. McArthur struck Henderson several times from behind with an iron pipe that he often carried. Henderson fought back before losing consciousness. After waking he called 9-1-1 then was taken to St. Michael's Hospital, where he needed several stitches on the back of his head and his fingers, as well as six weeks of physiotherapy.

McArthur turned himself in after the incident, claiming not to remember the attack on Henderson. He pleaded guilty to charges of assault with a weapon and assault causing bodily harm, and received a conditional sentence of 729 days (two years less a day) on April 11, 2003. A further charge of carrying a concealed weapon was withdrawn at the time. The Crown had earlier believed jail time was warranted but agreed to conditional sentence after psychiatric and pre-sentencing reports suggested McArthur was a low risk to reoffend. Henderson was traumatized by the incident, and did not provide a victim impact statement for the sentencing. There were also concerns that McArthur's behaviour may have been due to the combination of his anti-seizure medication with amyl nitrite, (Note: The recreational drugs commonly called "poppers" are often referred to in sources, including in court documents, as "amyl nitrate". While this is a commonly used name for the drug, it is not the correct chemical nomenclature. Poppers comprise a chemical class called alkyl nitrites, of which amyl nitrite was the first to be widely used as a recreational drug.) a muscle relaxant which is sometimes taken by gay men recreationally before sex.

McArthur avoided incarceration, spending the first year of his sentence under house arrest, followed by a six-month curfew and three years of probation. During the sentence, he was barred from Church and Wellesley except for work and medical appointments, had to stay at least 10 metres (33 ft) from Henderson's home or workplace, and could not spend time with male prostitutes. McArthur was forbidden to possess firearms for ten years; was not to purchase, possess or consume drugs without a medical prescription; and was specifically barred from possessing amyl nitrite. He also had to submit his DNA to a database and was compelled to undertake psychological and psychiatric counselling, including anger management. A defence lawyer found the list of conditions uncommon and suggested that the judge was concerned that McArthur still posed a danger. A retired detective noted that parole conditions at the time were unenforceable, were not publicized, and that parole violators were caught only if they attracted police attention.

In 2014, McArthur was granted a record suspension on the 2003 conviction, which was subsequently expunged from his record and would not have appeared in criminal background checks. Most records and exhibits pertaining to the case were destroyed in 2010, in compliance with Toronto Police Service (TPS) retention policy. The only surviving documents were the transcripts of the guilty plea and sentencing hearing, the psychiatric report and presentencing report ordered during the trial, and pictures of Henderson's injuries and McArthur's weapon.

=== Additional background ===
In 2002, while the assault case was still pending, McArthur registered with Recon, a gay fetish dating website for men into BDSM. McArthur's profile noted his interest in submissive men. He was also active on numerous gay dating websites including Silverdaddies, Manjam, Grindr, Bear411, BearForest, Scruff, DaddyHunt, Squirt and Growlr. McArthur joined Facebook in 2011 and catalogued his participation in local nightlife, with younger men of South Asian or Middle Eastern descent in several photos. By this time McArthur had reestablished himself in Toronto's gay community and was a regular at gay bars. By the late 2000s he was living in a 19th-floor apartment in Thorncliffe Park, about 5 kilometres (3 mi) northeast of Church and Wellesley.

McArthur's banishment from Church and Wellesley over the 2001 assault remained well known, and he had developed a reputation for BDSM and rough sex. In 2011, he told an acquaintance named Robert James about an incident in which he had reacted violently after being asked to leave a coffeehouse. James decided to heed advice to stay away from McArthur, explaining that he had heard disturbing stories about him. According to James, McArthur turned red and screamed about "f---ing f---ots [sic] telling stories about me!" and, "You're just like the rest of them, you think I'm crazy." A. J. Khan, a Toronto restaurant owner, recalled questioning McArthur in 2013 when he came in alone instead of with his boyfriend. McArthur said his boyfriend was on vacation, and when Khan noted he had seen the man the previous day, he angrily left and never returned.

McArthur's landscaping business operated under the name Artistic Designs. A colleague who installed water features on three of his projects recalled that McArthur was always accompanied by an older white man, who appeared to be romantically involved with him, and a day labourer, usually of Southeast Asian or Middle Eastern descent. Most of McArthur's clients were wealthy elderly women who found him charming, and he had built a client base through personal recommendations. During the off-season, he portrayed Santa Claus at Agincourt Mall and made floral gifts for charities.

McArthur's separation from his wife was initially heated, though they later reconciled. His son was reported to have difficulty accepting his father's sexuality. In 2014, after Todd was sentenced to fourteen months in jail for making multiple obscene phone calls, he was released on bail and ordered to live with his father and assist with his landscaping business. A former friend of Todd's visited one night and discovered the wall of McArthur's bathroom was decorated with photos of naked "East Indian" men. Todd told him that they were men whom his father knew. McArthur did not hide the fact, laughing over it at breakfast.

== Missing persons investigations ==
=== Project Houston ===
In November 2012, the TPS launched a task force, dubbed "Project Houston", into the September 6, 2010 disappearance of Skandaraj "Skanda" Navaratnam, believing that he had been murdered. The investigation was launched after a user posted on the cannibal web forum Zambian Meat that he had killed and eaten a man in Toronto. Police briefly investigated a possible link between Navaratnam and convicted murderer Luka Magnotta, but this lead was eventually abandoned for lack of evidence.

By June 2013, Project Houston had identified two other missing persons cases linked by geography and lifestyle: Abdulbasir "Basir" Faizi and Majeed "Hamid" Kayhan. Like Navaratnam, both men were middle-aged South Asian immigrants who disappeared from Church and Wellesley between 2010 and 2012. An anonymous tip linking McArthur to Navaratnam and Kayhan led police to interview him on November 11, 2013. McArthur stated that he regularly interacted with Navaratnam at a gay bar, but denied being in a relationship with him. He also admitted to employing Kayhan, with whom he had broken off a sexual relationship. Project Houston concluded with no evidence to link the disappearances, that a crime had been committed or to identify a suspect. According to a 2016 case summary, there was still nothing to explain what had happened to the three men.

=== Missing Rainbow Community ===
On June 26, 2017, one day after attending Pride Toronto, Andrew Kinsman disappeared near his residence on Winchester Street in Cabbagetown. On the evening of June 28, several friends gained access to Kinsman's apartment. They found no sign of disturbance, though his 17-year-old cat was out of food and water. Noting that Kinsman's life was stable and that he would never leave without notifying anyone or taking his cat and prescription medicine, the friends reported the disappearance to the TPS the following day. Kinsman was active on social media, but investigators found his cell phone was turned off the day he disappeared.

This image of missing persons caused some to suspect a serial killer.

At the end of July 2017, the TPS created a new task force, Project Prism, to investigate the disappearances of Kinsman and another man, Selim Esen, and to look for any links with the unsolved disappearances investigated under Project Houston. Greg Downer, a friend and colleague of Kinsman's, organized a community safety meeting on August 1 in which police gave an overview of the task force. Realizing the difficulty police faced with judicial authorizations for data from servers located outside Canada, which caused crucial delays in the missing persons investigations, Downer appealed to dating apps to provide an option for users to consent to have their data released to police if they went missing. Safety hotlines were also set up for those reluctant to speak to police.

Fears of a serial killer stalking Church and Wellesley grew on November 29 when the body of Tess Richey was found by her mother in an alleyway four days after she was reported missing. The following day, police announced that the body of Alloura Wells, a homeless transgender woman, had been identified, her body having been discovered in a Rosedale ravine in August. Because of fears in the community, TPS Chief Mark Saunders held an unprecedented December 8 news conference on the three separate investigations. Although the cases occurred in close proximity, the TPS did not believe they were related and Saunders said they had no evidence of a serial killer.

=== Project Prism ===
Project Prism was overseen by Detective Sergeant Michael Richmond and led by Detective Sergeant Hank Idsinga, who had served on the homicide squad for over thirteen years and had been assigned to Project Houston for six months. The task force also included an officer from the sex crimes unit and six officers from Police 51 Division, three of whom had been members of Project Houston. The investigation was difficult because of the lifestyle of the subjects, who used dating apps and frequently met strangers.

Kinsman's disappearance was central to the creation of Project Prism because of a lead obtained at the end of July. According to an agreed statement of facts read in court, police found "Bruce" on Kinsman's calendar for June 26 – the same day Kinsman was last seen. Surveillance video outside Kinsman's residence showed a person matching his appearance approach a red vehicle. The video did not show a licence plate or a clear picture of the driver, but chrome siding identified it as a 2004 Dodge Caravan. There were more than 6,000 similar models in Toronto, but only five were registered to someone named Bruce; of those the only 2004 model belonged to McArthur. By late August or September 2017, police matched the van from surveillance video of McArthur's apartment, but it was no longer at his residence.

Redacted warrants and police documents, partially released by a judge in mid-2018, revealed that in August and September investigators had obtained production orders compelling the release of McArthur's data from Google, Rogers Wireless, Bell Canada, Telus, Royal Bank of Canada and Manulife Bank of Canada. Around September, tracking warrants had been obtained for McArthur's vehicles and phones. In October, further orders were granted for information from Yahoo!, Air Canada, additional banks and Pink Triangle Press, an LGBT publisher.

On October 3, plainclothes officers visited at Dom's Auto Parts in Courtice, Ontario, 70 kilometres (43 mi) northeast of Toronto, where owner Dominic Vetere confirmed he had purchased McArthur's Caravan on September 16. Police found it intact and had it towed away, also copying surveillance video of McArthur visiting the shop. Vetere said that officers later told him that they had found trace amounts of blood in the vehicle. This blood was identified as Kinsman's.

Court documents show that, in November, cadaver dogs were brought to a Mallory Crescent residence in the Leaside neighbourhood of Toronto. McArthur had an arrangement to tend to the owners' yard in exchange for storage space in their garage. The dogs did not indicate any human remains. A camera was installed to monitor the garage. Police also obtained a log of McArthur's key fob for his apartment. With this and a tracking warrant for his cellphone, they built a timeline of the day Kinsman went missing. DNA evidence from the Caravan matched Kinsman and Esen, which allowed investigators to obtain a general warrant for McArthur's apartment on December 4. Police covertly entered his residence and cloned his computer's hard drive.

In a December 8 news conference, investigators stated they had completed 62 witness interviews, 28 judicial authorizations and assigned 308 actions, of which 225 had been completed. Police had also conducted searches, utilizing resources from the mounted and canine units; on one occasion a drone was used. They said that they had no evidence to link the disappearances.

The investigation picked up in January 2018, when Idsinga noted they had many 15-hour days and a 72-hour stretch of intensive investigation in mid-January. On January 17, two pieces of evidence came to light directly connecting McArthur to Esen and Kinsman. A partial download from his computer, which was going through forensic analysis of deleted files, yielded post-mortem photos of the victims. Round-the-clock surveillance was put on McArthur, with instructions that he should be immediately arrested if observed "alone with anyone".

== Arrest ==
Police surveilling McArthur decided to apprehend him shortly after they saw a young man enter his Thorncliffe Park apartment on January 18, believing his life was at risk. A source told CTV News that the officers found the young man restrained on a bed when they entered the apartment. Referred to in court as "John", the man had met McArthur through Growlr and had met him for sex several times. Prior to the police intervention, "John" had agreed to be handcuffed to McArthur's steel bedframe; McArthur put a black bag over his head and tried to tape his mouth shut before the rescue.

Following McArthur's arrest, police seized electronic devices from his apartment, including five cellphones, five computers, three digital cameras and about a dozen USB flash drives. Evidence found on these devices prompted investigators to charge him with two counts of first-degree murder in the presumed deaths of Kinsman and Esen. Their bodies had not been found, but police said that they had a "pretty good idea" of how they died. Idsinga was satisfied that there was enough evidence for murder convictions even without the bodies.

== Homicide investigation ==
At the time of McArthur's arrest, Idsinga said that police believed he was responsible for the deaths of other men and were most concerned with identifying these victims. Doing so included coordinating with other police services, tracing McArthur's whereabouts and his online activity.

By the end of January, Idsinga described the ongoing case as unprecedented, with hundreds of officers involved and thirty properties being searched. The Ontario Provincial Police (OPP), the Ontario Forensic Pathology Service (OFPS) and the Centre of Forensic Sciences (CFS) aided the searches of McArthur's apartment and the Leaside property. Additional charges were laid and at the end of February, the investigation was expanded to outstanding murder cases, hundreds of missing-persons cases and sudden death occurrences, coordinating with other Canadian and international forces.

=== Apartment and Leaside home ===
On January 18, police executed search warrants at five properties associated with McArthur: four in Toronto and a 9-acre (3.6 ha) property about 200 kilometres (120 mi) northeast in Madoc, Ontario. The Madoc property and a home on Conlins Road were residences belonging to Roger Horan, a landscaper and long-time friend of McArthur. Another property searched was the condominium of McArthur's former boyfriend on Concorde Place. These three properties were released back to their owners by January 23. Of greater concern to investigators were McArthur's high-rise apartment in Thorncliffe Park and the Mallory Crescent residence in Leaside.

The owners of the Leaside residence were barred from their home to allow a forensic search. The search was extended to an adjacent ravine, aided by cadaver dogs and members of the heavy urban search and rescue team. Cadaver dogs took a "strong interest" in large planter boxes on January 19. The planters had frozen to the ground, requiring heaters to thaw them. On January 29, police announced that they had found the dismembered skeletal remains of at least three people in two of the twelve planters. Although the remains had not been identified, police had gathered enough evidence to charge McArthur with three additional counts of first-degree murder in the presumed deaths of Majeed Kayhan, a Project Houston subject; Soroush Mahmudi, who disappeared in 2015; and Dean Lisowick, a homeless man who was never reported missing.

On February 8, police announced that they had found the remains of three more people from the Leaside residence, and that one of the six sets of remains belonged to Kinsman, identified through fingerprints. Additional planters were seized from across the city, including one from the Danforth neighbourhood and two properties in North Rosedale. A forensic pathologist was expected to take at least ten days to excavate for remains at the Leaside residence by hand. Forensic anthropologist Kathy Gruspier, who arrived to oversee the excavation, did not find any sign of soil disturbance by previous digging. Excavation of two sewage lines at the home was conducted on February 13, and a section of one line was removed for testing.

The investigation had a continuous presence at the Leaside residence, often described as "ground zero", and police established a command post on the property. On February 10–11 the search was completed and it was released to its owners after more than three weeks. The owners requested that police keep crime scene tape up around the yard to deter journalists by whom they were feeling increasingly harassed.

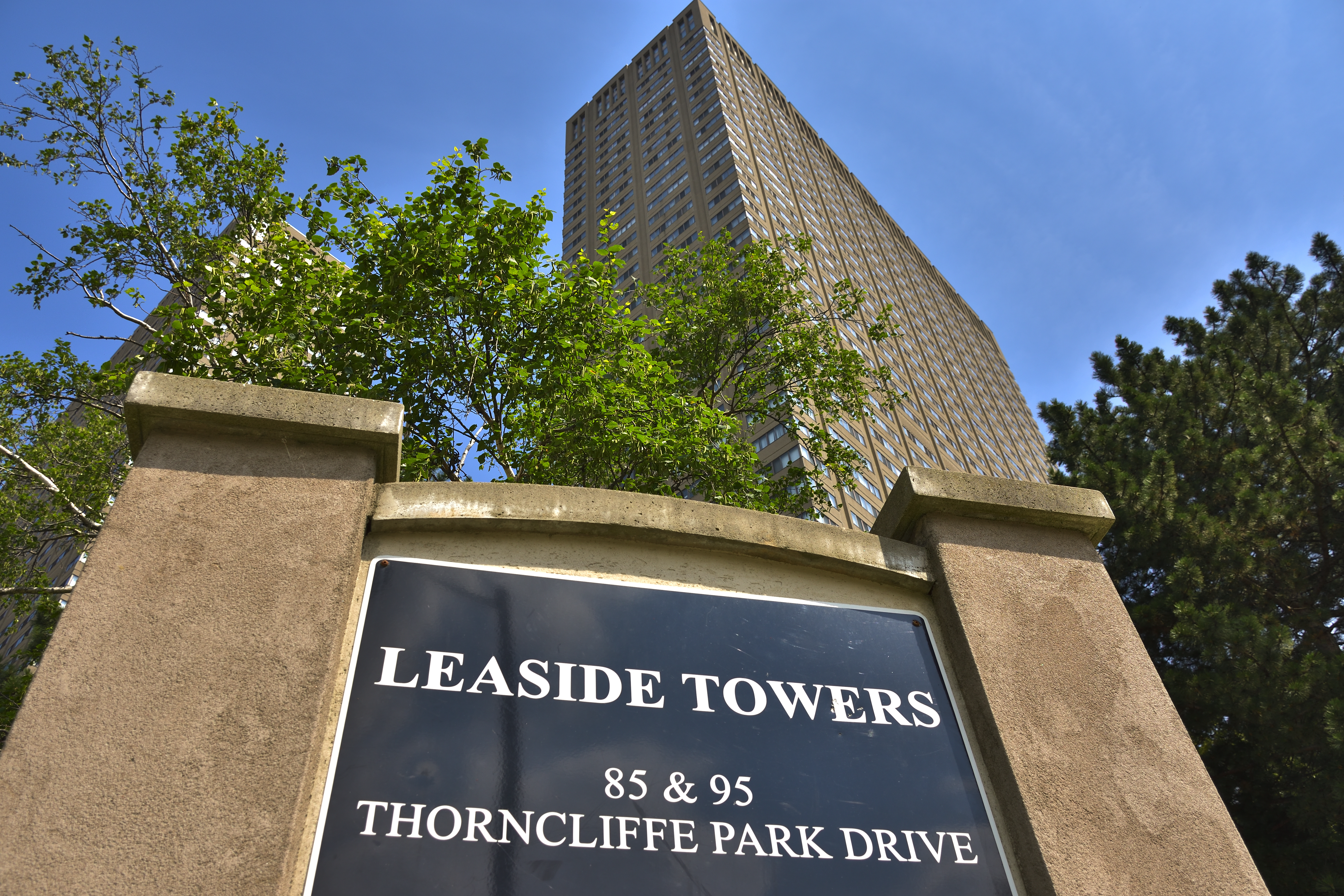
Police believe that some of the murders took place at McArthur's apartment, where they conducted a four-month forensic search.

Forensic investigators spent hundreds of hours searching every inch of McArthur's apartment, where Idsinga suspected some of the murders occurred. It took them several weeks before searching McArthur's bedroom, where they expected to find the bulk of their evidence. The search concluded on May 11, having occupied ten forensic officers for nearly four months. They took more than 18,000 photographs and collected over 1,800 items. Idsinga noted the thoroughness required as the first murder was believed to have occurred eight years previously. The searches of the Leaside residence and McArthur's apartment made up the largest forensic investigation conducted by the TPS.

On February 23, McArthur was charged with a sixth count of first-degree murder in the death of Skandaraj Navaratnam, a subject of Project Houston. His remains and those of Mahmudi were identified through dental records, and had been recovered from planters at the Leaside residence.

On March 5, the TPS held a press conference and released a photo of an unidentified deceased man alleged to be another of McArthur's victims. Police later received over 500 tips regarding the photo and were checking on 22 potential identities. They also announced that a seventh set of remains had been recovered from the Leaside planters. Michael Pollanen, Ontario's chief forensic pathologist, said his organization had never before been involved in an investigation with such scope, drawing on the skills of each member for many unique challenges, such as scientific issues related to decomposition and post-mortem dismemberment.

On April 11, McArthur was charged with a seventh count of first-degree murder in the death of Abdulbasir Faizi. He was, at this point, charged with the deaths of all five men from the Project Houston and Project Prism investigations. The charge came as Faizi's remains were identified from the Leaside planters, along with those of Esen and Lisowick. Investigators had finished searching the Leaside planters, from which the remains of all but Kayhan had been identified; they had one set of unidentified remains. They had also searched eight additional planters from elsewhere in the city, which had contained no human remains.

On April 16, McArthur was charged with an eighth count of first-degree murder in the death of Kirushna Kumar Kanagaratnam, whose remains were the seventh set identified from the Leaside planters. Police said his name had not come from the many tips generated by the release of his post-mortem photograph but that he had been identified with help from an undisclosed international agency. Kanagaratnam was a Tamil asylum-seeker who was under a deportation order and had not been reported missing. Police said they would look into why his name was not on a list of missing persons. He had last had contact with his family in August 2015, and police believed that he had been killed between September 3 and December 14, 2015.

=== Expanded investigation ===
The scope of the investigation was expanded at the end of February 2018, looking at outstanding murder cases, hundreds of missing-persons cases and sudden death occurrences and coordinating with other Canadian and international forces. Police had received tips from around the world, including countries where McArthur had vacationed. Idsinga said that the investigation would take years.

A police source told the National Post that McArthur had covered his tracks, using aliases online, using payphones instead of cellphones and avoiding areas with surveillance cameras. The source suggested that McArthur had targeted vulnerable men who did not have a fixed address or had not told their families that they were gay.

Detective-Sergeant Stacy Gallant of the TPS homicide squad's cold case unit said that active crime scenes of the investigation took precedence over revisiting cold cases. Each of 600 cold cases was being looked at for consideration of further attention. They drew up a list of fifteen homicide cold cases linked to the gay village, and fitting the general profile of the victims identified thus far. Investigators began reviewing these cases, dating between 1975 and 1997, for a possible connection to McArthur. By mid-July, forensic testing related to the cold cases was underway. The cold cases include some of a series of brutal murders in the gay village between 1975 and 1978, when McArthur would have been 23–26 years old and working just a few blocks south. The victims of these crimes, all gay men, were found in their homes, naked, tied to beds, and stabbed or beaten to death in a manner described as "overkill". In October 2018, homicide detective David Dickinson said that they had not yet found any links between McArthur and the cold cases.

Investigators had planned to return to the thirty properties associated with McArthur in April or May, when the frozen ground had thawed, allowing cadaver dogs to operate with greater accuracy. Idsinga said he was particularly interested in excavating at three properties. The excavations included a return visit to the Leaside residence, where remains had been found. Additional tip-offs caused the number of properties to be searched grow to 75 then 100, some of them outside the city. A team of seven cadaver dogs, some on loan from other police forces in the Greater Toronto Area, were searching the properties by the second week of May. These searches had concluded by the first week of June. Follow-up investigations had then considered whether additional searches would be required.

Between July 4 and 13, twenty police investigators conducted excavations in the forested ravine behind the Leaside property. They began sifting through a large compost pile, then proceeded with the guidance of trained dogs and a forensic anthropologist. They collected human remains almost every day of this search. On July 20, it was announced that the remains belonged to Kayhan, and that the remains of all of McArthur's alleged victims had been identified. Idsinga said that they had no evidence suggesting McArthur was connected to any other deaths, though the investigation into cold cases was continuing.

Waterloo Regional Police contacted Ontario's serial predator crime investigations coordinator to inquire about McArthur in the November 2002 disappearance of David MacDermott from downtown Kitchener. Jon Riley of Meaford is another possible victim; he had gone to Toronto to find work in landscaping, planning to stay in a shelter at Church and Wellesley, and disappeared in May 2013.

== Victims ==
Five victims were noted by investigators for similarities: middle-aged, bearded, patrons of The Black Eagle bar and self-identified as "bears" (gay men with overtly masculine traits). They had also disappeared over holiday weekends: Navaratnam at Labour Day, Faizi after Christmas, Kayhan during Thanksgiving, Esen on Easter and Kinsman after Toronto Pride. During McArthur's sentencing hearing, prosecutors said that the eight victims had ties to Church and Wellesley and a "social life" in that community, physical similarities which usually included facial hair or a beard, and six were from South Asia or the Middle East. Several of the deceased had characteristics that made them more easily victimized or the crimes easier to conceal, such as moving between temporary residences or keeping aspects of their lives secret.

Known victims of McArthur
| Name | Age | Last seen | | Reported missing | Charges laid | Notes |
| Name | Age | date | location | Reported missing | Charges laid | Notes |
|---|---|---|---|---|---|---|
| Abdulbasir "Basir" Faizi | 42 | Dec 28, 2010 | gay village | Dec 29, 2010 | Apr 11, 2018 | Afghan immigrant leading a double life |
| Majeed "Hamid" Kayhan | 58 | Oct 18, 2012 | gay village | Oct 25, 2012 | Jan 29, 2018 | Afghan immigrant leading a double life |
| Skandaraj "Skanda" Navaratnam | 40 | Sep 6, 2010 | gay village | Sep 10 or 11, 2010 | Feb 23, 2018 | Sri Lankan Tamil refugee with no family in Canada; sexual and employment ties to McArthur |
| Soroush Mahmudi | 50 | Aug 14, 2015 | South Cedarbrae | Aug 2015 | Jan 29, 2018 | refugee from Iran |
| Andrew Kinsman | 49 | Jun 26, 2017 | Cabbagetown | Jun 29, 2017 | Jan 18, 2018 | sexual and employment ties to McArthur |
| Selim Esen | 44 | Mar 20, 2017 | gay village | Apr 20, 2017 | Jan 18, 2018 | Turkish citizen with history of drug use |
| Dean Lisowick | 43–44 | Apr 21, 2016 | Scott Mission | not reported | Jan 29, 2018 | homeless, former drug user and sex worker |
| Kirushna Kumar Kanagaratnam | 37 | Aug 2015 | unknown | not reported | Apr 16, 2018 | Sri Lankan Tamil asylum-seeker under a deportation order |

All information should be properly sourced below and is accurate as of June 23, 2018. Notes are intended to briefly show commonalities, vulnerabilities and connections to McArthur.

Skandaraj "Skanda" Navaratnam (40) was last seen in the early morning of September 6, 2010, leaving Zippers, a former gay bar, with an unknown man. A friend who saw Navaratnam the day before said he was excited about having a dog; he left this pet behind at the bar when he disappeared. He was reported missing September 10 or 11, 2010. Navaratnam was romantically involved with McArthur, whom he had met in 1999. He also worked for McArthur's landscaping business, and friends said that they were still involved in 2008. Navaratnam was a Tamil refugee from Sri Lanka and had no family members in Canada.

Abdulbasir "Basir" Faizi (42) was last seen December 28, 2010, leaving his workplace in Mississauga, though banking records later placed him at Church and Wellesley. His last night out included a stop at The Black Eagle bar and the Steamworks bathhouse. Faizi was an immigrant from Afghanistan. While living in Iran, a childhood friend had cautioned him on coming out as gay, advising that he should "find God or leave." That conflict remained with Faizi, who was not out to his family. A colleague said that he had been working overtime to ensure that his two daughters got everything that they wanted for Christmas. Faizi was reported missing on December 29 to Peel Regional Police, west of Toronto. His 2002 Nissan Sentra was found abandoned on Moore Avenue, steps away from the Beltline Trail, a small ravine which is a popular cruising spot for gay men. Moore Avenue connects to Mallory Crescent and the Leaside residence where McArthur stored his landscaping equipment. On April 11, 2018, police charged McArthur with the murder of Faizi, which occurred on or about December 29, 2010.

Majeed "Hamid" Kayhan (58) was last seen on October 18, 2012, in Church and Wellesley near Yonge Street and Alexander Street. He was reported missing by his adult son on October 25. Kayhan was an immigrant from Afghanistan who fled to Canada with his wife and children in the late 1980s. Kayhan and his wife divorced in 2002 but, as the son of a Muslim cleric, he had not come out to his entire family. He had post-traumatic stress disorder from the Soviet–Afghan War and was a heavy drinker. According to a bartender, Kayhan had been active in the gay village since the mid-1990s and would stay at an apartment kept by his partner, who had also not come out to his family. Following the death of his partner, Kayhan romantically pursued McArthur whom he knew from The Black Eagle. His remains were found in a ravine behind the Leaside property, the eighth set to be identified.

Soroush Mahmudi (50) was last seen alive on August 14, 2015, by his home near Markham Road and Blakemanor Boulevard, in the South Cedarbrae neighbourhood. Mahmudi was a manufacturing plant worker who lived with his wife. Police believe that McArthur killed Mahmudi on or about August 15. He was reported missing by his wife later that month. Mahmudi had come to Canada as a refugee from Iran and did not have any family in the country until he met his wife. They moved from Barrie to Toronto to be closer to his wife's family. Police and Mahmudi's family had not connected him to Toronto's gay scene, though before his marriage he had been in a four-year relationship with a transgender woman he met in a bar in Church and Wellesley.

Andrew Kinsman (49) was last seen June 26, 2017, the day after Toronto Pride, near his Winchester Street residence in Cabbagetown, south of Church and Wellesley. He was reported missing on June 29. A friend who last saw him said that Kinsman was "happy and upbeat." He was known as a stable and responsible man, a superintendent of his building and a community volunteer. Kinsman had known McArthur for at least a decade, back to when Kinsman was a bartender at The Black Eagle. He was seen carrying bags of debris on one of McArthur's landscaping projects in 2011 and had been in a sexual relationship with McArthur for some time.

Selim Esen (44) was last definitively seen on March 20, 2017, near Yonge Street and Bloor Street, just west of Church and Wellesley, though there have been reports that he was seen as late as April 14 near Bloor Street and Ted Rogers Way. He was reported missing by a friend on April 20. Police initially described Esen as a man of no fixed address who often pulled a wheeled suitcase. A friend disputed this, saying that Esen was in an "unhealthy relationship" and would at times stay with friends. Esen was a Turkish national who had first come to Canada to be with a partner that he had met in Turkey. According to the friend, he struggled with addiction but was getting control of his problem and had completed a certificate course in peer counselling from St. Stephen's community house just before he disappeared. McArthur was also a client of St. Stephen's and very trusted within the community support organization. He was killed by McArthur on or about April 16, 2017.

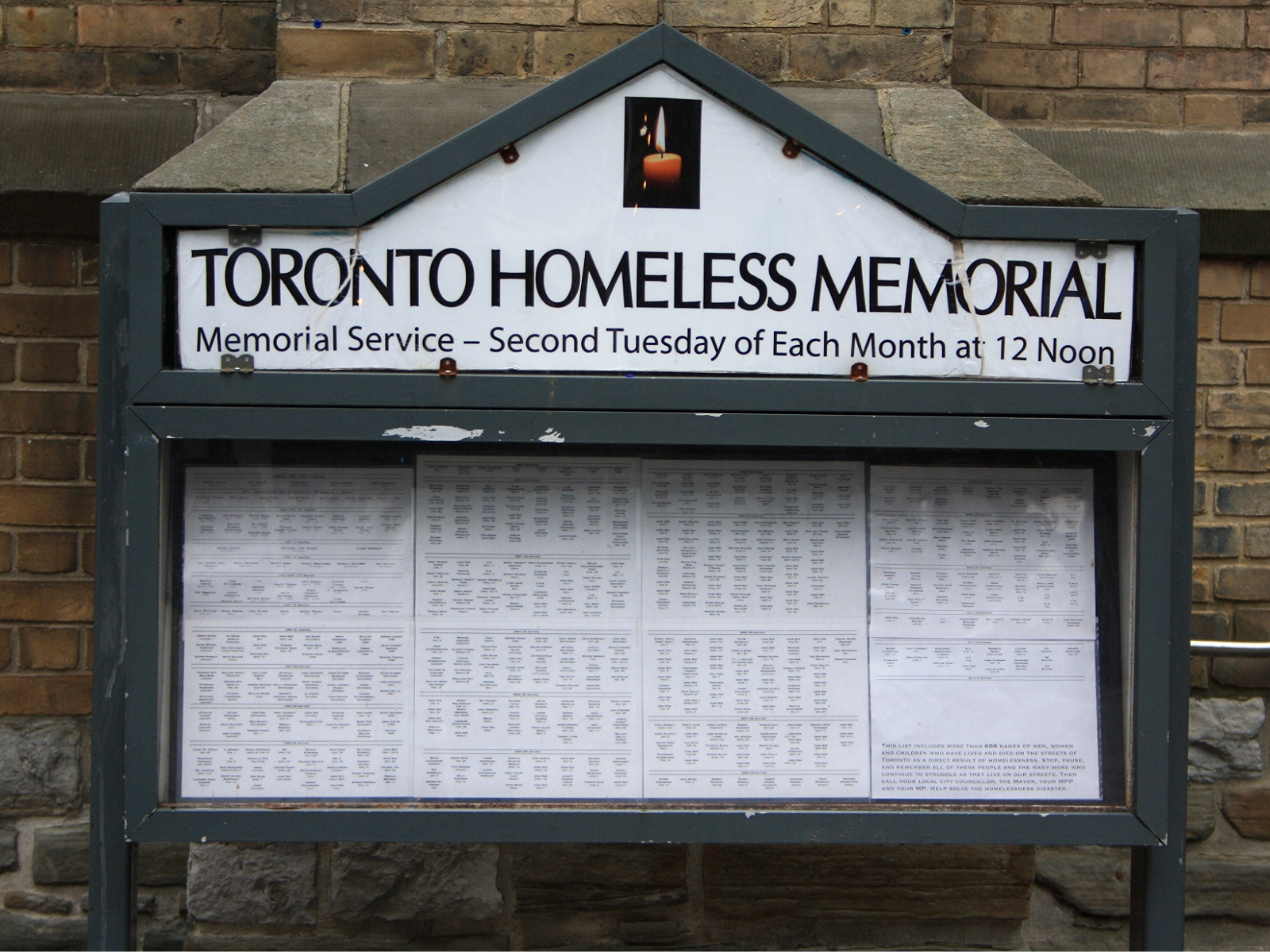
Dean Lisowick's name was added to the Toronto Homeless Memorial at Church of the Holy Trinity in February 2018.

Dean Lisowick (43 or 44) was not reported missing. He was a resident of Toronto's shelter system. Lisowick had periodically stayed at The Scott Mission on Spadina Avenue since 2003 and was last recorded there on April 21, 2016. He had faced struggles, including issues with addiction, but was remembered as being very respectful. Lisowick was trying to work more, as a cleaner or labourer, having previously worked as a prostitute. He was killed by McArthur on or about April 23, 2016.

Kirushna Kumar Kanagaratnam (37) last had contact with his family in August 2015. He was not reported missing. He was one of 492 Tamil refugees from Sri Lanka who had arrived in Canada on the MV Sun Sea in August 2010. When his deportation order was given, Kanagaratnam went into hiding in the Tamil community in Ontario and worked as a cleaner and mover. McArthur killed him on or about January 6, 2016.

Following the extensive coroner and pathology examinations, after Crown and defence lawyers had information needed for trial, the victims' remains were released to their families. A memorial for Kinsman was held in September, and Mahmudi and Esen's funerals were held in mid-October. Lisowick's remains were laid to rest in late October.

== Legal proceedings ==
In January 2018, a publication ban was ordered on court proceedings, limiting what could be reported in the media. McArthur was detained at the Toronto South Detention Centre. The Toronto Star reported on March 19, 2018, that McArthur was being held "in segregation and under constant suicide watch". As of November 5, 2018, McArthur remained held at Toronto South. He made his first court appearance on January 19, 2018, represented by lawyer Marianne Salih. He made another brief courtroom appearance on January 29, and subsequently attended via video link, represented by W. Calvin Rosemond of the legal defence firm of Edward H. Royle & Partners.

Rosemond noted at a February 14, 2018, hearing that it was McArthur's third court appearance without disclosure. Crown attorney Mike Cantlon said his office received disclosure from police on February 13, and was in the process of vetting and screening it. In mid-March the same year, Cantlon said one package of disclosure had been made to McArthur's lawyers, with more to be expected in the following weeks, some in excess of 10,000 pages owing to the case's complexity. On April 25, Cantlon said more evidence would be turned over to the defence before the next scheduled court date, May 23, at which time defence counsel said that they were continuing to receive disclosure. On June 22, the Crown stated that it had disclosed all evidence to the defence.

A judicial pre-trial was scheduled for June 20, 2018. The closed-door meeting with the Crown and defence lawyers and a judge was to address issues such as resolving the case without a trial (such as by entering a guilty plea), trial length, and procedural and evidentiary issues. Daniel Lerner, a Toronto defence lawyer and former Crown prosecutor, suggested that the Crown should consider severing the charges. Lerner noted that a long and complicated trial could put a burden on the jury and create a risk of mistrial. Kevin Bryan, a former detective with York Regional Police's forensics unit, considered the amount of evidence to be catalogued and disclosed, and believed a trial was "years away".

Several media outlets had applied for the release of the psychiatric and presentencing reports from McArthur's 2003 assault conviction. James Miglin, an attorney for McArthur, argued that this could risk his fair trial rights, but Justice Leslie Chaplin felt the reports were generally positive toward McArthur and released them on June 27, 2018. Chaplin also allowed the media to view, but not publish, photographs of the victim's injuries and the weapon used, citing fair trial rights and the victim's privacy.

In court on October 5, 2018, Cantlon said that "negotiations and discussions are ongoing". Represented by James Miglin, McArthur appeared in court in person on October 22, and waived his right to a preliminary hearing, not contesting whether the evidence was sufficient for the charges to be committed to trial. McArthur was ordered to be tried for eight counts of first-degree murder. On November 5, he first appeared at the Superior Court of Justice before Justice John McMahon, who noted a 2016 Supreme Court of Canada ruling, by which the trial should conclude before August 2020. Following a judicial pretrial on November 30, McArthur appeared in court and was told that his trial would begin on January 6, 2020, and was likely to last three to four months.

On January 28, 2019, TPS announced an anticipated "significant development" in McArthur's case the following day. People queued outside the courthouse from 6 am, following a major snowstorm, and the hearing was moved to the largest available courtroom. On January 29, before Justice John McMahon, McArthur pleaded guilty to each of the eight first-degree murder charges that he was facing, ending the possibility of any trial.

Reading from an agreed statement of fact, Cantlon divulged details of the killings, which took place in Toronto between 2010 and 2017. Each murder was either premeditated or involved other crimes which qualified them as first-degree: six were "sexual in nature" and five included confinement. McArthur kept trophies from his victims including jewellery and a notebook. DNA from four of the victims had been found in McArthur's van. Cantlon then outlined McArthur's "post-offence rituals". McArthur had hundreds of post-mortem digital photographs of his victims, which were recovered forensically after he tried to delete them. He took staged post-mortem photographs, typically with ropes around their necks or with them nude in a fur coat or hat; some photographs had them with their heads and beards shaved, with McArthur having kept their hair in Ziploc bags in a shed near Mount Pleasant Cemetery.

Cantlon said that McArthur "sought out and exploited [...] vulnerabilities" in his victims that made his crimes difficult to detect; that he used sex to lure them, killing many in his bedroom through "ligature strangulation". One photograph showed a rope around a victim's neck twisted with a metal bar wrapped in tape, a mechanism to control the pressure during strangulation. The bar was found in McArthur's 2017 van and contained the DNA of Kinsman and Esen.

McArthur's sentencing hearing began on February 4, 2019. A 2011 change to the criminal code permits a judge to order that parole ineligibility periods be served consecutively for offences committed after that year, which would include six of McArthur's murders. The crown asked for a 50-year parole ineligibility, citing "the enormity of McArthur's crimes", his lack of remorse (McArthur declined to address the court), the betrayals upon his victims, the effect of his crimes on the community, and how he had been a danger up to his arrest. Miglin said such a sentence would be "unduly harsh" given McArthur's age and noted he had waived a preliminary hearing and pleaded guilty, which benefited all involved in the proceedings. On February 8, Justice McMahon sentenced McArthur to life imprisonment with no parole eligibility for 25 years. McMahon described the crimes as "pure evil" and stated that McArthur showed "no evidence of remorse" and would have continued killing had he not been apprehended. Despite this, he felt that the sentence should not be one of vengeance given McArthur's age and his guilty plea. McArthur can apply for parole when he is 91, but McMahon said that it would be "highly unlikely" he would be granted parole. The Toronto Sun noted that McArthur is overweight with Type 2 diabetes and is unlikely to live that long. McArthur was hospitalized after being assaulted at Millhaven Institution.

== Controversies ==
The high-profile investigation and media coverage have drawn controversies, including accusations of indifference by the Toronto police towards the LGBTQ, racialized and homeless persons.

=== Use of the term serial killer ===
In mid-November 2017, Richmond said that there was no evidence to establish or exclude that a serial killer was responsible for the disappearances. Saunders told the community on December 8, "The evidence today tells us there's not a serial killer". Police first said that they were dealing with an alleged serial killer on January 29, 2018, confirming what some in the community had feared for years. Some questioned whether police had been taking their concerns seriously. Nicki Ward, a director of the Church-Wellesley Neighbourhood Association, asked, "Why weren't we listened to earlier? Perhaps some lives could have been saved if that was the case."

Saunders responded that police were not being "coy" about community safety, but that he had been speaking of the evidence that they had at that time. Saunders, who had been a homicide detective for nine years, was an investigator first and spoke in terms of evidence that could be presented in court. Idsinga said that police knew "something was up" with the disappearances in Project Houston, that they had hunches of a killer operating at Church and Wellesley, but that he could not say it without evidence. TPS spokesperson Meaghan Gray noted that while there were theories connecting the disappearances, there had been no evidence at that time.

James Dubro, a long-time Toronto crime journalist and past president of the Crime Writers of Canada, wrote in July 2017 that a serial killer – though not ruled out by police – was highly unlikely. Jooyoung Lee, a University of Toronto associate professor who teaches a course on serial homicides, said in November 2017 that the disappearances had the warning signs of a serial killer but that it remained unclear and that serial killers were very rare.

Sasha Reid, a University of Toronto PhD candidate specializing in statistical analysis of missing persons and sexually motivated killers, was compiling a missing-persons database when she came across the Project Houston disappearances. She noticed a pattern and concluded that a serial killer was operating in Toronto. Reid said she informed police of her findings and provided a basic criminal profile in July 2017, the month Project Prism was created. She was not contacted again by police, probably because her academic data could not be used in court. Reid's profile identified a suspect of colour in his early 30s, which excluded McArthur. Reid noted that the term serial killer was problematic as it is defined and used differently by various organizations, legal jurisdictions, researchers and the media.

Mike Arntfield, a criminologist and Western University professor, has advocated data-based approaches to augment traditional investigative work, particularly in detecting elusive criminals like serial killers. His research team developed an algorithm to perform cluster analysis on 800,000 American murders catalogued by the Murder Accountability Project, which has led to arrests in Cleveland, Chicago, and Drachten. There is no equivalent database in Canada, which lacks standardized reporting.

Arntfield had been critical of the TPS for not admitting that there was a serial killer, suggesting that they could have made an arrest sooner if they had. He made a comparison to the Seminole Heights serial killer in Tampa Bay, Florida, where police warned the public of a serial killer in November 2017. This led to 5,000 tips being reported, one of which resulted in an arrest. On October 23, 2017, Tampa's interim police chief avoided the term serial killer when three victims had been killed with the same weapon; it was only used after a fourth murder in November when police obtained surveillance video of the same suspect at two crime scenes. In comparison, the TPS said they did not have evidence of a murder or that any of the suspicious disappearances were connected until January 17, the day before McArthur's arrest. The large number of tips generated in Tampa may have been influenced by a US$100,000 reward offered at that time.

=== Allegations of racism ===
Gay activists and editorial writers have suggested that police only looked at the disappearances seriously when a white man, Andrew Kinsman, was reported missing. Idsinga denied this, noting that Project Houston was a bigger investigation. He also noted that Kinsman's disappearance in June 2017 was important to the creation of Project Prism because of evidence obtained in July, not because of race. CBC News examined hundreds of pages of partially redacted court orders unsealed in September 2018, and concluded that there had been "considerable effort" toward investigating all three Project Houston subjects.

Jooyoung Lee suggested that there was racism within the gay community, indicated by the relatively weak responses to the disappearances of the brown-skinned men in contrast with the campaign to find Kinsman. There have also been suggestions that McArthur was initially overlooked as a suspect because he is white. In 2017, Reid theorized that the killer was a person of colour like the victims, later stating this was because serial killers tend to target familiar communities.

=== Victim blaming ===
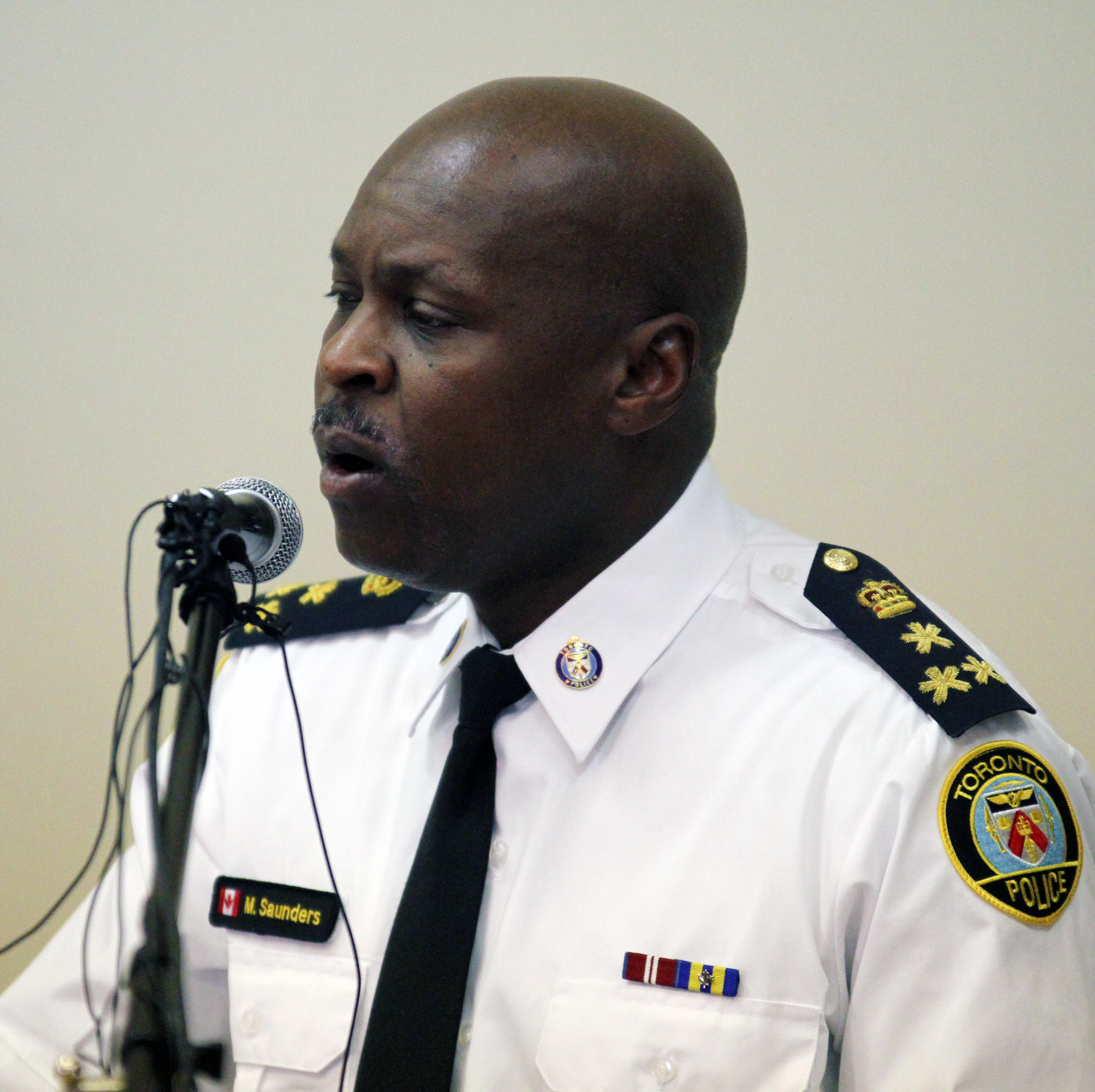
TPS Chief Mark Saunders, 2015

While defending the Project Houston investigation and responding to criticisms that police should have recognized the alleged serial killer sooner, Saunders expressed his frustrations to The Globe and Mail that some sources were reporting incidents after McArthur's arrest which could have changed the course of the investigation had they been reported at the time. He was quoted as saying, "We knew that people were missing and we knew we didn't have the right answers. But nobody was coming to us with anything." This was run on the front page of the national newspaper on February 27, 2018, under the headline: "Toronto police chief says civilians failed to help investigation into alleged serial killer".

The story was widely cited by other media outlets and caused a backlash against Saunders, with his comments taken by LGBTQ leaders and the community as victim blaming. One group held a rally outside police headquarters calling for Saunders' resignation. In a later interview with CP24, Saunders apologized if his comments to the Globe were "misconstrued or taken in the wrong context" and that he had not intended to single out the LGBTQ community. Saunders had expressed gratitude toward the community for their help in the investigation in earlier instances, on one occasion saying he was "proud of the fact that the community did help us out in this". Mayor John Tory defended Saunders as a leader who could repair relationships with the city's communities, despite his "awkward language" in the interview.

One widely covered story in the media was the account of a 52-year-old part-time university teacher from Thunder Bay who had known McArthur for about ten years. According to the man, McArthur had contacted him on the Bear411 app and suggested that they meet for dinner at Church and Wellesley. After dinner the man got into the back of McArthur's van where they began kissing, petting and undressing. At this point the man claims that McArthur grabbed his neck and violently twisted it, forcing his face into McArthur's crotch. "I really thought my neck was going to be snapped the way he twisted it." The man grabbed McArthur's elbow, squeezing the joint until he was able to make McArthur let go. The man did not report the alleged incident to police until after McArthur's arrest, yet felt police could have arrested him sooner. The man alleges this happened in April 2017, about the time that Esen disappeared.

Another man claimed to have been invited through a dating app to McArthur's apartment for a liaison involving "bondage and submission role-playing" in late July 2017. McArthur did not want to go to the man's apartment because of security cameras in the area. McArthur made a GHB cocktail for the man, who requested a dosage to relax and "heighten the sexual encounter". The man soon began sweating heavily, suggesting he had been overdosed. The man alleged that McArthur ignored his limits and safe words and blocked his airway "with his penis, with his hands, with his body weight sitting on my chest". The man said he lost consciousness and was saved by the return of McArthur's roommate. The man said he was contacted by police the day after McArthur's arrest, and from their questions realized McArthur had photographed him bound in what was described as "a kill position".

=== Alleged 2016 assault ===
In early March 2018, Idsinga said that he learned of "concerning information" in the case which he immediately reported to the professional standards unit; they began an internal investigation on March 5. Police did not release any details but Idsinga said it was serious enough to affect the careers of officers involved.

The media roughly described an incident alleged to have occurred on June 20, 2016, in which McArthur and an unidentified man whom he met through a dating app were masturbating each other in the back of McArthur's van in a McDonald's parking lot in North York. McArthur allegedly began throttling the man, who broke free and said he would report what happened to police. Sources then vary, with McArthur following the man to a police station or driving to a Scarborough police station while the man phoned police. McArthur either claimed it was the man who had choked him, or that the man had asked to be choked then panicked and fled. According to one source, McArthur was placed under arrest and taken from 41 Division in Scarborough to 32 Division in North York where the investigation continued. No occurrence report was filed and McArthur was not charged. Homicide investigators only became aware of the alleged incident after McArthur's arrest, when the man came forward again to bring it to their attention.

In an agreed statement of fact read in court, Cantlon said that the victim of the "attempted choking" had known McArthur for years. The victim called 9-1-1 after he escaped while McArthur went to the police and said the incident was consensual. He was let go, as police believed his story was credible. McArthur's 2003 conviction did not come up on background checks. McArthur had pictures of this man; in some he was wearing a fur coat similar to the one in which McArthur posed his victims.

On February 1, 2019, Sgt. Paul Gauthier from 32 Division was charged by the professional standards unit with insubordination and neglect of duty regarding policy on reporting domestic violence, such as videotaping the complainant's statement and obtaining photos of the complainant's injuries. Gauthier's attorney said that the decision to not charge McArthur in 2016 was made in consultation with Gauthier's supervisor, and that the investigation and arrest of McArthur was fully documented. The allegations against the officer are not criminal. Gauthier had fifteen years on the job and was highly regarded by colleagues, praised for his work with difficult cases involving human trafficking.

In a two-page letter emailed to colleagues and obtained by news outlets, Gauthier stated that he was being made a scapegoat. He wrote that the reports were completed and available from the night of the incident, that he had spoken to Project Prism officers regarding it after they had identified McArthur's van, and that there were no complaints then. Gauthier wrote that this changed after Saunders' February 27 interview in The Globe and Mail. The following day, Saunders' friend and former partner Idsinga called Gauthier's investigation into question with the professional standards unit. The following week it was leaked to the media, and Gauthier suggested that this was done to divert attention from Saunders' remarks. The professional standards unit received special permission from the civilian Toronto Police Services Board (TPSB) to lay charges against Gauthier, as their investigation exceeded the six-month window required under the Police Act. Gauthier's lawyer and Toronto Police Association (TPA) President Mike McCormack have stated that the case should be heard by an independent judge instead of a tribunal officer appointed by Saunders.

Gauthier has not made his first appearance at the tribunal. He has been diagnosed with post-traumatic stress disorder and wrote that he is undergoing treatment due to the toll of being blamed for the murders of Esen and Kinsman. On August 23, 2021, Gauthier was found not guilty on charges of insubordination and neglect of duty.

=== Handling of missing persons cases ===
The TPS receives over 4,000 missing-persons reports each year, with most resolved within a few days. 51 Division, which includes Church and Wellesley, had 600 missing persons between 2014 and 2018 and about thirty cases remained open in March 2018. According to Lusia Dion, who runs the website Ontario's Missing Adults, missing men are taken less seriously as, "We tend to think they can take care of themselves."

The circumstances of a disappearance are considered by TPS before committing resources to a search, especially for an adult. The city had been working to reduce the TPS budget, which exceeded $1 billion in 2016. In July 2017 the TPA claimed that there was a staffing crisis with working conditions at "a breaking point", noting that staff had been reduced by 500 officers since 2010 while a budgetary task force recommended a hiring freeze. An unexpected number of early retirements were attributed by the TPA to stress and morale, and McCormack noted "when we have a stressed-out officer, when we have people who are burned out, it really does impact public interaction".

On December 8, 2017, Saunders announced an internal probe to assess the TPS's response to Tess Richey's disappearance, to determine if there was a procedural, training or other issue. He specifically noted the importance of call uptake and absorbing the circumstances of a reported disappearance. At a February 29 TPSB meeting, Mayor Tory moved to have the internal report made public – or as much as could be released given the ongoing investigation and legal proceedings. The board and Saunders agreed to hear public input on the report.

Alloura Wells' family claimed Toronto police officers told them that her case "was not high priority" because she was homeless for several years. Her disappearance was reported by her father in early November 2017, four months after her Facebook account went dormant. Her body had been found on August 5, but was badly decomposed and was not identified until November 23. The person who found Wells' body informed both police and The 519 community centre, but 519 staff failed to follow up with police or transgender-focused organizations. Wells' friends say that this resulted in her body being unidentified for months. In mid-December, 519 executives apologized for their "mishandling of information" but placed full blame on the police. A petition started that month called for the resignation of the 519's executive director, alleging prejudice against transgender and homeless people. The 519 board called for an independent fact-finding review of the allegations.

Tory has been supportive of police while acknowledging legitimate questions about the investigation that would be answered in due course. Councillor Kristyn Wong-Tam, whose ward includes Church and Wellesley, supported police at the time of McArthur's arrest when they expressed gratitude and noted that it was a complicated case. But by the end of February they said that the police relationship with the community had to be rebuilt and in early March that they were "no longer surprised" by "incompetence" in the investigation. At McArthur's sentencing in 2019, Justice McMahon praised TPS for their investigation.

Pride Toronto had been in closed-door talks about the TPS returning to the parade after controversially being banned in 2017. Progress was made but criticisms following McArthur's arrest led to an April 2 statement by Pride's executive director and five LGBT organizations asking the TPS to withdraw its application to march in uniform. The statement cited community feelings that investigations were "insufficient" and that concerns were "dismissed". Saunders had hoped that participation would demonstrate a "shared commitment to progress and healing", and considered the many TPS members who identify as LGBTQ and wished to march in the event built on inclusiveness.

In a March 9 statement, Saunders said that he understood the public's frustrations with the limited information that had been released during the investigation. He announced finalized plans for a dedicated missing persons unit, community outreach, and a professional standards review of the Richey and Wells cases. He also stated that he believed there were serious issues of systemic bias which required an independent external review, and that he had been working with other officials on how to hold such a review without affecting investigations and prosecutions.

The missing persons unit, staffed by six police detectives and an analyst, began work in July 2018. They have been tasked with digitizing and reviewing thousands of missing persons files dating to 1953, and to act as a central hub to review each active missing persons case. Their protocols are intended to flag suspicious disappearances in the early hours of an investigation and detect if broader investigations are warranted. Investigations will continue to be run by officers in each of the TPS's seventeen divisions.

The Missing Persons Act would make it easier for police to obtain judicial orders for access to phone records or financial information in a missing persons case. Previously police could only obtain such records if a crime was suspected. The Act was passed in March 2018 by Ontario's Liberal government as part of Bill 175, but as of October 2018 it has been stalled by the new Progressive Conservative government of Premier Doug Ford with no timeline for bringing it into effect.

=== External review ===
In January 2018, the Alliance for South Asian AIDS Prevention (ASAAP) demanded that the TPSB commission an external review of the investigation. In late February Saunders came to the conclusion that the public could not get clear and credible answers without an independent external review, and suggested as much to Tory and Andy Pringle, chair of the TPSB. He further suggested that the review consider systemic bias in the force. Tory's March 7 call for a public provincial inquiry was reviewed by Ontario's attorney general, who cautiously suggested that it wait until after criminal proceedings.

In mid-March, a group of LGBTQ advocates demanded an immediate inquiry. Legal experts suggested that criminal investigations and prosecutions be protected by a publication ban on witness testimony, or by preserving records and taking witness statements under seal until the trials were over. Protocol for an external review was debated on March 22 by the TPSB, which voted to back an external review that would exclude the McArthur serial murder investigation.

In mid-April, the board unanimously approved a working group to define the specifics of the external review. The group consisted of TPSB member Ken Jeffers, ASAAP board member Shakir Rahim, sex-worker advocate Monica Forrester and lawyer Sara Mainville who specializes in cases involving indigenous peoples. The TPSB named Breese Davies, vice-president of the Criminal Lawyers' Association, in a facilitator role. The TPSB had to request $25,000 from the city's budget committee for the working group and its legal consultation fees. The working group reported on June 15 that the missing-persons investigations of McArthur's alleged victims could be examined up to the point at which the investigations involved McArthur. They estimated that the inquiry would take 15 months and cost $2.5 million. Tory was adamant that the community be adequately consulted and increased this figure to $3 million, which would go before city council.

The review is to examine TPS handling of missing-persons reports, biases within the service, and any obstacles that prevented Lisowick and Kanagaratnam from being reported missing. Specific investigations to be examined will include Project Houston, Project Prism, and the investigations into the deaths Alloura Wells and Tess Richey. Past reviews are also to be examined including the review into the 1981 bathhouse raids, the city auditor's report following the Paul Callow investigation, and the Missing Women Commission of Inquiry following the Robert Pickton case in British Columbia.

On June 25, on the recommendation of the working group, the TPSB announced that it had retained Justice Gloria Epstein, who would retire as a part-time Ontario Appeal Court judge on September 1 to lead the review. Epstein had been appointed to the Ontario Superior Court of Justice in 1993 and made a prominent ruling that the Ontario Family Law Act definition of spouse was unconstitutional because it discriminated against homosexual couples. Epstein asked Mark Sandler to serve as the review's legal counsel.

In October, the review was compiling documents and establishing an advisory panel to aid "extensive outreach to the community." The advisory panel was named in January 2019, and included Forrester, ASAAP executive director Haran Vijayanathan, activist Ron Rosenes, Indigenous lawyer Christa Big Canoe, former Ontario Court of Justice chief Brian Lennox, former member of the Gay Officers Action League Michele Lent, workplace human rights lawyer Andrew Pinto, and Parkdale Queen West Community Health Centre executive director Angela Robertson.

When McArthur pleaded guilty to eight murders on January 29, 2019, it removed concerns regarding his fair trial rights. Epstein wrote a letter to the TPSB requesting a mandate to fully examine the investigation and perform a more thorough review. Pringle was taking it under advisement, while consulting with the Ontario Attorney-General; a public inquiry can only be ordered by the provincial government. The same day, Tory spoke in favour of a "broader inquiry". A spokesperson for the Ministry of the Attorney General declined to comment as the matter was still before the courts. Civil litigation lawyer Douglas Elliott suggested that rather than conducting separate investigations, that Epstein be named to lead a public inquiry with a provincial mandate and subpoena powers.

=== Media use of photos ===
Canadian media have drawn criticism for the imbalance in images of McArthur and his alleged victims. One widely published picture is of McArthur smiling at the camera as he posed at Niagara Falls. Lisowick, in comparison, was mostly known by a police mug shot. TPS spokesman Mark Pugash explained that they only release pictures if there is a "valid investigative purpose".

Media outlets with tight deadlines obtain photos from the Internet, and copied pictures from McArthur's Facebook page and online dating profiles within minutes of his arrest. Flattering pictures that he had used to define himself thus became his image in the media. The slain men who had Facebook accounts posted fewer pictures and Lisowick, a homeless man, had no digital footprint; so the first available picture was a police-released mug shot.

Editor Kathy English said that the Toronto Star would continue to publish Facebook photos of McArthur as a journalistic duty to report reality. Editor Sylvia Stead of The Globe and Mail stated that "true news photos" should be recent, like courtroom sketches, and that the balance should be in favour of the victims. Nicki Ward, a director of the Church-Wellesley Neighbourhood Association and graphic artist, obtained a photograph of Lisowick at a vigil which she cleaned up and shared with media outlets so that his mug shot would not have to be used.

Another controversial photo was that of a dead man which police released in hopes that the public could help identify him. The Star chose not to publish the photo because of its disturbing nature. A version cleaned up by Ward to better represent the man in life and a sketch by a TPS forensic artist were released at an April 11 news conference.

=== #LoveWins ===
A free concert called #LoveWins was initiated by Kristyn Wong-Tam, the only openly LGBTQ member of city council. In production since December 2017, the event went public on March 7 through a news release and Facebook page, described as "part vigil, part celebration". The proposed March 29 event drew criticisms, from logos of corporate sponsors to holding a celebration when the unnamed dead were still in forensic laboratories. The event was chaired by Salah Bachir, president of Cineplex Media, who identified as a "queer Arab man" and was both sad and angry about the crimes, having known some of the victims personally while his sister was a landscaping client of McArthur's.

Sara Malabar, who produced the opening and closing events for 2014 WorldPride, started a Facebook page titled "Stop Love Wins Concert" and threatened to organize a protest if it was not cancelled. Another critic noted that events are pressured to go mainstream when attracting corporate sponsors, and overlook the needs of the community that they are meant to address. It was also noted that marginalized communities could make better use of the resources than by throwing a party.

On March 10, Wong-Tam's website announced that the event would be postponed to address concerns, admitting that the event had sparked unnecessary division at a historic moment for the community. Malabar offered to help in creating a more appropriate event, with more LGBTQ performers.

== Media coverage ==
The investigation, and its possible link to the still-unsolved 1970s murders, were the subject of Bob McKeown's television documentary "Murder in the Village", which aired in April 2018 as an episode of CBC Television's The Fifth Estate. Researcher Leslie Morrison won the Canadian Screen Award for Best Visual Research at the 7th Canadian Screen Awards.

In 2019, Justin Ling delved into the murders in Uncover: The Village, the third season of the CBC investigative journalism podcast Uncover. In August 2019, the CBC announced that Uncover: The Village was in development as the basis for a documentary television series.

Also in 2019, the CBC aired Michael Del Monte's documentary film Village of the Missing as an episode of its documentary series CBC Docs POV. The film was nominated for the Donald Brittain Award at the 8th Canadian Screen Awards.

In 2020, the CBC docudrama The Detectives explored the TPS investigation in two episodes, the first covering Project Houston and the second Project Prism. Canadian actor Dave Rose portrayed Bruce McArthur. In the same year Ling published the book Missing from the Village: The Story of Serial Killer Bruce McArthur, the Search for Justice, and the System That Failed Toronto's Queer Community, which won the Brass Knuckles Award for Best Nonfiction Book at the Crime Writers of Canada Awards of Excellence in 2021.

In 2021, Swedish radio station P3 aired the documentary series Verkligheten i P3 and the episode "På barrunda med en seriemördare", where Swedish gay man "Anders" told the story of how he had met McArthur in a Toronto bar in 2009, and gone on a drinking spree with him. He reports leaving McArthur after feeling increasingly uncomfortable in his company. It was only in 2019 that Anders made the connection between the convicted killer McArthur and the man called Bruce that he had met in Toronto. Also in 2021, Oxygen and Super Channel aired Catching a Serial Killer: Bruce McArthur a documentary film about the case by James Buddy Day.

In 2022, British journalist Mobeen Azhar presented a six-part true-crime series on McArthur titled Santa Claus the Serial Killer, broadcast on BBC Three. The series explores themes of race, faith, culture and sexuality. Also in 2022, Netflix aired its second season of Catching Killers, which covered the murders in the third and fourth episodes.
