= Gloria Epstein =

Canadian judge

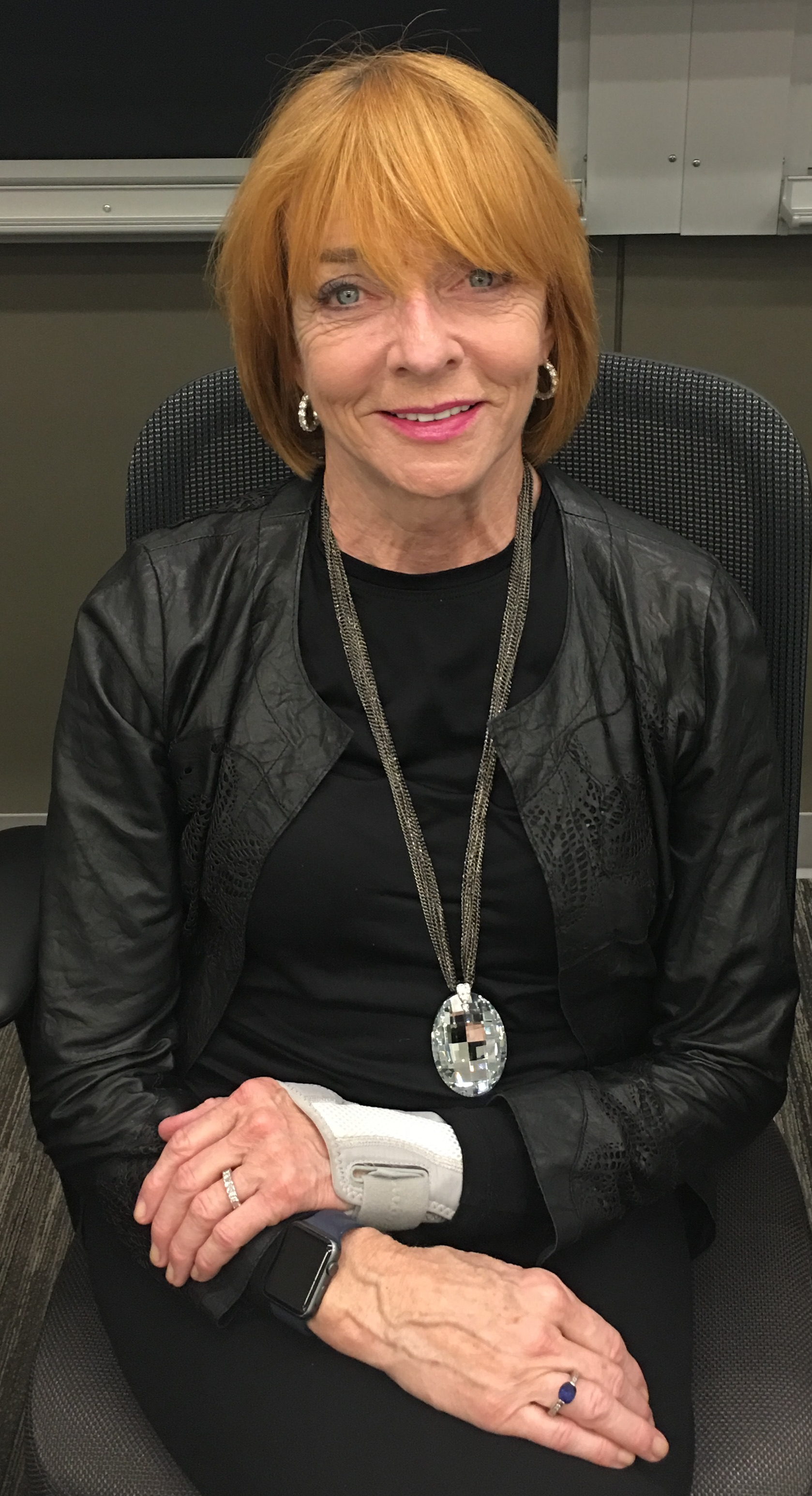
Justice Gloria Epstein in November 2016

Gloria Jean Epstein is a former judge of the Court of Appeal for Ontario. She had also previously been appointed to the Court of Ontario. She is known for her 1999 trial ruling in M v H that Ontario's Family Law Act was unconstitutional for discriminating against same-sex couples by denying them the same benefits as legally-married heterosexual couples. Epstein's decision was appealed up to the Supreme Court of Canada and upheld.

== Early life and career ==
Epstein graduated in 1972 from Queen's University, earning an Honours Bachelor of Commerce. Epstein is a graduate of the University of Toronto Faculty of Law, earning a Bachelor of Laws in 1977. She founded one of the first Toronto-based law firms that was owned by a woman. She often lectures on the role of female lawyers in Canadian law and her own experience in being raised to the bench while raising three children.

== Judicial career ==
In 1999, Epstein, then serving on the Ontario Superior Court of Justice, ruled in M v H that the definition of a spouse in the Ontario Family Law Act was unconstitutional because it discriminated against same-sex couples by not providing them the same benefits as legally married heterosexual couples. The ruling was upheld by the Ontario Court of Appeal and the Supreme Court of Canada after appeals by the Ontario government of Premier Mike Harris. That same year, she also ruled that the plaintiff of Joly v Pelletier had no valid standing before the Court because his claim that he was a Martian meant he was not a "person" for the purposes of court proceedings.

In 2011, Epstein was considered a candidate to fill a vacant Supreme Court of Canada seat for Ontario, which ultimately went to Court of Appeal judge Andromache Karakatsanis.

In 2013, Epstein won a Toronto YWCA Women of Distinction Award for her contributions to the legal field. From 2013 to 2015, Epstein served as the volunteer president of the University of Toronto Law Alumni Association.

In 2014, after the December 2013 retirement of Warren Winkler as Chief Justice of Ontario, Epstein was considered as one of the two leading candidates to replace him as Ontario's highest judge. On January 1, 2015, Epstein retired to become a supernumerary judge, and was replaced as a full-time judge by Bradley W. Miller.

== Post-judicial career ==
The Toronto Police Services Board chair cited Epstein's "legal rigour and reputational excellence" as she was retained to head an independent review of the handling of missing persons investigations by Toronto police. Epstein retired as a part-time judge on September 1, 2018, to dedicate herself to the review, which was to conclude in early 2020.

In April 2021, Epstein's report found that both regular investigative failings as well as the Toronto police's systemic discrimination against the LGBTQ community hampered their efforts in the Bruce Mcarthur murders, the murder of Tess Richey, the death of Alloura Wells, and other cases she reviewed. While Epstein did not find a deliberate intention to discriminate, she highlighted issues that arose from police "misconceptions and stereotypical ideas" about LGBTQ people such as failing to understand why witnesses might be reluctant to come forward from the community because of a long history of mistrust.

== Personal life ==
Epstein began horse-riding in 1986, when she was 35. At The Royal 2012 she won the Adult Amateur Stake with a horse named Moonshadow. Epstein was overall Adult Amateurs champion with a horse called High Voltage on the Canadian Circuit in back-to-back years. In June 2013, Epstein was both the Champion and Reserve Champion in the Adult Amateurs at the Palgrave Summer Classic show.
