= Uncover (podcast) =

True crime podcast

Uncover is a Canadian investigative journalism podcast, launched in 2018 by the Canadian Broadcasting Corporation. Each season is hosted by a different journalist, and delves into Canadian and international crime stories.

The second season, Bomb on Board, won the RTNDA Canada award for Best Original / Enterprise Journalism in 2019. In August 2019, the CBC announced that the third season, The Village, was in development as the basis for a documentary television series.

As with other CBC podcasts, episodes of the series have aired terrestrially on CBC Radio One as substitute programming in the summer season and on public holidays.

== Seasons ==
| Season | Title | Topic | Host | Air Dates | Ref |
|---|---|---|---|---|---|
| 1 | Escaping NXIVM | NXIVM | Josh Bloch | September 2018 | |
| 2 | Bomb on Board | The bombing of Canadian Pacific Air Lines Flight 21. | Ian Hanomansing and Johanna Wagstaffe | November 2018 | |
| 3 | The Village | Unsolved murders in Toronto's Gay Village. | Justin Ling | April 2019 | |
| 4 | The Cat Lady Case | The disappearance of Joan Lawrence. | Zander Sherman | July 2019 | |
| 5 | Sharmini | The disappearance of Sharmini Anandavel. | Michelle Shephard | September 2019 | |
| 6 | Satanic Panic | 1990s Satanic Panic in Martensville, Saskatchewan. | Lisa Bryn Rundle | February 2020 | |
| 7 | Dead Wrong | The murder of Brenda Way and wrongful imprisonment of Glen Assoun. | Tim Bousquet | June 2020 | |
| 8 | Brainwashed | Investigation into the CIA's experiments in mind control. | Michelle Shephard | September 2020 | |
| 9 | Evil by Design | Assault allegations against fashion mogul Peter Nygård. | Timothy Sawa | March 2021 | |
| 10 | The Village 2 | Investigation into the deaths of two Toronto trans women, Alloura Wells and Cassandra Do. | Justin Ling | July 2021 | |
| 11 | Carrie Low VS. | Carrie Low's mission to hold Nova Scotia police accountable for failure to investigate her assault. | Maggie Rahr | November 2021 | |
| 12 | A Death in Cryptoland | The death of Gerald Cotten, CEO of QuadrigaCX. | Takara Small | December 2021 | |
| 13 | White Hot Hate | Journalist Ryan Thorpe's infiltration of a white supremacist organization. | Michelle Shephard | December 2021 | |
| 14 | Boys Like Me | Incel subculture and related crimes. | Ellen Chloe Bateman | January 2022 | |
| 15 | The Village | The murder of gay men in 1990s Montreal. | Justin Ling | June 2022 | |
| 16 | Kuper Island | Kuper Island Residential School | Duncan McCue | August 2022 | |
| 17 | The Kill List | The murder of human rights activist Karima Baloch. | Mary Lynk | December 2022 | |
| 18 | Pressure Cooker | Follows an investigation into a couple accused of terrorism. | Dan Pierce | January 2023 | |
| 19 | Run, Hide, Repeat | The story of host Pauline Dakin's tumultuous childhood. | Pauline Dakin | February 2023 | |
| 20 | The Africas vs. America | The 1985 bombing of a Black neighborhood in West Philadelphia, targeting a family of Black radicals known as MOVE. | Matthew Amha | May 2023 | |
| 21 | The No Good, Terribly Kind, Wonderful Lives and Tragic Deaths of Barry and Honey Sherman | The lives and deaths of Barry and Honey Sherman, one of Canada's richest couples. | Kathleen Goldhar | June 2023 | |
| 22 | The Band Played On | Five decades of sexual abuse of teens by three teachers at Bell High School in Ottawa. | Julie Ireton | August 2023 | |
| 23 | The Pit | The murder of trucker Sheree Fertuck in Saskatchewan. | Alicia Bridges & Victoria Dinh | December 2023 | |
| 24 | Hunting Warhead | Follows a search for the people behind a child-abuse site on the dark web. | Daemon Fairless | February 2024 | |
| 25 | Love, Janessa | The search for Janessa Brazil, a cam girl whose photos are used in various catfishing schemes. | Hannah Ajala | March 2024 | |
| 26 | The Outlaw Ocean | 7-part series on crimes at sea. | Ian Urbina | April 2024 | |
| 27 | Bloodlines | The disappearance of 2-year-old Salmaan in the final days of the war against ISIS, as well as the fates of other children like him. | Poonam Taneja | July 2024 | |
| 28 | Someone Knows Something | The Ku Klux Klan murders of two 19-year-old black men, Henry Hezekiah Dee and Charles Eddie Moore, in Southwest Mississippi in May 1964. | David Ridgen | September 2024 | |
| 29 | Capital Gazette | The June 2018 mass shooting at The Capital Gazette newspaper in Annapolis, MD. | Kelly McEvers | October 2024 | |
| 30 | Bad Results | A DNA lab offering prenatal paternity tests often identifies the wrong men as fathers. | Rachel Houlihan & Jorge Barrera | December 2024 | |
| 31 | The Banned Teacher | Anne-Marie Robinson reached out to host Julie Ireton to share her story of being raped by her music teacher as a teen, leading to the discovery of more victims. | Julie Ireton | January 2025 | |
| 32 | Sea of Lies | The discovery of a body by local fishermen leads to a multi-country manhunt. | Sam Mullins | March 2025 | |
| 33 | Calls From a Killer | Information received in jailhouse calls from murderer Clifford Olson. | Arlene Bynon & Nathaniel Frum | June 2025 | |
| 34 | Dirtbag Climber | A mysterious climber, alias Jesse James, is found dead in Squamish, BC. | Steven Chua | September 2025 | |
| 35 | Allison after NXIVM | Allison Mack is interviewed about Mack's time in Keith Raniere's sex cult, NXIVM | Natalie Robehmed and Vanessa Grigoriadis | November 2025 | |
| 36 | The Cult Queen of Canada | A history of Romana Didulo's conspiracy theories and cult | Rachel Browne | April 2026 | |
| 37 | Expert Witness | An investigation into Cybercheck, an AI tool used in police investigations in the United States. | Sam Mullins | June 2026 | |
