= Joly v Pelletier =

1999 Ontario Superior Court of Justice case

Joly v. Pelletier et al.
- Court: Ontario Superior Court of Justice
- Full case name: Rene Joly v. Pelletier and others, [1999] O.J. No. 1728 [QL], 1999 CarswellOnt 1587, 1999 WL 33187845 (Carswell) (Ontario Superior Court of Justice, Court File Nos. 99-CV-166273 and 99-CV-167339, May 16, 1999)
- Decided: May 16, 1999

Court membership
- Judge sitting: Gloria Epstein

Keywords
- identity, Martians

Joly v Pelletier is a 1999 Ontario Superior Court of Justice case that dealt with the requirements of legal standing and vexatious litigants. The plaintiff, Rene Joly, filed a lawsuit in that was dismissed by Justice Epstein as frivolous or vexatious or an abuse of the process of the Court.

== Lawsuits ==
=== Rulings ===
Joly's filed suit against the Canadian Government (specifically Art Eggleton), Citibank, Shoppers Drug Mart and many others. Joly even formally submitted a "well prepared, thoughtful" argument that his DNA tests, which would prove he was not human, had been falsified. Supposedly, he was cloned from debris found on Mars by NASA in the 1960s. Judge Epstein found no reason for Joly not to stand trial or to represent himself:

I made the observation that in every respect Mr. Joly properly conducted himself before the Court. He presented himself as polite, articulate, intelligent and appeared to understand completely the issues before the Court and the consequences should I grant the relief sought.

Thus, Judge Epstein proceeded with the case, and following a motion filed by the defense, dismissed the case as frivolous and vexatious, explaining:

Rule 1.03 defines plaintiff as "a person who commences an action". The New Shorter Oxford English Dictionary defines person as "an individual human being". Section 29 of the Interpretation Act provides that a person includes a corporation. It follows that if the plaintiff is not a person in that he is neither a human being nor a corporation, he cannot be a plaintiff as contemplated by the Rules of Civil Procedure. The entire basis of Mr. Joly's actions is that he is a martian, not a human being. There is certainly no suggestion that he is a corporation. I conclude therefore, that Mr. Joly, on his pleading as drafted, has no status before the Court.
