= Missing from the Village =

2020 non fiction book by Justin Ling

- Author: Justin Ling
- Publisher: McClelland & Stewart
- Pages: 304
- ISBN: 978-0771048647

Missing from the Village: The Story of Serial Killer Bruce McArthur, the Search for Justice, and the System That Failed Toronto's Queer Community is a 2020 non-fiction book by Canadian journalist Justin Ling.

The book reports on the 2010–2017 Toronto serial homicides by serial killer Bruce McArthur and is critical of the police investigation.

The book won an Arthur Ellis Award for Best Nonfiction Crime in 2021.

== Production ==
Missing from the Village was written by Toronto journalist Justin Ling after five years of research. Missing from the Village is Ling's first book.

== Synopsis ==
The book documents the murder of queer men by Bruce McArthur in Toronto's gay village in the Church and Wellesley neighbourhood. It documents what it describes as police failures, the community response, and the eight victims of McArthur. Failures to catch McArthur are attributed to racism, transphobia, and homophobia. Ling contrasts how much Toronto's queer men are policed by law enforcement, but also under protected by the same authorities.

== Critical reception ==
Diane Anderson-Minshall described the book as "extraordinary." Courtney Hardwick, writing in In Magazine described the book as a "must read" for people interested in the relationship between police and LGBT communities. The Globe and Mail included the book in its favourite 100 books of 2020.

The book won the 2021 Brass Knuckles Award for Best Nonfiction Crime Book from the Crime Writers of Canada Awards of Excellence. It was shortlisted for the Toronto Book Awards in 2021.
