= Bradley W. Miller =

Canadian jurist

Bradley W. Miller is a Canadian jurist who is a justice of the Court of Appeal for Ontario.

Miller graduated from the University of British Columbia with a Bachelor of Commerce and a Bachelor of Laws in 1992. He received an LLM from the University of Edinburgh in 1994 and a DPhil in law from the University of Oxford in 2004. Between 1994 and 2011, he practised law at Miller Thomson and at other firms in Toronto and Port Coquitlam, British Columbia. He was a professor at the University of Western Ontario Faculty of Law from 2005 until his appointment to the Ontario Superior Court of Justice on January 16, 2015.

Miller was elevated to the Court of Appeal for Ontario on June 26, 2015, replacing Gloria Epstein, after spending six months as a justice of the Superior Court. As of June 2015, he had written no published opinions as a Superior Court judge.

As of 2015, Miller endorsed originalism, a theory of constitutional adjudication according to which constitutions should be interpreted according to the intent of their drafters. He also opposed same-sex marriage as of that date.

Miller wrote the majority judgment in Toronto (City) v Ontario (Attorney General) when it came before the Court of Appeal in September 2019. In July 2020, he wrote a long dissent to the majority's holding in a Charter challenge to amendments to the Criminal Code involving conditional sentences as applied to Indigenous offenders. Miller also dissented in a case involving the legal test for a finding of racial profiling which came before the Court of Appeal in May 2021.
