= Cybercheck =

Generative AI tool

Cybercheck is a generative AI tool that purports to identify the perpetrators of crime through geolocation with "90% accuracy." It has been used in thousands of criminal cases across the United States, including death penalty cases, but serious doubts have been raised about its accuracy and reliability. Its creator, Adam Mosher, has repeatedly declined to explain how the technology works, claiming that it is proprietary software. Mosher has said under oath that Cybercheck does not retain records of where it obtains its data, how it makes connections between data points or how it calculates its accuracy ratings.

In some jurisdictions, including a case in Colorado, judges ruled evidence produced by Cybercheck inadmissible, and charges were dropped as a result. In April of 2024, lawyers in Akron, Ohio accused Mosher of lying under oath.

The most well covered case employing Cybercheck is that of the 2022 conviction of Adarus Black, who was given a life sentence after being accused of a drive-by shooting, despite a lack of direct evidence. Jurors said their decision was based entirely on Mosher's testimony.

It is currently the subject of a CBC Uncover investigation.
