= Crews & Tangos =

Gay bar in Toronto

Coordinates: 43.6642754°N 79.3805022°W

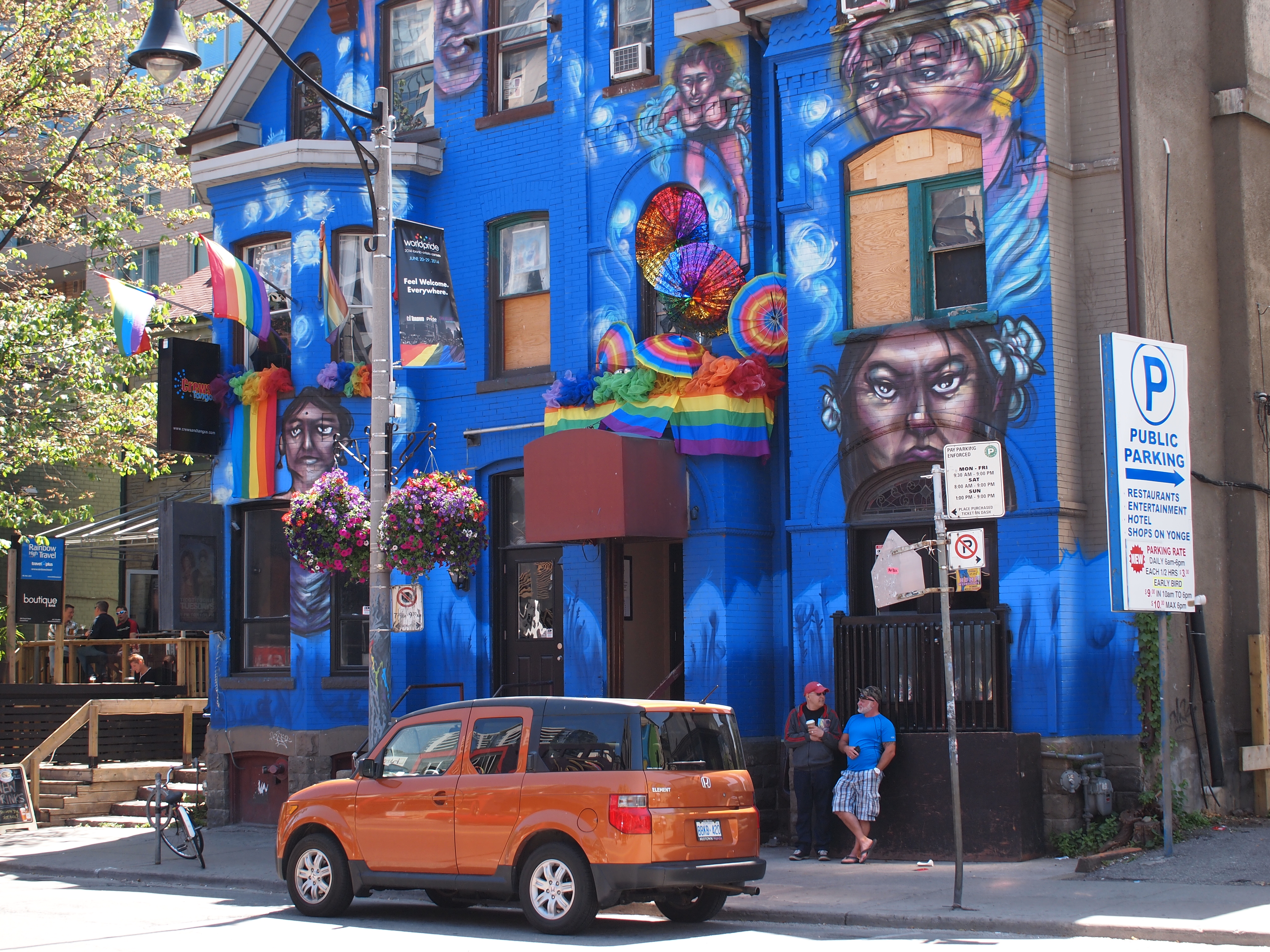
- Crews & Tangos in 2014
- Interactive map of Crews & Tangos
- Address: 508 Church Street; Toronto, Ontario; Canada M4Y 2C8

Construction
- Opened: 1994

Website
- https://www.instagram.com/crewsandtangos/?hl=en

Crews & Tangos is a gay bar located at 508 Church Street in the gay village in Toronto, Ontario, Canada. Established in 1994, the bar is renowned for hosting nightly drag shows.

== Appearances in popular media ==
The first floor of the bar serves as the main location for the "Miss Church Street" pageant in the CBC Gem series QUEENS.

== Homicide investigation ==
Crews & Tangos was connected to the murder investigation of Tess Richey. The night of Richey's disappearance in 2017, Richey and a friend visited the bar and security footage from the venue was used to outline the sequence of events during the court proceedings.

== Gentrification concerns and heritage status ==
In March 2020, news began to spread about a proposal for a new condo development where Crews & Tangos is located. Concerned community members created a Change.org petition garnering over 30,000 signatures. Following the outcry, Kristyn Wong-Tam (city councillor for Toronto Centre) conducted a preliminary report of the space, and in February 2022, the City of Toronto granted heritage status to the buildings located at 508 and 510 Church Street.

== See also ==
- List of LGBTQ bars
