= Disappearance of Joan Lawrence =

1998 missing person case in Ontario, Canada

Joan Lawrence
- Born: Dorothy Joan Lawrence; 1921; Ottawa, Ontario, Canada
- Disappeared: 1998 (aged 77); Huntsville, Muskoka, Ontario, Canada
- Status: Missing for 28 years, 6 months and 22 days
- Spouse: Burton Gamble (m. 1943)

Joan Lawrence (1921–1998) was an elderly Huntsville, Ontario woman who went missing in 1998. Her disappearance led the Ontario Provincial Police to discover that three other seniors—John Semple, 90, John Crofts, 71, and Ralph Grant, 70—were also missing, presumed murdered. Though Lawrence lived a solitary life, and was known locally as the "Cat Lady," she had previously worked as a poet and journalist, and was in the process of reporting her landlords for "frauds, theft, mistreatment and neglect" at the time of her disappearance.

== Life and work ==
Lawrence was born in Ottawa in 1921. Her parents were Irene Claire McCarthy (b. 1894) and William Lawrence (b. 1887). In 1940, at age 19, Lawrence began work as a freelance writer for the Toronto Star, Ottawa Citizen, and others. A few years later, at age 26, she lost her advertising job "for trying to write a book while she was supposed to be working." In 1943, Lawrence married an army lieutenant named Burton Gamble, whom she divorced in 1949. Later in the life, Lawrence resided in Toronto while caring for her elderly parents. After their deaths, she relocated, arriving in Huntsville in the 1980s.

Lawrence began taking in the community's unwanted kittens, eventually amassing dozens of cats. In 1994, her shack burned down in an accidental fire. After that, she lived in boarding houses and the Salvation Army, but continued to feed her cats. In 1997, she moved into "Cedar Pines Christian Retirement Lodge," a retirement residence owned by Kathrine Laan. Later that year, she moved onto property owned by Kathrine's brothers, David, Walter, and Paul Laan. According to community members, the "Laan farm" was the only place she could keep her cats. For $600 a month, Lawrence rented an eight-by-ten-foot shed that had limited heat, and no insulation or running water.

In September 1998, a social worker alerted police to conditions on the Laan farm. Police and the fire chief attended, discovering Lawrence in the shed. Adult Protective Services was notified, and began making arrangements to find Lawrence another home. In the meantime, Lawrence was moved from the shed into a decommissioned van on the same property.

== Disappearance and subsequent investigation ==
Lawrence disappeared in November 1998. She was reported missing by 57-year-old Allan Marshall, a former limo driver who also resided on the Laan farm and had become close with Lawrence. Marshall told police he heard gunshots and saw a backhoe being operated around the time of Lawrence's disappearance. Police obtained a search warrant for the property that December. Despite an extensive search by lake, land, and air, they failed to find Lawrence's body. Notably, half a dozen of her cats had been fatally shot. The Laans' uncle, Ron Allen, eventually claimed responsibility.

The OPP investigation continued, and by July 2000 police had discovered three more of Laans' residents who could not be accounted for: 90-year-old John Semple, 71-year-old John Crofts, and 70-year-old Ralph Grant. Like other Laan residents, the missing men were marginalized, and had been brought to Muskoka from homeless shelters in Toronto. These men's pension cheques continued to be cashed although they had not been seen on the Laan property or elsewhere. The Laans had failed to report that they were missing. This led police to uncover a "pension cheque scam," and charged David, Walter, Walter's wife Karen, Paul, and Kathrine with defrauding the federal government of the benefit money it was providing Semple, Crofts, Grant, and other residents who had died or were missing. The charges against David and Karen were dropped, but Walter, Kathrine, and Paul pled guilty.

The Laans' retirement homes were shut down by the authorities. After serving conditional sentences, Walter, Paul, and Kathrine moved away from Muskoka, as did David. No one in the family has ever provided a sworn statement to police or cooperated with the investigation. In 2001, Walter Laan told the Toronto Sun that "Police were trying to sink us for these missing people." He added the case was "really a dead issue now."

In July 2019, a podcast detailing the case was released by the Canadian Broadcasting Corporation. Shortly afterward, the OPP held its first-ever press conference on the topic of Lawrence's disappearance and suspected homicide in the 21 years that her case had been open. Afterward, lead detective Rob Matthews said new people had come forward with information.

== Media coverage ==
In 2017, the disappearances of Joan Lawrence, John Semple, John Crofts, and Ralph Grant were featured in "Cottage Country Murder," a magazine article in The Walrus. The article was written by Zander Sherman, who had been researching the story since 2014. Sherman also consulted on "Murder in Cottage Country," a co-produced documentary by CBC's The Fifth Estate. In 2019, Sherman and two colleagues won a Canadian Screen Award for their work on the documentary. Later that year, Sherman hosted the fourth season of the CBC podcast Uncover, called "The Cat Lady Case."

== See also ==
- Senicide
- List of people who disappeared mysteriously: 1910–1990
