= Justin Ling =

Canadian journalist

Justin Ling is a Canadian investigative journalist. He is most noted as the author of the 2020 book Missing from the Village, about the serial homicides by Bruce McArthur in Toronto during 2010–2017.

== Career ==
Ling is a Montreal-based freelance journalist who writes about security, privacy, politics, foreign policy, law, and defense. He has written for publications including Vice, Maclean's, Foreign Policy, and The Globe and Mail.

His book Missing from the Village won the 2021 Brass Knuckles Award for Best Crime Nonfiction from the Crime Writers of Canada Awards of Excellence, and it was shortlisted for the Toronto Book Awards in 2021.

Ling has also hosted three seasons of the Canadian Broadcasting Corporation podcast Uncover. The podcast explores both the McArthur case and similar cases of unsolved murders in the Church and Wellesley area of Toronto under the season-long title The Village. Ling won an Amnesty International Canada media award for the second season of the podcast.
