= Zander Sherman =

Canadian author and journalist

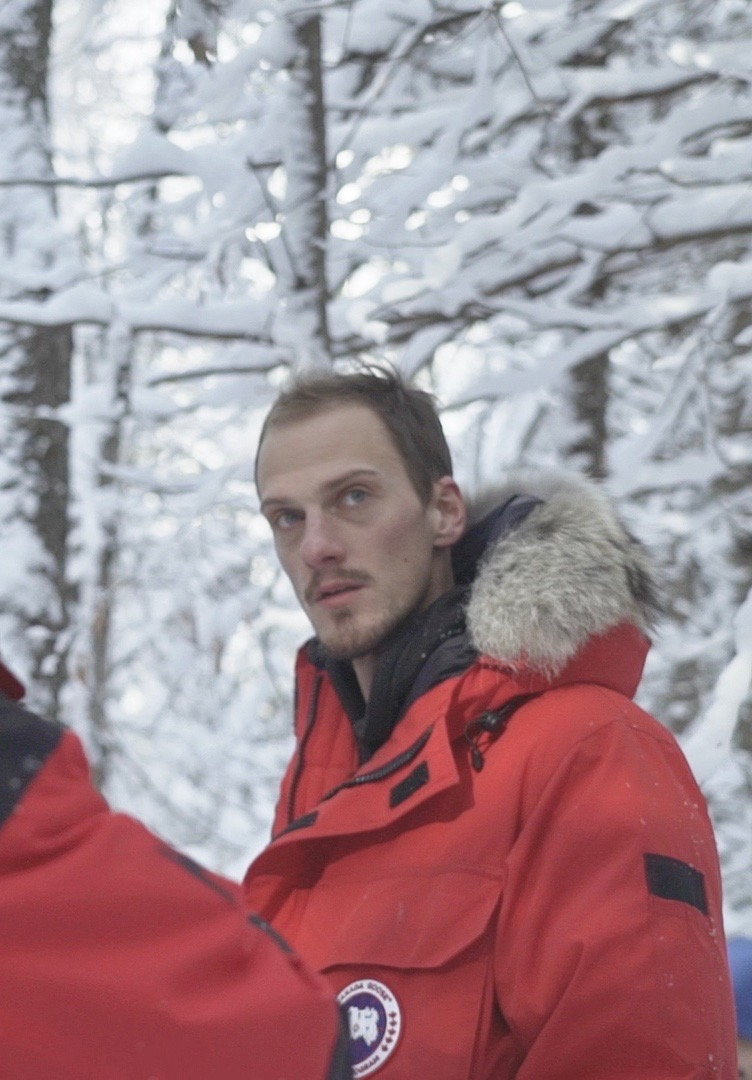
- Born: Muskoka, Ontario
- Occupation: Nonfiction writer
- Writing career
- Notable work: The Curiosity of School
- Website: www.zandersherman.com

Zander Sherman is a Canadian author and journalist.

== Early life and education ==
Sherman is the great-grandson of Frank A. Sherman, cofounder of Dofasco, a steel company in Hamilton, Ontario. Sherman grew up in Muskoka, where he was homeschooled by his mother, whom he credits with his interest in writing.

== Career ==
Sherman's career began after graduating Bracebridge and Muskoka Lakes Secondary School, when he got a job as a copyeditor at a local magazine. Interested in the history of school, he eventually left to write a book. The Curiosity of School: Education and the Dark Side of Enlightenment was published by Penguin Random House in 2012, and debuted on the national bestseller list.

Sherman then turned to other stories. In 2014, he began investigating the disappearance of Joan Lawrence, an elderly woman from Huntsville, Ontario, who went missing under suspicious circumstances. Sherman's work on a CBC documentary about the case won him a Canadian Screen Award in 2019. An adapted version of the story was released on July 9 as the fourth season of Uncover, a CBC podcast. Sherman wrote and hosted the six-part series, entitled "The Cat Lady Case," and he and a friend scored the soundtrack.

Sherman has written extensively for various magazines including Vanity Fair and Esquire. His subjects include politics, crime, mental health, education, and memoir. Sherman also composes lyrics for the band Larch.

On June 12, 2020, Sherman won a gold National Magazine Award for his story "Forged by Fire," published by The Globe & Mail's Report on Business Magazine.
