= Murder of Tess Richey =

2017 murder in Canada

Tess Richey (30 November 1994 – 25 November 2017) was a Canadian woman who was killed after a Friday night out with a friend in the Church and Wellesley neighbourhood of Toronto. Four days after she had disappeared, her body was discovered by her mother at the bottom of an outdoor stairwell two houses from where she was last seen. A homicide investigation led to the arrest of Kalen Schlatter, who has been convicted of first-degree murder.

The Toronto Police Service (TPS) was criticized for failing to find the body when it was so close to where Richey had disappeared. TPS Chief Mark Saunders quickly ordered an internal review of her case, and later recommended an external review of how the TPS conducts missing persons investigations. Richey's death, along with the deaths of other missing persons at Church and Wellesley, led the TPS to create a dedicated missing-persons unit.

== Biography ==
Tess Richey
- Born: 30 November 1994; North Bay, Ontario, Canada
- Disappeared: 25 November 2017
- Died: 25 November 2017 (aged 22); Toronto, Ontario, Canada
- Cause of death: Strangulation
- Body discovered: 29 November 2017; Church and Wellesley
- Education: Seneca College
- Mother: Christine Hermeston

Tess Richey was born 30 November 1994, the youngest of five daughters in a close-knit family from North Bay, Ontario. She attended E.W. Norman Public School and Widdifield Secondary School. Richey worked as an assistant manager at the Days Inn in North Bay before moving to Toronto.

She completed the flight services program at Seneca College in April 2017 and applied for jobs with airlines and a Toronto hotel. In the meantime, she juggled multiple part-time jobs, working primarily at a downtown coffee bar. With no job offers from the airlines or hotel, she began studying Italian and seeking an au pair position in Italy, still wishing to travel.

Rachel Richey, her only sister living in Toronto, described Tess as her best friend and soulmate. She said that Tess was "spoiled rotten" as the family's youngest child, but also described her as a hard worker and very protective of the family.

She was a marathon runner, about 1.57 m (5 ft 2 in) and 52 kg (115 lb) with a petite build.

== Disappearance ==
Richey spent the afternoon of Friday 24 November 2017 at her sister Rachel's house in midtown Toronto, sharing a meal, games, and conversation. Richey left the house around 11:30 pm and went to the nearby Church Street strip for a night out with a high school friend from North Bay who she had not seen in two and a half years. They went to Crews & Tangos, a drag bar on Church Street that was popular with students and young people.

According to Richey's friend, they had consumed a large amount of alcohol before they left the bar, sometime after 1:30 am. They walked to Dundonald Street, one block north of Wellesley Street East, and stopped outside a house to talk with the woman who lived there and an unidentified man. Richey's friend received a text at 4 am from her boyfriend requesting that she return home and walked to the College Street streetcar.

Rachel sent text messages to Richey the next morning starting at 8:45 am but did not hear back, and by evening realized that the messages had not been delivered. Rachel then started phoning hospitals and the police.

Richey had used the same account as her mother for her Fitbit and used her mother's credit card for her Uber account. From these accounts, the family had received a message that Richey had taken about 300 steps after 3 am followed by a sequence of 4 am notifications that indicated she had requested a ride from Uber that was then cancelled, though it was unclear who had cancelled the trip.

A missing persons investigation was initiated by officers from Toronto Police Service (TPS) 41 Division in the east end of the city, where Richey had previously lived, rather than 51 Division where she was last seen. TPS stated on 28 November that they had few leads on Richey's whereabouts and expressed concerns for her safety.

On 27 November, Richey's mother Christine Hermeston and other family members drove 4 hours from North Bay to search for the missing woman. They spent the next two days putting up posters, handing out flyers, asking for information and organizing searches at Church and Wellesley. On the afternoon of 29 November, Hermeston and a friend took a closer look at a house closed for renovation, two doors from where Richey was last seen. Hermeston found her daughter's body at the bottom of a narrow stairwell to a basement apartment, which she said was like looking into a grave.

Police officers from 51 Division were called in around 4 pm. The body had no visible signs of trauma and due to evidence at the scene and interviews with witnesses, her death was not initially treated as suspicious. Police thought the death was an accident, however a post-mortem examination conducted on 1 December found that she died from a neck compression, and her death was ruled a homicide.

== Homicide investigation ==
The investigation was turned over to the TPS homicide squad on 1 December and police officers continued to canvass the area for video surveillance and potential witnesses. By 3 December, investigators were looking for a man Richey was alone with on Church Street shortly before her death.

At a news conference on 8 December, Detective Sergeant Graham Gibson outlined the sequence of events: After leaving Crews & Tango, Richey and her friend went to a hot dog cart at the intersection where they met a number of people including the unidentified man who had become a suspect in the murder. The three spent some time talking with a man and woman on Dundonald Street, then went their separate ways. Richey and the suspect walked north and video surveillance showed them entering an alley at 582 Church Street and a basement stairwell where Richey's body was later found. The footage then showed the man leaving the stairwell by himself.

Police released images of the suspect and asked for the public's help in identifying him. In January, Richey's family was continuing to circulate the images in hopes that someone would recognize the man.

In late January, CBC News interviewed the woman who lived on Dundonald Street. She said that she was outside smoking with a friend when Richey, her friend, and the unidentified man walked by her house and they struck up a conversation around 3:30 am. She said that Richey was upset about breaking up with her boyfriend and the man with them – who she recalled little of and said that he "blended in with the background" – comforted Richey. Around 3:45 am Richey's friend received a text and the group left heading west toward Yonge Street.

== Arrest and continuing investigation ==
TPS arrested Kalen Schlatter, a 21-year-old man who did contract work on property exteriors, near his residence in the west-end neighbourhood of Earlscourt at about 11 pm on 4 February 2018.

On 5 February, it was announced that Schlatter had been charged with second-degree murder in Richey's death. Police confirmed at that time that Schlatter was the man from the released surveillance images, believed to be the last person who had been with Richey. He had no police record prior to his arrest.

On the same day, Global News reported that Schlatter had witnessed an attempted murder in August 2017, when a man allegedly attacked his neighbour with a hammer. At the time, Schlatter had told Global that he had intervened to help the injured person.

Investigators had originally believed that Richey and Schlatter first met on the day she died and that her death was a crime of opportunity. However, on 21 March, the charges were upgraded to first-degree murder after new evidence had been found.

== Court proceedings ==
Schlatter made a brief appearance at the College Park courthouse when he was charged on 5 February, after which he was remanded into police custody. He then made brief courtroom appearances via video.

Schlatter appeared at a bail hearing on 24 July. The hearing concluded on 13 August, and denied his bail request; the reasons for this were not reported due to a publication ban. In December, following a preliminary hearing under Justice Mavin Wong, Schlatter was ordered to stand trial in the Superior Court of Justice for first-degree murder. He appeared there briefly on 31 December and a judicial pretrial was scheduled to begin on 17 January 2019.

Schlatter's murder trial was scheduled to begin on 13 January 2020, and was expected to last six weeks. On 23 March 2020, he was found guilty of first degree murder.

On 9 January 2024, Schlatter was denied an appeal.

== Effects ==
=== Internal review ===
TPS was greatly criticized for failing to find Richey's body, which had been located by her mother within 15 metres (50 ft) of where she was last seen. On 4 December 2017, Global News, which broke the story, was told by a police spokesperson that the professional standards unit was looking into the initial stages of the investigation and that they had undisclosed concerns with how the missing persons case was handled.

Mark Mendelson, a former TPS homicide detective, said that the circumstances surrounding a disappearance determine the priority a missing persons case is going to receive. Whether uniformed officers become involved in a physical search depends on whether police suspect foul play, noting that it is a "big step" to begin a search, especially for an adult.

On 12 June 2018, two TPS officers from 51 Division were charged at a police tribunal with misconduct and neglect of duty under the Police Services Act. They had responded to a call on 26 November 2017, the day after Richey was reported missing, to investigate an address. It is alleged that they learned it was Richey's last known location but failed to conduct a thorough search of the area, canvas the neighbourhood, or notify a superior, in violation of missing-persons procedures.

However, Toronto Police Association (TPA) President Mike McCormack said that the officers were on a "check address call" and not involved in the main missing-person investigation. McCormack stated that they checked that address, some of the adjoining addresses, and went "above and beyond" their assigned task. Sources suggested to the Toronto Sun that the Dundonald Street address the officers were sent to was not actually Richey's last known location but a different house where Richey had previously resided. Documents filed to the tribunal stated that the address was 40 metres (130 ft) from where Richey's body was found, while previous reports stated that her last known location was one-third of this distance from her body.

Both officers remained on active duty while the tribunal's hearing was adjourned pending the completion of Schlatter's trial.

=== External review ===
TPS Chief Mark Saunders held an 8 December 2017 media update on four separate cases in Church and Wellesley: Richey's homicide, the death of Alloura Wells, and the disappearances of Selim Esen and Andrew Kinsman. There were fears in the community of a serial killer behind the disappearances, but police said they had no evidence to link the cases.

In late February, Saunders suggested to Mayor John Tory and Toronto Police Services Board (TPSB) Chair Andy Pringle that an external review into the handling of the missing persons cases was warranted. He emphasized the importance of the reports being made public in order for TPS to keep the public's confidence. On 18 April, in a unanimous vote, the TPSB created a working group to draw up rules for an external review.

Additionally, in response to the disappearances, plans for a dedicated missing persons unit were finalized in March 2018.

== See also ==
- 2010–2017 Toronto serial homicides
- Death of Alloura Wells
- List of solved missing person cases: post–2000
