= The Scott Mission =

- Predecessor: The Presbyterian Mission to the Jews
- Founded: 1941
- Founder: Morris and Annie Zeidman
- Type: Christian non-denominational charity for the homeless
- Location: Toronto, Ontario, Canada
- Coordinates: 43°39′31″N 79°24′02″W
- Employees: 160 full-time and part-time staff
- Website: www.scottmission.com

The Scott Mission is a Christian non-denominational charity organization in Ontario, Canada, providing services to poor, homeless, and vulnerable people. The mission is based in downtown Toronto and aims to offer practical, emotional, and spiritual support for thousands of people each year.

Morris Zeidman, an ordained Presbyterian minister who was born in Częstochowa, Poland, and converted to Christianity from Judaism, founded The Scott Mission with his wife Anne in 1941. It was their belief that the hunger of the soul needed to be addressed as well as the hunger of the physical body.

== Services ==
Outside The Scott Mission, Toronto, May 17, 2007

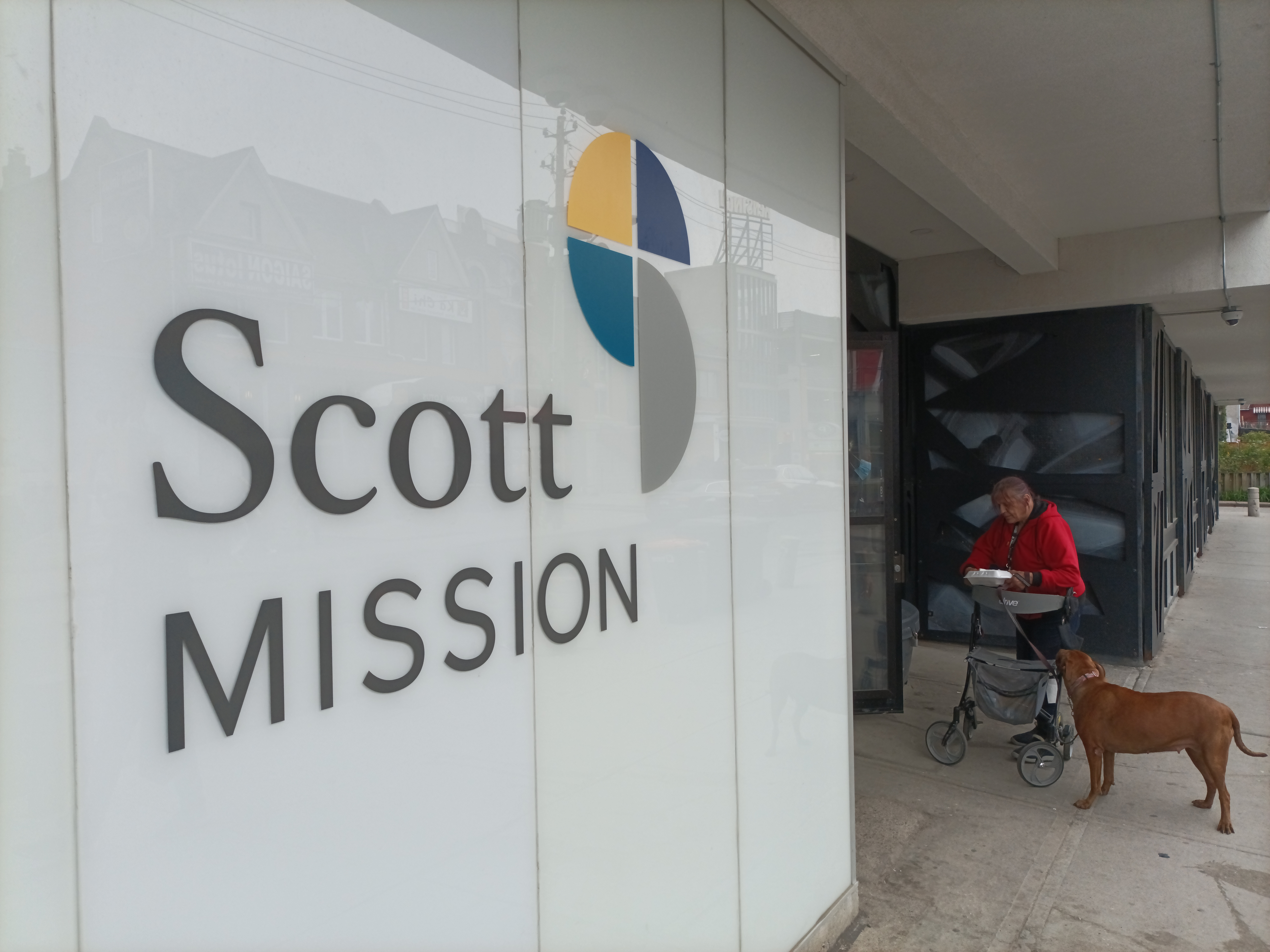
New The Scott Mission location in 2023

The Scott Mission has two locations in Toronto. At the temporary location at 346 Spadina Avenue, the Mission offers hot meals, overnight shelter for 45-50 men each night, shower and laundry facilities, a food and clothing bank, Bible study groups, and fellowship activities. The Mission opened the O'Connor Family Centre in May 2013, at 1550 O'Connor Drive, designed to serve families in the east end of Toronto. They offer a Christian Childcare Centre, food and clothing bank, youth programs, and a variety of resources for families.

The Mission also has a lodge in Collingwood, Ontario, that is used as a retreat centre away from the city. The Lodge is located on 113 acres (46 ha) on the Blue Mountain overlooking Georgian Bay, and was a gift to the Mission in honour of founder Rev. Morris Zeidman.

The group owns a 100-acre (40 ha) campground in Caledon, Ontario, about a 45-minute drive north of Toronto. In the summer, around 600 children and youth from low-income neighbourhoods attend The Scott Mission's camp.

== Funding ==
The Mission spends about $8,000,000 per year, including capital projects. This covers the cost for 160 full-time and part-time staff plus all of the costs associated with providing services for tens of thousands of needy people every year.

The Mission is funded through three main sources: donations from private individuals, businesses and foundations; bequest income; and investment income. Less than 10 per cent of the Mission's revenues come from government.

== History ==
The Scott Mission is named after Zeidman's mentor, Presbyterian minister J. McPherson Scott (1859–1920), who founded the Presbyterian Mission to the Jews, known as the Christian Synagogue, in 1908, in an effort to evangelise and convert Jewish immigrants who had settled in The Ward district of Toronto. Scott appointed Rev. Shebetai Benjamin Rohold, a Jewish convert to Presbyterianism as the superintendent of the Mission, which was located at 56 Terauley Street (now Bay Street) in 'The Ward.' The mission provided free medical care, English classes, employment and other services in the impoverished neighborhood, as well as gospel classes. The proselytizing was controversial and a riot occurred in 1911 when, "a crowd of "hundreds of enraged residents hurled stones and debris" at Reverend Rohold while he was engaging in street preaching at the corner of Elizabeth Street and what is now Dundas Street.

The mission, while providing social services to a large number of people, had a very low rate of success in converting Jews. One of these converts, Rev. Morris Zeidman, was appointed the new superintendent of the Presbyterian Mission to the Jews in 1920, following Scott's death and Rohold's decision to return to Jerusalem. Zeidman renamed the mission the Scott Institute in Scott's honour. During the Great Depression the Institute operated a soup kitchen that served 1,000 men a day.

Zeidman wished to refocus the mandate of the institute to alleviating poverty and serving the broader community while the church wished it to continue its evangelical focus on proselytizing Jews. Zeidman resigned in 1942 and founded the current Scott Mission as a non-denominational urban Mission providing community services.

== See also ==
- Homelessness in Canada
