= M. v. H. =

Supreme Court of Canada case on same-sex couples

M v H
- Supreme Court of Canada

Hearing: March 18, 1998 Judgment: May 20, 1999
- Full case name: The Attorney General for Ontario v. M. and H.
- Citations: [1999] 2 S.C.R. 3; 171 D.L.R. (4th) 577; 46 R.F.L. (4th) 32; 238 N.R. 179; AZ-50065792; E.Y.B. 1999-12460; J.E. 99-1064; [1999] S.C.J. No 23 (QL); 121 O.A.C. 1; [1999] A.C.S. no 23; 62 C.R.R. (2d) 1
- Ruling: Appeal and cross-appeal dismissed, remedy modified

Holding
- Section 29 of the Family Law Act is declared of no force or effect. The effect of that declaration is temporarily suspended for a period of six months.

Court membership
- Chief Justice: Antonio Lamer; Puisne Justices: Claire L'Heureux-Dubé, Charles Gonthier, Peter Cory, Beverley McLachlin, Frank Iacobucci, John C. Major, Michel Bastarache, Ian Binnie

Reasons given
- Majority: Cory and Iacobucci JJ., joined by Lamer C.J. and L'Heureux-Dubé, McLachlin, and Binnie JJ.
- Concurrence: Major J.
- Concurrence: Bastarache J.
- Dissent: Gonthier J.

M. v. H. [1999] 2 S.C.R. 3, is a landmark decision of the Supreme Court of Canada on the rights of cohabiting same-sex couples to equal treatment under the law. The court found that the definition of spouse in section 29 of Ontario's Family Law Act, which extended spousal support rights to unmarried cohabiting opposite-sex couples but not same-sex couples, was discriminatory and therefore unconstitutional under section 15 of the Canadian Charter of Rights and Freedoms.

== Background ==
M. v. H. was on the appeal of a case originally brought by a lesbian couple, Joanne Mitchell ("M") and Lorraine McFarland ("H"). The initials belonged to their lawyers.

On May 19, 1999, Justice Gloria Epstein—who was, at that time, of the Ontario Superior Court of Justice—ruled that the exclusion of same-sex couples from the definition of common-law spouse under section 29 of the Ontario Family Law Act was in violation of equality rights under section 15(1) of the Canadian Charter of Rights and Freedoms, and could not be justified under section 1 of the Charter, which allows only "such reasonable limits prescribed by law as can be demonstrably justified in a free and democratic society." The ruling was appealed by Ontario Premier Mike Harris to the Court of Appeal for Ontario, which upheld the ruling, and then to the Supreme Court.

== Ruling ==
According to the Supreme Court's ruling,

the nature of the interest protected by s. 29 of the FLA is fundamental. The exclusion of same-sex partners from the benefits of s. 29 promotes the view that M., and individuals in same-sex relationships generally, are less worthy of recognition and protection. It implies that they are judged to be incapable of forming intimate relationships of economic interdependence as compared to opposite-sex couples, without regard to their actual circumstances. Such exclusion perpetuates the disadvantages suffered by individuals in same‑sex relationships and contributes to the erasure of their existence.

This ruling did not affect the legal definition of marriage, and applied only to cohabiting partners in a common-law marriage, who have significantly fewer rights than married spouses in some areas, especially relating to division of property upon separation.

As a remedy, the court struck down section 29 altogether rather than read in any necessary changes, but the ruling was suspended for six months to give the province time to change it. The section was subsequently amended by the Legislative Assembly of Ontario to include all common-law spouses, whether same-sex or different-sex.

According to R. Douglas Elliott, one of the lawyers in the case, the ruling dealt "a body blow to discrimination" in Canada: "This important decision found that it was constitutionally imperative under the Canadian Charter for laws to provide equal treatment of same-sex common-law couples and opposite-sex common-law couples. . . . [The Supreme Court] called upon the lawmakers of Canada to rectify all Canadian laws, rather than force gays and lesbians to resort to the Courts.

== See also ==
- List of Supreme Court of Canada cases (Lamer Court)
- Same-sex marriage in Canada
