= Ron Rosenes =

Canadian HIV activist

Ron (Ronald) Rosenes was an HIV/AIDS activist and recipient of the Order of Canada. Rosenes became involved in gay rights activism after a bathhouse raid (part of Operation Soap) in February 1981. He was diagnosed with HIV in 1987. He began working with the AIDS Committee of Toronto and became the board chair. He was later the chairman of the board of directors for the HIV Legal Network, where he worked on HIV criminalization and access to medication. He also worked for the Community Advisory Committee of the Canadian Institute for Health Research (CIHR), the African and Caribbean Council on HIV/AIDS in Ontario (ACCHO), the Canadian Aboriginal AIDS Network and the Ontario AIDS Network. He also worked for HQ Toronto, which named the Ron Rosenes Room for counselling for him. Rosenes also worked for the Ontario HIV Treatment Network for over a decade.

In May 2014, he was awarded the Order of Canada for "improving access to health care and social justice resources for people living with HIV and AIDS through his advocacy, fundraising and community leadership." In 2018, he gave an interview to CBC's The Current about his experiences living and aging with AIDS.

He continued to be deeply involved in many Ontario HIV/AIDS organizations until his death in 2023 at the age of 76.
