= Pauline Dakin =

Canadian journalist (born 1965)

- Born: 1965 (age 60–61)
- Occupation: Journalist
- Awards: Edna Staebler Award (2018)

Pauline Dakin (born 1965) is a Canadian journalist. She is most noted for her non-fiction book Run, Hide, Repeat: A Memoir of a Fugitive Childhood, which won the Edna Staebler Award for creative non-fiction writing in 2018.

A former producer of radio and television current affairs programming for CBC News operations in Nova Scotia, she left that role in 2016 to become a professor and associate director in the journalism program at the University of King's College.

Run, Hide, Repeat, published in 2017, is a memoir of her childhood experience of moving frequently with her mother after her parents' separation; although the moves were not explained at the time, she was told in her early 20s that her father had been involved in organized crime, and that the moves had taken place because the family was involved in witness protection. Several years later, after nursing suspicions that the story did not add up, she concocted a story that her home had been broken into in order to test how her mother would react to the news, and thus learned the actual truth that her family had never been in danger, and instead the moves took place entirely because Stan Sears, her mother's new boyfriend after her parents' breakup, suffered from delusional disorder.
