= Family Law Act (Ontario) =

Ontario, Canada statute

The Family Law Act (French: Loi sur le droit de la famille) is a statute passed by the Legislature of Ontario in 1986, regulating the rights of spouses and dependants in regard to property, support, inheritance, prenuptial agreements, separation agreements, and other matters of family law. In 1999, this statute was the subject of a watershed ruling in M. v. H. by the Supreme Court of Canada that established the equality of spousal rights for same-sex couples under Canadian law.

== Content ==
According to the Preamble, the purpose of the law is "to encourage and strengthen the role of the family; ... to recognize the equal position of spouses as individuals within marriage and to recognize marriage as a form of partnership; ... to provide in law for the orderly and equitable settlement of the affairs of the spouses upon the breakdown of the partnership, and to provide for other mutual obligations in family relationships, including the equitable sharing by parents of responsibility for their children".

The law covers the following subjects relating to marriage and common-law marriage in the province of Ontario:

- Part I—Family Property (sections 4–16)
- Part II—Matrimonial Home (sections 17–28)
- Part III—Support Obligations (sections 29–49)
- Part IV—Domestic Contracts (sections 51–60)
- Part V—Dependants’ Claim for Damages (sections 61–63)
- Part VI—Amendments to the Common Law (sections 64–67)

== Section 29 ==
The Act has been amended numerous times since its enactment and has been modified by court rulings, most notably in the case of M. v. H. by the Supreme Court of Canada on May 19, 1999. In that historic ruling, the court held that the equality provisions of Section Fifteen of the Canadian Charter of Rights and Freedoms require that the rights and benefits of common-law relationship be extended to same-sex couples as well as to different-sex couples.

In particular, the court struck down section 29 of the Act as being unconstitutional in its definition of spouse, which was restricted to heterosexual couples. The original 1990 wording of the section included this definition:

"spouse" means a spouse as defined in subsection 1 (1) [i.e., "either of two persons who are married to each other"], and in addition includes either of a man and woman who are not married to each other and have cohabited ... continuously for a period of not less than three years.

The person(s) may not be married to another person simultaneously or the subsequent spousal relationship is void or voidable. According to the Supreme Court's ruling,

the nature of the interest protected by s. 29 of the FLA is fundamental. The exclusion of same-sex partners from the benefits of s. 29 promotes the view that M., and individuals in same-sex relationships generally, are less worthy of recognition and protection. It implies that they are judged to be incapable of forming intimate relationships of economic interdependence as compared to opposite-sex couples, without regard to their actual circumstances. Such exclusion perpetuates the disadvantages suffered by individuals in same‑sex relationships and contributes to the erasure of their existence.

According to one of the attorneys in the M. v. H. case, the ruling dealt "a body blow to discrimination" in Canada. Although the ruling applied specifically only to the Ontario law, the constitutional principles declared by the court had far-reaching implications for all other provinces in their treatment of same-sex couples' rights.

Although the Court declared section 29 unconstitutional and thus unenforceable, the ruling was stayed for six months to give the province time to amend the law. Subsequently, the Legislature revised the definition of "spouse" in section 29 to include "either of two persons who are not married to each other and have cohabited," thus applying equally to common-law partners of the same sex or different sexes. Federal criminal code law against polygamy prohibits family court recognition or sanctioning of any form of subsequent marriage(s) whilst one or both persons are married to another person.

Nevertheless, section 29 applies only to the provisions of Part III of the law, which deals with spousal support, child support, and child custody. This ruling did not affect the legal definition of marriage, and applies only to cohabiting partners in a common-law relationship, who have significantly fewer rights than married spouses in some areas, especially relating to division of property upon separation.

== See also ==
- Family Law Act (Alberta)
