= Death of Alloura Wells =

2017 death of a Canadian transgender woman

Alloura Wells
- Born: 1989 or 1990; Toronto, Ontario, Canada
- Disappeared: July 2017; Downtown Toronto
- Died: 26 July 2017 (estimated) (aged 27); Rosedale Ravine Lands Park, Toronto
- Body discovered: 5 August 2017
- Other names: Alloura Hennessy; Alloura Wheeler

Alloura Wells (a.k.a. Alloura Hennessy and Alloura Wheeler) was a Canadian transgender mixed-race woman who died in Toronto in July 2017. Her body was discovered in a ravine the following month, but she was not reported missing until 6 November 2017, and her badly decomposed body was not identified until 23 November.

Wells's death brought attention to a marginalized community and brought criticisms against the Toronto Police Service (TPS) and The 519 community centre over mismanagement of information. Internal and external reviews were called by both organizations over their policies and accusations of bias against transgender peoples. The case, along with a series of deaths of missing people in Church and Wellesley, Toronto's gay village, prompted the TPS to create a dedicated missing-persons unit.

== Biography ==
Wells was the third of four children in a Toronto family, which struggled financially and relied on the income of her mother, Mary, who was employed as a manager at Tim Hortons and her father, Mike, as a labourer. Wells was enrolled in a specialized drama program at Wexford Collegiate School for the Arts and came out to her family when she was 18, who were supportive.

As a teenager, Wells would disappear for periods of time, often going downtown, where she was caught trying to sneak into bars in Church and Wellesley, Toronto's gay village. She befriended drag performers and questioned them about dressing up and becoming "glam".

Around 2012, Wells signed up for the Ontario Works income-support program and rented an apartment in Scarborough near her sister. In February 2013, her mother died leading to the family to break apart, as her father and older brother became homeless and Wells was evicted. From the time of her eviction, she mainly lived in a tent in the Rosedale Ravine Lands Park. Around 2015, Wells was once found sleeping on her sister's doorstep, disheveled and almost unrecognizable.

Wells had many friends according to Monica Forrester, a transgender and sex-work activist, who described Wells as a "staple of the community". According to Forrester, Wells had fallen on hard times, could not afford housing, and lived under a bridge. Wells had served short jail terms at the Vanier Centre for Women, which her father believed were for theft and breaking and entering. Wells's father said that she had been engaged in sex work and had turned down offers to stay at his apartment. Friends of Wells clarified that she would occasionally engage in survival sex work when necessary. Wells and her father had last spoken in March 2017.

Wells was in a romantic relationship with Augustinus Balesdent, the only boyfriend Wells had introduced to her father, however, he described their relationship as "tumultuous" and marked with use of intravenous drugs.

Her Facebook account, under the name Alloura Hennessy, went dormant after 26 July 2017. Of the last two posts, one expressed pride in her younger brother's military service and the other read: "Is wondering [what] happened to me life love loss its to much to handle right now."

== Unidentified body ==
On 5 August 2017, a woman named Rebecca Price and a friend discovered a dead woman's body in Rosedale Ravine Lands Park in midtown Toronto. She informed the Toronto Police Service (TPS) and an on-scene investigation was conducted by 53 Division investigators and the coroner. The body was found beside a tent with drug paraphernalia; there was no identification. The body was fully dressed in women's clothing and was found with a blonde wig and a purse; there was no indication of foul play. An autopsy was unable to determine a cause of death or race, though the coroner determined that the woman was transgender. The body had badly decomposed, with the time of death estimated at three to four weeks before its discovery.

The TPS did not issue a news release when the body was found, which is standard procedure. According to police spokesperson Meaghan Gray, there were no details that could be released and investigators worked to establish more information so that they could appeal to the public for assistance in an identification.

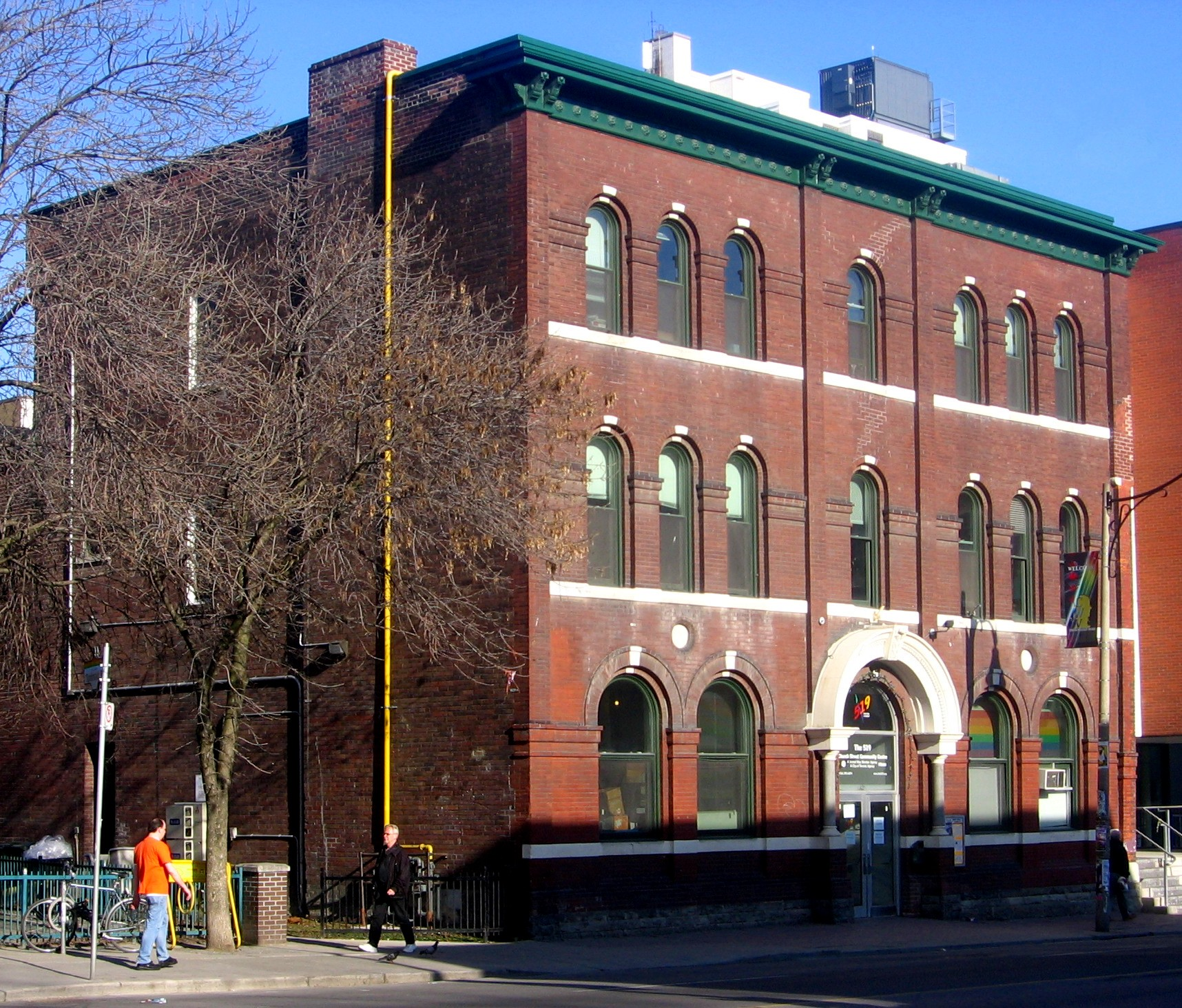
The 519 community centre

Price spoke with a detective several times but realized little progress was being made. Learning that the woman was transgender from the detective, Price searched on the internet for transgender-advocacy organizations and contacted The 519 community centre in Church and Wellesley on 17 August. On 25 August, The 519 informed Price that staff would investigate and follow up with police. It was later revealed, however, that staff only reviewed police news releases and when they found no mention of an unidentified body, they did not contact the police or any other agency.

In mid-August, TPS sent out a bulletin to other police services. The Ontario Provincial Police alerted the TPS to a missing transgender person from Northern Ontario, but the age of that missing person did not correlate with the body discovered in Toronto. Another case from Alberta was closer in age, but was ruled out by DNA testing.

== Alloura Wells's disappearance ==
At the beginning of August, Maggie's: Toronto Sex Workers Action Project (Maggie's), an advocacy group that Forrester worked with, was in touch with Wells's family. They were concerned that she had stopped posting on Facebook. Forrester contacted the Vanier Centre for Women and learned they had a prisoner named Wheeler, which she thought was Wells's surname, and assumed that Wells was safe.

In late October or early November, Forrester checked again with the Vanier Centre and learned that Wells had not been in prison that summer. Forrester informed Wells's father and later his other daughter informed him that Wells was not in a drug rehabilitation centre. Wells's father filed a missing-persons report with police on 6 November 2017, four months after she had disappeared. He reported her missing to 51 Division, which covered Church and Wellesley. On 8 November, TPS issued a news release of Wells's disappearance with two photographs of her. Officers returned to the ravine on 9 and 10 November to search for Wells.

Price learned of Wells's disappearance after Maggie's alerted the media, and both were shocked that neither TPS nor The 519 had contacted Maggie's or other social agencies working in the area. Police saw similarities between the missing persons report and the body found in the ravine and obtained a DNA sample from a family member for testing.

On 11 November, Maggie's organized a search of the ravine and along Bloor Street East where Wells was often seen.

Wells's body was not easily identifiable and required months of forensics work with DNA testing by the Ontario Centre of Forensic Sciences. The body was positively identified as Wells's on 23 November.

== Continuing investigation ==
Police sought to find Augustinus Balesdent, Wells's transient boyfriend, who was believed to be the last person to see Wells in July and was identified as a person of interest. Balesdent was a transient in his late 20s or early 30s at the time of Wells's death.

== Controversies ==
=== TPS handling of missing persons ===
The TPS receives over 4,000 missing-persons reports each year, but it faces staffing shortages of frontline officers, which an anonymous staff sergeant described as "dangerously low". Mark Mendelson, a former TPS homicide detective, stated that the circumstances surrounding a disappearance determine the priority of a missing persons case. Whether uniformed officers become involved in a physical search depends on whether police suspect foul play, noting that it is a "big step" to begin a search, especially for an adult.

Wells's father has alleged that TPS told them the case was "not high priority" when he reported Wells missing, given her homelessness. TPS Detective Barry Radford noted that homelessness raised concerns of where to begin a search, the reliability of information regarding the person's last known whereabouts, and factors such as weather and the person's mental state, history, and health.

On 11 November, Forrester criticized TPS for overlooking Wells's disappearance. At that time, (Note: In the 5 days since Wells was reported missing by her father.) TPS had issued a news release, conducted two searches of the ravine, and initiated testing to determine if the body was Wells's.

Friends of Wells also criticized TPS for not publicizing information about the discovery of her body earlier. There has been a growing shift in policy across Canadian police forces to not release details about deaths and murders in response to new privacy laws that require police "to protect the privacy rights of the victims and their families", however, members of the public and other Canadian police forces chastised these policies.

TPS Chief Mark Saunders apologized to Wells's father and ordered the professional standards unit to conduct an internal review of how the missing-persons report was handled.

Criticism of the TPS's handling of Wells's death came at a time when murders in the Church and Wellesley neighbourhood were being criticized for being mismanaged. The day before the announcement of the identification of Wells's body, Tess Richey was found strangled to death in an alley in Church and Wellesley. The two deaths and a string of unsolved disappearances in the neighbourhood caused an uproar, with some fearing serial killer. While TPS initially stated in December 2017 that there was "no evidence" of this possibility, however, in January 2018 Bruce MacArthur was charged with the murders of five men and later plead guilty to the murders of eight men. In late February 2018, Saunders recommended an external review of how TPS handled missing persons cases in light of allegations of systematic bias and in March established a dedicated missing persons unit. Saunders also pledged to work more closely with the LGBT community in the future and try to rebuild trust with the community.

=== The 519 ===
Wells's death also brought criticism to The 519 community centre, Toronto's leading LGBT advocacy agency, which failed to follow-through with Price's report of a transgender body being discovered. Wells's friends said that this resulted in her body being unidentified for months.

Maura Lawless, The 519's executive director, initially said that the centre "made some effort to verify the information with the police". The 519 later stated that they could not verify the information provided by Price and did not want to cause unnecessary panic. An internal review found that staff did not contact police or any other agency and only scanned police news releases for mention of an unidentified body. The 519 posted an apology on its website on 12 December for their "mishandling of information" that 519 board chair David Morris referred to as a "comedy of errors". However, they continued to place the full blame on TPS.

Trans people have had a history of being stigmatized within the broader queer community. Forrester, who worked for The 519 for 10 years before moving to Maggie's, expressed outrage at The 519 for failing to advocate for trans women. In December, Forrester, along with former-519 employees Lynda Cheng and Brian De Matos, circulated a petition demanding Lawless's resignation. The petition alleged that under Lawless's direction, The 519 had been systematically "pushing out the most marginalized people in the community" and turning the centre into an exclusive club for wealthy donors in the increasingly gentrified neighbourhood. Their main allegations were that The 519 was prejudiced against transgender women, the poor, and the homeless. They cited The 519's mishandling of the report of Wells's body and redevelopment plans for More Moss Park that would displace low-income and homeless people. The petitioners also alleged that The 519 had contributed to tensions by discouraging sex workers and the homeless from the area, and that The 519 had a "ban list largely made up of mentally ill or developmentally disabled racialized people". Staff disputed these allegations and The 519 board of directors supported Lawless while engaging an independent review of the petition's concerns.

== Vigils and memorials ==
After Price learned that the unidentified body she found would not receive a memorial service, she laid flowers at the site of the body's discovery.

On 19 November, members of Trans Pride Toronto and Maggie's organized a vigil for the then-unidentified transgender woman at Barbara Hall Park in Church and Wellesley. Following the vigil approximately 100 people marched to TPS headquarters to demand accountability.

A public memorial for Wells was held in the second week of December.

On 12 December 2017, the Ontario legislature enacted into law that 20 November would be observed as an annual Transgender Day of Remembrance, requiring a minute of silence in the legislature. MPP Cheri DiNovo, who introduced the private member's bill in 2016, said that the legislation would be a memorial to Wells.

On 27 February, Forrester created a GoFundMe page to raise money toward Wells's burial and tombstone. The City of Toronto covered the cremation expense and surplus funds were planned to help finance a monthly support group to assist homeless transgender women. By mid-March, the effort had raised over $100,000, some of which went toward expenses for members of Wells's family and Wells's funeral service.

== See also ==
- 2010–2017 Toronto serial homicides
- List of solved missing person cases (post-2000)
- Murder of Tess Richey
