= Fenelon River =

Coordinates: 44°32′06″N 78°44′08″W

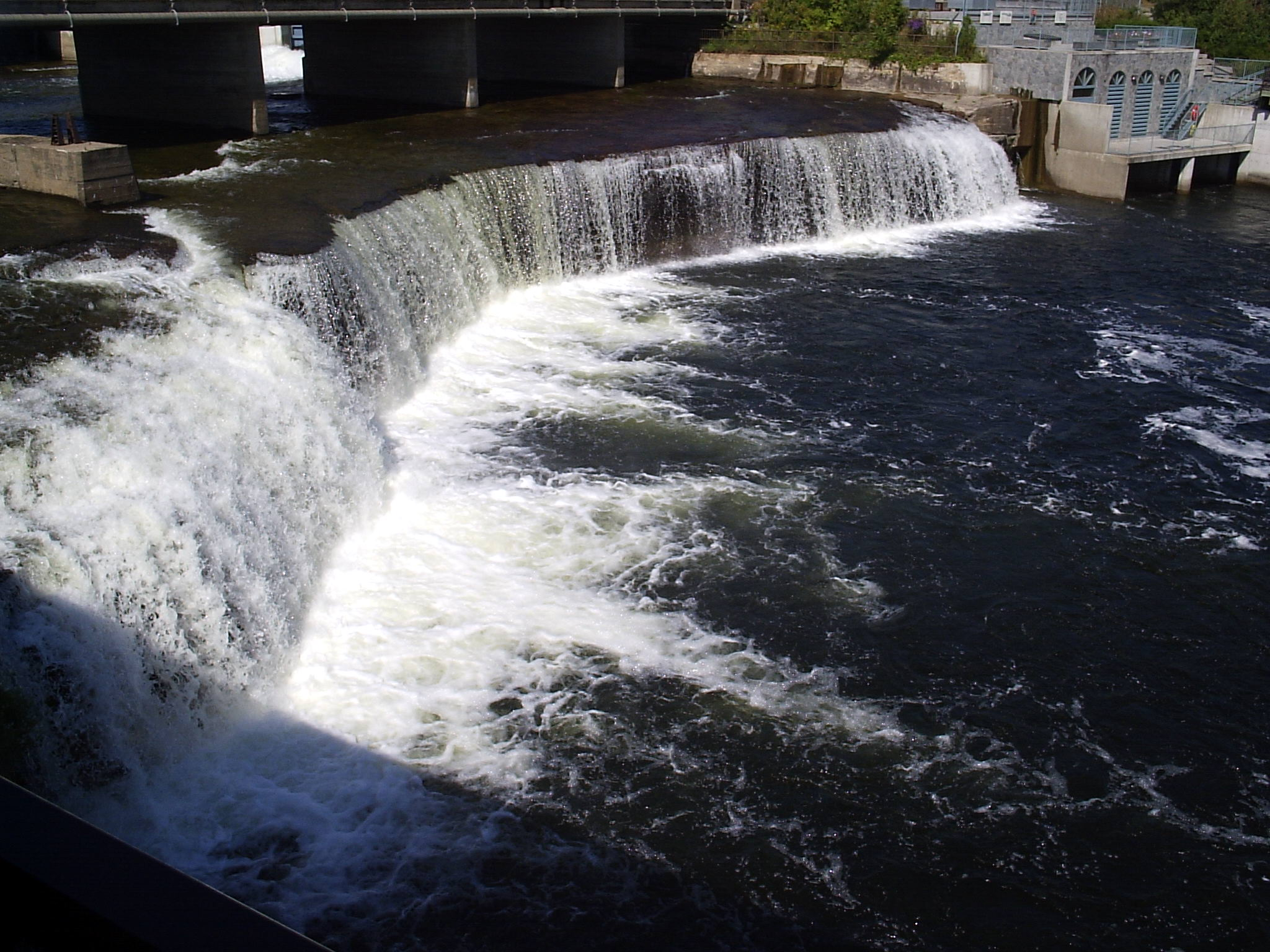
- Fenelon Falls on the Fenelon River

Location
- Country: Canada
- Province: Ontario

Physical characteristics
- Source
  - location: Cameron Lake
- Mouth
  - location: Sturgeon Lake
  - elevation: 246 m (807 ft)
- Length: 2 km (1.2 mi)

The Fénelon River is a 2 km (1.2 mi) long river that runs through the community of Fenelon Falls, City of Kawartha Lakes in the Kawartha Lakes district of Ontario, Canada. It connects Cameron Lake to Sturgeon Lake.

== See also ==
- List of rivers of Ontario
