= The Kents (band) =

Canadian rock band

- Origin: Lindsay, Ontario, Canada
- Genres: Indie pop, rock
- Years active: 2011 - present
- Members: Warren Frank (vocals), Luke Shauf (bass), Freddy Kwon (guitar), Tanner Paré (drums)
- Past members: Nathan Truax
- Website: www.thekentsband.com

The Kents are a Canadian rock band formed in 2011 in Lindsay, Ontario. The band's current lineup consists of Warren Frank (vocals), Luke Shauf (bass), Freddy Kwon (guitar), and Tanner Paré (drums). They have released three EPs: 2014's Locals, 2016's Waking, and 2017's Within Waves. The band describe their sound as "indie pop in the vein of...Foster The People, Young the Giant and The Arkells." They have toured with and opened for other Canadian acts such as The Sheepdogs and The Strumbellas and have been featured on curated playlists on Spotify and Apple Music.

== History ==
Frank, Kwon, and Shauf were students at I. E. Weldon Secondary School and were brought together through a group assignment in their Grade 11 music class in which they had to cover various songs. After realizing their shared musical chemistry, the trio, alongside drummer Nathan Truax, decided to form a band, which they originally named Luke and the Good Men. In 2012, they changed their name to The Kents, a reference to the name of Lindsay's main street, Kent Street.

The band first gained attention through playing local shows and community events in the Kawartha Lakes area before going on hiatus in order for each member to pursue their respective educations, though they still recorded and self-released the Locals EP when they regrouped in the summer of 2014. After finishing their studies, they reunited once more in 2016 to record a new EP, Waking. By this point, Truax had parted ways with the band and had been replaced by Peterborough drummer Tanner Paré. Waking's first single, "The Stakes", received significant airplay on CBC Radio and garnered over 100,000 streams on Spotify before the EP was released. The Waking was released on July 1, 2016 and was covered in regional and national music publications, like Canadian Beats and Exclaim!, the latter of which writing that the EP "bristles with high-energy power-pop from the get-go". Its songs have collectively been streamed over 6,000,000 times on Spotify.

In 2017, the Kents released the single "Is There Anyone?" ahead of their second EP, Within Waves. The EP's second single, "Distant", was released September 18, 2017 and was "[inspired by] a trip to Canada's East Coast", according to Frank. "Distant" was played on FM and satellite radio stations, like BOB FM, Toronto's Indie88, and Sirius XM. The EP itself was released on October 13, 2017 and garnered similar attention from media outlets as Waking. Matt Yuyitung of Exclaim! gave EP an 8/10 rating, noting that the band's "sound palette has grown considerably [since Waking]—and so have their songwriting capabilities and confidence as a band". He particularly praised Frank's vocals on the EP, calling him "one of the band's biggest assets on the record". The band performed at Peterborough Musicfest in 2017 and were a part of the 2018 edition of Canadian Music Week.

In January 2020, the Kents changed their name to "Heaps" as announced via their official band webpage.
