= Lake Scugog =

Lake in southern Ontario, Canada

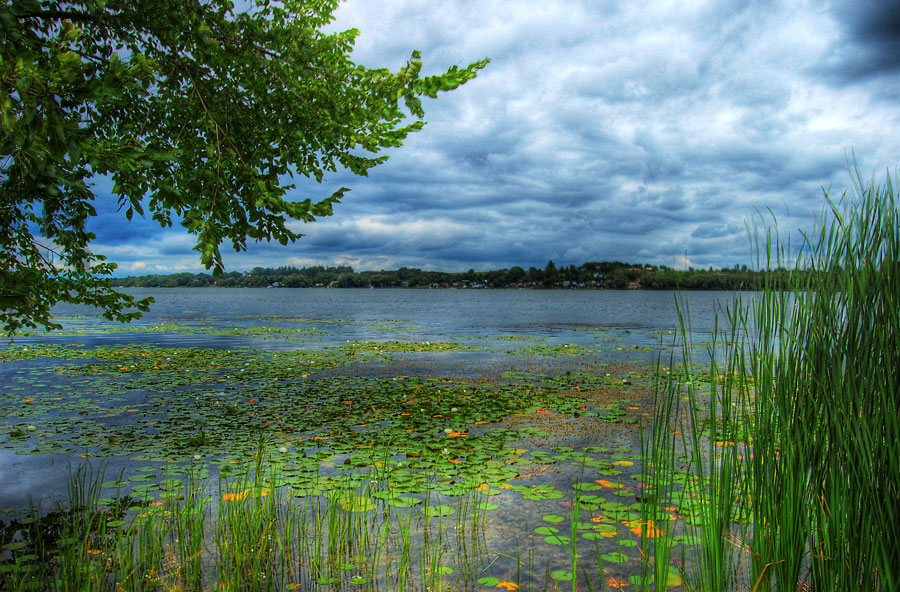
- Lake Scugog near Port Perry

- Location in southern Ontario
- Location: Durham Region & Kawartha Lakes, Ontario
- Group: Kawartha Lakes
- Coordinates: 44°11′00″N 78°51′26″W
- Type: Artificial, eutrophic
- Part of: Great Lakes Basin
- Primary inflows: Nonquon River, Blackstock Creek, Cawkers Creek
- Primary outflows: Scugog River
- Catchment area: 529 square kilometres (204 sq mi)
- Basin countries: Canada
- Surface area: 68 square kilometres (26 sq mi)
- Average depth: 1.4 metres (4 ft 7 in)
- Max. depth: 7.6 metres (24 ft 11 in)
- Water volume: 0.0957 cubic kilometres (0.0230 cu mi)
- Shore length^{1}: 172 kilometres (107 mi)
- Surface elevation: 249.9 metres (819 ft 11 in)
- Islands: Scugog Island
- Settlements: Port Perry, Lindsay
- ^{1} Shore length is not a well-defined measure.

Lake Scugog is an artificially flooded lake in Scugog, Regional Municipality of Durham and the unitary city of Kawartha Lakes in central Ontario, Canada. It lies between the communities of Port Perry and Lindsay. The lake has been raised and lowered several times over its history. Though not technically part of the Kawartha lakes due to its shallow depths, it is often geographically linked to them. Its sole outflow, the Scugog River, connects to Sturgeon Lake. Lake Scugog is in the Great Lakes Basin and forms part of the Trent–Severn Waterway.

== Etymology ==
The name "Scugog" may be an Ojibwe word meaning "marshy waters". However, according to Place Names of Ontario by Alan Rayburn, Scugog is a Mississauga word meaning 'waves leap over a canoe' in reference, perhaps, to the flooding of the river valley, or, more likely, the quickness that waves can be whipped up in winds, owing to its shallowness.

== Geography ==
A map of the city of Kawartha Lakes, with Lake Scugog highlighted in orange.

With 68 km² with an average depth of 1.4 metres, Lake Scugog is amongst the largest five lakes of the Kawarthas by surface area. It is also the shallowest, alongside Mitchell Lake It is fed by the Blackstock and Cawkers Creeks and the Nonquon River, as well as by many small unnamed tributaries. The Scugog River is the only outflow from the lake, flowing into Sturgeon Lake which drains through the Trent watershed. Other communities surrounding the lake include Seagrave, Port Perry, View Lake and Caesarea. Scugog Island (whose island status is debatable due to the south-western edge being a seasonally flooded swamp) lay in the centre of the lake.

A 2.58 km^{2} (1.00 mi^{2}) Mississaugian Indian Reserve of about 50 residents exists on Scugog Island, and includes the Great Blue Heron Casino, amongst the many seasonal cottagers on the island and around the lake.

== Hydrology ==
It is a hard-water marl-producing lake, and the lake bottom consists of deep deposits of it. This gives the lake a murky appearance in warm weather, especially during the summer. The lake is reportedly filling in with this marl by about 1 millimetre per year.

In dry summer weather, the Scugog River ceases to flow out of the lake, and its tributary streams of Mariposa Brook and East Cross Creek flow backward into the lake via the river to offset the high evaporative losses off the lake and marsh surfaces.

== History ==
The lake has had a history of water level changes. Originally, it was essentially two lakes connected via a broad channel flowing through a marshy area along the north end. The lake was flooded approximately ten feet when William Purdy and his sons dammed the Scugog River at Lindsay (Upstream from the current dam and locks) in 1834 to power his grist mill. During this period of high water levels through the 1930s, today's so-called islands of Washburn, Nonquon (now Seven Mile), Ball, Platten, and the enormous centrally located Scugog came into existence as islands. Today, these form part of the mainland, with the exception of Scugog Island, which is generally maintained as an island by man-made channels around the swampy south end of the island.

The stagnant waters of the lake caused a wave of deadly fevers in the surrounding farms, and the new lake limits quickly became very unpopular with the local residents. On one day in the summer of 1838, settlers from the countryside surrounding the lake rose up and using axes, flintlocks and pitchforks, tore the dam apart, lowering the lake once more. No charges were laid due to the general anger towards the water height by residents, and because of a deal reached between Purdy and the Board of Works of the Province of Canada, on December 18, 1843. Mr. Purdy was forced to lower the elevation to something approximating its natural maximum spring high-water level, a reduction in the height of the previous dam by about three feet. The Board of Works constructed the dam and a lock for navigation into Lake Scugog, which was completed in 1844 and included a log flume. In exchange, Purdy relinquished all claims against the damage done by residents, and maintained the dam and flume.

== Natural history ==
The original body of water consisted of the upper sections of the current lake and was more ideally a shallow marsh than an actual lake.

The marshes of the lake prior to flooding were filled with wild rice stands and cranberries harvested by the native Mississaugas. The flooding of the lakes contributed greatly to their destruction.

It is surrounded by swamps and marshes which provide ideal habitat for waterfowl and other wildlife.

Lake Scugog has an array of fish, including an abundant supply of largemouth bass, walleye, crappie, musky, perch, carp, catfish, rock bass, smallmouth bass and minnows. Due to a dwindling walleye population, there is no season to catch or keep walleye. It is a renowned fishing location in southern Ontario.

== Economy ==
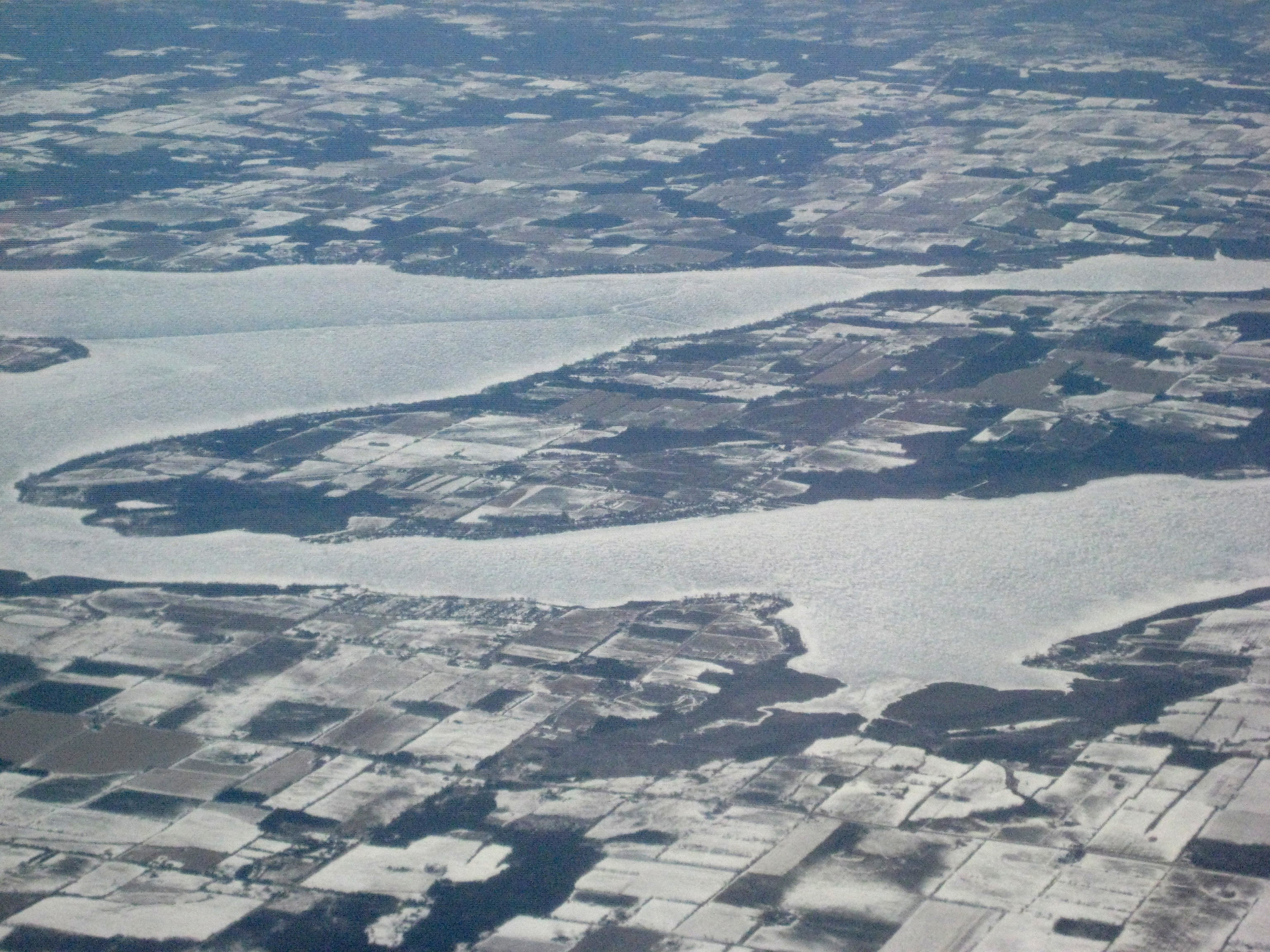
Lake Scugog seen from the air in winter

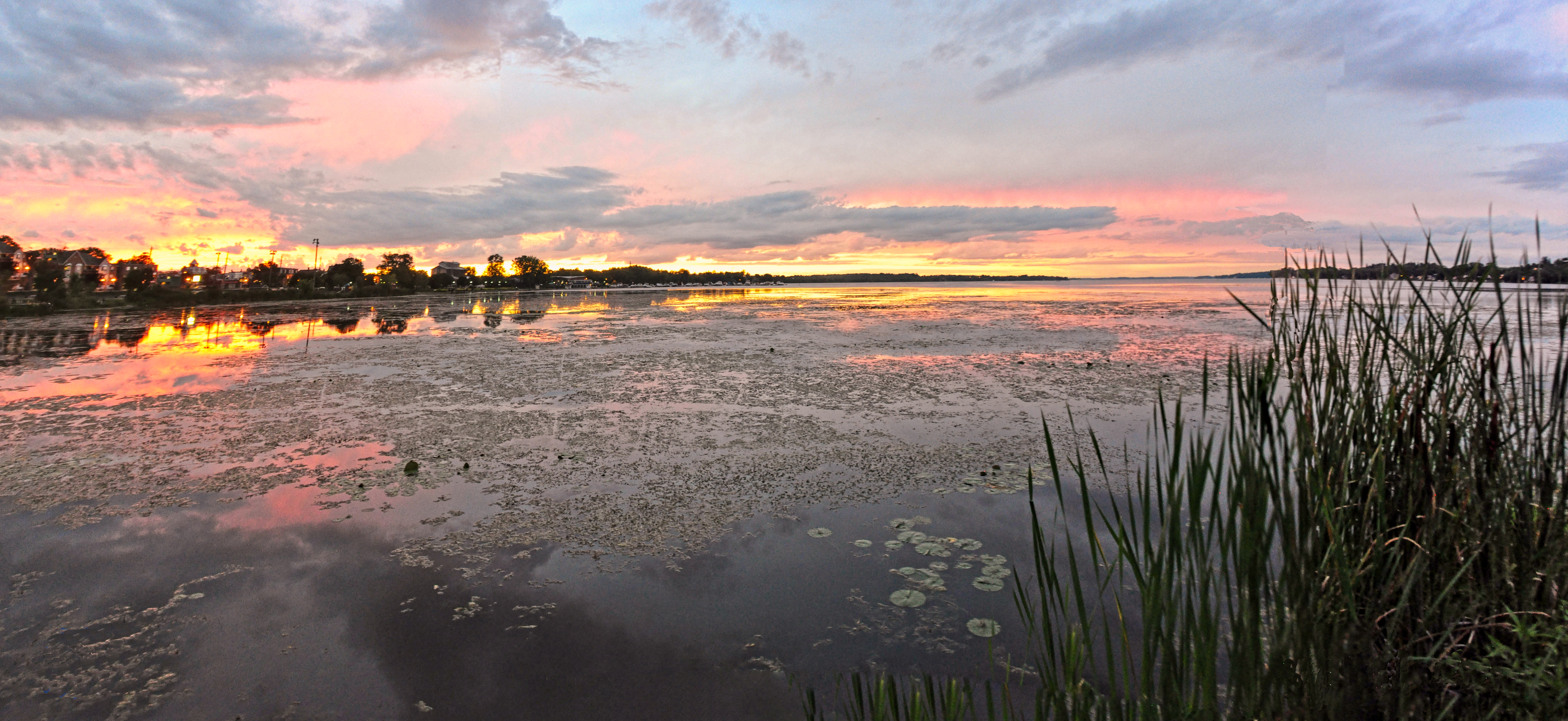
Sundown on the Lake Scugog

Like many of the lakes of southern Ontario, Scugog served for a time as a vessel for transporting logs downstream to Trenton in the early nineteenth century. This resource became quickly exhausted with the rapid sawing of pine in the area. The Trent Canal (Now the Trent-Severn Waterway) was constructed through Lindsay in late 1800s to facilitate steamboat travel to Sturgeon Lake and Lake Ontario as the boats were constructed in Port Perry.

Today, the lake is a tourist area, forming the southern boundary to "Cottage Country". The towns of Port Perry and Lindsay benefit from the recreational boating through the Trent-Severn Waterway by vacationers in the summer. Fishing is also a major attraction of the lake, as its shallow weed-filled bed is host to an abundance of species.

== Watershed ==
A list of rivers feeding to and from the lake:

- Nonquon River - flows from the southwest (near Utica) towards Seagrave. The river empties into Lake Scugog southeast of Seagrave.
- Cawkers Creek - flow from southwest end of Port Perry southwards for 16 km
- Mariposa Brook - also known as Big Creek, Black Creek, Davidson's Creek, and West Cross Creek begins in swamps near Manilla then flows northeast to then south past Little Britain and then east to empty into the Scugog River at Ops
- Blackstock Creek - found southeast of Lake Scugog between the Lake Scugog and East Cross Creek
- Scugog River

== Osler Marsh ==
The marsh on the lake along the Port Perry Causeway south of Port Perry, Ontario is named for Henry Smith Osler, who was one of the earlier owners of land which contains the marshes. The current marsh area covers 417 hectares (41,700 a) of wetlands.

== See also ==
- List of lakes in Ontario
