= Emsley =

Emsley is a surname. Notable people with the surname include:

- Clive Emsley (born 1944), British historian and criminologist
- Evangeline Lydia Emsley (1885–1967), Canadian nurse
- John Emsley, British writer, broadcaster and academic specialising in chemistry
- Lyndon Emsley (born 1964), British chemist
- Paul Emsley (born 1947), South African painter now resident in Wiltshire, England
- Richard Emsley (born 1951), British composer from Goole, Yorkshire

== See also ==
- Emsley A. Laney High School, high school just outside Wilmington, North Carolina
