= Rosedale River =

- Location of the mouth of the river in Southern Ontario
- Etymology: Named after named Rosa Dale

Location
- Country: Canada
- Province: Ontario
- Region: Central Ontario
- District: Kawartha Lakes
- City: Rosedale

Physical characteristics
- Source: Balsam Lake
  - coordinates: 44°34′24″N 78°47′46″W
  - elevation: 256.3 m (841 ft)
- Mouth: Cameron Lake
  - coordinates: 44°34′13″N 78°45′57″W
  - elevation: 254 m (833 ft)

Basin features
- River system: Great Lakes Basin

The Rosedale River is a river in the City of Kawartha Lakes in Central Ontario, Canada. It is in the Great Lakes Basin and is part of the Trent–Severn Waterway. The river is named after Rosa Dale, the wife of settler John Cameron, who first settled the area of nearby Fenelon Falls.

The river begins at the east side of Balsam Lake at the community of Rosedale. It flows east under Kawartha Lakes Road 35, then splits into two channels both heading to its mouth at the west side of Cameron Lake: a natural, winding, northern channel, and a southern cut canal, with lock 35 "Rosedale" of the Trent–Severn Waterway.
