= Hydrography of the Oak Ridges Moraine =

Preliminary research on the hydrology of the Oak Ridges Moraine began in the 1970s, but a broader research effort including the impact of urban development on the aquifer system and Great Lakes water quality was established in 1993. The research locus is the Geological Survey of Canada and the University of Toronto Groundwater Research Group, though other groups have made substantial contributions to this project.

The moraine serves to recharge streams and rivers in the surrounding region, acting as an underground reservoir. Rain and snow melt slowly soak into the moraine, being filtered and purified in its many sand and gravel aquifers. The cool, fresh water is discharged into the headwaters of streams and rivers which eventually flow into Lake Simcoe, Lake Scugog and Lake Ontario. The aquifers are also the water supply for some communities on the Moraine.

== Hydrogeology ==
The moraine's hydrological system is inter-twined with a regional flow system not bound by the morphological limits of the moraine. For this reason, environmentalists and researchers promote an aggressive protection strategy extending beyond the moraine, thus ensuring a contiguously protected hydrological system.

A number of features comprise the hydrological system of the Oak Ridges Moraine:

- permanent and ephemeral streams,
- wetlands,
- kettle lakes and ponds, and their catchment areas,
- seepage areas and springs, and
- aquifers and other recharge areas.

== Hydrology ==
The Oak Ridges Moraine's hydrological system is a major constituent of the Humber Watershed, so that any impact on this system will be of concern. A specific concern is urbanization, which affects water quality by increasing its load of metals and organic contaminants. A study by Cook et al. (1985) found an increase in mean annual runoff, instantaneous discharge, and hydrograph peak flow as a result of urbanization: "...changes in land use coincided with changes in volumetric and time distribution aspects of hydrologic response."

Numerous watersheds are linked to the Oak Ridges Moraine, and are managed by various organizations.

Watersheds linked to the Oak Ridges Moraine
Watershed	Conservation Authority
Nottawasaga River	Nottawasaga Valley Conservation Authority
Credit River	Credit Valley Conservation
Holland River	Lake Simcoe Region Conservation Authority
Black River	Lake Simcoe Region Conservation Authority
Pefferlaw Brook	Lake Simcoe Region Conservation Authority
Humber River	Toronto and Region Conservation Authority
Don River	Toronto and Region Conservation Authority
Rouge River	Toronto and Region Conservation Authority
Duffins Creek	Toronto and Region Conservation Authority
Nonquon River	Kawartha Conservation
Scugog River	Kawartha Conservation
Pigeon River	Kawartha Conservation
Lynde Creek	Central Lake Ontario Conservation Authority
Oshawa Creek	Central Lake Ontario Conservation Authority
Bowmanville and Soper Creeks	Central Lake Ontario Conservation Authority
Trout Creek	Otonabee Region Conservation Authority
Wilmot Creek	Ganaraska Region Conservation Authority
Ganaraska River	Ganaraska Region Conservation Authority
Gage Creek	Ganaraska Region Conservation Authority
Cobourg and Baltimore Creeks	Ganaraska Region Conservation Authority

(Note: the above table excludes watersheds managed by the Lower Trent Conservation Authority.)

== Conservation ==
The Oak Ridges Moraine Conservation Act of 2001 stipulates that any development in the moraine or nearby areas must satisfy several conditions, most prominently that each development leave a buffer zone of 30 m between it and any hydrological feature; for a kettle lake, this measure is from the edge of the lake's catchment area.

The Act specifically required that each municipality, single-tier and upper-tier, must have commenced preparations for a watershed plan before April 22, 2003, for all watersheds whose streams originate in that municipality [O. Reg. 140/02, s. 24 (1)], and that the requirements of that plan be implemented in the municipality's official plan. The scope of each plan minimally required:

- a water budget and conservation plan;
- land and water use and management strategies;
- implementation frameworks, including but not requiring plans for contained geographic areas or topically specific plans;
- an environmental monitoring plan;
- provisions requiring environmental management practices and programs (e.g. -regarding pollution, pesticide use etc.)
- criteria for evaluating the protection of water quality and quantity, hydrological features and hydrological functions.

All development within a municipality was prohibited until the completion of this planning exercise, and no development application submitted after April 23, 2007, may proceed if it fails to meet the requirements of the watershed plan, or fails to address the water budget and conservation plan.
