= Alexander Overwijk =

Canadian math teacher

Alexander Overwijk is a Canadian math teacher who went viral for his claim of being able to hand-draw a perfect circle.

== Career ==
Overwijk is the former head of the math department at Glebe Collegiate Institute in Ottawa, Canada. He is also a former basketball player and coach at Carleton University, and was inducted into the Lindsay, Ontario Sports Hall of Fame.

Overwijk is known for his active and experimental teaching style.

== Viral fame ==
Beginning in 1996, to keep his class engaged, Overwijk would tell his students a story about being the "World Freehand Circle Drawing Champion." To further his claim, he would hand-draw a circle on the blackboard. In 2007, a video of Overwijk drawing a near-perfect circle for his class went viral on YouTube. Although the original story was a fabrication, he hosted a real "World Freehand Circle Drawing Championship" as a fundraiser for the Canadian Cancer Society following his viral fame.

In 2012, Overwijk and his circle-drawing abilities were featured on The Today Show. In 2018, a professor of the Department of Mathematics at Stockholm University found the drawing from the 2007 video to have a circularness of 99.7%.
