= SayWeCanFly =

Canadian singer-songwriter

- Born: Braden Barrie; November 18, 1994 (age 31); Lindsay, Ontario, Canada
- Genres: Emo; acoustic; indie pop
- Years active: 2009–present
- Labels: We Are Triumphant Records; Epitaph
- Website: www.flowcode.com/page/saywecanfly/

Braden Barrie is a singer/songwriter from Lindsay, Ontario, Canada. He is currently working under the name SayWeCanFly.

== Career ==
Barrie began performing under the stage name SayWeCanFly in 2009. In 2013, Barrie released an EP titled Heaven Is Hell. SayWeCanFly was ranked number three on Alternative Press's 2013 Readers Poll: Best AP&R Band.

In January 2015, Barrie released his debut album titled Between the Roses. Barrie collaborated with Canadian post-hardcore band Bitter Kids to release a reimagined version of their single, "All of This".

SayWeCanFly performed as part of Warped Tour in 2015. He then embarked on a European and UK tour in early 2016, featuring co-headliners Tonight Alive and Set It Off, as well as The Ready Set.

SayWeCanFly released their third full album, ‘’Beautiful Mess’’, in 2018.

== Discography ==
=== As SayWeCanFly ===
==== Studio albums ====
- Between the Roses (2015)
- Blessed Are Those (2016)
- Beautiful Mess (2018)
- Beneath The Roses (2023)
- Bury The Roses (2025)

==== EPs ====
- Sleepy Time EP (2011)
- Home (2011)
- Dandelion Necklace EP (2012)
- Heaven Is Hell (2013)
- Anything but Beautiful (2013)
- Darling (2015)
- Storyteller Unplugged (2017)
- Nosebleed (2020)
- Skeleton Heart (2022)
- Morning Coffee (2023)
- Not A Home (2025)

=== As Braden Barrie ===
==== Studio albums ====
- Limitless (2018)

Podcast

- Coffee Thoughts Podcast (2014–present)
