= Isa Maud Ilsen =

American music therapist

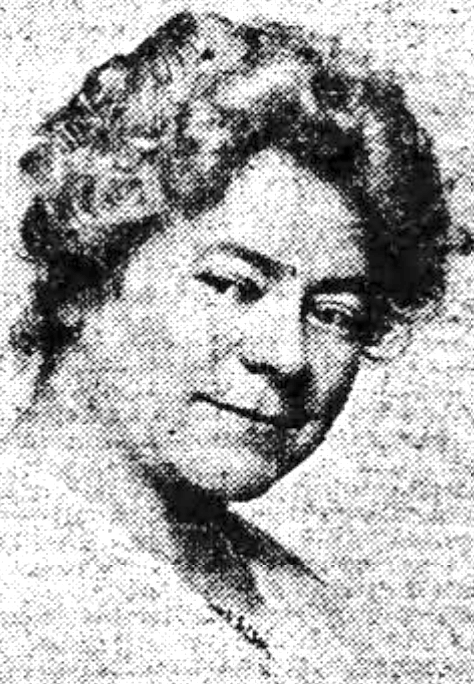
- Isa Maud Ilsen, from a 1918 newspaper
- Born: November 27, 1868; Lindsay, Ontario, Canada
- Died: July 4, 1937 (aged 68); Mendota, Illinois, U.S.
- Occupation(s): Music therapist, nurse, educator

Isa Maud Armstrong Stickney Ilsen Patterson (November 27, 1868 – July 4, 1937) was a Canadian-born American nurse, music therapist, lecturer, and mapmaker. She was the Director of Hospital Music with the American Red Cross during World War I, and founder of the National Association for Music in Hospitals in 1926. She is considered a pioneer in the field of music therapy.

== Early life and education ==
Armstrong was born in Lindsay, Ontario, the daughter of William Thomas Armstrong and Diana Jane Richmond Armstrong. She trained as a nurse at the Jewish Hospital of Cincinnati. She was president of the Jewish Hospital Alumni Association.

== Career ==
Ilsen was active in the Clio Club, a women's music club in Cincinnati. She worked as a "musical almoner" for Thomas Edison in 1915, giving lectures on the psychological aspects of music, and Edison's inventions to bring those benefits to a wider public. In 1916, she was chaperone to a musical prodigy, Claudia Marguerite Race. While seven-year-old Race toured giving harp concerts, Ilsen gave accompanying lectures on "The Musical Education of Children".

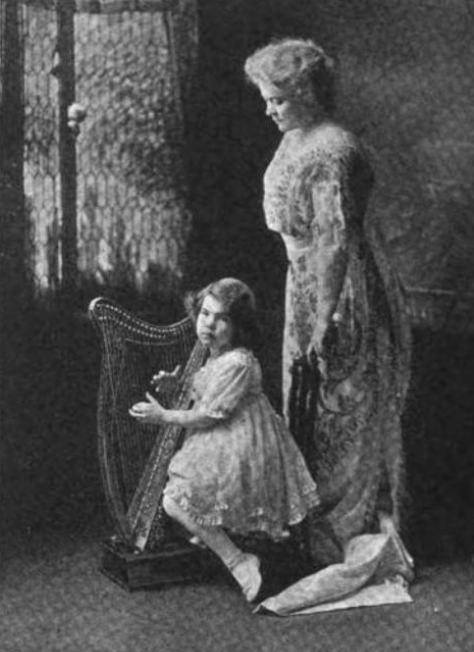
Isa Maud Ilsen with her musical protegee, harpist Claudia Marguerite Race, from a 1916 publication

During World War I, Ilsen worked in Canadian military infirmaries, was the Director of Hospital Music with the American Red Cross. In 1919, she taught the first course in music therapy at Columbia University. She lived in Chimney Rock, North Carolina in the early 1920s, and lectured on the healing properties of music. In 1922, she created "a descriptive map of Hickory Nut Gap and Gorge" and booklet, which she distributed to local businesses. She campaigned for radios to be installed in every hospital and institution, to bring music's healthful influence to patients.

In 1926, Ilsen founded the National Association for Music in Hospitals. "Music can cure some sicknesses," she said of her work. "It helps practically all. But it must be the right kind of music to have medicinal value." She counseled against cello music as too melancholy, but recommended the xylophone as a way to divert a baby's attention; some patients were given an instrument to learn as a rehabilitation strategy. She encouraged music therapists to dress in light colors and sing specific songs for specific illnesses. She was also interested in the benefit of surgeons listening to music in operating rooms. She is considered a pioneer in field of the music therapy.

== Publications ==
- "How Music is Used in Hospitals" (1926)
- "Music's New Vocation" (1925)
- "The psycho-physiological effect of music on tuberculosis patients" (1925, with F. D. Bell)

== Personal life ==
Armstrong was married three times. Her first husband was Alfred Dwight Stickney; they married in 1888, and he died in 1891. Her second husband was German-born music publisher George Ilsen; they married in 1898, and he died in 1912. Her last husband was F. J. Patterson. She died in 1937, at the age of 68, in Mendota, Illinois.
