= Bobcaygeon Independent =

- Type: Weekly newspaper
- Format: Tabloid
- Owner: Metroland Publishing
- Publisher: Bruce Danford
- Founded: 1869
- Ceased publication: 2004
- Headquarters: 54 Anne St. Bobcaygeon, ON Canada
- Price: FREE
- Website: mykawartha.com

The Bobcaygeon Independent was the weekly community newspaper in Bobcaygeon, Ontario, Canada. It was established in 1869. Ownership changed hands many times over the years, until it was purchased along with then owner, Citizens Communication Group, in 2000 by Metroland Publishing.

The Independent covered everything from community events, school issues & family milestones to local crimes and tragedies. During ownership by the Citizens Communication Group, the Bobcaygeon and Fenelon news teams worked closely together, and from time to time, some stories of general interest would run simultaneously in the Independent and its sister paper the Fenelon Falls Gazette. During ownership by Metroland Publishing, a similar news style was used with common pages in both Bobcaygeon and Fenelon papers, and in the Lindsay This Week newspaper.

The paper was officially incorporated into Kawartha Lakes This Week in late 2004 in keeping with the amalgamation of Lindsay, Bobcaygeon and Fenelon Falls into the City of Kawartha Lakes.

Today, back issues are available at the Bobcaygeon Public Library for viewing on Microfiche, as far back as the first issue in 1869.

Although the paper had ceased publication in 2004, the website Amazon.com still offers subscriptions.

== Past editors ==
- C.E. Stewart (1851–1921)
- Keith Knight (198?-1993)
- Michelle Douglass (1993–1994)
- Norm Wagenaar (199?-2000)
- Paul Rutherford (2000–2001)
- Marcus Tully (2001–2004)

== Past sales managers ==
- John Kimble (19??-1998)
- Adam Milligan (2000–2002)
- Mary Babcock (2002–2004)

== Past publishers ==
- Thomas J Haire (1968- 1984)
- Andrea Douglas (1995-1999)
- Charles Canning (1999-1999)
- Myra Futa (1999–2000)
- Hugh Nicholson (2000–2002)
- Bruce Danford (2002–2004)
