= Kawartha Lakes This Week =

- Front page of the May 14, 2020 edition
- Type: Twice-weekly newspaper
- Format: Tabloid
- Owner(s): Metroland Publishing
- Publisher: Peter Bishop
- Editor: Marcus Tully
- Founded: 1977
- Ceased publication: 2023
- Headquarters: 192 St. David Street; Lindsay, Ontario
- Circulation: 30,000 (unpaid)
- Price: Free
- Website: www.mykawartha.com

Kawartha Lakes This Week is a weekly, community newspaper in Lindsay, Ontario, Canada, that was established in 1977 under the title Lindsay This Week. It is one of three newspapers in the Kawartha Division of Metroland Publishing, a company that owns newspapers across Ontario. News content is updated on its site, www.MyKawartha.com, several times a week with video, blogs, polls and stories from its sister papers in the region.

Kawartha Lakes This Week has a circulation of 30,300, including papers delivered to boxes, and employs 22 people. The publisher is Peter Bishop, the editor-in-chief is Lois Tuffin and the managing editor is Marcus Tully. Tully started with the paper as a reporter in 2001.

The paper changed its name from Lindsay This Week to Kawartha Lakes This Week in late 2004 in keeping with the amalgamation of the City of Kawartha Lakes.

== History ==
After graduating from the University of Windsor Law School, Douglas Flett moved to Lindsay and practised law in the community from 1974 until 1996. In 1980, he and Don Polyschuk, then-owner of Trent Chevrolet, founded Lindsay This Week. They owned the newspaper for four years.

Metroland Publishing purchased Lindsay This Week in 1988 In 2000, Metroland Publishing acquired the Fenelon Falls Gazette and Bobcaygeon Independent when they purchased the Citizens Communication Group. The three editions merged in 2004 to become Kawartha Lakes This Week to reflect the amalgamation of the three towns (and several townships) into the City of Kawartha Lakes.

=== Past editors ===
- Paul Rutherford (1999-2001)
- Marcus Tully (2001–2023)

=== Past sales managers ===
- Harvey Spry (1995–1996)
- Doug Hartwick (1997-1999)
- Myra Futa (2000–2001)
- Adam Milligan (2001–2002)
- Mary Babcock (2002–2005)
- Bryce McGregor (2005–2006)
- Shane Lockyer (2006–2010)
- Gord Carley (2010)
- Bonnie Rondeau (2010–2011)

=== Past publishers ===
- Hugh Nicholson (1993-2001)
- Bruce Danford (2002–2014)
- Mike Mount (2014-2016)
- Peter Bishop (2016–Present)

== See also ==
- List of newspapers in Canada
