= Scugog River =

- Location of the mouth of the Scugog River in southern Ontario

Location
- Country: Canada
- Province: Ontario
- Region: Central Ontario
- Municipality: Kawartha Lakes

Physical characteristics
- Source: Lake Scugog
  - coordinates: 44°16′25″N 78°44′54″W
  - elevation: 250 m (820 ft)
- Mouth: Sturgeon Lake
  - coordinates: 44°23′16″N 78°45′03″W
  - elevation: 246 m (807 ft)

Basin features
- River system: Great Lakes Basin

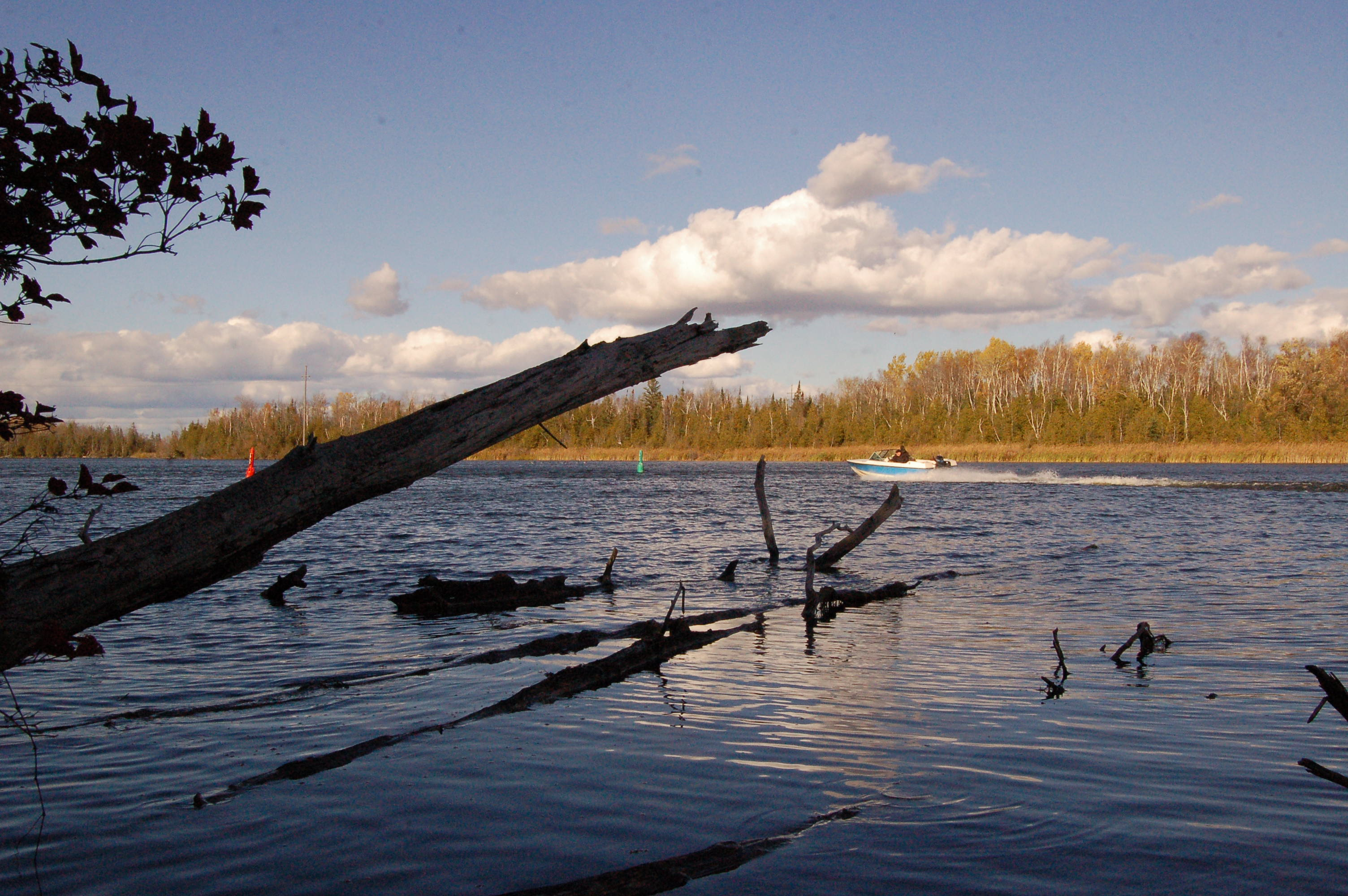

The Scugog River is a river in the city of Kawartha Lakes in Central Ontario, Canada. It is in the Kawartha Lakes region, is part of the Great Lakes Basin, and is a branch of the Trent-Severn Waterway.

The river flows north from the northeast end of Lake Scugog, goes under Ontario Highway 7, heads through the community of Lindsay where it passes through Trent-Severn Waterway Lock 33 and associated control dams, and reaches its mouth at Sturgeon Lake. Sturgeon Lake flows via the Otonabee River and the Trent River to Lake Ontario.

== Tributaries ==
- East Cross Creek (right)
- Mariposa Brook (left)

== See also ==
- List of Ontario rivers

== Sources ==
- Map 5 (PDF) (Map). 1 : 700,000. Official road map of Ontario. Ministry of Transportation of Ontario. 2014.
- Restructured municipalities - Ontario map #6 (Map). Restructuring Maps of Ontario. Ontario Ministry of Municipal Affairs and Housing. 2006. Archived from the original on 2021-02-24.
