= Joey Lawrence (photographer) =

Canadian photographer

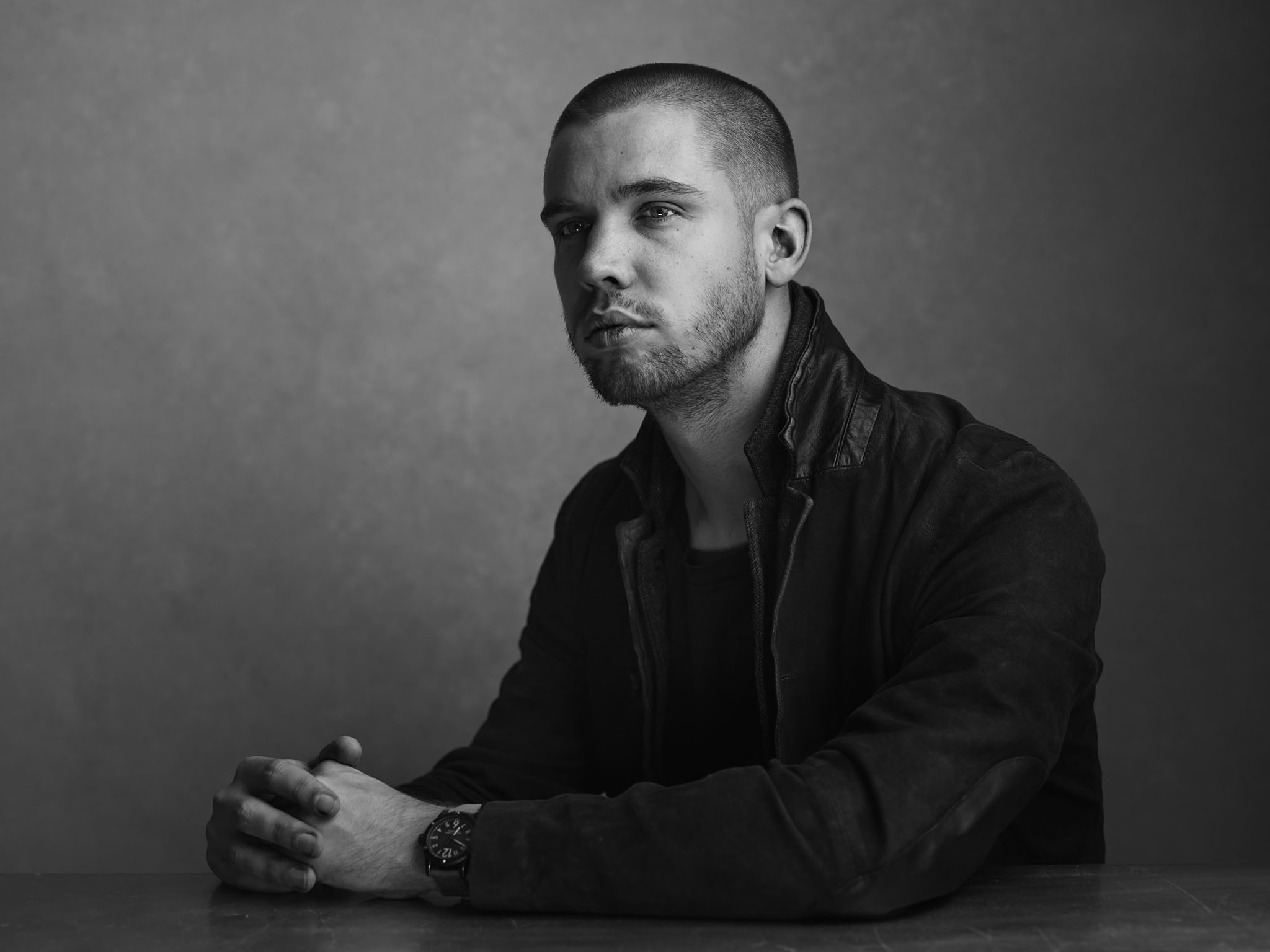
- Lawrence's self portrait
- Born: November 5, 1989 (age 37); Lindsay, Ontario, Canada
- Occupation: Photographer
- Website: joeyl.com

Joey Lawrence (born November 5, 1989), known professionally as Joey L, is a Canadian professional photographer who currently resides in Brooklyn, New York.

== Start of career ==
Joey Lawrence's interest in photography began when he was seven years of age. His father, who restored antiques, let him borrow a 1.3 megapixel point and shoot camera, with which he took his first photos of his dinosaur toys. He grew up in rural Ontario, Canada.

Lawrence started entering photography competitions in DPChallenge in 2004 using a point-and-shoot digital camera. It was not long before his photographs were winning and shortly thereafter he was producing educational DVDs for aspiring photographers. He then began taking photographs of bands, asking for $50 and concert tickets in return. From that point on his professional career developed quickly, he was taken on by agents in London and New York City.

Lawrence states that he is completely self-educated in photography.

When he was 18, Lawrence was hired to create the poster for the movie adaptation of the first Twilight book. In 2008, the poster Lawrence created for the first Twilight movie was released. In an interview with MTV, Lawrence confirmed at the time that he would be doing the posters for the rest of the movie, saying he planned to retain their "dark and edgy" stylings.

While Lawrence is based in New York and works out of his photography studio in Brooklyn, he is often elsewhere working on both commissioned and personal projects.

== Ethiopian photography ==
In the making of a gallery exhibition, Lawrence traveled to Ethiopia three times over the course of three years to photograph the Karo, Mursi, Hamer, Daasanach and Arbore tribes of the Omo Valley. On his second trip, Lawrence took the photographs back to Ethiopia and showed them to the tribes people in order to gain trust amongst the clan chiefs and continue the photographic series. One of his 2009 trips was filmed to make the documentary Faces of a Vanishing World. In discussion with The National Post, Lawrence said he used studio lighting and a modern style to shoot the photos, saying "they become overlooked when they are depicted in... black-and-white..., as noble savages, as unchanged people". The stylistic treatment is to render them too as part of the modern world. The images were published under the title The Cradle of Mankind, and were featured on the Time website.

== Guerrilla Fighters of Kurdistan ==
In 2015, the events surrounding the Syrian Civil War caught Joey Lawrence's attention. He traveled to the front line to take portrait-style photos to humanize the sights of war. He embedded with Kurdish guerrilla groups in Makhmour, Iraq and entered into rebel-controlled Syria. He spent days on a resistance line of the Kurdistan Workers' Party (PKK) and the Sinjar Resistance Units (YBS), photographing the battle for the city of Sinjar. For the project, he stayed with the YPG and YPJ in an abandoned Islamic State base in Tell Hamis.

Images from the project have been featured in Independent and Vanity Fair Italia.

== Halloween in Brooklyn Photo series ==
Halloween in Brooklyn is a photo series Lawrence began in 2010 after finding himself at home in Brooklyn. He realized that the costumed people patrolling the neighborhood in search of candy might seem as strange to an outsider as anything he might have experienced in India. He decided to photograph the annual celebration as if he was experiencing it for the first time.

Since 2010, he has returned Brooklyn to continue this series almost yearly.

== Other work ==
Lawrence has photographed notable people including Robert De Niro, Jessica Chastain, and Martin Sheen, and has worked with the US Army, the History Channel, National Geographic Channel, Canon Cameras, ACLU, Lavazza, Jose Cuervo, and charity: water.

Lawrence did a period-correct photo shoot for National Geographic's film, Killing Kennedy.

The Lavazza Foundation and Slow Food contracted Joey L. to photograph their 2016 calendar, themed "From Father to Son" and showing two generations as they work and learn.

== Awards ==
In 2009, Joey Lawrence placed first in the Professional Portrait division of the International Photography Awards. He won the award again in 2015.

In 2014, Eyefi named Joey Lawrence as one of the Top 30 Most Socially Influential Photographers.
