= Sturgeon Lake (Ontario) =

Lake in southern Ontario, Canada

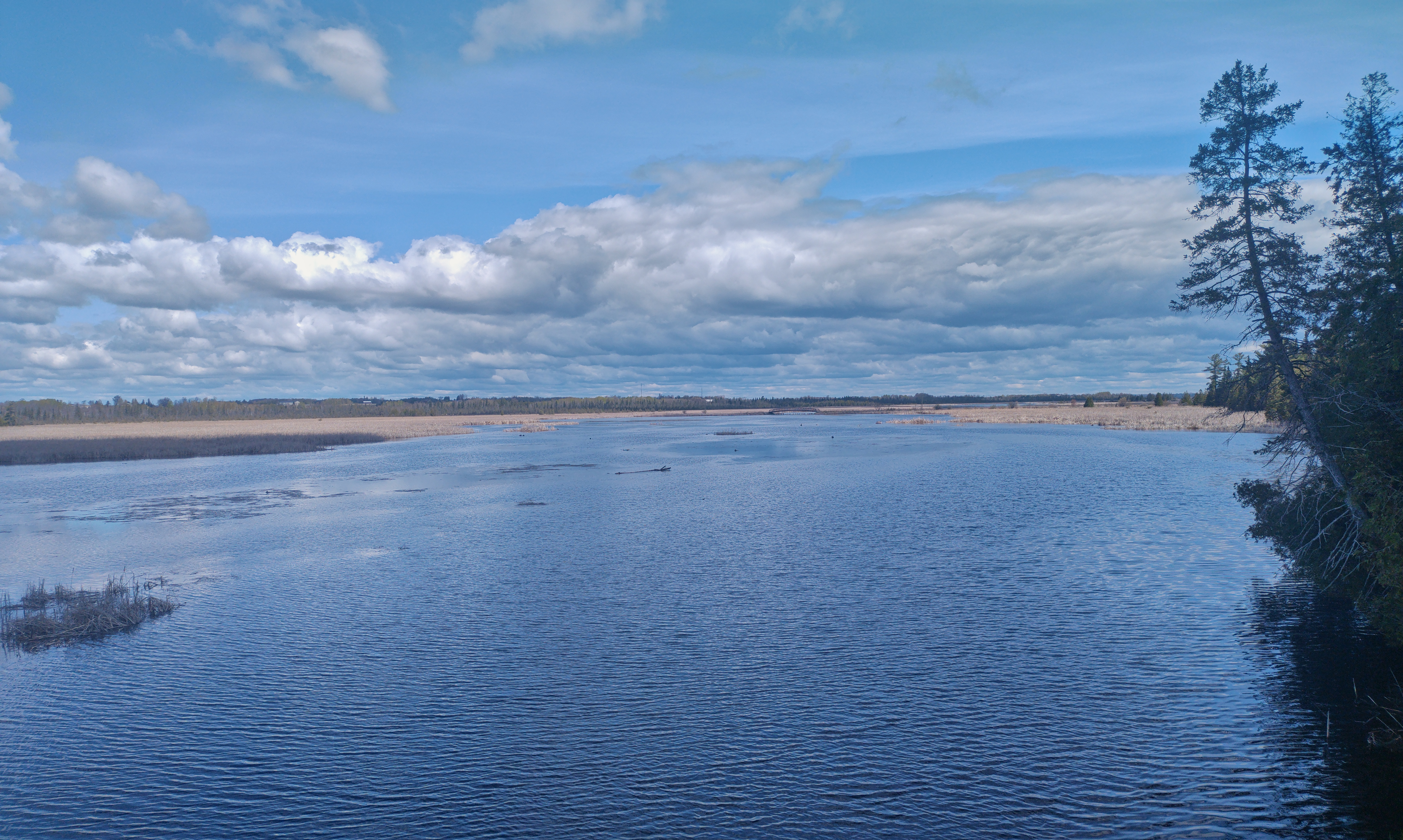

- Location within Southern Ontario
- Location: Kawartha Lakes, Ontario
- Group: Kawartha Lakes
- Coordinates: 44°28′N 78°43′W
- Primary inflows: Fenelon River, Scugog River
- Basin countries: Canada
- Max. length: 25 km (16 mi)
- Max. width: 3 km (2 mi)
- Surface elevation: 246 m (807 ft)
- Settlements: Lindsay, Fenelon Falls, Sturgeon Point, Bobcaygeon, Dunsford

Sturgeon Lake is a lake in the Kawartha Lakes region of Ontario, Canada. It is part of the Trent-Severn Waterway. The lake is Y-shaped and has the communities of Fenelon Falls, Lindsay, Sturgeon Point and Bobcaygeon at the north-west, south, central and north-east points of the Y respectively. The lake is approximately 25 km (16 mi) from the southern to the north-eastern extremes, the longer axis.

== Geography ==
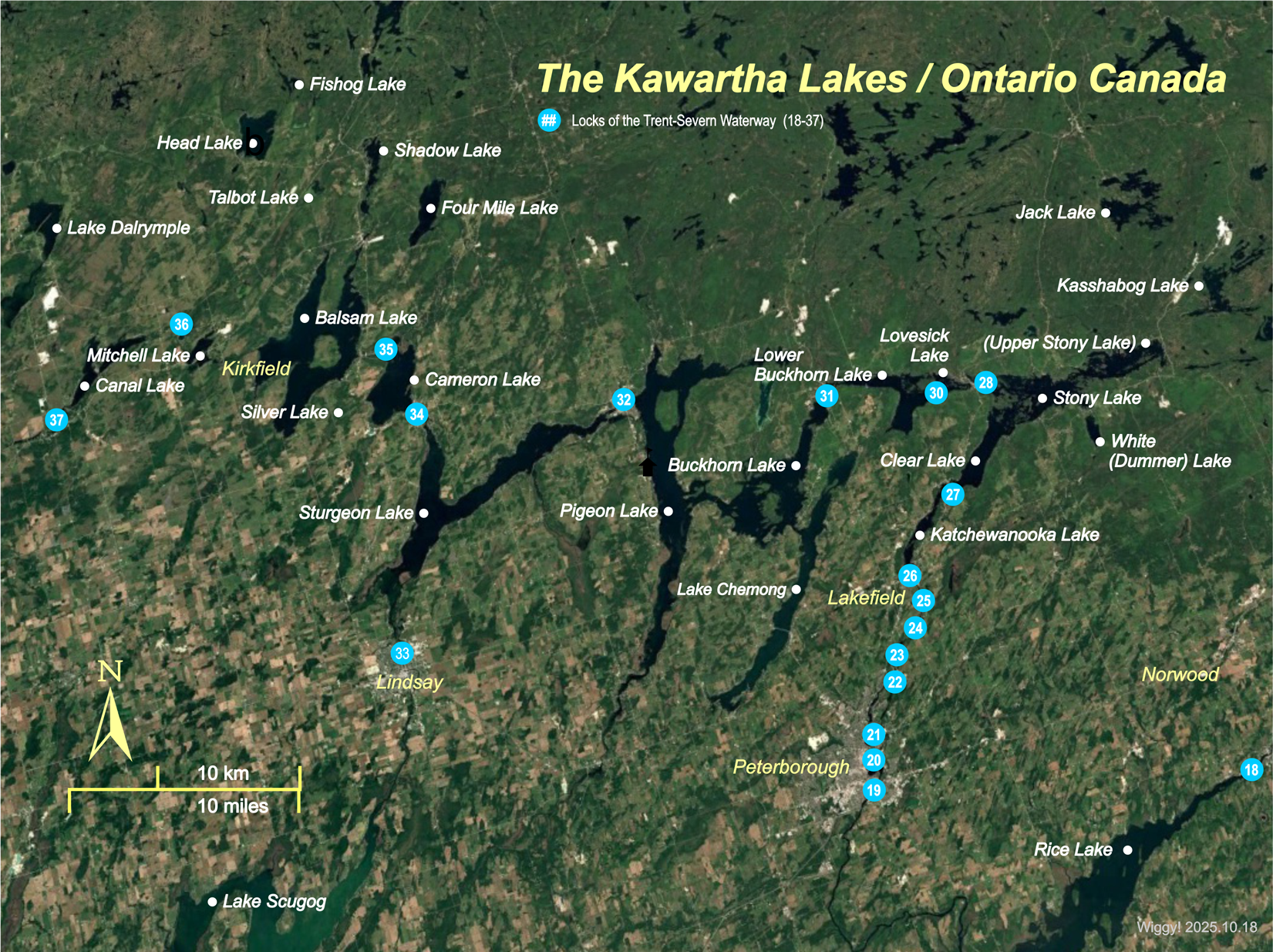
The Kawartha Lakes and Trent-Severn Waterway; Sturgeon Lake at centre left.

The Scugog River flows into the lake at the southern apex. Cameron Lake also flows into this lake, via the Fenelon River at the north-western extreme. Emily Creek empties into the lake at the middle south.

The lake outflow is through the Big Bob and Little Bob channels of the Bobcaygeon River at the north-east of the lake.

== Fish species ==
Game fish species include large and small mouth bass, muskie, and walleye.

== See also ==
- List of lakes in Ontario

== Sources ==
- Media related to Sturgeon Lake (Ontario) at Wikimedia Commons
- Atlas of Canada topographic maps 31D7 and 31D10 retrieved 2007-11-06
