= Raine Storey =

Canadian artist (born 1995)

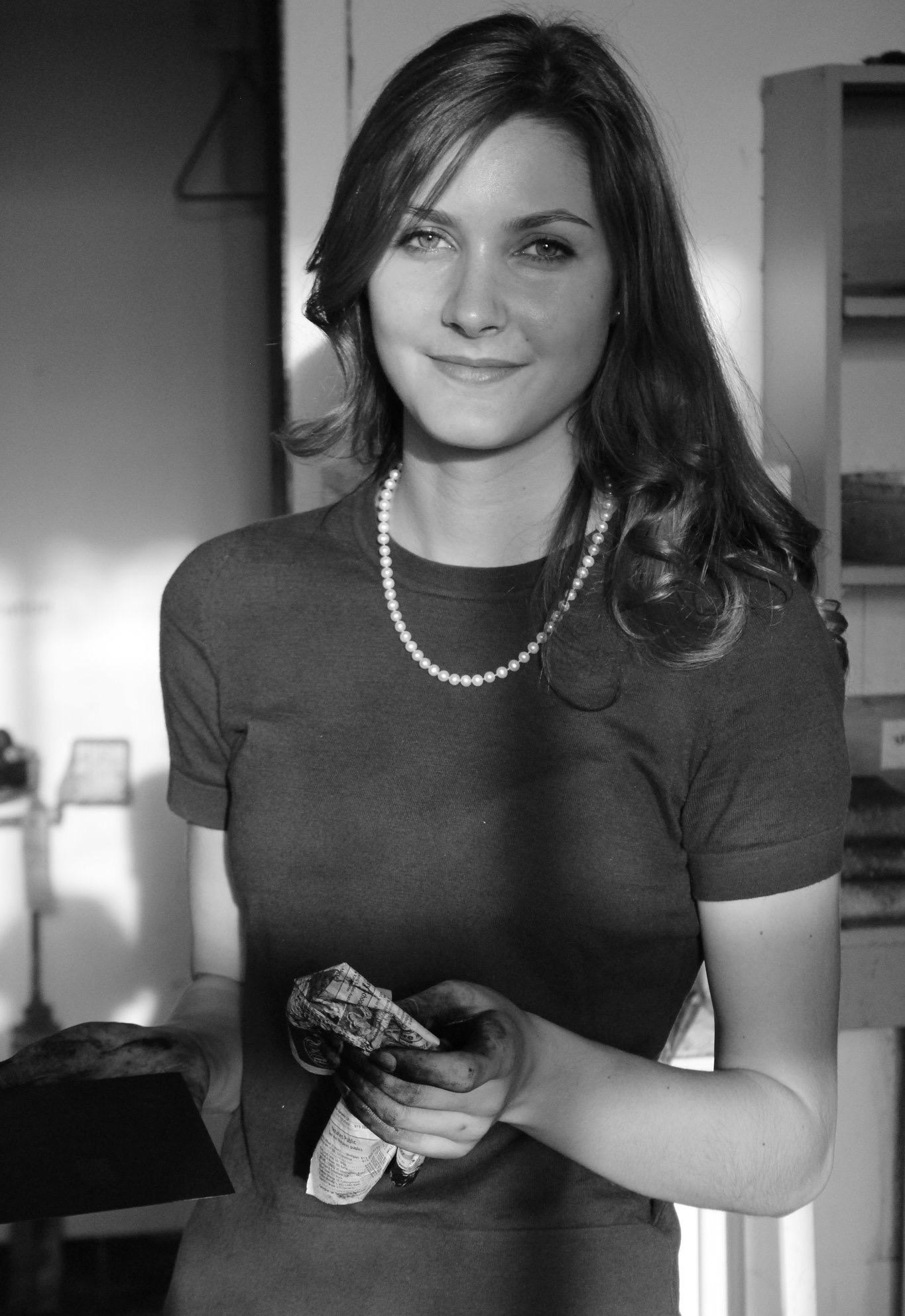
- Storey working on copper plate printing
- Born: June 3, 1995 (age 29); Fenelon Falls, Ontario
- Education: Queen's University (B.F.A. Hons.)
- Occupation: Artist
- Known for: Illustrator, Painter and Printmaker
- Awards: Loran Award, 2013
- Website: www.rainestorey.com

Raine Storey (born 3 June 1995) is a Canadian artist known for her paintings, illustrations and multi-disciplinary designs.

== Life and work ==
Raine Storey was born to Sue and Chris Storey and grew up in Fenelon Falls, ON. Her mother is the daughter of the British-born Canadian artist Derek Woodhead and is a nationally decorated police officer. Storey consistently cites her grandfather as the chief influence on her work, stating in 2013 that, "He pushes me the most". She commented again in 2017, calling her grandfather, "a talented artist" who she is "closely tied with". As a 15-year-old Fenelon Falls Secondary School student, Storey founded Raine Storey Illustration, taking private commissions, while selling her creations.

Storey is known for composing humorous and intriguing visual paintings that reimagine everyday scenarios and personal memories through fragmented, hyperreal imagery, bright, gestural brushstrokes and large areas of negative space.

In 2013, Storey was awarded the Loran Award, the largest Canadian post-secondary scholarship, worth $100,000, for the funding of her entire undergraduate studies. Storey is the second visual artist to have received the award. As a Loran Scholar, Storey attended Queen's University in Kingston, ON within the Bachelor of Fine Arts (Hons.) program, coupled with a minor in the History of Art. At Queen's, Storey was also the Graphic Director of the Queen's International Affairs Association.

In 2014, Storey held an exhibition in Toronto, entitled "Fashionably Illustrated". The following year, Storey spent the summer working in Quito, Ecuador as an art therapist. In Spring/Summer of 2016, she travelled to Sydney, Australia working largely on printmaking, including examples of lithography on silk. In a television interview Paul Lafrance and his wife Janna highlighted one of Storey's hand-painted silk scarves, while talking about the promotion of a new generation of artists.

Storey was exhibited in the 2021 London Art Biennale for her piece Daliesque Woman and in the same year won the People's Choice Prize at the 2021 British Art Prize. Storey's most recent work is currently being displayed at The ARX gallery in London where she will have a solo show during London Frieze week in October 2022.
