= Fenelon Falls Gazette =

Weekly newspaper in Fenelon Falls, Ontario, Canada (1873–2004)

- Type: Weekly newspaper
- Format: Tabloid
- Owner: Metroland Publishing
- Publisher: Bruce Danford
- Founded: 1873
- Ceased publication: 2004
- Headquarters: Fenelon Falls, ON Canada
- Website: mykawartha.com

The Fenelon Falls Gazette was a weekly community newspaper in Fenelon Falls, Ontario, Canada. It was established in 1873 by E.D. Hand. Ownership changed hands many times over the years, until it was purchased along with then owner, Citizens Communication Group in 2000 by Metroland Publishing.

The Gazette covered community events, school issues, family milestones, local crimes and tragedies. During ownership by Citizens Communication Group (CCG), the Fenelon and Bobcaygeon news teams worked closely together, and from time to time, some stories of general interest ran simultaneously in the Gazette and its sister paper, the Bobcaygeon Independent. During ownership by Metroland Publishing, a similar news style was used with common pages in both Fenelon and Bobcaygeon papers, and the Lindsay This Week newspaper.

The paper was incorporated into Kawartha Lakes This Week in late 2004 in keeping with the amalgamation of Lindsay, Fenelon Falls and Bobcaygeon into the City of Kawartha Lakes.

Today, back issues are available at the Lindsay and Fenelon Falls branches of the Kawartha Lakes Public Library for viewing on microfiche, back to the first issue in 1873.
