= Cameron Lake (Ontario) =

Lake in southern Ontario, Canada

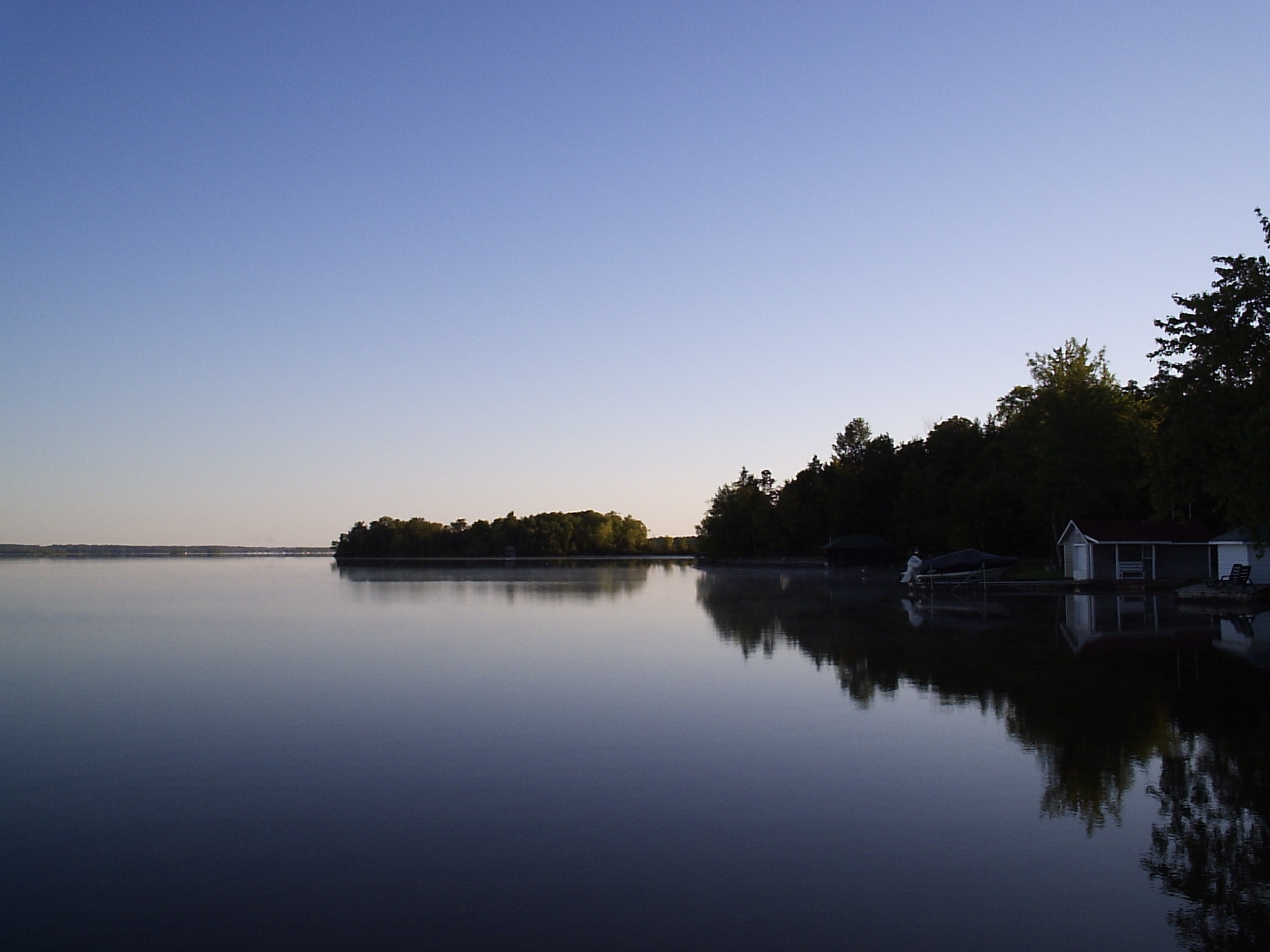
- in early morning (the sun is behind the trees, and this is a north-facing view)

- Location within Ontario
- Location: Ontario
- Group: Kawartha lakes
- Coordinates: 44°33′N 78°46′W
- Primary inflows: Burnt River, Rosedale River
- Basin countries: Canada
- Max. length: 6.7 km (4.2 mi)
- Max. width: 3.5 km (2.2 mi)
- Max. depth: 15 m (49 ft)
- Islands: Lakers Islands (a.k.a. Boyd and Rathbun islands)

A map of the city of Kawartha Lakes with Cameron Lake highlighted

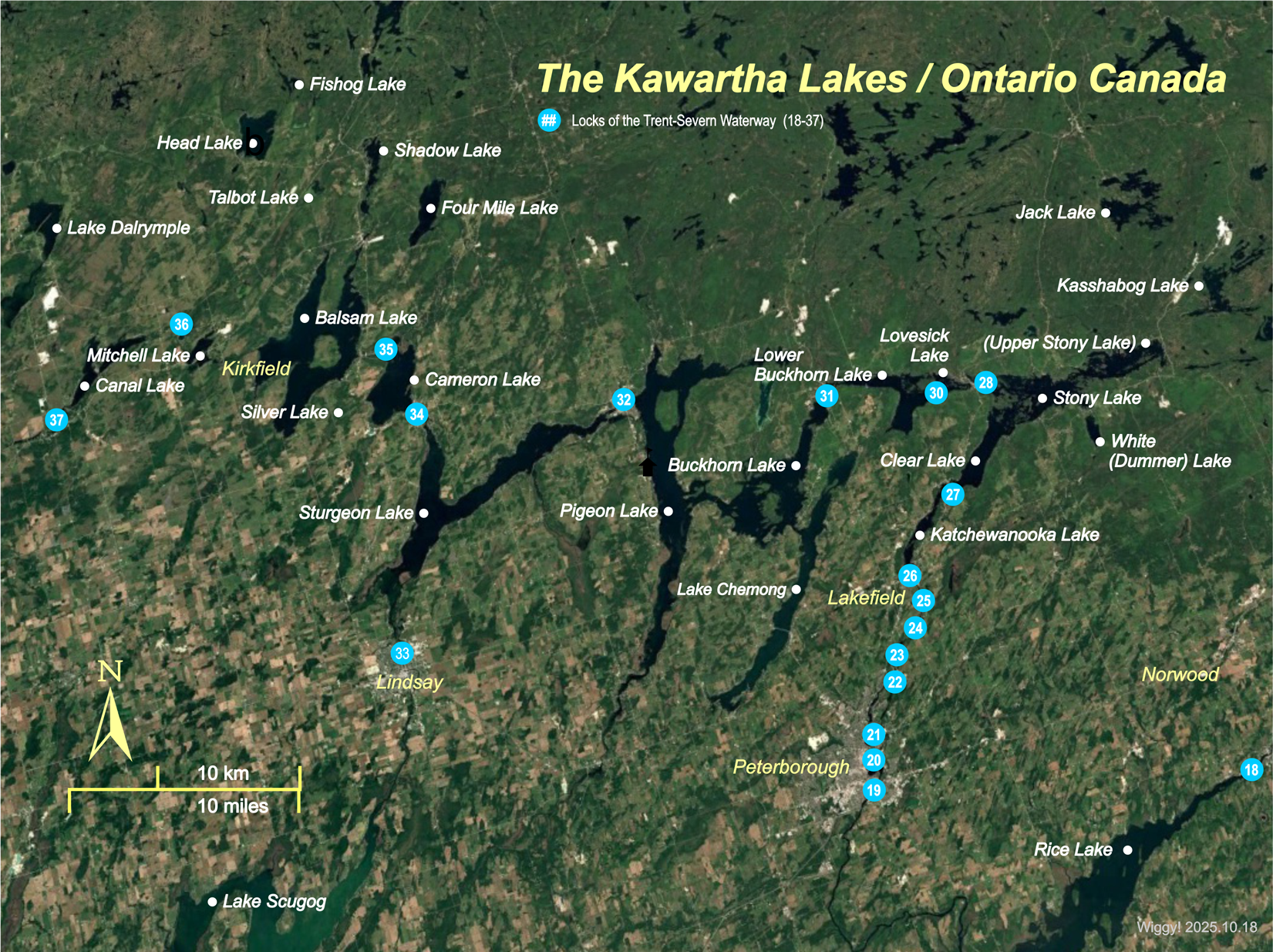
The Kawartha Lakes and the Trent Severn Waterway; Cameron Lake in the upper left quadrant

Cameron Lake, Ontario is one of the Kawartha Lakes and is a lake bordering the town of Fenelon Falls and is part of the Trent–Severn Waterway. The lake is some 6.7 kilometres (4.2 mi) long by 3.5 kilometres (2.2 mi) wide and is quite deep, reaching 15 metres (49 ft) in places. The lake lies between locks 34 & 35 on the Trent–Severn Waterway.

Much of the side of the lake is taken up with housing and is a popular place to live. The town of Fenelon Falls is found between Sturgeon Lake and Cameron Lake. The lake is popular with boaters and fisherman. Fish found in the lake include:

- smallmouth bass,
- largemouth bass,
- walleye (pickerel)
- Pike and
- muskie (occasionally tiger muskellunge).

In the lake are found the Lakers Islands (a.k.a. Boyd and Rathbun islands). The Burnt River and Rosedale River are tributaries of the lake.

Cameron lake is not eutrophic because it has a high flushing rate which counteracts its high phosphorus loading.

== See also ==
- List of lakes of Ontario
