= Evangeline Lydia Emsley =

Canadian nurse (1885–1967)

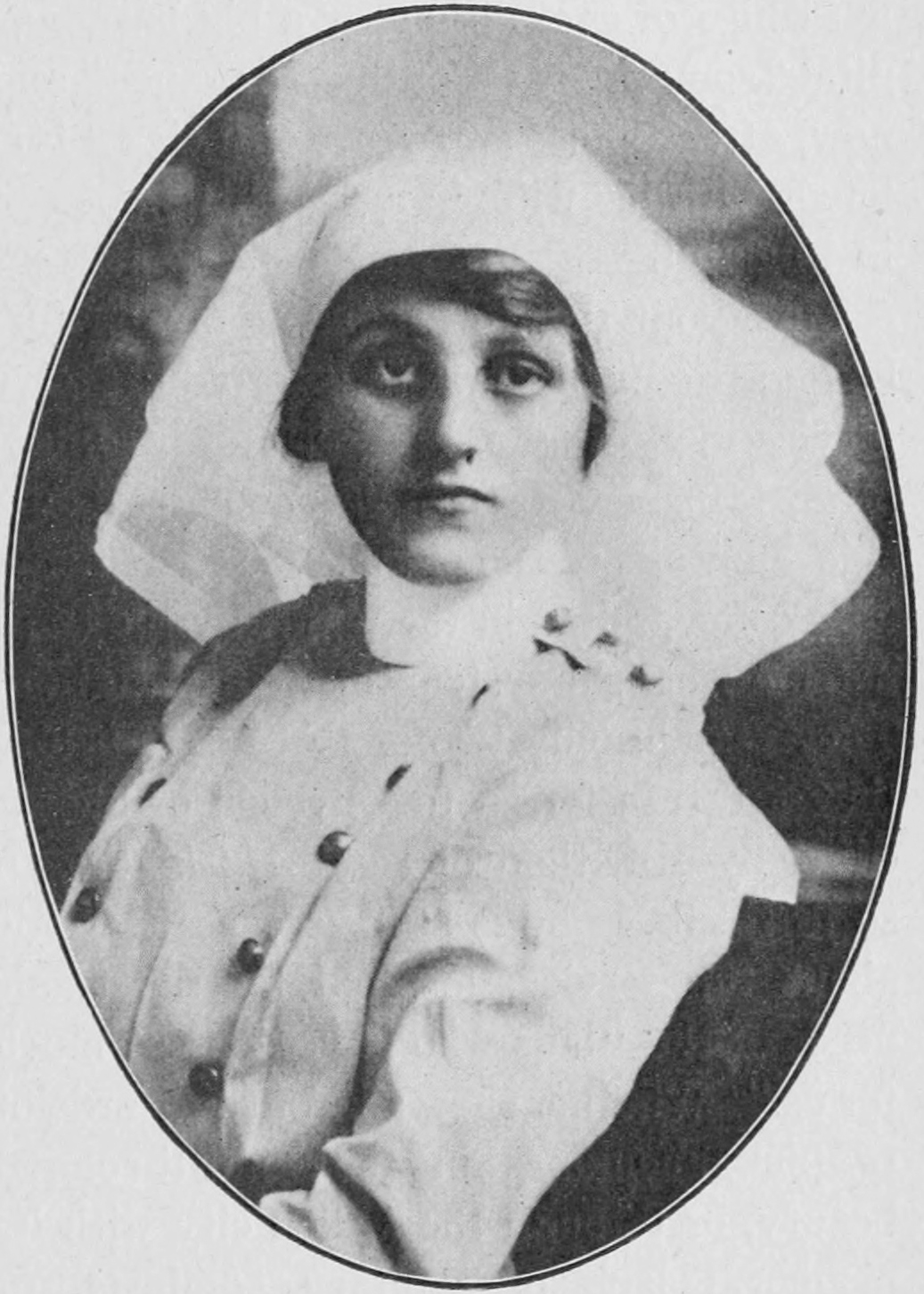
Evangeline Emsley in uniform, from a 1916 publication.

Evangeline Lydia Emsley ARRC (March 1885 – February 21, 1967), sometimes written as Lydia Evangeline Emsley, was a Canadian nurse who was decorated for her service as a member of the Royal Canadian Army Medical Corps during World War I.

== Early life ==
Evangeline Emsley was born in Lindsay, Ontario, the daughter of Rev. William Henry Emsley and Susan A. Major Emsley. Her father was a Methodist pastor and military chaplain from Barnsley, in Yorkshire. She trained as a nurse at Columbia Hospital in Washington, D.C., graduating in 1909.

== Career ==
Emsley was appointed Superintendent of Nurses at Kingston General Hospital in Ontario in 1912. She joined the Canadian Army Medical Corps in 1915. In England, she worked as night supervisor at the Duchess of Connaught's Canadian Red Cross Hospital in Taplow. She was sent to a base hospital in Boulogne. In King George V's 1919 Birthday Honours, she was awarded a Royal Red Cross, second class, for her service during the war. After she returned to Canada in 1919, she resumed a civilian nursing career, working for the health department in Oshawa in 1929.

== Personal life ==
In 1931, Emsley married Frederick James Donevan (1880-1948), a widowed doctor who had also served in the Canadian Army Medical Corps in France and England. They lived in Oshawa with his daughter Constance Marie Donevan, who also became a nurse.
