= I. E. Weldon Secondary School =

I.E. Weldon Secondary School
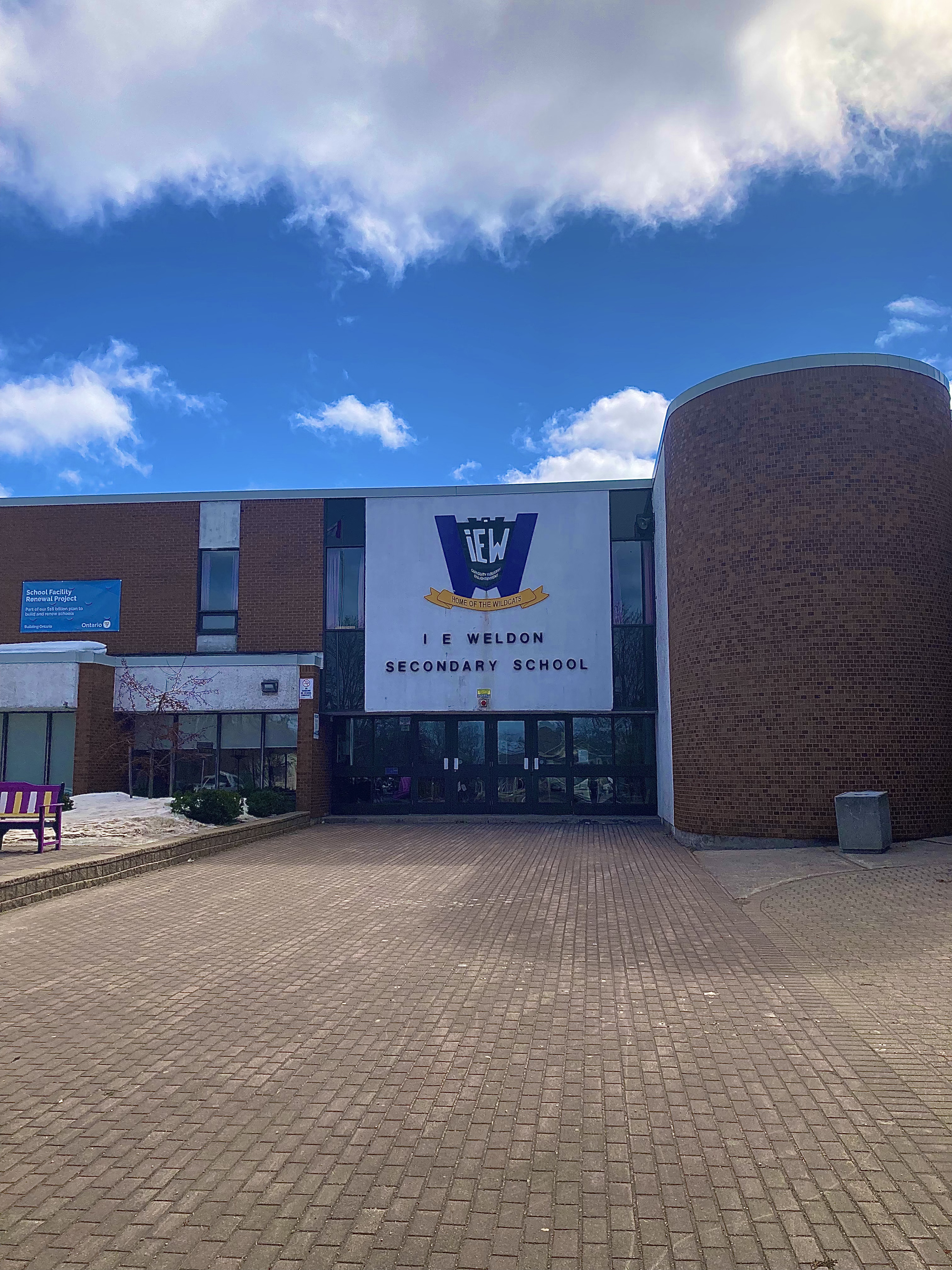

Location
- 24 Weldon Road; Lindsay, Ontario, K9V 4R6; Canada; 44.35982°N 78.71442°W

Information
- School type: Public
- Motto: Curiosity, Industry, Enlightenment
- Founded: 1971
- School board: Trillium Lakelands District School Board
- Principal: Denise De Paola
- Grades: 9-12
- Language: English and French Immersion
- Colours: Gold, Purple
- Mascot: Wild Cat
- Team name: Weldon Wild Cats
- Website: iew.tldsb.on.ca

I.E. Weldon Secondary School is a public high school in Lindsay, Ontario, Canada, which teaches grades 9, 10, 11, and 12. It is operated by the Trillium Lakelands District School Board. The school contains 60 rooms for rent, over 200 classrooms, 2 gymnasiums, a fitness center (work out room), a multi-media library resource center, and specialized areas for music, drama, art, cooking, woodworking and shop. It is also home to one of the largest French immersion High School programs in Canada. There are currently 1,059 children enrolled.

== History ==
The school opened in 1971 with additions completed in 1985, 1995, and 2002. The school was named after a prominent local lawyer, Isaac Ernest Weldon, who left a generous bequest of money to the Victoria County Board of Education, with the stipulation that the interest generated annually would be divided amongst graduating students in the County advancing to post-secondary education.

The school's proximity to Kawartha Lakes City Road 36 caused council to request more frequent monitoring of speed limits by municipal police. The school was a campaign stop for Ontario Premier Dalton McGuinty during the 2007 general election.

== Education ==
I.E. Weldon Secondary School offers diversified programs focusing on academics, the arts, co-operative education, personal development and technical studies to meet the individual needs of students. The school offers a full French Immersion Program. The International Baccalaureate Diploma (IB Diploma Programme) is a rigorous Grade 11 and 12 international curriculum involving six subject areas. The Practical, Academic and Life Skills (PALS) program for developmentally delayed students provides many opportunities to develop physical, social and employability skills. Students in the area of Technical Studies are very active as they work towards a trade through the Ontario Youth Apprenticeship Program. The school also offers a Specialist High Skills Major in construction, as well as a dual credit program with Fleming College in Peterborough. Recently it has also started offering SHSM in Arts and Culture.

== Extracurricular activities and clubs ==
=== Leadership ===
Students and staff at Weldon contribute to Plan International Canada, which supports children in developing countries around the world. Weldon currently sponsors 30 children through this program, ranking the school as one of the top contributing schools in Canada. The school routinely raises significant funds through the following events: United Way campaign, Hoops for Heart, and Big Bike for Heart and Stroke. Their Terry Fox Run raised more than $25,000 in 2009, with over 500 students participating.

=== Programs ===
Extra-curricular programs provide opportunities for students pursuing a diverse range of interests. Clubs available for student participation include a Me to We team (known as Wildcats for Change), a Reach For the Top trivia team, the Weldon Writer's Guild, and the Student Administrative Council.

=== Athletics ===
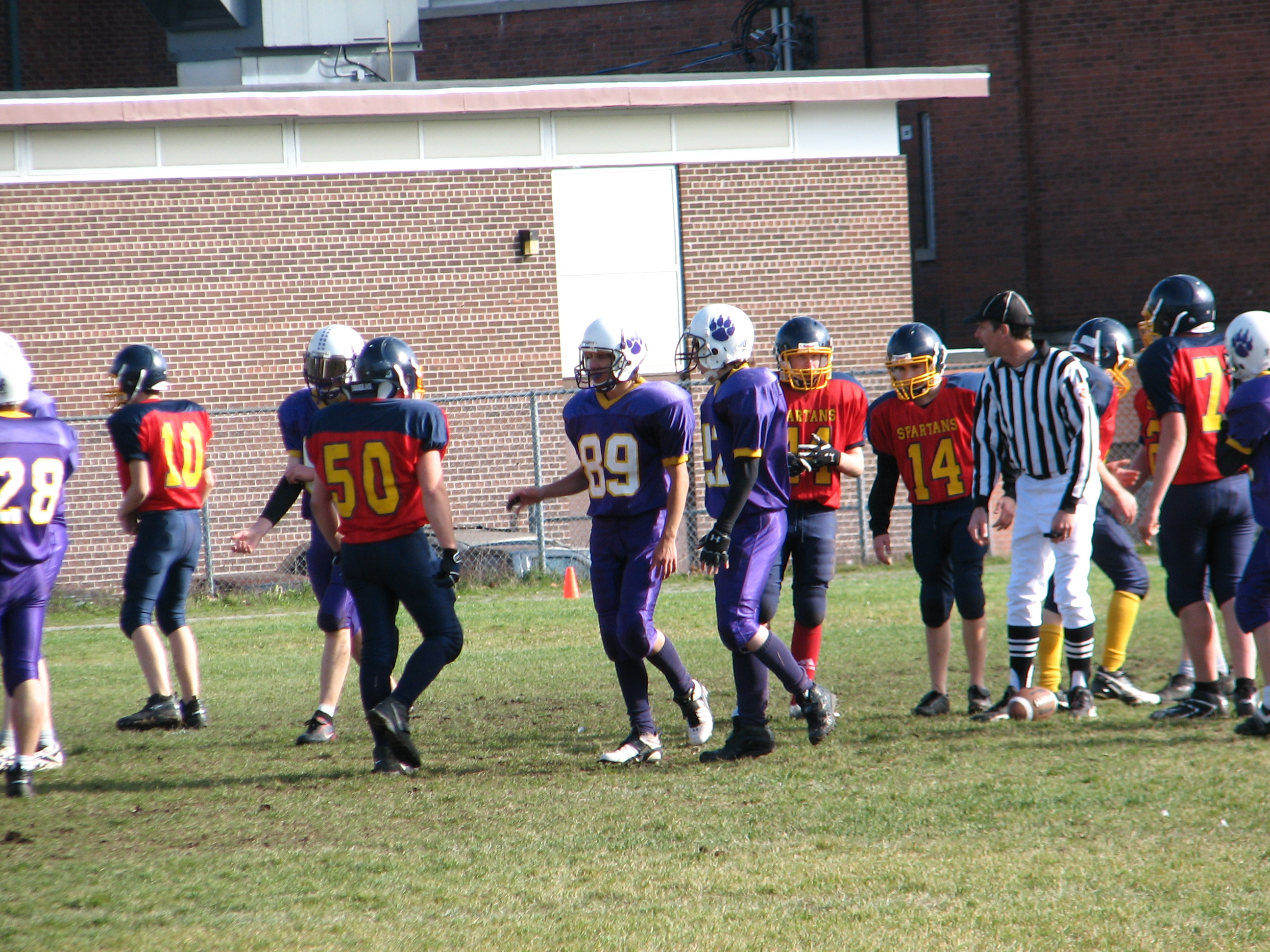
I. E. Weldon vs. LCVI.

Coed	Male	Female
Badminton Team, junior; Badminton Team, senior; Badminton Club, junior; Badminton Club, senior; Cross Country, junior; Cross Country, senior; Swimming, junior; Swimming, senior; Track and field, junior; Track and field, senior; Curling, varsity	Basketball, junior; Basketball, senior; Soccer, junior; Soccer, senior; Volleyball, junior; Volleyball, senior; Wrestling, junior; Wrestling, senior; Rugby, junior; Rugby, senior; Ice Hockey, varsity	Basketball, junior; Basketball, senior; Soccer, junior; Soccer, senior; Volleyball, junior; Volleyball, senior; Wrestling, junior; Wrestling, senior; Rugby, junior; Rugby, senior; Ice Hockey, varsity

== Notable alumni ==
Note that not all personalities listed are known to have graduated from I. E. Weldon.

- Jeff Beukeboom, retired NHL professional hockey player
- Carl Coulter, retired CFL professional football player
- Tyler Kyte, television actor and singer
- Luka Magnotta, notable criminal

== See also ==
- Education in Ontario
- List of secondary schools in Ontario
