= Lindsay, Ontario =

Lindsay
- Unincorporated community
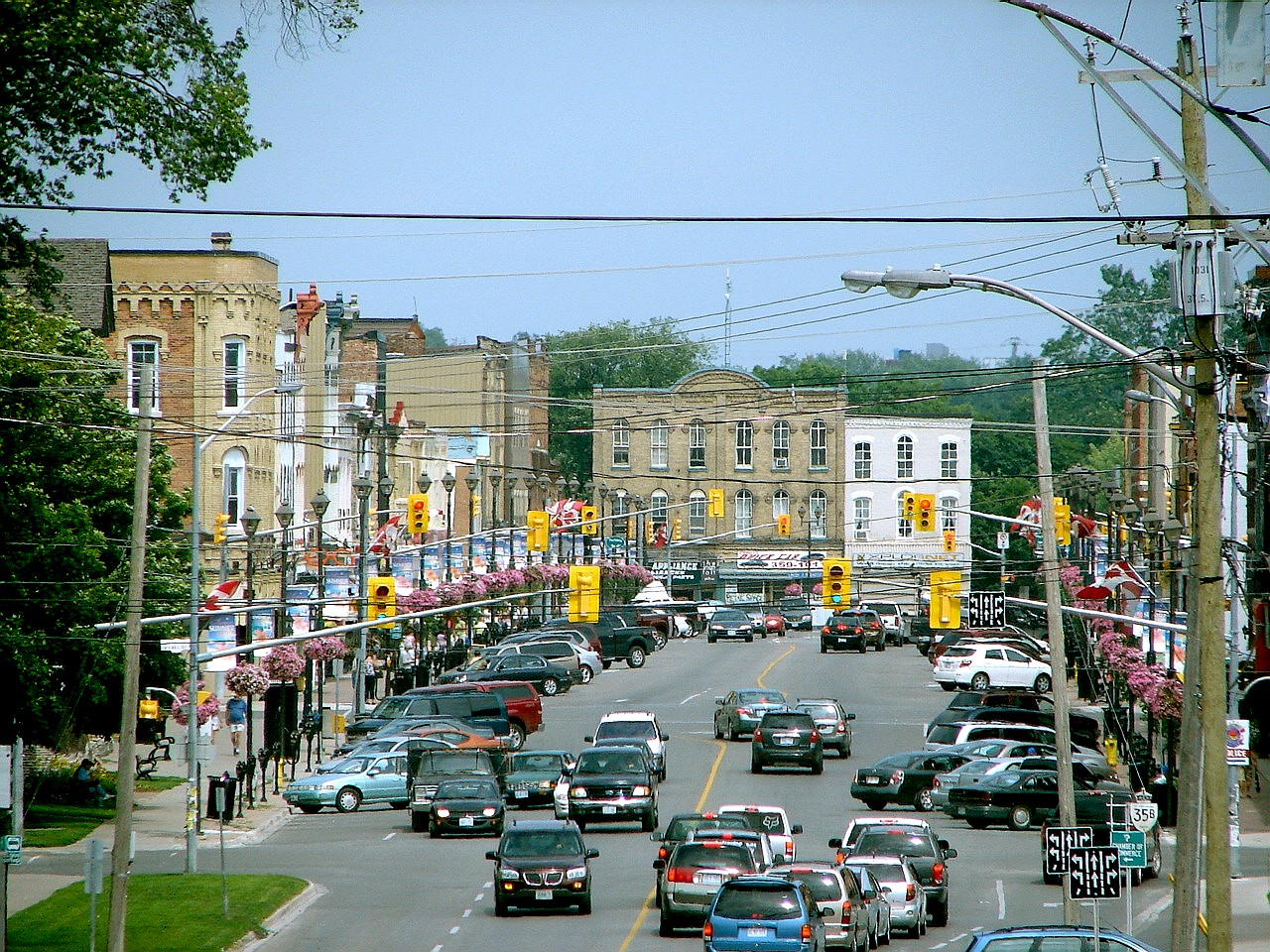
- Downtown Lindsay

- Location within City of Kawartha Lakes Location within Southern Ontario
- Coordinates: 44°21′19″N 78°44′38″W
- Country: Canada
- Province: Ontario
- Municipality: Kawartha Lakes
- Established: 1831 as Purdy's Mills
- Incorporated: 1834 as township 1857 as town
- Dissolved (amalgamated): January 1, 2001

Government
  - Mayor: Doug Elmslie
  - MP: Jamie Schmale (CPC)
  - MPP: Laurie Scott (PC)

Area
  - Land: 15.57 km^{2} (6.01 sq mi)

Population (2021)
  - Total: 22,367
  - Density: 1,436.7/km^{2} (3,721/sq mi)
- Postal Code: K9V
- Area codes: 705, 249
- Highways: Highway 7 Highway 35; Highway 36

Lindsay is a community of 22,367 people (2021 census) on the Scugog River in the Kawartha Lakes region of south-eastern Ontario, Canada. It is approximately 43 km (27 mi) west of Peterborough. It is located in the City of Kawartha Lakes, and is the hub for business and commerce in the region.

== History ==
The Township of Ops was surveyed in 1825 by Colonel Duncan McDonell, and Lots 20 and 21 in the 5th Concession were reserved for a town site. The same year settlers began to come to the region, and by 1827, the Purdys, an American family, built a dam on the Scugog River at the site of present-day Lindsay. The following year they built a sawmill, and in 1830, a grist mill was constructed.

A small village grew up around the mills, and it was known as Purdy's Mills. In 1834, surveyor John Huston plotted the designated town site into streets and lots. Local lore claims that during the survey, one of Huston's assistants, Mr. Lindsay, was accidentally shot in the leg and died of an infection. He was buried on the riverbank and his name and death were recorded on the surveyor's plan. The name Lindsay remained as the name of the town by government approval. Lindsay grew steadily and developed into a lumbering and farming centre.

With the arrival of the Port Hope Railway in 1857, the town saw a period of rapid development and industrial growth. On June 19 of the same year, Lindsay was formally incorporated as a town. In 1861, a fire swept through the town and most of Lindsay was destroyed with hundreds of people left homeless. It took many years for Lindsay to recover from this disaster. In the late 19th century, local photographers Fowler & Oliver worked out of the Sunbeam Photo Gallery. It was also the home to Sir Samuel Hughes, the Canadian Minister of Militia during the First World War. The Victoria Street Armouries were built during this time.

On January 1, 2001, the Town of Lindsay was officially dissolved and merged with Victoria County into the new City of Kawartha Lakes.

=== Railway ===
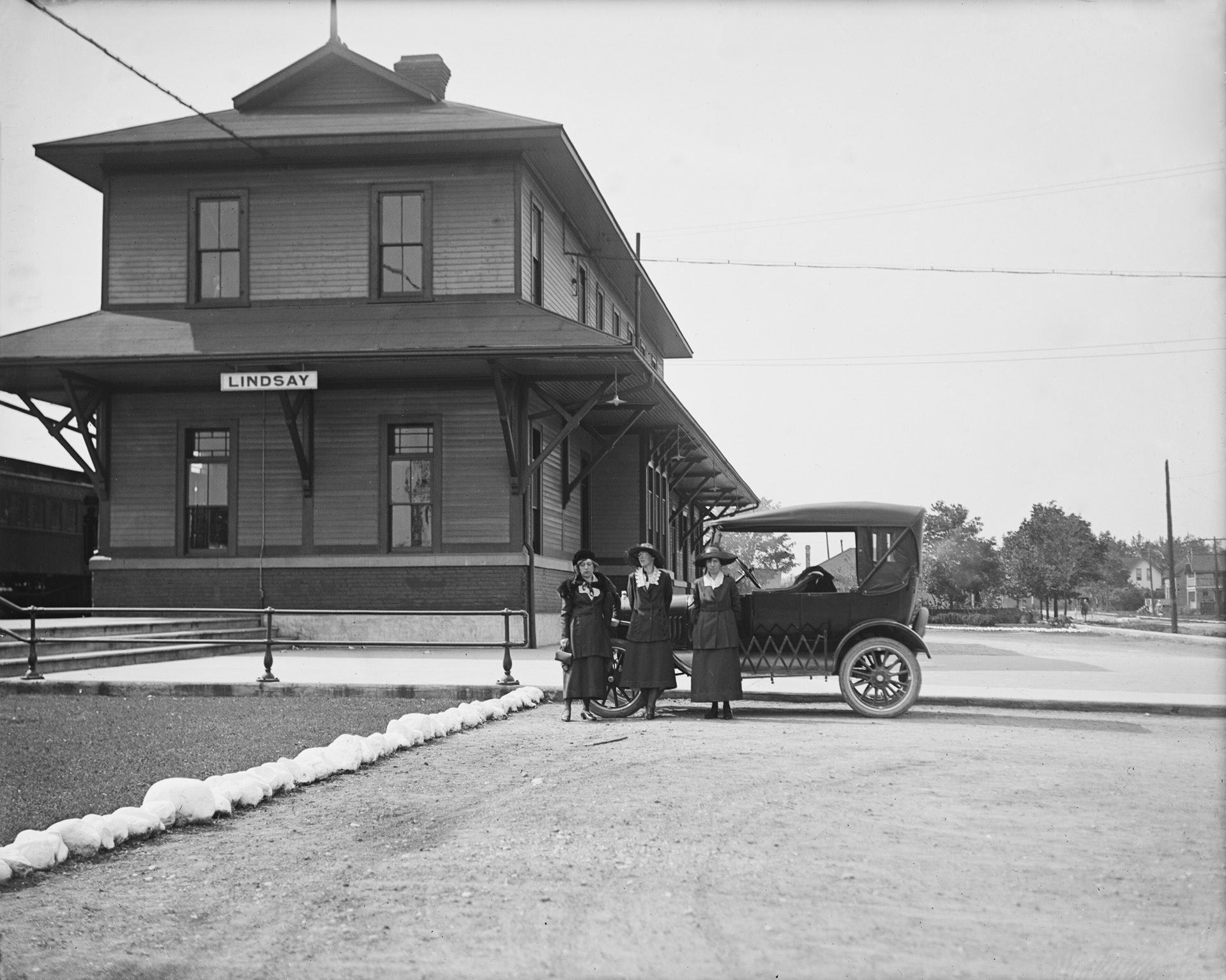
Lindsay railway station in 1921

The first railway to arrive in Lindsay was the Port Hope, Lindsay & Beaverton Railway (PHL&B), originally chartered in 1846 as the Peterborough & Port Hope Railway. The first train arrived at the St. Paul and King Streets station (Lindsay's first) on the east side of the Scugog River on October 16, 1857. In 1871 it continued on over the Scugog River across a swing-bridge, gained height on the west bank, and then headed west out to Beaverton. It was renamed the Port Hope Railway in 1869.

Lindsay's second railway began as the Fenelon Falls Railway in 1871, changing its name to the Lindsay, Fenelon Falls & Ottawa River Valley Railway, and then to the Victoria Railway. It reached and terminated at Haliburton in 1878. At its Lindsay end, it connected with the original Midland Railway route on William Street North at "Victoria Junction" in 1875, and its original Lindsay terminus was at the PHL&B/Midland station at St. Paul and King Streets. In 1877, it applied to the Town of Lindsay to extend its railway down Victoria Avenue to Glenelg Street to connect with the WPP&L (see below), where a brick station (Lindsay's second) was built on Victoria Ave between Glenelg and Melbourne Streets to serve the two railways as a union station.

Lindsay's third railway was the Port Whitby & Port Perry Railway, extended from Port Perry to Lindsay in 1876, reaching Albert Street, Lindsay on June 15, 1877 as the Whitby, Port Perry & Lindsay Railway (WPP&L).

In 1881, the Midland Railway acquired the neighbouring smaller railways and built two links important to Lindsay. One was between Wick (Blackwater) Jct., and Cresswell (Manilla Jct.) in early 1883 for a direct route between Lindsay and Toronto (hitherto via Lorneville Jct.); and the other ("the Missing Link") between Peterborough and Omemee in late 1883, for a direct Lindsay – Peterborough connection (hitherto via Millbrook Jct.).

In Lindsay, a new entry from Omemee was then decided upon, and a bridge was built over the Scugog River at the east end of Durham St. The track now came along just south of Durham to Cambridge Street, where it curved north to connect with the former Victoria Railway on Victoria Avenue. A new station (Lindsay's third) was built at the south end of William Street in 1883, at which time the King at St. Paul Street station was abandoned. The new station burned in 1885, and the former union station was taken back into use until 1890 when a grand new two-storey station was built (Lindsay's fourth), that lasted until 1963. The union station was demolished around 1890. A freight shed was built on the site, which was destroyed by fire in 1954. (It was replaced by another freight shed, demolished in 2006.)

In 1887 the Midland Railway made Lindsay its operational headquarters. A large freight yard was built south of Durham between Lindsay and Hamilton Sts, and the Port Hope engine house was dismantled and rebuilt in Lindsay as a running shed, together with the attendant shops, on the east side of Albert St. south of Durham. In the meantime the old swing-bridge across the Scugog River at Lindsay and Colborne Sts. was dismantled in 1887, and the former Midland Railway route across Victoria Jct. and through what is now the Lindsay airport was abandoned when the new direct line from Lindsay out to Midland was built in 1907. The Grand Trunk Railway (GTR) took over the Midland in 1884, and Lindsay became a division point for the GTR's 8th (Belleville, Peterborough and Port Hope), 9th (Midland and Coboconk) and 10th (Scarboro Jct., Whitby and Haliburton) Districts. The GTR operated a branch of The Grand Trunk Railway Literary and Scientific Society in Lindsay, including a full public library. The GTR was merged into the Canadian National Railways in 1923. (The Maynooth Sub. was added to Lindsay's control in 1931, then at its peak as a railway centre.)

In the meantime Bobcaygeon interests had applied for, and in 1890 obtained, a charter for the Lindsay, Bobcaygeon & Pontypool Railway (LB&P) from Burketon Jct. (west of Pontypool) on the CPR's then main MontrealToronto line, north to Lindsay. Construction began in 1901, and the line opened in 1904. The LB&P ducked under the GTR at the Scugog River bridge, following the east bank of the river to a station at Caroline Street (Lindsay's fifth). The last train to Bobcaygeon was in 1957.

To commemorate the 150th Anniversary, a monument was carved in front of the old town hall on Kent Street, by chainsaw carver Gerald Guenkel, of Omemee. It shows the importance of locomotives to Lindsay's history.

=== Forest fire protection history ===
Ontario's former Department of Lands and Forests (now the Ontario Ministry of Natural Resources) ran one of its 17 forest fire districts from Lindsay. Formed in 1946 The Lindsay Forest Fire District served as the headquarters for the protection and study of forests in Haliburton, Victoria, Durham, Peterborough and Northumberland Counties. The Lindsay office was also responsible for the maintenance and manning of the 13 fire tower lookouts within its boundaries. The towerman's purpose was as an early detection to protect the local forests from fire. The district's towers included: Harburn, Bruton, Eyre, Glamorgan (Green's Mountain), Harvey, Cardiff, Digby, Lutterworth, Sherbourne (St. Nora), Dorset, Clarke (Ganaraska Forest), Haldimand (Northumberland Forest) and Methuen (Blue Mountain). When a fire was spotted in the forest a towerman would get the degree bearings from his respective tower and radio back the information to headquarters. When one or more towermen from other towers in the area would also call in their bearings, the forest rangers at headquarters could get a 'triangulation' read and plot the exact location of the fire on their map. This way a team of forest firefighters could be dispatched as soon as possible to get the fire under control. Most of these towers were put out of use in the late 1960s when aerial detection systems were put in place.

== Geography ==
Nearby towns:

- Oakwood
- Little Britain
- Omemee
- Fenelon Falls
- Downeyville
- Dunsford
- Bobcaygeon
- Port Perry
- Peterborough

=== Climate ===
Lindsay is in a humid continental climate zone with warm, humid summers and cold winters.

On occasion the first snowfall occurs earlier than November, though the snow usually melts within a short period of time. Temperatures start to increase again in late February and summer weather lasts from late-June to mid-September.

Climate data for Lindsay (1981–2010)
Month	Jan	Feb	Mar	Apr	May	Jun	Jul	Aug	Sep	Oct	Nov	Dec	Year
Record high °C (°F)	11.5 (52.7)	11.5 (52.7)	24.0 (75.2)	29.5 (85.1)	32.0 (89.6)	34.0 (93.2)	36.5 (97.7)	36.5 (97.7)	32.5 (90.5)	27.0 (80.6)	21.1 (70.0)	17.5 (63.5)	36.5 (97.7)
Mean daily maximum °C (°F)	−4.1 (24.6)	−2.1 (28.2)	2.9 (37.2)	11.2 (52.2)	18.2 (64.8)	23.4 (74.1)	26.0 (78.8)	24.8 (76.6)	20.0 (68.0)	12.8 (55.0)	5.6 (42.1)	−0.6 (30.9)	11.5 (52.7)
Daily mean °C (°F)	−8.4 (16.9)	−6.8 (19.8)	−1.8 (28.8)	6.0 (42.8)	12.5 (54.5)	17.7 (63.9)	20.3 (68.5)	19.2 (66.6)	14.8 (58.6)	8.2 (46.8)	2.0 (35.6)	−4.4 (24.1)	6.6 (43.9)
Mean daily minimum °C (°F)	−12.7 (9.1)	−11.4 (11.5)	−6.6 (20.1)	0.7 (33.3)	6.8 (44.2)	11.9 (53.4)	14.4 (57.9)	13.5 (56.3)	9.4 (48.9)	3.5 (38.3)	−1.6 (29.1)	−8.1 (17.4)	1.7 (35.1)
Record low °C (°F)	−36.5 (−33.7)	−35 (−31)	−30.5 (−22.9)	−14 (7)	−4 (25)	−2.5 (27.5)	5.0 (41.0)	1.7 (35.1)	−3.5 (25.7)	−9.4 (15.1)	−18.5 (−1.3)	−34 (−29)	−36.5 (−33.7)
Average precipitation mm (inches)	66.8 (2.63)	54.9 (2.16)	55.7 (2.19)	65.2 (2.57)	87.3 (3.44)	82.6 (3.25)	75.8 (2.98)	85.7 (3.37)	88.2 (3.47)	76.6 (3.02)	89.8 (3.54)	68.5 (2.70)	896.9 (35.31)
Average rainfall mm (inches)	22.4 (0.88)	22.2 (0.87)	30.4 (1.20)	57.5 (2.26)	87.3 (3.44)	82.6 (3.25)	75.8 (2.98)	85.7 (3.37)	88.2 (3.47)	74.9 (2.95)	72.3 (2.85)	29.4 (1.16)	728.6 (28.69)
Average snowfall cm (inches)	44.4 (17.5)	32.7 (12.9)	25.3 (10.0)	7.7 (3.0)	0.0 (0.0)	0.0 (0.0)	0.0 (0.0)	0.0 (0.0)	0.0 (0.0)	1.7 (0.7)	17.5 (6.9)	39.0 (15.4)	168.3 (66.3)
Average precipitation days (≥ 0.2 mm)	17.2	13.4	13.0	13.8	14.7	12.4	11.0	12.2	13.6	16.1	16.5	16.0	169.9
Average rainy days (≥ 0.2 mm)	4.5	4.2	7.4	12.2	14.7	12.4	11.0	12.2	13.6	15.8	12.2	6.2	126.3
Average snowy days (≥ 0.2 cm)	13.8	10.4	7.2	3.0	0.0	0.0	0.0	0.0	0.0	0.58	5.6	11.1	51.6
Mean monthly sunshine hours	89.4	100.8	144.2	176.0	204.0	220.4	278.5	221.1	156.2	128.7	80.0	60.1	1,859.2
Percentage possible sunshine	31.1	34.3	39.1	43.7	44.6	47.5	59.3	50.9	41.5	37.7	27.6	21.7	39.9
Source: Environment Canada

== Demographics ==
Historical census populations – Lindsay (town 1857–2000; population centre 2001–present)

Year	Pop.	±%
1871	4,049	—
1881	5,080	+25.5%
1891	6,081	+19.7%
1901	7,003	+15.2%
1911	6,964	−0.6%
1921	7,620	+9.4%
1931	7,505	−1.5%
1941	8,403	+12.0%

Year	Pop.	±%
1951	9,603	+14.3%
1956	10,110	+5.3%
1961	11,399	+12.7%
1966	12,090	+6.1%
1971	12,746	+5.4%
1976	13,062	+2.5%
1981	13,596	+4.1%
1986	14,455	+6.3%

Year	Pop.	±%
1991	16,696	+15.5%
1996	17,638	+5.6%
2001	16,930	−4.0%
2006	19,361	+14.4%
2011	20,354	+5.1%
2016	20,713	+1.8%
2021	22,367	+8.0%

Population counts are not adjusted for boundary changes.
Source: Statistics Canada

== Culture ==
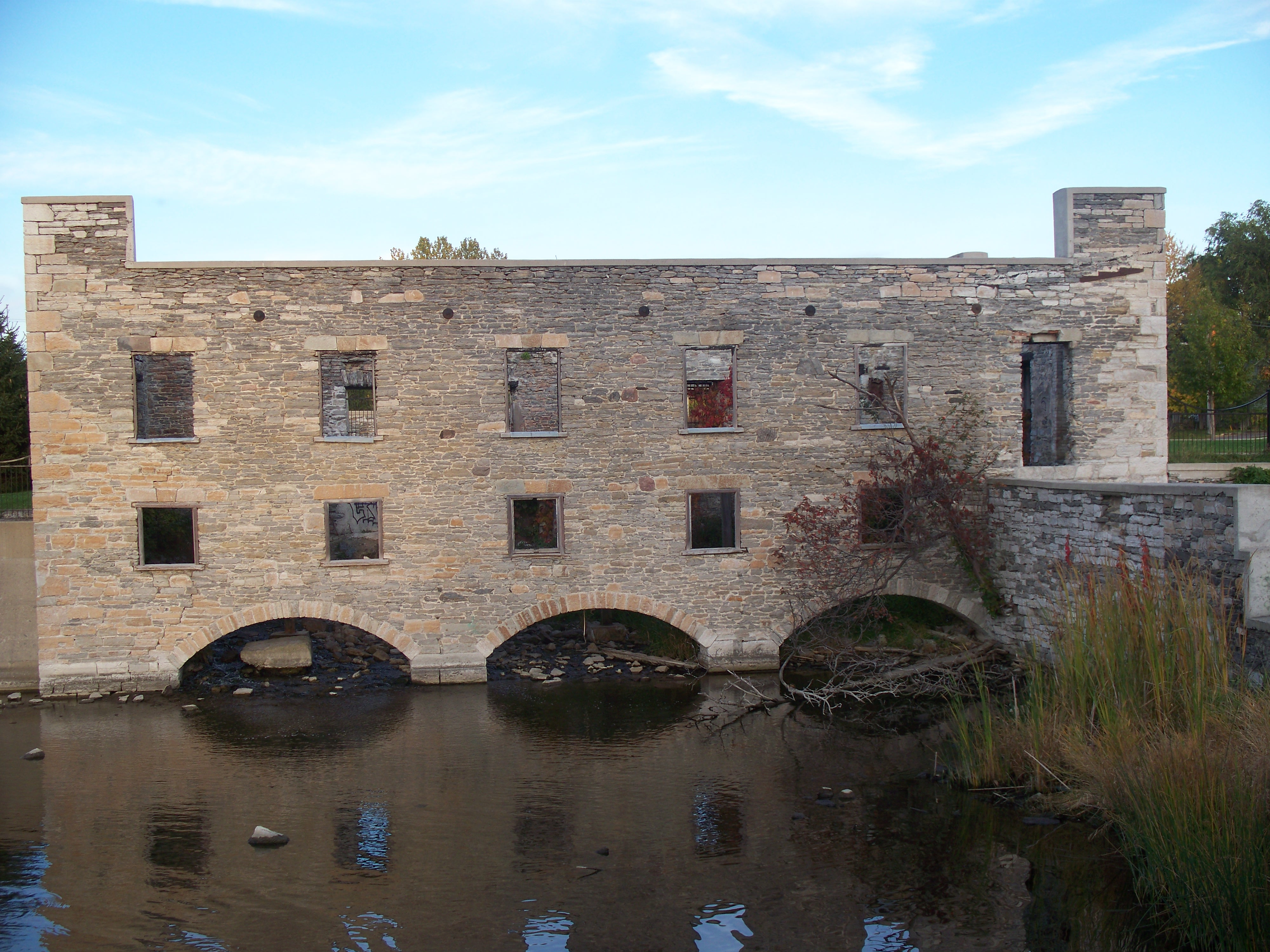
Lindsay's burnt down grist mill

Through direction from the Hockey Hall of Fame the history of the world's oldest stick was traced through the Lindsay Public Archives to verify the stick was carved between 1852 and 1856 by Alexander Rutherford Sr. of Fenelon Township near Lindsay. This stick sold for $2.2 million at an auction.

Scenes from the movies Meatballs (1979) and A Cool Dry Place (1998) were filmed in Lindsay. In 2001, Lindsay played host to an episode of the OLN Reality Series Drifters: The Water Wars as they passed through the Trent-Severn Waterway.

The Kawartha Art Gallery, located on the 2nd Floor of the Public Library, is the only public art gallery in Lindsay, and by virtue of amalgamation, the City of Kawartha Lakes. It is the steward of a permanent collection of over 160 pieces, including pieces by A. J. Casson, Jack Reid, Robert Harris, and Norval Morrisseau.

The Kawartha Lakes Museum & Archives, located in the former county jail on Victoria Avenue, is the only museum and archive in Kawartha Lakes that has a mandate to serve the entire city's population and interests and open year round. Collecting since 1957, it has exhibits that detail 19th century life in a rural county jail, businesses and people of Kawartha Lakes, as well as regular programming and events. The collection consists mainly of personal and private papers, photographs, and objects in the range of 50,000 total items.

Lindsay has a 150th anniversary song, entitled A Song For Lindsay. It was written and performed by recording studio owner Bob May, and local high-school student/vocalist Bethany Rees.

One of Lindsay's popular landmarks is the old burnt down mill. The mill, formerly named "Purdy's Mill" after William Purdy was burnt down in 1861 during a fire that happened around that time. After that, Walker Needer bought the land of what was there, and started to build the east wing of the mill. In the time it was there, many operations and companies were working in that mill, but on June 28, 1978; the vacant building was set on fire by three young boys and what was left is found at Old Mill Park.

== Infrastructure ==
The Ontario Ministry of Community Safety and Correctional Services operates the Central East Correctional Centre.

=== Healthcare ===
Ross Memorial Hospital is the only hospital in Lindsay. It was founded on November 20, 1902 by James Ross, who died on September 20, 1913. On April 14, 2005 the hospital finished a major renovation. A new dialysis unit was opened in 2008.

== Education ==
=== Colleges ===
- Fleming College

=== Primary and secondary schools ===
Trillium Lakelands District School Board operates secular public schools:

- I. E. Weldon Secondary School
- Lindsay Collegiate and Vocational Institute
- Parkview Public School – K-6
- Alexandra Public School – K-8
- Central Senior School – 4-8 (French Immersion)
- Jack Callaghan Public School – K-8 (formerly known as Ops Elementary)
- King Albert Public School – K-8
- Leslie Frost Public School – K-7/K-6 (French Immersion)
- Queen Victoria Public School – K-8

Peterborough Victoria Northumberland and Clarington Catholic District School Board operates public Catholic schools:

- St. Thomas Aquinas Catholic Secondary School (Lindsay)|St. Thomas Aquinas Catholic Secondary School
- St. John Paul II Elementary – K-8 (Catholic)
- St. Mary's Elementary – K-8 (Catholic)
- St. Dominic's Elementary – K-8 (Catholic)(French Immersion)

Private schools:

- Heritage Christian School – K-8 (Private)

== Media ==
=== Print ===
- The Lindsay Post was a twice-weekly newspaper (paid circulation Tuesdays, free Fridays) that is part of Osprey Media and owned by Quebecor Inc. (Sun Media) that operated as a daily until May 2007. Its history dates back more than 150 years Ceased operation on June 14, 2013.
- Kawartha Lakes This Week is a weekly newspaper owned by Metroland Media Group, a subsidiary of Torstar Corp. It publishes Thursdays, on a "volunteer payment" basis.
- The Lindsay Advocate is an online and glossy print magazine that began publishing in the fall of 2017. It added a glossy, monthly magazine in March, 2018. The Advocate states it is focused on the social and economic wellness of Lindsay and Kawartha Lakes.

=== Broadcast ===
CKLY-FM plays a classic hits format branded as Bounce 91.9. It was formerly known as 910 CKLY on AM.

Peterborough's Global Television affiliate CHEX-TV covers the region daily with its Newswatch news programs. The municipality also draws intermittent news coverage from CTV Toronto and A-Channel Barrie.

== Notable people ==
- Ruth Abernethy, sculptor
- Evangeline Lydia Emsley, nurse in World War I
- Bill Fitsell, Canadian sports journalist and historian
- J. Carson Mark, mathematician and physicist, part of the British Mission to Los Alamos for the atomic bomb program in 1945, head of the theoretical Division at Los Alamos in 1947, later outspoken against proliferation.
- Leslie M. Frost, Premier of Ontario from 1949 to 1961. First elected in 1937 to the Ontario legislature representing Victoria-Haliburton, he was known as "The Laird of Lindsay." He combined small town values with progressive policies to lead the province through the economic boom of the 1950s.
- Pearl Hart, outlaw
- Sir Sam Hughes, Minister of Militia for Canada during World War I, was born and raised in Lindsay.
- Isa Maud Ilsen (1868–1937), music therapist, nurse, lecturer, born in Lindsay
- Tyler Kyte, actor and musician, known for appearances in Instant Star and Popular Mechanics for Kids
- Joey Lawrence, commercial photographer behind the Twilight movie posters
- Anwen O'Driscoll, actress known for her role as Jaime in You Can Live Forever and Taylor Matheson in the Netflix series Burden of Truth, was born and raised in Lindsay.
- Fergus Patrick McEvay, former Catholic archbishop of Toronto
- Megan Park, actress best known for her role as Grace on Secret Life of the American Teenager
- Ernest Thompson Seton, artist, naturalist and writer of realistic wild animal stories. The Thompson family arrived in Lindsay in 1866 from South Shields, England. They resided in the home they built on Stony Creek until 1870, when Seton's father, Joseph Thompson, secured employment in Toronto as an accountant.
- Jack Tunney, best known as an on-air authority figure for World Wrestling Entertainment in the 1990s made his second home in Lindsay, and died there in 2004.

=== Athletes ===
- Carl Coulter, CFL player, won the Grey Cup with the Hamilton Tiger-Cats in 1999.
- Vince Dunn, ice hockey player for the Seattle Kraken
- Ron Ellis played for the Toronto Maple Leafs in the 1960s and 1970s, and was a member of Team Canada 1972 in the Summit Series.
- Bill Horton, ice hockey defenceman
- Alexander Overwijk, former basketball player and coach at Carleton University, was inducted into the Lindsay District Sports Hall of Fame.
- Joe Primeau played for the Toronto Maple Leafs in the 1930s.
- Matthew Rose, swimmer, competed at the 2004 Olympic Games in Athens.
- Other NHLers from the town include: Jeff Beukeboom, Don Maloney, Dave Maloney, Jamie Allison, Joe Junkin, Dave Roche, Rick MacLeish, Bill Speer, Vince Dunn, and Tom Thornbury.

=== Bands ===
- Three out of the four members of The Kents, an alternative rock band, are from Lindsay.
- The Six Brown Brothers, aka Tom Brown's Clown Band, a vaudeville-era saxophone band
- The Strumbellas, rock band from Lindsay
- SayWeCanFly, emo acoustic from Lindsay
