= Fenelon Falls =

- Village
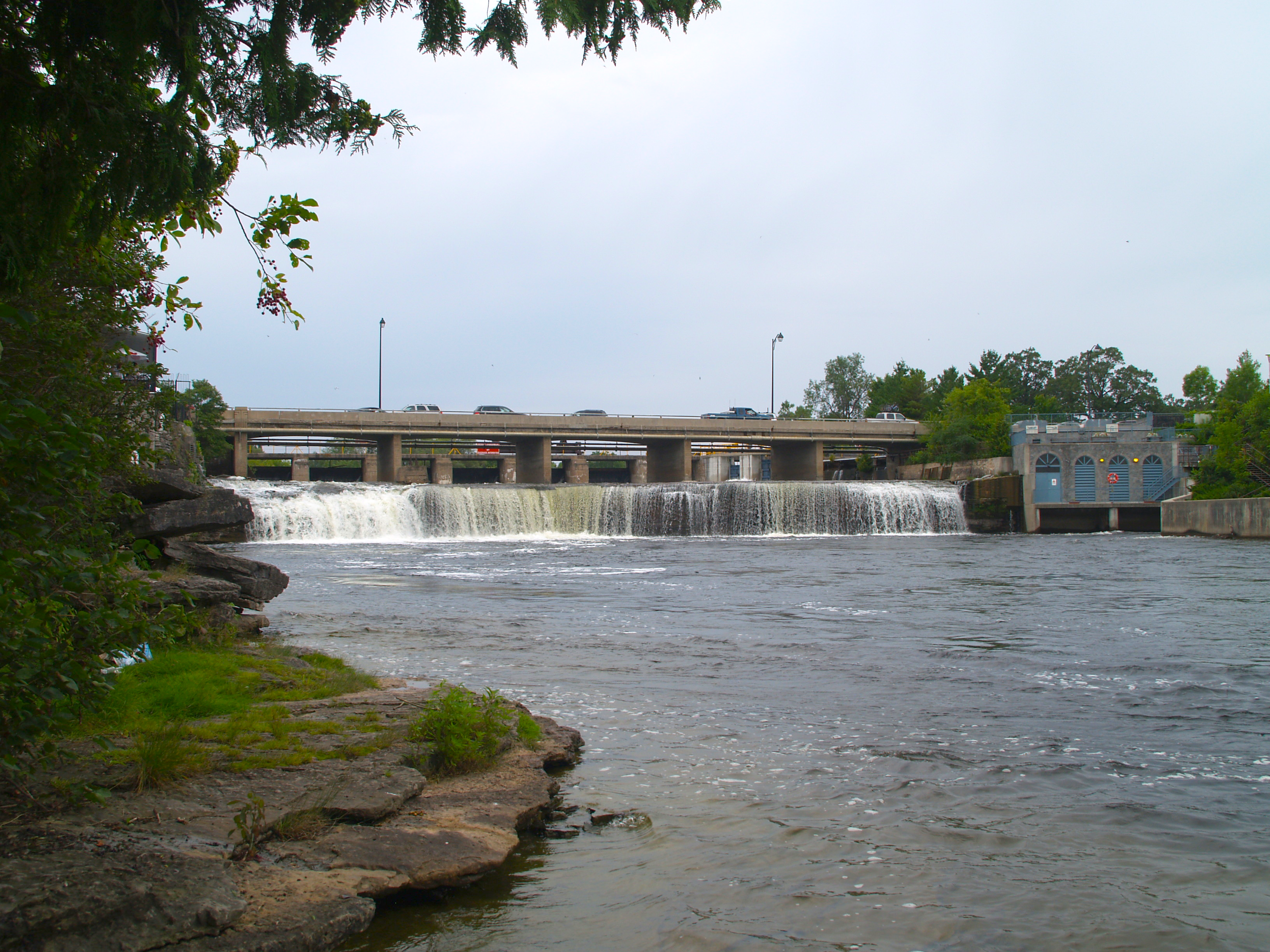
- The eponymous falls
- Nickname: "The Jewel of the Kawarthas"
- Location within City of Kawartha Lakes Location within Southern Ontario
- Coordinates: 44°32′08″N 78°44′13″W
- Country: Canada
- Province: Ontario
- Municipality: Kawartha Lakes
- Established: Unknown
- Incorporated: 1874
- Named for: Father Fenélon

Population (2021)
  - Total: 1,915
- Postal code: K0M
- Area code: 705

Fenelon Falls is a village in Ontario, Canada, part of the city of Kawartha Lakes. Nicknamed the "Jewel of the Kawarthas," it has a population of 2,500 permanent inhabitants, which swells in the summer due to tourism and holiday cottages. Fenelon Falls is home to lock 34 on the Trent-Severn Waterway between Sturgeon Lake and Cameron Lake. It is primarily a tourist town and therefore is most active during the summer season. The main street of Fenelon Falls is called Colborne Street.

The eponymous falls are hidden from plain view, because the main road crosses over the river just upstream; however, the falls are easily viewed from a nearby restaurant or from a path on the north bend of the Fenelon River. The falls power a hydro-electric dam, which diverts some of the water flow.

== History ==
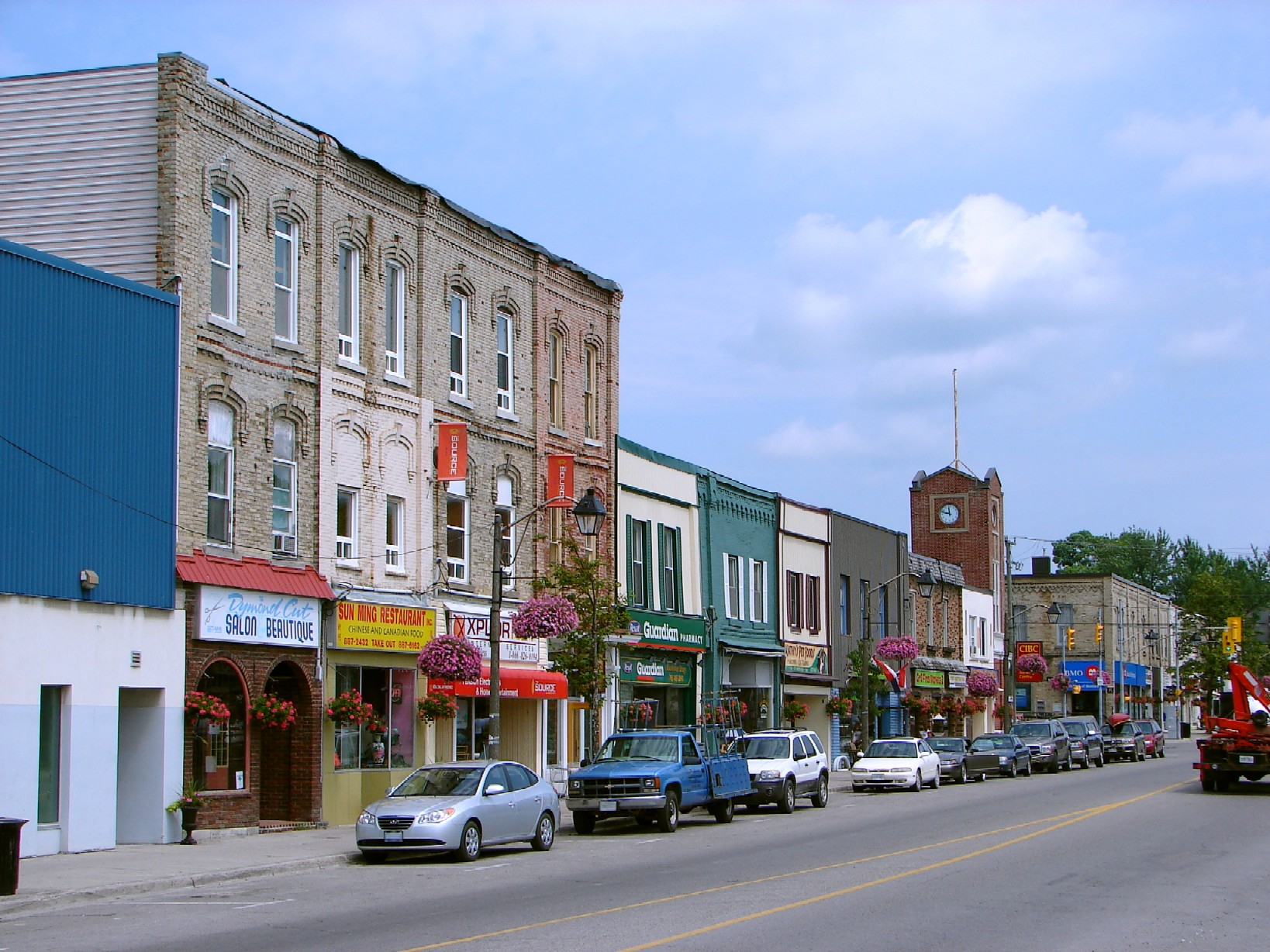
Fenelon Falls' main street

Fenelon Falls, originally named Cameron's Falls, was renamed after the township, which was named after François de Salignac de la Mothe-Fénelon (not to be confused with his more famous half-brother of the same name), who founded a mission on the Bay of Quinté.

The village of Fenelon Falls was incorporated in 1874. In 1876, the Victoria Railway reached Fenelon Falls. This line was taken over by the Midland Railway of Canada circa 1880, then absorbed into the Grand Trunk Railway (GTR) in 1893. In 1885, construction of the lock between Cameron and Sturgeon lake began. In 1923, CN took over the former GTR, operating the line until the burning of McLaren's Creek bridge near Lindsay in 1980 cut off the north end of the Haliburton Subdivision. In 1983, the line was abandoned with the track being removed by 1984. The line eventually became a public multi-use trail.

The Fenelon Falls Museum, open seasonally from May through October, is housed in the 1837 squared-timber home of James Wallis. Virtual Museum.ca, archived from the original on 2011-06-04

== Education ==
- Fenelon Falls Secondary School
- Langton Public School
- Fenelon Adult Education and Training Centre

== Notable people ==
- Raine Storey - Award-winning artist who grew up in Keswick before moving to Fenelon Falls
- Jenni Byrne - First female campaign manager for a winning federal party in Canada and former advisor to Prime Minister Stephen Harper was born in Fenelon Falls
- Emily Haines - Singer and songwriter grew up in Fenelon Falls

== Media ==
- The Fenelon Falls Gazette was the local newspaper, established in 1873 by E.D. Hand. It was last printed in December 2004.
- The Central Ontario Visitor (another local publication) was printed and released weekly with the Fenelon Falls Gazette between the months of May through October from 1985 to 1999.
- In 2001, Fenelon Falls played host to an episode of the OLN reality television series Drifters: The Water Wars as they passed through the Trent-Severn Waterway.

== Events ==
- Fenelon Falls is home to a night-time Santa Claus Parade called the "Santa Day Parade"
- Fenelon's Canada Day festivities and fireworks displays are held at Garnet Graham Park.
- Fenelon Falls hosted the annual Ride for Sight - Motorcyclists Fighting Blindness for a number of years in the early 1990s and again in the late 2000s at the Fenelon Fair Grounds, the latest being June 14–16, 2019.
- The Fenelon Agricultural Fair is held annually at the Fenelon Fair Grounds in mid-August, hosted by the Fenelon Falls Agricultural Society.
- The Fenelon Falls Agricultural Society also hosts other events at the fair grounds annually over the summer months, including a Car Show, Steam Show, Jamboree and Art Festival.
