= List of schools in the District Municipality of Muskoka =

There are numerous schools located in the District Municipality of Muskoka in Ontario.

English-language public education is run by the Trillium Lakelands District School Board and the Near North District School Board. English-language Catholic education is run by the Simcoe Muskoka Catholic District School Board in the west. French-language Catholic education is run by the Conseil scolaire catholique MonAvenir.

== Elementary schools ==
=== English public ===
- Bracebridge Public School, Bracebridge
- Glen Orchard Public School, Carling
- Gravenhurst Public School, Gravenhurst
- Honey Harbour Public School, Honey Harbour
- Huntsville Public School, Huntsville
- Irwin Memorial Public School, Dwight
- K.P. Manson Public School, Severn Bridge
- Macaulay Public School, Bracebridge
- MacTier Public School, MacTier
- Monck Public School, Bracebridge
- Muskoka Beechgrove Public School, Gravenhurst
- Muskoka Falls Public School, Bracebridge
- Pine Glen Public School, Huntsville
- Riverside Public School, Huntsville
- Spruce Glen Public School, Huntsville
- V.K. Greer Memorial Public School, Utterson
- Watt Public School, Utterson

=== English Catholic ===
- Monsignor Michael O'Leary Catholic School, Bracebridge
- Our Lady of Mercy Catholic School, Honey Harbour
- Saint Mary Catholic School, Huntsville

=== English private ===
- Muskoka Highlands Academy, Huntsville
- Muskoka Montessori School, Huntsville

== Secondary schools ==
=== English public ===
- Bracebridge and Muskoka Lakes Secondary School, Bracebridge
- Gravenhurst High School, Gravenhurst
- Huntsville High School, Huntsville

=== English Catholic ===
- Saint Dominic Catholic Secondary School, Bracebridge

=== English private ===
- Dewey Institute, Bracebridge

== Universities and colleges ==
- Georgian College Muskoka Campus, Bracebridge

== Alternative education schools ==
- Bracebridge Alternative Education and Training Centre, Bracebridge
- Gravenhurt Alternative Education and Training Centre, Gravenhurst
- Huntsville Alternative Education and Training Centre, Huntsville

== Other schools ==
- Muskoka Education Centre, Bracebridge
