= Nila Reynolds =

Canadian historian (1928–1999)

- Born: Nila Yvonne Morrison; March 13, 1928 West Guilford, Ontario, Canada
- Died: April 22, 1999 (aged 71) Durham, Ontario, Canada
- Occupation: Historian, author, columnist
- Education: Haliburton School of Fine Arts
- Subject: Haliburton County history
- Years active: 1968–1980
- Notable works: In Quest of Yesterday

Nila Yvonne Reynolds (March 13, 1928 – April 22, 1999) was a Canadian author, Haliburton Echo columnist and historian of Haliburton County.

Reynolds was the author of In Quest of Yesterday, a history book of the county, published three times.

== Background ==
Nila Morrison was born in West Guilford on March 13, 1928. Her father was a local politician and she grew up on a farm.

Reynolds received writing training from Sylvia Fraser, Scott Young and Austin Chesterfield Clarke at the Haliburton School of Fine Arts.

She married Leslie Bronte Reynolds (of the Brontë family) of Minden Hills. Nila Reynolds died in Durham, Ontario on April 22, 1999, at the age of 71.

The Leslie and Nila Reynolds Memorial Bursary is a $200 award given to post-secondary-education students of Haliburton Highlands Secondary School.

== Career ==
Her book Dream of Excellence documents the 1967 events that led to the founding of the Haliburton School of Fine Arts. The school was formed by a non-profit organization established by Ronald McCaw, Elizabeth Hobden, Carole Finn, Harold O'Neill, Dixie and Jan Augusteijn, and Rea Stinson.

Her 1979 book Bancroft: A Bonanza of Memories (published by the Bancroft Centennial Committee) documentary the history of Bancroft, noting that the name of the town is a result of the influence of senator Billa Flint. The book was recommended to history fans by journalist and publisher Barry Penhale. Penhale also described Reynold's book In Quest of Yesterday as "critically acclaimed." The book was originally published as series of columns in the Haliburton Echo newspaper before being developed into a manuscript. Reynolds undertook 170 extensive interviews as research for the publication. Kate Butler, director of the Haliburton Highlands Museum, described Reynold's approach to writing as unusual for her time due to the inclusion of human details in her historical archiving. The book was partly funded by the Haliburton Chamber of Commerce and the County of Haliburton. Leslie Frost (the former Premier of Ontario) wrote the foreword to the book, which was reprinted three times. The book's contents included details the West Guilford racehorse Guilford Boy, trained by Jimmy Powell, and the ruins of Gull Lake and Newnham.

== Publications ==
- Nila Reynolds, In Quest of Yesterday, County of Haliburton, 1968
- Nila Reynolds, Dream of Excellence, Haliburton Highlands Guild of Fine Arts, 1976
- Nila Reynolds, Carlow Township: Before the Memories Fade, Senior Citizens of Carlow Township, 1977
- Nila Reynolds, Bancroft, A Bonanza of Memories, Bancroft Centennial Committee, 1979
- Ed H. Devitt and Nila Reynolds, "Echoes of the Past" Resounding in the Present: A Brief Illustrated General History of a Central Region in Southern Ontario formed by Two Muskoka and Ten Haliburton Townships, Aljon Print-Craft Ltd, 1980
