= Haliburton Sculpture Forest =

Public sculpture gallery

Coordinates: 45.052°N 78.520°W

- Established: 2001
- Location: Glebe Park, near Haliburton, Ontario
- Type: Outdoor sculpture gallery
- Website: https://www.haliburtonsculptureforest.ca/

The Haliburton Sculpture Forest is an outdoor collection of sculptures located in Glebe Park near the village of Haliburton, Ontario, Canada. It is operated by the non-profit organization Haliburton Sculpture Forest et al.

== Exhibits ==
Opened in 2001, the forest has on display 38 sculptures by Canadian, Indigenous, and international artists. The sculptures are arranged along a series of trails in a maple forest on the shores of Haliburton's Head Lake. The Sculpture Forest is located in Glebe Park, hear Halliburton adjacent to Fleming College's Haliburton School of the Arts.

Facilities include tours, parking, picnic tables, ski and snowshoe trails; entrance is free.

Sculptures and benches (2001 to 2012 only)
Type	Number	Title	Medium	Artist	Year
Sculpture	1	The Homesteaders	Telephone poles	Jake Mol	2004
Sculpture	2	Pan	Granite	George Pratt	2003
Sculpture	3	Dreaming Stones	Granite	Kevin Lockau	2001
Sculpture	4	Guardians of the Forest	Bronze	Brett Davis	2004
Sculpture	5	Sound Vessel: Forest	Steel	Don Dickson and Amy Doolittle	2003
Sculpture	6	Beaver	Cement	Art Students of Haliburton Highlands Secondary School with support from Michael Belmore and Mary Anne Barkhouse	2002
Sculpture	7	Visionary - A Tribute to Sir Sandford Fleming	Steel and bronze	Richard Shanks	2002
Sculpture	8	Curled Figures	Cement	Susan Low-Beer	2003
Sculpture	9	Redwing Frond	Steel and acrylic	Darlene Bolahood	2003
Sculpture	10	Moose Scraps	Vintage farm equipment	Leo Sepa	2001
Sculpture	11	Terminus	Steel	Marianne Reim	2002
Sculpture	12	A Walk in the Wods in Haliburton	Limestone	Mary Ellen Farrow	2001
Sculpture	13	Embracing Eos	Steel and wire	Charles O'Neil	2004
Sculpture	14	Sleep of the Huntress	Rose Granite	Doug Stephens	2004
Sculpture	15	To Cut or Not to Cut	Granite	John Beachli	2006
Sculpture	16	C to C	Granite	John Shaw-Rimmington	2007
Sculpture	17	Shelter Shift	Wood	Phillip Vander Weg	2007
Sculpture	18	Shadow Caster	Steel	Ian Leblance	2008
Sculpture	19	Kennisis: Horse and Rider	Steel	William Lishman	2008
Sculpture	20	Fire and Ice: A Really Big Shoe	Steel wire and glass	Charles O'Neil	2009
Sculpture	21	Gelert	Bronze	Mary Anne Barkhouse	2011
Sculpture	22	A Conspiracy of Ravens	Steel	John McKinnon	2012
One-of- a-kind- Benches	A	Evolution	Stone and steel	Don Dickson and Amy Doolittle	2005
One-of- a-kind- Benches	B	Current	Oak and steel	Peter Wehrspann	2005
One-of- a-kind- Benches	C	Spirit of the Wild	Granite	Aaron Galbraith	

== Community partners ==
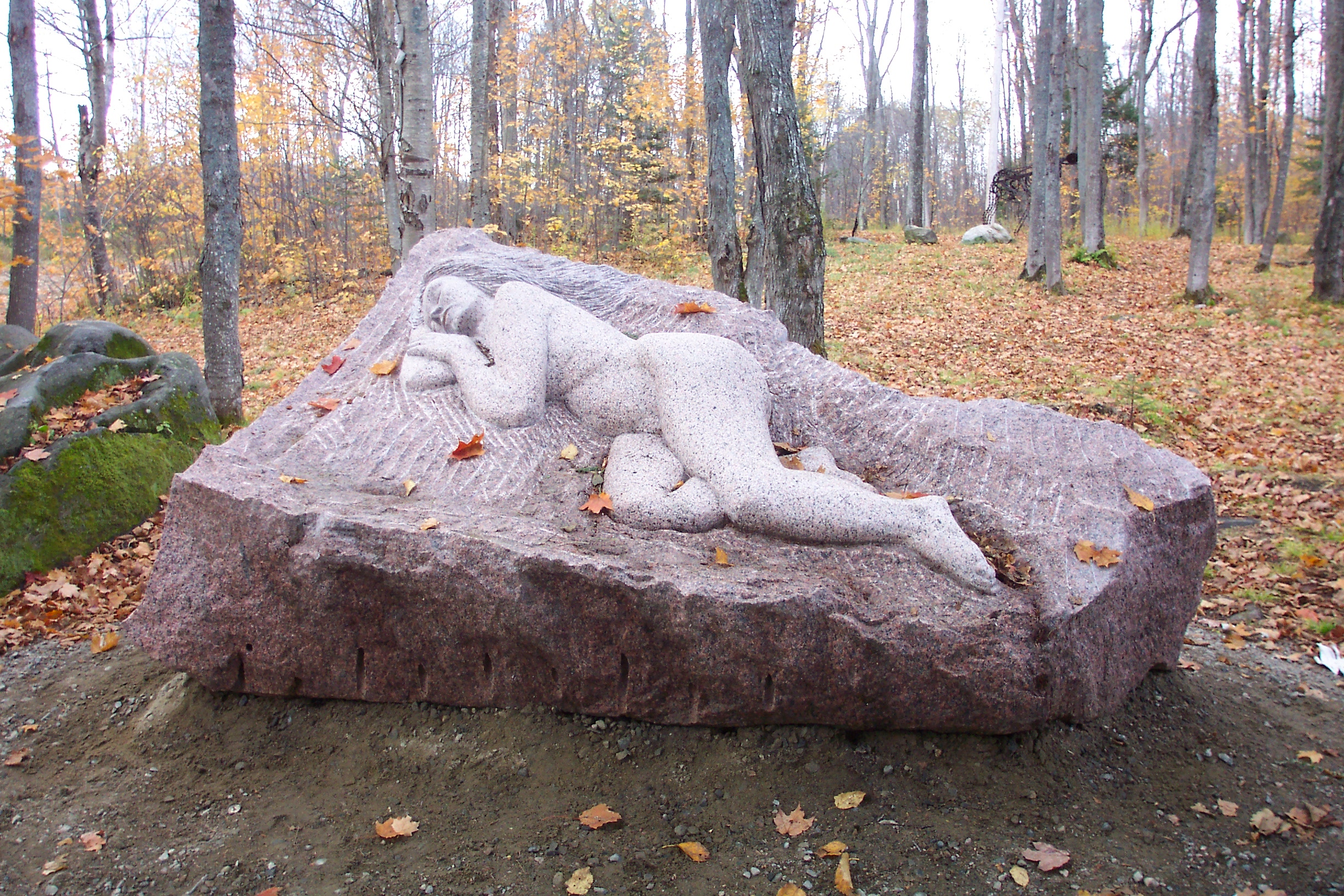
"Sleep of the Huntress" by Doug Stephens

Partners and sponsors include: Fleming College, Haliburton Campus, the Haliburton County Development Corporation, the Municipality of Dysart et al, Haliburton Highlands Secondary School, Haliburton Highlands Museum, Haliburton Highlands Trails and Tours Network, Haliburton Nordic Trails Association, Head Lake Trail Committee, Glebe Park Committee, and the Arts Council of Haliburton Highlands, in addition to community volunteers.
