= Ron Stackhouse =

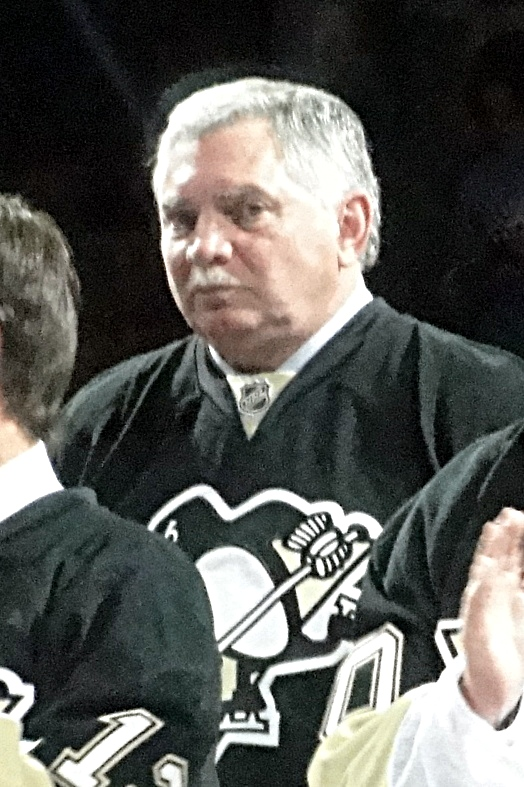
- Born: August 26, 1949 (age 76) Haliburton, Ontario, Canada
- Height: 6 ft 3 in (191 cm)
- Weight: 185 lb (84 kg; 13 st 3 lb)
- Position: Defence
- Shot: Right
- Played for: California Golden Seals; Detroit Red Wings; Pittsburgh Penguins
- NHL draft: 18th overall, 1969; Oakland Seals
- Playing career: 1969–1982

Ronald Lorne Stackhouse (born August 26, 1949) is a Canadian former professional ice hockey defenceman.

== Playing career ==
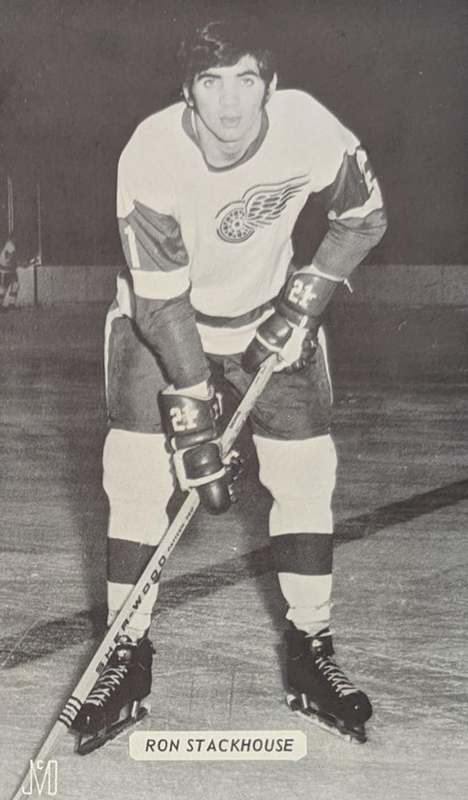
1970s postcard of Stackhouse for Detroit Red Wings

Stackhouse was born in Haliburton, Ontario. He started his career playing with the Peterborough Petes under Roger Neilson in the OHA. Stackhouse was drafted 18th overall by the Oakland Seals in the 1969 NHL Amateur Draft. He lasted only a few seasons with the Seals, before being traded to the Detroit Red Wings in 1971.

Stackhouse's career did not pick up until he joined the Pittsburgh Penguins early in 1974. He tied an NHL record the next season with 6 assists in a game by a defenceman, and reeled off seasons of 60 and 71 points. Stackhouse played with the Penguins until 1982, when he retired from hockey and returned to live in Haliburton, where he taught at Haliburton Highlands Secondary School.

== Awards ==
- Named to the OHA Second All-Star Team (1969)
- Played in the NHL All-Star Game (1980)

== Records ==
- Tied NHL record with 4 assists in one period (March 1975)
- Tied NHL record with 6 assists by a defenseman in one game (March 1975)

== Career statistics ==
=== Regular season and playoffs ===
			Regular season					Playoffs
Season	Team	League	GP	G	A	Pts	PIM	GP	G	A	Pts	PIM
1967–68	Peterborough Petes	OHA	49	13	9	22	88	5	0	3	3	20
1968–69	Peterborough Petes	OHA	54	15	31	46	52	10	6	4	10	41
1969–70	Providence Reds	AHL	65	1	5	6	37	—	—	—	—	—
1969–70	Seattle Totems	WHL	—	—	—	—	—	5	0	0	0	0
1970–71	California Golden Seals	NHL	78	8	24	32	73	—	—	—	—	—
1971–72	California Golden Seals	NHL	5	1	3	4	6	—	—	—	—	—
1971–72	Detroit Red Wings	NHL	74	5	25	30	83	—	—	—	—	—
1972–73	Detroit Red Wings	NHL	78	5	29	34	82	—	—	—	—	—
1973–74	Detroit Red Wings	NHL	33	2	14	16	33	—	—	—	—	—
1973–74	Pittsburgh Penguins	NHL	36	4	15	19	33	—	—	—	—	—
1974–75	Pittsburgh Penguins	NHL	72	15	45	60	52	9	2	6	8	10
1975–76	Pittsburgh Penguins	NHL	80	11	60	71	76	3	0	0	0	0
1976–77	Pittsburgh Penguins	NHL	80	7	34	41	72	3	2	1	3	0
1977–78	Pittsburgh Penguins	NHL	50	5	15	20	36	—	—	—	—	—
1978–79	Pittsburgh Penguins	NHL	75	10	33	43	54	7	0	0	0	4
1979–80	Pittsburgh Penguins	NHL	78	6	27	33	36	5	1	0	1	18
1980–81	Pittsburgh Penguins	NHL	74	6	29	35	86	4	0	1	1	6
1981–82	Pittsburgh Penguins	NHL	76	2	19	21	102	1	0	0	0	0
NHL totals			889	87	372	459	824	32	5	8	13	38
