= Severn Bridge, Ontario =

Community in Gravenhurst, Ontario, Canada

Coordinates: 44°46′N 79°20′W

Severn Bridge is a small community in the Town of Gravenhurst, of the District of Muskoka in the province of Ontario, Canada. It is located approximately 160 kilometres north of Toronto, on the Severn River, roughly halfway between Orillia and Gravenhurst. Its population was around 300 in 1992. It was founded in the nineteenth century. The village is served by important road, rail, water links and its postal services and rural route are handled in Washago, Ontario.

== Geography ==
Severn Bridge is located at 44.8° north, 79.4° west. It is located on the Severn River in Ontario. Geologically, it is located in the Canadian Shield. It is approximately 160 kilometres north of Toronto, roughly halfway between Orillia and Gravenhurst.

== History ==
Severn Bridge came into existence in the year 1858, when the Muskoka Road was surveyed and constructed from the head of navigation on Lake Couchiching at Washago Mills, to a crossing of the Severn River. The supervisor of the bridge's building was David Gibson, the Inspector of Crown Lands Agencies and Superintendent of Colonization Roads. By the end of that year, provincial land surveyor Charles Rankin was issued instructions to continue the road northward from the "Bridge" constructed across the River Severn. Work on the road resumed the following Spring. The settlement was officially given its name in 1861, when a post office was opened there. James H Jackson was the first postmaster and the first settler north of the river, having arrived there in 1858 .

In 1873, the Toronto, Simcoe and Muskoka Junction Railway reached Severn Bridge, but as a result of the panic of 1873, further construction was stalled. Two years later, this line was acquired by Northern Extensions Railway and upon completion of the line to Gravenhurst in 1875, was absorbed by the Northern Railway of Canada. The line was extended to make a connection with Canadian Pacific Railway near Lake Nipissing in 1886, by the Northern and Pacific Junction Railway, a subsidiary of the Northern. The entire route from Toronto to North Bay was subsequently purchased by the Grand Trunk Railway, (which in turn became part of Canadian National Railways).

In September 1906, many of the homes and businesses of Severn Bridge were destroyed by fire.

Between 1925 and 1927, the provincial government under the leadership of Howard Ferguson, created a road, known as the Ferguson Highway, beginning at Severn Bridge and extending to the Clay Belt of "New Ontario", it is now part of Highway 11.

There is a small hydroelectric dam in Severn Bridge. Like many of the communities around it, tourism makes up a significant part of the economy.

== Education ==
The school boards that serve Severn Bridge are the Trillium Lakelands District School Board (formerly the Muskoka Board of Education) and the Simcoe Muskoka Catholic District School Board.

Severn Bridge is home to K.P. Manson Public School, a primary school that serves grades kindergarten through grade 8. The school mascot is the cougar. K.P. Manson carries one of the highest ratios of computers to students in Ontario, complete with Internet access to each machine.

Catholic school students and public secondary students attend school outside Severn Bridge.

== Transportation ==
Severn Bridge is located on significant road, rail, and water transport links.

Highway 11, a historic Ontario highway, runs through Severn Bridge. There is a Greyhound Lines bus stop in Severn Bridge.

The Canadian National Railway's Newmarket Subdivision, originally built by the Northern Railway of Canada in the nineteenth century, runs through Severn Bridge (CN has abandoned its Newmarket Subdivision south of the junction with its Bala Subdivision in nearby Washago, a few kilometres to the south). The village is no longer served by passenger train, although before its closure in 2012, the Ontario Northland Railway's Northlander passed through Severn Bridge. Both the Northlander formerly, and Via Rail's Canadian stop at Washago.

Severn Bridge also lies upon the Trent-Severn Waterway, a navigable waterway. A portion of the Trent Canal connects with the Severn River near Severn Bridge, and the Couchiching Lock (Lock 42 in the waterway) is located nearby. This waterway is a significant recreational waterway in Ontario.
