= Fenelon Falls Secondary School =

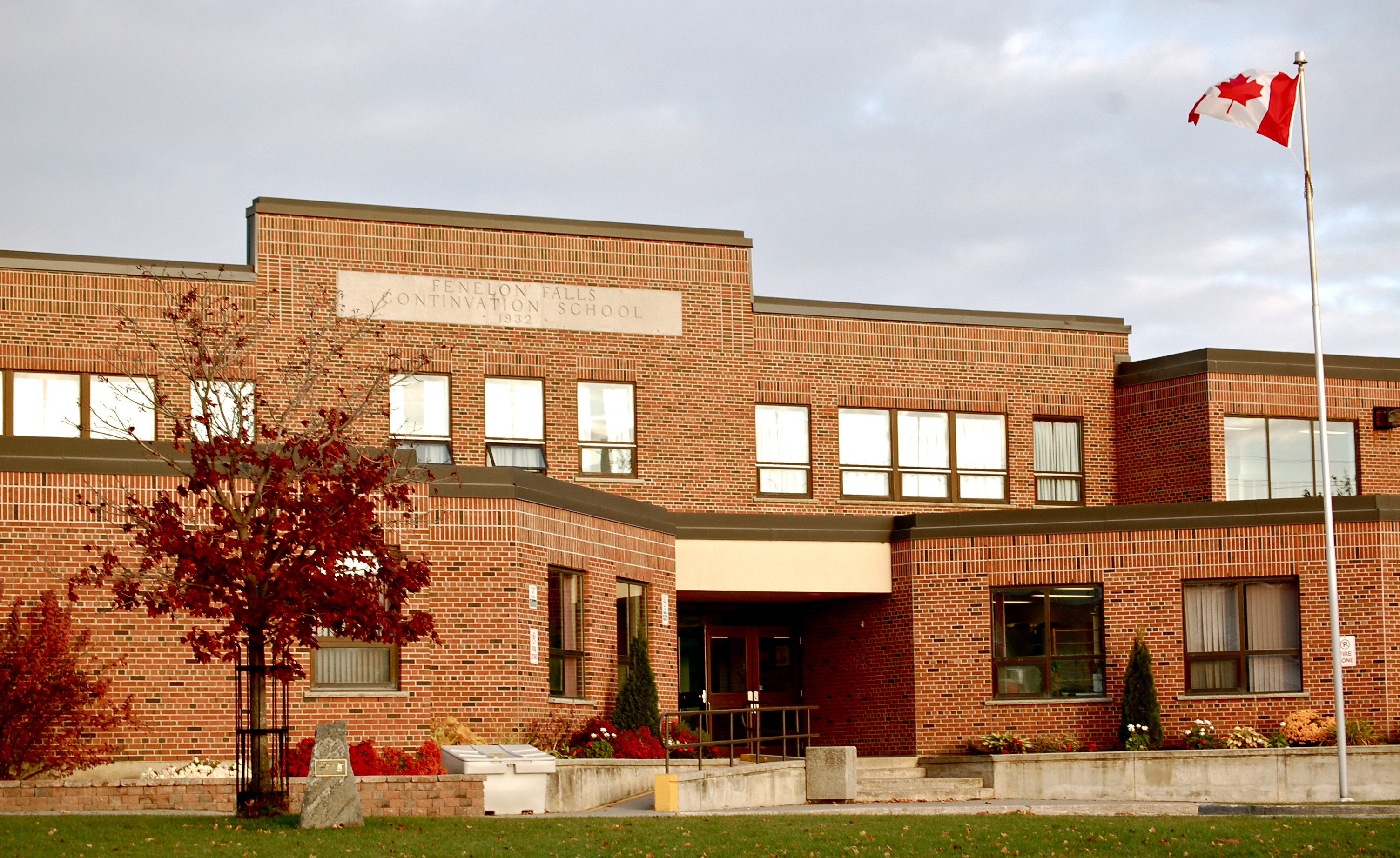

Location
- 66 Lindsay Street; Fenelon Falls, Ontario, K0M 1N0; Canada; 44°31′58″N 78°44′22″W

Information
- School type: Public, high school
- Motto: In Omnia Paratus (Prepared for all things)
- Founded: 1827; 199 years ago
- School board: Trillium Lakelands District School Board
- Superintendent: Dianna Scates
- Area trustee: Don Alton; John Byrne
- School number: 909700
- Principal: Christa Bradburn
- Staff: 93
- Grades: 9–12
- Enrollment: 726 (2015)
- Language: English
- Area: Kawartha Lakes
- Colours: Red, black and white
- Mascot: Farley the Falcon
- Team name: Falcons
- Website: ffs.tldsb.on.ca

Fenelon Falls Secondary School (FFSS) is a public high school located at 66 Lindsay Street in Fenelon Falls, Ontario, Canada. FFSS was founded in 1827. As of 2008, it has about 1,000 students and 90 teachers and support staff. It is a member of the Trillium Lakelands District School Board. It was previously in the Victoria County Board of Education.

== History ==
FFSS was founded around 1827 and the current school building is located on the south side of Fenelon Falls. Since its erection, the building has gone through a number of renovations, adding a new gymnasium and part of an art wing.

== Campus ==
The school consists of three floors, the third being the greenhouse and the associated classroom attached. Portables also serve as classrooms located just outside, at the back-right of the school. A large field and track are situated past the road behind the back of the school, available for physical education classes and sporting events, with nearby tennis courts providing for tennis-oriented physical education lessons.

== Notable alumni ==
- Linwood Barclay – columnist and author
- Jenni Byrne – political advisor
- Bruce McArthur – serial killer
- Emily Haines – Singer, songwriter, musician - Metric, Broken Social Scene, Emily Haines & The Soft Skeleton
- Avery Haines – TV personality/journalist - W5

== See also ==
- Education in Ontario
- List of secondary schools in Ontario
