= CJMU-FM =

Radio station in Ontario, Canada

- Bracebridge/Gravenhurst, Ontario; Canada
- Frequency: 102.3 MHz

Programming
- Format: country music

Ownership
- Owner: Bayshore Broadcasting Corporation

History
- First air date: August 7, 2018

Technical information
- Class: B1
- ERP: 23,000 watts

Links
- Website: www.country102.ca

CJMU-FM is a Canadian radio station which broadcasts country music at 102.3 MHz (FM) in Bracebridge/Gravenhurst, Ontario. The station is branded as Country 102.

== History ==
On October 7, 2016, Bayshore Broadcasting Corporation received CRTC to operate a new English language commercial FM radio station at Bracebridge/Gravenhurst on the frequency of 102.3 MHz with an average effective radiated power (ERP) of 22,000 watts. The station would broadcast a country music format.

On May 10, 2018, the CRTC approved Bayshore's license to increase the effective radiated power (ERP) from 22,000 to 23,000 watts and decreasing the effective height of the antenna above average terrain from 69.5 to 65 metres.

CJMU-FM began testing at 102.3 MHz in June 2018 and officially signed on August 7 that same year as Muskoka's Best Country - Country 102.

== Notes ==
The 102.3 MHz frequency in the Bracebridge/Gravenhurst area was previously used by an unrelated low-power tourist information station CIIG-FM which was launched in 2012 and moved to its current FM frequency at 98.3 MHz around the time when the new CJMU-FM signed on in 2018.
