= Bracebridge and Muskoka Lakes Secondary School =

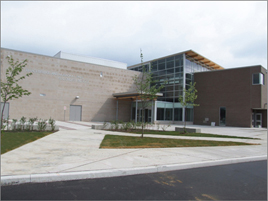

Location
- 100 Clearbrook Trail; Bracebridge, Ontario, P1L 2E9; Canada; 45°03′53″N 79°19′14″W

Information
- School type: Public, high school
- Motto: Nihil sine labore (Latin) (Nothing Without Labour)
- Founded: 1925
- School board: Trillium Lakelands District School Board
- Area trustee: Esther Childs
- School number: 895660
- Principal: Geoff Corbett
- Grades: 9 to 12
- Enrollment: 730 (2021–22)
- Language: English; French immersion
- Colours: Red, Black and White
- Mascot: Poseidon
- Team name: Lakers
- Website: bml.tldsb.on.ca

Bracebridge and Muskoka Lakes Secondary School is a high school in Bracebridge, Ontario. It serves approximately 730 students, grades 9 through 12, from Bracebridge and surrounding areas in Muskoka; attached to it is the Bracebridge Sportsplex and the Rene M. Caisse Memorial Theatre.

BMLSS is one of seven secondary schools in the Trillium Lakelands District School Board, and is one of only two high schools in Bracebridge; the other is St. Dominic Catholic Secondary School.

== History ==
BMLSS is located at School, Bracebridge, Ontario, in the same building as the Bracebridge Sportsplex and the Rene M. Caisse Memorial Theatre. The facility completed construction in August 2007; and was opened the following month. The theatre is open to all students, and is used regularly by the dramatic arts classes.

The facility was opened to replace the old high school, located in town, built in the early 1920s, as well as the old Bracebridge Culture and Recreation centre (the "Centennial Centre"), which was over 30 years old. The original high school was remodeled for residential use, while the Culture and Recreation centre was remodeled and became a Georgian College campus for Muskoka.

== See also ==
- Education in Ontario
- List of secondary schools in Ontario
