= Victoria County Board of Education =

The Victoria County Board of Education (VCBE) is a former school board in the Canadian province of Ontario. The board oversaw several schools in the Victoria County area until 1999, when it was amalgamated into the Trillium Lakelands District School Board.

== Schools ==
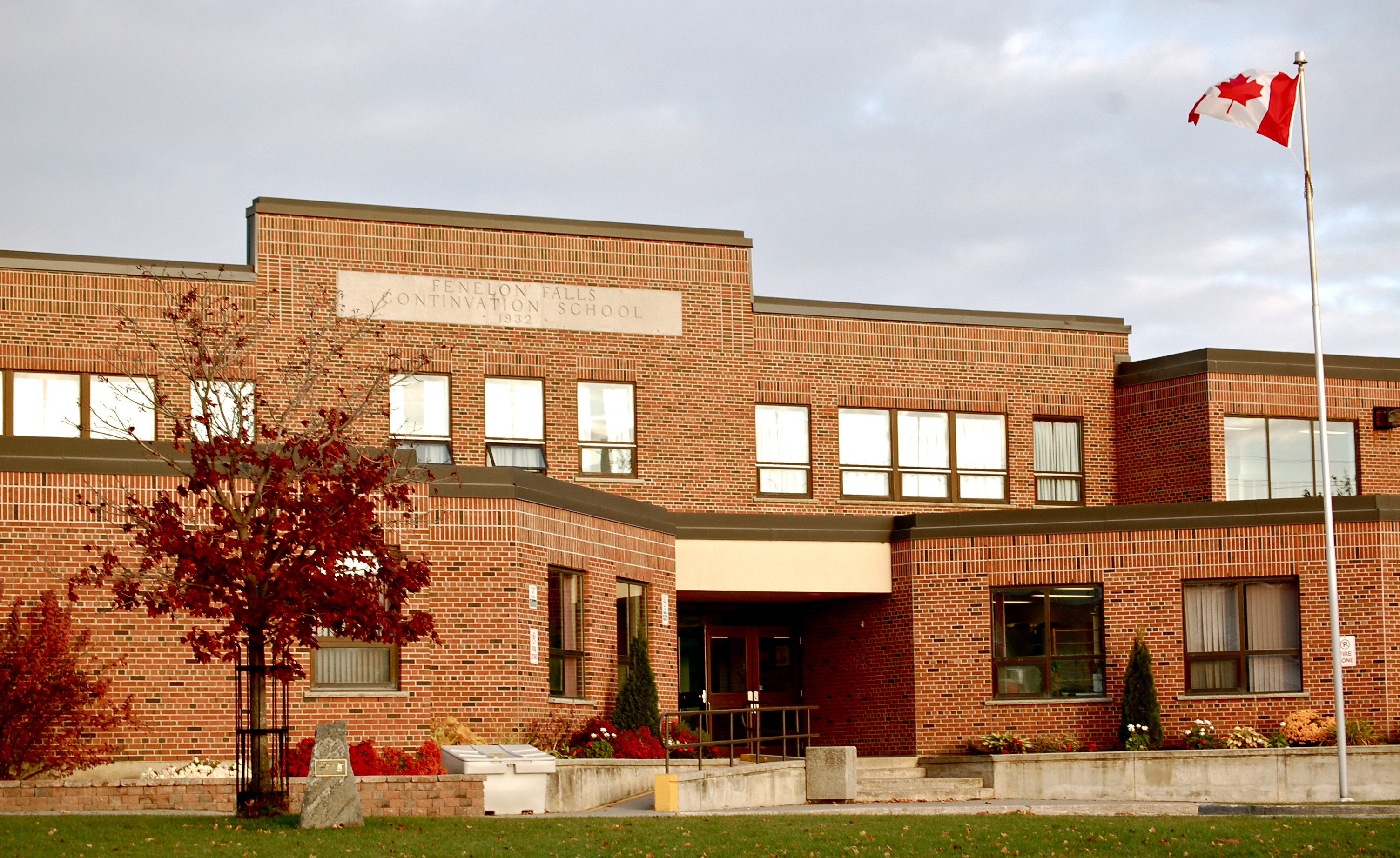
Fenelon Falls Secondary School

=== Secondary schools ===
- Fenelon Falls Secondary School
- I. E. Weldon Secondary School
- Lindsay Collegiate and Vocational Institute

=== Primary schools ===
- Central Senior School
