= Lindsay Collegiate and Vocational Institute =

Location
- 260 Kent Street West; Lindsay, Ontario, K9V 2Z5; Canada; 44.35322°N 78.74736°W

Information
- School type: Public Secondary
- Motto: Lampadia Eile Photes Allois Diadidomen
- School board: Trillium Lakelands District School Board
- Principal: Ray Este
- Grades: 9-12
- Language: English
- Colours: Red , Blue and Gold
- Mascot: Spartan
- Team name: Spartans
- Website: http://lcv.tldsb.on.ca/

Lindsay Collegiate and Vocational Institute, commonly referred to as LCVI or LC is a secondary school in Lindsay, Ontario.

On the event on his death Isaac Ernest Weldon, a local lawyer who had attended the school, left $1,000,000 to Lindsay Collegiate for student scholarships.

It is a part of the Trillium Lakelands District School Board. It was previously in the Victoria County Board of Education.

== Notable alumni ==
- Bill Fitsell (1923–2020) was a Canadian journalist, historian and founder of the Society for International Hockey Research
- W. G. Hardy (1895–1979), President of the International Ice Hockey Federation and Member of the Order of Canada
- Albert Edward Silverwood (b. February 15, 1876, d. December 2, 1961), founder of Silverwood Dairy
- Olivia Apps, olympic Rugby union player and Silver medalist

== See also ==
- Education in Ontario
- List of secondary schools in Ontario
