= Canadian Land and Emigration Company =

1861 English company

The Canadian Land and Emigration Company was an English company formed in 1861 to promote the sale of lands in the Province of Canada, most of which would later form the Municipality of Dysart et al in Haliburton County.

== History ==
=== Formation ===
In 1859, the Crown Lands Department in the Province of Canada (Note: at that time directed by Matthew Scott VanKoughnet) advertised a block of land for sale, comprising the townships of Dysart, Dudley, Harcourt, Guilford, Harburn, Bruton, Havelock, Eyre, Clyde, and Longford. The purpose was to promote rapid settlement of the newly created townships in the district through private enterprise.

The company, whose first chairman was Thomas Chandler Haliburton, (Note: whose name was given to the first village to be established within the Company's lands and later to the County of Haliburton.) was formed in April 1861 under the British Joint Stock Companies Act 1856, and acquired the above lands later that year, through the intermediary of an association formed by Richard Bethell, Samuel Gurney and George Lyall. (Note: Member of Parliament (MP) for Whitehaven 1857-1865, and son of George Lyall Sr.) Among its investors (who were approached by John Beverley Robinson to participate in the venture) were Sir Francis Bond Head, (Note: initially proposed as chairman, until he withdrew in favour of Haliburton) Henry Kingscote (Note: also a director of the South Australian Company) and Hugh Edmondstone Montgomerie. (Note: a ship insurance broker, and later a Chairman of the Company) Special legislation was passed by the Legislative Assembly of the Province of Canada in 1865 to facilitate the company's operations in the Province.

Lengthy negotiations were carried on between the company, and the Department of Crown Lands concerning the selection of townships and the terms of sale. The department agreed to pay for the survey of the outlines of the townships, but the company had to pay for the survey within the townships and their subdivision into lots.

Of the ten townships purchased by the company, Longford was located in the County of Victoria, while the others were then a part of Peterborough County. These, along with other townships of Peterborough County, Victoria County and Nipissing District, were incorporated as the Municipality of Haliburton in 1874, which later became the Provisional County of Haliburton.

Although the company wanted to appoint Edward Madan Miles as the surveyor for these townships, the Crown Lands Department preferred Brookes Wright Gossage, who, with other surveyors under his direction, began work in the townships of Dysart and Longford. At first, Gossage was in partnership with John Stoughton Dennis and later with Vernon Bayley Wadsworth. As many as sixty or seventy men were employed on the project at one time, and large sums of money were required for wages and provisions. When the survey was completed it showed 403,125 acres (1,631 km^{2}) in the ten townships of which 41,000 acres (166 km^{2}) was deducted as being swamp, leaving 362,125 acres (1,465 km^{2}) to be paid for at 50 cents per acre. Miles was later appointed to re-examine the surveys, and determined that the acreage fit for settlement was far below that estimated by Gossage, but the latter's figures were accepted by the department. However, later settlers' experience proved the accuracy of Miles' report.

=== Challenges ===
From the outset the company had difficulty in selling the lands. The distance of the townships from the settled parts of the province, the absence of good roads, (Note: the Peterson Road, which ran through the Company's townships, was being taken over by underbrush) the rough nature of the country, the Civil War in the United States, the Fenian raids on the border, the Long Depression of 1873–1879, and rival attractions of Western Canada, all combined to discourage sales.

From 1863 to 1870, a large number of emigrants came to settle in the region. By 1871, the company had sold 16,650 acres (67 km^{2}) to settlers and a number of town lots to various purchasers. Most of the company's profits were realized from the sale of timber. In 1872, the company built a road between the villages of Kennaway and Haliburton, and contributed to the cost of the connection of a telegraph line to Haliburton. In 1877, the company aided the construction of the Victoria Railway from Kinmount to Haliburton with the hopes of increasing settlement in the townships.

By 1883, the Province of Ontario had begun to open up neighbouring townships in Haliburton and Muskoka with offers of free land grants, (Note: following the passage of The Free Grants and Homestead Act in 1868) and the company found settlers were even more reluctant to purchase Company lands. The company was unable to cope with this competition. As a result, it was decided to offer for sale its complete holdings and undertakings in Canada. On April 11, 1883, the company appointed W.H. Lockhart Gordon (Note: a barrister in Toronto) and James Moore Irwin (Note: brother-in-law and cousin of Mossom Martin Boyd) to be its commissioners of affairs in the area. (Note: Irwin had been involved in lumbering in the area from 1877.)

=== Decline and dissolution ===
The company was involved in disputes with the Municipality of Dysart relating to valuations of its real and personal property, which led to a settlement in 1885 that was subsequently ratified by the Legislative Assembly of Ontario in 1887.

The company initiated winding-up proceedings in 1888, and was reincorporated by letters patent in Ontario as the Canadian Land and Immigration Company of Haliburton Limited in 1889. From 1890 to 1897 little activity took place. Sales of land and timber cutting rights had practically ceased. In 1895, Irwin declared bankruptcy and the bank (most likely the Canadian Bank of Commerce) took possession of his rights and interests in Haliburton, which included his shares in the new Company. In 1922, the company sold Bruton Township to the Hydro-Electric Power Commission of Ontario for $225,000, and proceeds from the sale allowed the company to buy back from the bank the timber cutting rights previously licensed to Irwin. In 1933, the company sold Clyde Township back to the Province for $25,000.

During the Great Depression, lumbering activities ceased once again, and financial difficulties resulted in liens being placed against the company's lands in Dysart. However, as more roads were constructed, the region began to develop as a tourist and vacation area, and land sales began to increase. At the outbreak of World War II, lumbering activities intensified, and carried on into the post-war years. By the end of 1946, all of the land originally purchased by the company had been sold. The company wound up its affairs, surrendered its charter, and ceased to exist.

== Sources ==
- Turner, Larry (1998). "Boyd, Mossom Martin". In Cook, Ramsay; Hamelin, Jean (eds.). Dictionary of Canadian Biography. Vol. XIV (1911–1920) (online ed.). University of Toronto Press.
- Read, Colin Frederick (1982). "Dennis, John Stoughton". In Halpenny, Francess G. (ed.). Dictionary of Canadian Biography. Vol. XI (1881–1890) (online ed.). University of Toronto Press.
- Murray, Florence B. (1976). "Miles, Edward Madan". In Halpenny, Francess G. (ed.). Dictionary of Canadian Biography. Vol. IX (1861–1870) (online ed.). University of Toronto Press.
- "Fonds: Canadian Land and Emigration Company collection (Accession Number: 77-023)". Trent University.
