= Dysart et al =

- United township (lower-tier)
- United Townships of Dysart, Dudley, Harcourt, Guilford, Harburn, Bruton, Havelock, Eyre and Clyde
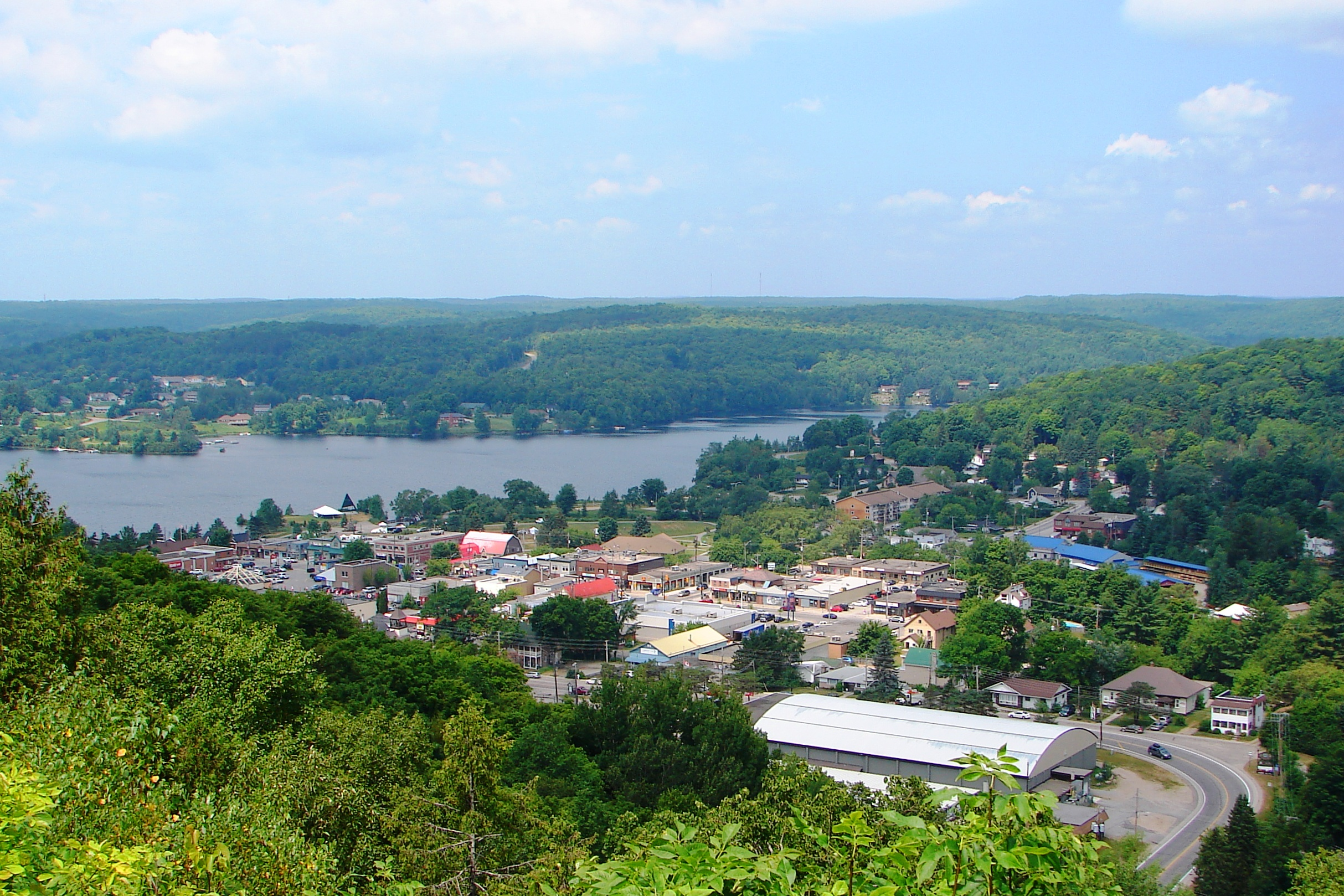

- Logo Coat of arms
- Motto: Confidently yet cautiously
- Location within Haliburton County Location within Southern Ontario
- Coordinates: 45°12′N 78°25′W
- Country: Canada
- Province: Ontario
- County: Haliburton
- Settled: 1860s
- Incorporated: January 7, 1867

Government
  - Type: Township
  - Mayor: Greg Bishop
  - Federal riding: Haliburton—Kawartha Lakes
  - Prov. riding: Haliburton—Kawartha Lakes—Brock

Area
  - Land: 1,474.22 km^{2} (569.20 sq mi)

Population (2021)
  - Total: 7,182
  - Density: 4.9/km^{2} (13/sq mi)
- Time zone: UTC-5 (EST)
  - Summer (DST): UTC-4 (EDT)
- Postal Code: K0M
- Area codes: 705, 249
- Website: www.dysartetal.ca

The United Townships of Dysart, Dudley, Harcourt, Guilford, Harburn, Bruton, Havelock, Eyre and Clyde, commonly known as the Municipality of Dysart et al, is a municipality in Haliburton County in Central Ontario, Canada. The original townships were of the Canadian Land and Emigration Company.

== Toponymy ==
At 61 letters or 68 non-space characters, the municipality had the longest name of any place in Canada for a long time. However, in 2010 it was far surpassed by the newly created local service district of Lethbridge, Morley's Siding, Brooklyn, Charleston, Jamestown, Portland, Winter Brook and Sweet Bay in Newfoundland and Labrador.

The municipality still has the status of longest place name of mainland Canada, longest place name of Ontario and second longest place name of Canada.

=== Etymologies ===
- Bruton was named in 1862 for Bruton in Somerset, England.
- Clyde was named in 1872 for Field Marshal Colin Campbell, 1st Baron Clyde.
- Dudley received its name in 1860. It may have been named for Dudley in the West Midlands of England or it may have been given in honour of William Ward, 1st Earl of Dudley.
- Dysart was named in 1860 for Dysart, Fife in Scotland.
- Eyre was named in 1872 for Major General Sir William Eyre (1805–1859), who served with distinction in South Africa.
- Guilford was named in 1861 for the Borough of Guildford in Surrey, England.
- Harburn was named in 1862, possibly after the River Harburn, a tributary of the River Dart in Devon.
- Harcourt was possibly named for Sir William George Granville Venables Vernon Harcourt.
- Havelock was named in 1859 for Major General Sir Henry Havelock (1795–1857), who served with distinction in India, Afghanistan, and Burma.

== Geography ==
Southern portions of Algonquin Provincial Park lie in Dysart et al in the geographic townships of Bruton, Clyde, Eyre and Harburn.

=== Communities ===
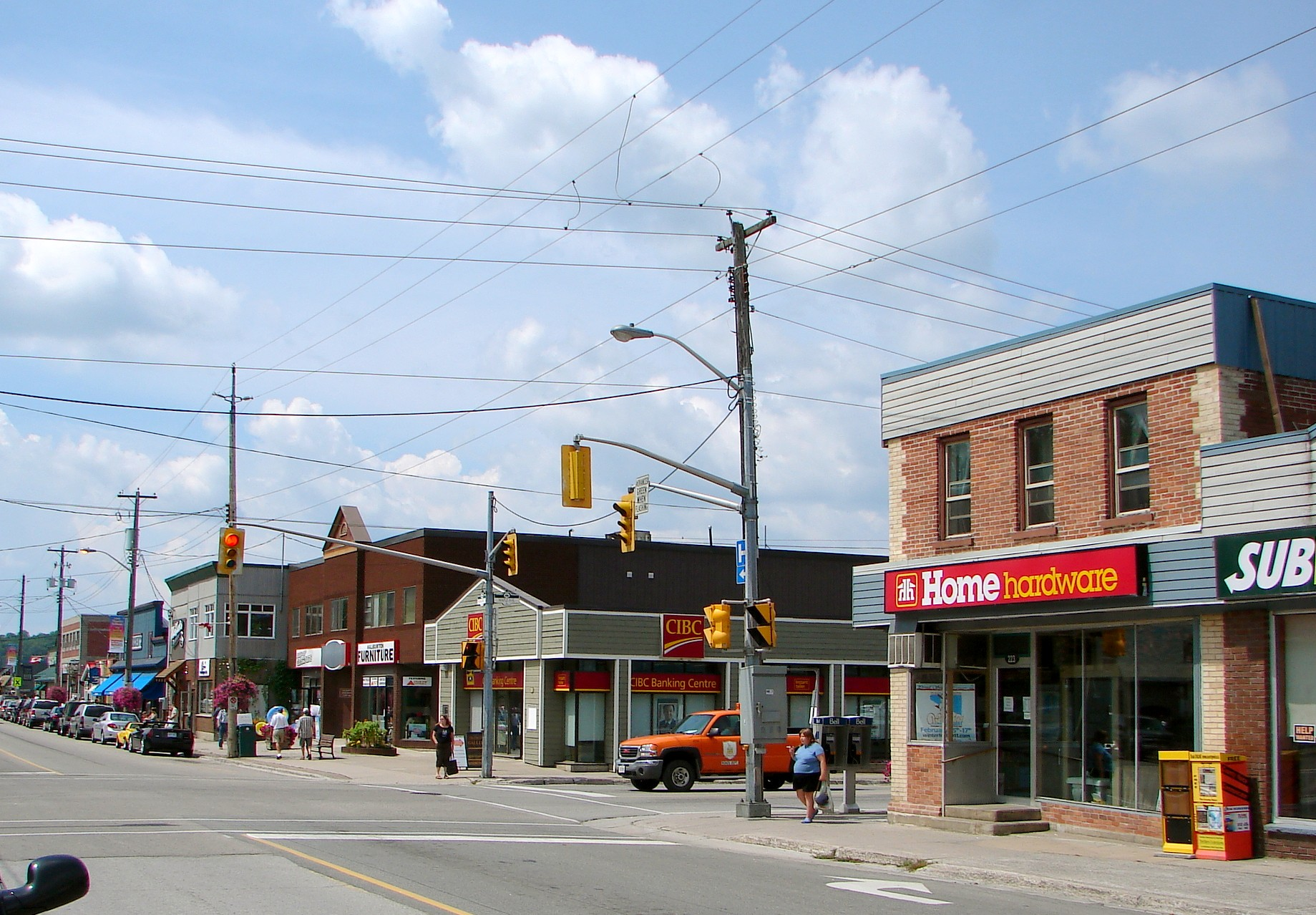
Haliburton's main street

The municipality's primary town is Haliburton (45°02′50″N 78°30′30″W), a community on Head Lake. Haliburton has a seasonal tourism-based economy. Some of southern Ontario's population retreats to central and northern Ontario "cottage country" for recreation and relaxation during the summer.

Haliburton Village and Haliburton County derive their name from the author Thomas Chandler Haliburton, who wrote the popular "Sam Slick" stories in the mid-19th century. Haliburton was chairman of the Board of Directors of The British Land and Immigration Company in England, who were responsible for developing most of the area before it became incorporated into a "Provisional County" in 1887.

The municipality also includes the smaller communities of Donald, Eagle Lake, Fort Irwin, Goulds, Harburn, Harcourt, Kennaway (ghost town), Kennisis Lake and West Guilford.

=== Climate ===
Climate data for Haliburton, Ontario (1991−2020 normals, extremes 1987–2020)
Month	Jan	Feb	Mar	Apr	May	Jun	Jul	Aug	Sep	Oct	Nov	Dec	Year
Record high °C (°F)	11.5 (52.7)	13.0 (55.4)	26.5 (79.7)	29.5 (85.1)	32.0 (89.6)	33.5 (92.3)	38.0 (100.4)	34.5 (94.1)	32.5 (90.5)	28.5 (83.3)	23.5 (74.3)	14.5 (58.1)	38.0 (100.4)
Mean daily maximum °C (°F)	−4.2 (24.4)	−2.3 (27.9)	3.1 (37.6)	10.3 (50.5)	18.5 (65.3)	23.1 (73.6)	25.3 (77.5)	24.4 (75.9)	20.3 (68.5)	12.7 (54.9)	5.1 (41.2)	−1.0 (30.2)	11.3 (52.3)
Daily mean °C (°F)	−10.1 (13.8)	−8.9 (16.0)	−3.4 (25.9)	4.0 (39.2)	11.5 (52.7)	16.6 (61.9)	18.8 (65.8)	18.0 (64.4)	14.0 (57.2)	7.5 (45.5)	0.7 (33.3)	−5.2 (22.6)	5.2 (41.4)
Mean daily minimum °C (°F)	−16 (3)	−15.4 (4.3)	−9.9 (14.2)	−2.2 (28.0)	4.5 (40.1)	10.0 (50.0)	12.2 (54.0)	11.5 (52.7)	7.7 (45.9)	2.1 (35.8)	−3.7 (25.3)	−10.4 (13.3)	−0.8 (30.6)
Record low °C (°F)	−43.5 (−46.3)	−40.5 (−40.9)	−34.5 (−30.1)	−18 (0)	−10 (14)	−2.5 (27.5)	2.0 (35.6)	−0.5 (31.1)	−6 (21)	−11.5 (11.3)	−25.5 (−13.9)	−38.5 (−37.3)	−43.5 (−46.3)
Average precipitation mm (inches)	97.5 (3.84)	71.4 (2.81)	76.1 (3.00)	86.6 (3.41)	91.7 (3.61)	98.1 (3.86)	91.2 (3.59)	94.3 (3.71)	98.9 (3.89)	101.6 (4.00)	103.2 (4.06)	95.2 (3.75)	1,105.8 (43.54)
Average rainfall mm (inches)	30.9 (1.22)	21.8 (0.86)	40.1 (1.58)	65.6 (2.58)	89.8 (3.54)	98.1 (3.86)	91.2 (3.59)	94.3 (3.71)	98.9 (3.89)	96.1 (3.78)	70.6 (2.78)	30.0 (1.18)	827.3 (32.57)
Average snowfall cm (inches)	66.6 (26.2)	49.6 (19.5)	35.8 (14.1)	21.1 (8.3)	1.9 (0.7)	0.0 (0.0)	0.0 (0.0)	0.0 (0.0)	0.0 (0.0)	5.4 (2.1)	32.6 (12.8)	65.2 (25.7)	278.3 (109.6)
Average precipitation days (≥ 0.2 mm)	17.3	14.0	12.1	13.2	12.6	11.5	11.2	9.9	11.9	15.2	16.0	17.4	162.4
Average rainy days (≥ 0.2 mm)	4.3	3.4	5.8	10.3	12.4	11.5	11.2	9.9	11.8	14.0	10.0	6.1	111.0
Average snowy days (≥ 0.2 cm)	15.2	12.2	8.3	5.3	0.69	0.0	0.0	0.0	0.04	1.9	8.3	13.8	65.7
Source: Environment Canada

== History ==
In the 1860s, the Canadian Land and Emigration Company of London, England purchased 360,000 acres (150,000 ha) in this part of Ontario for settlement purposes. The development was named after company chairman Judge Thomas Haliburton, a politician and the author of the Sam Slick stories. According to the historical book, "Fragments of a Dream: Pioneering in Dysart Township and Haliburton Village" by Leopolda z L. Dobrzensky, the first European settlers began arriving in Haliburton village in 1864. Key settlers included Captain John Lucas (1824–1874). Lucas co-established the first saw/grist mill and was later elected the first Reeve of Dysart. Captain Lucas, originally a native of Long Preston, Yorkshire, England, also established the first hotel in town that later became the Grand Central Hotel. Other important settlers included W. Ritchie, Alexander Niven, James Holland, John Erskine, the Heard family and Willet Austin.

Haliburton was the northern terminus of the Victoria Railway (ex Canadian National Railway Haliburton subdivision) from Lindsay. The first railway train to arrive in Haliburton was on November 26, 1878, with John Albert Lucas (1860–1945) as the train engineer. The railway was abandoned and the rails lifted in 1980. The station remains and is now home to Rails End Gallery and Arts Centre.

=== Fire tower history ===
The former Dysart fire tower was erected in 1956 on a hill by the east side of the village just off of Ontario Highway 118. Its 100-foot (30 m) frame still stands, but the cupola has since been removed. It was erected by Ontario's former Department of Lands and Forests (now the Ministry of Natural Resources) as an early detection to protect the local forests from fire. This tower was put out of use in the late 1960s when aerial detection systems were put in place. It was one of the County of Haliburton's many towers that were part of the former Lindsay Forest Fire District. Other towers included: Harburn, Eyre, Glamorgan (Green's Mountain), Harvey, Cardiff, Digby, Lutterworth, Sherboure (St. Nora), Dorset and Bruton. There were Department of Lands and Forests offices stationed in Minden, Ontario, Dorset and at St. Nora Lake (now the Leslie Frost Centre).

== Demographics ==
In the 2021 Census of Population conducted by Statistics Canada, Dysart et al had a population of 7,182 living in 3,341 of its 7,298 total private dwellings, a change of 14.4% from its 2016 population of 6,280. With a land area of 1,474.22 km^{2} (569.20 sq mi), it had a population density of 4.9/km^{2} (12.6/sq mi) in 2021.

Canada census – Dysart et al community profile

	2021	2016	2011
Population	7,182 (+14.4% from 2016)	6,280 (+5.3% from 2011)	5,966 (+8.0% from 2006)
Land area	1,474.22 km^{2} (569.20 sq mi)	1,485.98 km^{2} (573.74 sq mi)	1,483.51 km^{2} (572.79 sq mi)
Population density	4.9/km^{2} (13/sq mi)	4.2/km^{2} (11/sq mi)	4.0/km^{2} (10/sq mi)
Median age	59.2 (M: 58.8, F: 60.0)	57.2 (M: 57.0, F: 57.4)
Private dwellings	7,298 (total) 3,341 (occupied)	7,083 (total)	7,093 (total)
Median household income	$78,000	$60,848

References: 2021 2016 2011

Historical census populations – Dysart et al

Year	Pop.	±%
1921	1,737	—
1931	1,892	+8.9%
1941	2,280	+20.5%
1951	2,925	+28.3%
1956	2,820	−3.6%
1961	2,802	−0.6%

Year	Pop.	±%
1966	2,604	−7.1%
1971	3,063	+17.6%
1976	3,662	+19.6%
1981	3,695	+0.9%
1986	4,003	+8.3%
1991	4,856	+21.3%

Year	Pop.	±%
1996	5,380	+10.8%
2001	4,924	−8.5%
2006	5,526	+12.2%
2011	5,966	+8.0%
2016	6,280	+5.3%
2021	7,182	+14.4%

Source: Statistics Canada

== Culture ==
Dysart et al has an active cultural community including Haliburton School of Art + Design, Arts Council~Haliburton Highlands, Highlands Summer Festival, Highlands Opera Studio, Haliburton Highlands Museum, Haliburton Sculpture Forest, and Rails End Gallery & Arts Centre. The Haliburton International Film Festival (HIFF) is held each November at the Northern Lights Performing Arts Pavilion at the high school.

The Annual Haliburton Art and Craft Festival is held on the fourth weekend in July and is a signature event for Haliburton County with attendance of approx 7500 and over 100 artisans.

Haliburton appears as a significant setting in Canadian literature. Examples include Richard Pope's Me n Len – Life in the Haliburton Bush 1900–1940 and Robert Rotenberg's Old City Hall.

Scenes from the movie Meatballs (1979) were filmed at Camp White Pine, Haliburton.

== Education ==
The County of Haliburton is part of the Trillium Lakelands District School Board.

Elementary:

- Stuart W. Baker Elementary School (French Immersion): Grades K–4
- J. Douglas Hodgson Elementary School: Grades 4–8

Secondary:

- Haliburton Highlands Secondary School

Post-Secondary:

- Fleming College – Haliburton School of Art + Design

Adult Education:

- Highlands Adult Education and Training Centre
- Fleming College Academic Upgrading

== Media ==
Dysart et al is served by two newspapers, The Haliburton Echo and The Highlander, and two radio stations, 100.9 Canoe FM and 93.5 The Moose.

== Notable people ==
- Matt Duchene – NHL and Team Canada Hockey Player, drafted third overall in the 2009 National Hockey League Entry Draft by the Colorado Avalanche. Was third in Calder Memorial Trophy voting after the 2009–10 season, behind Tyler Myers of the Buffalo Sabres and Jimmy Howard of the Detroit Red Wings.
- Cody Hodgson – NHL hockey player drafted from the OHL's Brampton Battalion, selected tenth overall by the Vancouver Canucks in the 2008 National Hockey League Entry Draft, grew up in Haliburton
- Howie Lockhart – Born April 22, 1897, in North Bay, Ontario, Canada. Was a Canadian professional ice hockey goaltender who played five seasons in the National Hockey League for the Toronto St. Pats, Quebec Bulldogs, Hamilton Tigers and Boston Bruins. Lockhart was a resident of Haliburton and died there on August 2, 1956.
- Bernie Nicholls – From West Guilford, Nicholls played 18 seasons in the National Hockey League with the Los Angeles Kings, New York Rangers, Edmonton Oilers, New Jersey Devils, Chicago Blackhawks and San Jose Sharks.
- Nila Reynolds, historian and author
- Ron Stackhouse – From Haliburton, Stackhouse played 12 seasons in the National Hockey League with the California Golden Seals, Detroit Red Wings and Pittsburgh Penguins.

The local arena has mural paintings of Duchene, Hodgson, Nicholls, Stackhouse and Mike Bradley on the outside wall.

== See also ==
- List of municipalities in Ontario
- List of townships in Ontario
