= Barry Penhale =

Canadian historian and publisher

Barry Lloyd Penhale is an Ontario historian and publisher.

== Career ==
Penhale has worked as a journalist and a publisher, initially working as a sports broadcaster and later working for the Canadian Broadcasting Corporation and TVO. Penhale was a pioneer of Canadian wrestling journalism writing for Wrestling as You Like It magazine, broadcasting a weekly radio show, and also a television show for Northland Wrestling. Later in his career, he presented Sketches of Our Town, a television show with 32 episodes.

Penhale founded Natural Heritage Books before it merged into Dundurn Press. In the 1960s, Penhale launched The Outdoorsman magazine.

In 2019, he was awarded the 2018 Ontario Historical Society's Lifetime Achievement Award. He is a recipient of the Queen’s Diamond Jubilee Medal, and in 2016, was given the Ontario Black History Society’s Harriet Tubman Award.

=== Publications ===
- A Stringerful of Memories, Highway Book Shop, 1976, ISBN 9780889541030
- Grassroots Artisans (as editor), 1982, ISBN 0-920474-24-1
- Along the trail in Algonquin Park with Ralph Bice (editor), 1982
- Canadian Wrestling Illustrated

== Family ==
Penhale was the father of Nancy Hopkins, publisher of Country Roads, Discovering Hastings County magazine. Hopkins died in 2021.
