= Bracebridge, Ontario =

Bracebridge
- Town (lower-tier)
- Town of Bracebridge
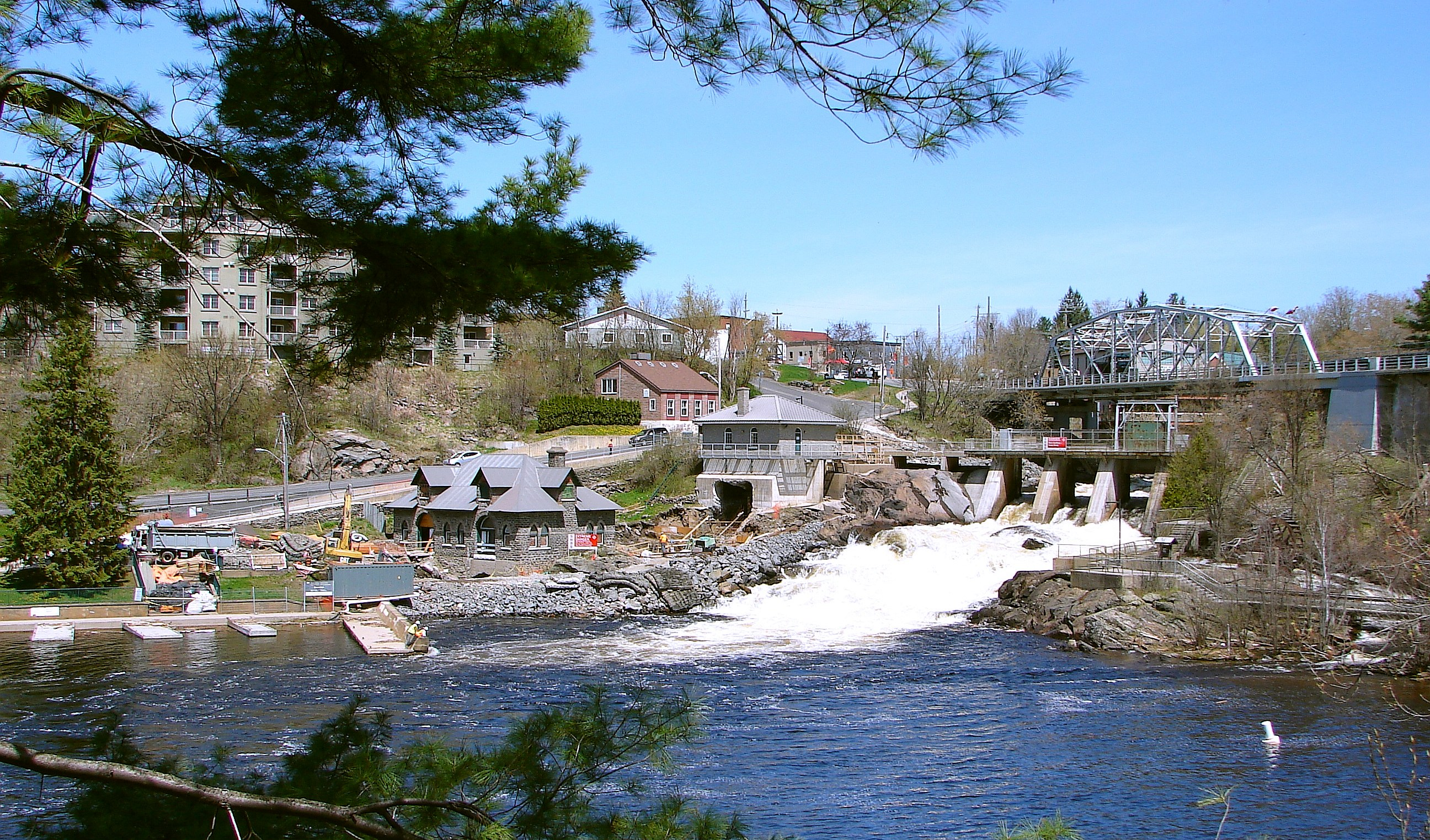
- Motto: The Heart of Muskoka
- Location within Southern Ontario
- Coordinates: 45°02′N 79°18′W
- Country: Canada
- Province: Ontario
- District: Muskoka
- Incorporated: 1875 (village)
- Incorporated: 1889 (town)

Government
  - Mayor: Rick Maloney
  - Governing Body: Bracebridge Town Council
  - Fed. riding: Parry Sound-Muskoka
  - Prov. riding: Parry Sound—Muskoka

Area
  - Land: 615.20 km^{2} (237.53 sq mi)
  - Urban: 13.38 km^{2} (5.17 sq mi)

Population (2021)
  - Total: 17,305
  - Density: 28.1/km^{2} (73/sq mi)
  - Urban: 9,884
  - Urban density: 738.5/km^{2} (1,913/sq mi)
- Time zone: UTC−5 (EST)
  - Summer (DST): UTC−4 (EDT)
- Postal code FSA: P1L
- Area codes: 705, 249, and 683
- Highways: Highway 11; Highway 118
- Website: www.bracebridge.ca

Bracebridge is a town and the seat of the District Municipality of Muskoka in Ontario, Canada.

The town was built around a waterfall on the Muskoka River in the centre of town and is known for its other nearby waterfalls (Wilson's Falls, High Falls, etc.). It was first incorporated in 1875 and celebrated the town's 150-year-anniversary in 2025.

The town is the seat of the district government and a centre of tourism for the Muskoka area and has several historical sites, such as the Clock Tower, Woodchester Villa, and the Silver Bridge, which joins Manitoba Street with Ecclestone Drive. The Silver Bridge was repaired in 2002, and is currently out of service and undergoing rehabilitation that is set to conclude in the fourth quarter of 2026.

== History ==
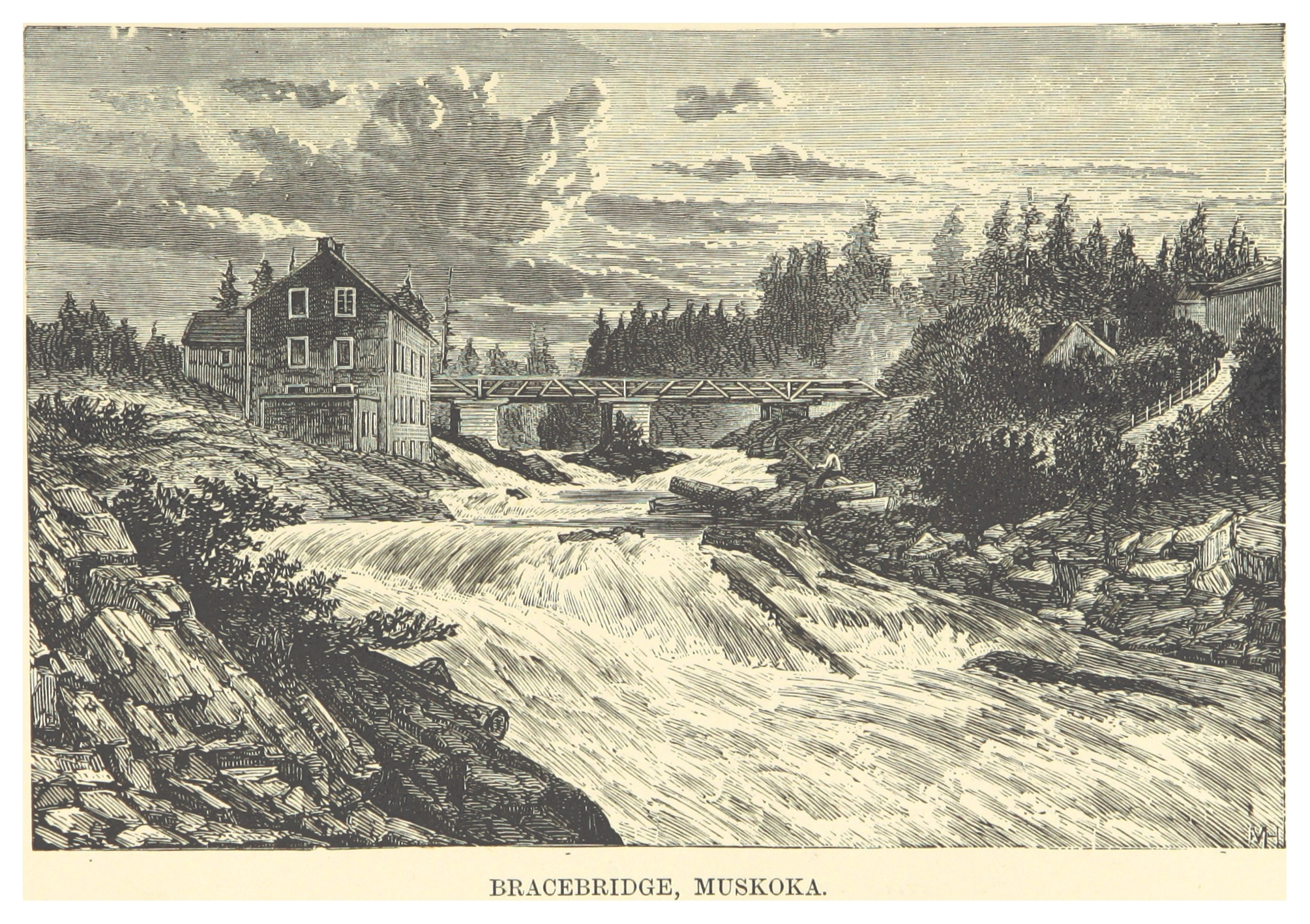
Bracebridge and Muskoka River circa 1880

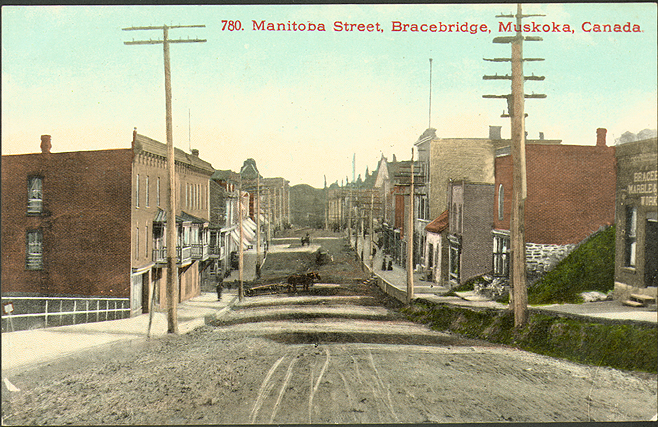
View down Manitoba Street in Bracebridge circa 1910

The character of the town of Bracebridge is shaped by its proximity to Lake Muskoka to which it is connected by 10 km (6.2 mi) of the Muskoka River, and by the promise of abundant water power afforded by the great waterfall at the foot of the downtown. Early growth of the town occurred in proximity to the falls which powered the first factory. The arrival of the Grand Trunk Railway cemented the town's role as a transportation hub for the area.

Modern settlement of the town began in the 1860s, beginning at first with a few log huts. The Muskoka colonization road had been completed to the first falls on the north branch of the Muskoka River by 1862. Entrepreneurs began to take advantage of the area's water power. With the advent of steamship service on Lake Muskoka a few years later, Bracebridge prospered as the main distribution centre for the region.

By 1869, Bracebridge was a village with a population of 160 in the Township of Macaulay, Victoria County. (In 1868 Macauley and six additional townships had been detached from the County and transferred to the new District of Muskoka, but were not withdrawn for municipal purposes until 1877.) The village was established on the Muskoka River. There were stages in winter and boats in summer from Barrie to Washago. The average price of wild land was $2 to $5 an acre while improved land was $10 per acre.

By 1870 the village had a population of about 400, growing to reach a total of about 2,000 by the turn of the 20th century. The village was incorporated in 1875 and became a town under an Act of Parliament in 1889. In 1894 Bracebridge became the first town in Ontario to have its own hydro-generating station. In 1971 Macaulay Township was merged into Bracebridge.

== Geography ==
The municipal boundaries of Bracebridge also encompass the smaller communities of Clear Lake, Falkenburg (ghost town), Falkenburg Station, Fraserburg, Germania, Lakewood, Matthiasville, Monsell (ghost town), Purbrook, Rocksborough, Springdale Park, Stoneleigh, Uffington and Vankoughnet.

=== Climate ===
Climate data for Bracebridge, Ontario (Muskoka Airport) 1991–2020 normals, extremes 1938–present
Month	Jan	Feb	Mar	Apr	May	Jun	Jul	Aug	Sep	Oct	Nov	Dec	Year
Record high humidex	12.0	13.4	25.9	34.0	38.8	41.7	44.4	44.0	44.9	34.6	25.0	23.0	44.9
Record high °C (°F)	13.9 (57.0)	12.0 (53.6)	26.7 (80.1)	30.2 (86.4)	33.8 (92.8)	35.0 (95.0)	35.2 (95.4)	35.0 (95.0)	34.4 (93.9)	28.5 (83.3)	24.4 (75.9)	18.8 (65.8)	35.2 (95.4)
Mean daily maximum °C (°F)	−4.6 (23.7)	−3.1 (26.4)	2.5 (36.5)	10.4 (50.7)	18.4 (65.1)	23.1 (73.6)	25.3 (77.5)	24.4 (75.9)	20.1 (68.2)	12.5 (54.5)	5.1 (41.2)	−1.0 (30.2)	11.1 (52.0)
Daily mean °C (°F)	−10 (14)	−9.1 (15.6)	−3.3 (26.1)	4.4 (39.9)	11.5 (52.7)	16.7 (62.1)	19.1 (66.4)	18.1 (64.6)	13.8 (56.8)	7.4 (45.3)	0.9 (33.6)	−5.4 (22.3)	5.3 (41.5)
Mean daily minimum °C (°F)	−15.3 (4.5)	−15.1 (4.8)	−9.0 (15.8)	−1.6 (29.1)	4.7 (40.5)	10.1 (50.2)	12.8 (55.0)	11.8 (53.2)	7.5 (45.5)	2.2 (36.0)	−3.4 (25.9)	−9.7 (14.5)	−0.4 (31.3)
Record low °C (°F)	−40.0 (−40.0)	−41.5 (−42.7)	−34.3 (−29.7)	−21.1 (−6.0)	−7.8 (18.0)	−2.2 (28.0)	1.7 (35.1)	−1.1 (30.0)	−5.0 (23.0)	−11.1 (12.0)	−23.3 (−9.9)	−41.1 (−42.0)	−41.5 (−42.7)
Record low wind chill	−49.7	−50.7	−43.2	−27.6	−11.4	−5.9	0.0	−4.3	−8.8	−16.9	−30.2	−48	−50.7
Average precipitation mm (inches)	93.0 (3.66)	64.7 (2.55)	73.3 (2.89)	76.6 (3.02)	102.4 (4.03)	85.5 (3.37)	93.7 (3.69)	82.2 (3.24)	111.9 (4.41)	105.2 (4.14)	116.2 (4.57)	100.4 (3.95)	1,105.1 (43.51)
Average rainfall mm (inches)	26.5 (1.04)	19.7 (0.78)	38.0 (1.50)	61.8 (2.43)	101.8 (4.01)	85.5 (3.37)	93.7 (3.69)	82.2 (3.24)	111.9 (4.41)	100.4 (3.95)	81.2 (3.20)	29.7 (1.17)	832.2 (32.76)
Average snowfall cm (inches)	87.2 (34.3)	57.6 (22.7)	40.6 (16.0)	15.5 (6.1)	0.7 (0.3)	0.0 (0.0)	0.0 (0.0)	0.0 (0.0)	0.0 (0.0)	5.2 (2.0)	40.3 (15.9)	91.1 (35.9)	338.1 (133.1)
Average precipitation days (≥ 0.2 mm)	20.4	15.9	14.4	13.9	14.4	12.8	11.7	12.7	14.0	16.2	18.5	20.5	185.4
Average rainy days (≥ 0.2 mm)	4.7	4.1	6.7	10.8	14.3	12.8	11.7	12.7	14.0	15.2	12.0	6.5	125.4
Average snowy days (≥ 0.2 cm)	18.8	14.5	10.4	5.0	0.25	0.0	0.0	0.0	0.04	1.8	9.2	17.2	77.1
Average relative humidity (%) (at 15:00 LST)	72.4	64.6	57.3	53.1	51.7	55.5	55.9	58.1	61.1	65.3	73.0	76.6	62.0
Source: Environment Canada (precipitation/rainfall/snowfall 1981–2010)

== Demographics ==
In the 2021 Census of Population conducted by Statistics Canada, Bracebridge had a population of 17,305 living in 7,233 of its 9,053 total private dwellings, a change of 8.1% from its 2016 population of 16,010. With a land area of 615.2 km^{2} (237.5 sq mi), it had a population density of 28.1/km^{2} (72.9/sq mi) in 2021.

Canada census – Bracebridge community profile

	2021	2016	2011
Population	17,305 (+8.1% from 2016)	16,010 (3.9% from 2011)	15,414 (-1.5% from 2006)
Land area	615.20 km^{2} (237.53 sq mi)	628.22 km^{2} (242.56 sq mi)	625.66 km^{2} (241.57 sq mi)
Population density	28.1/km^{2} (73/sq mi)	25.5/km^{2} (66/sq mi)	24.6/km^{2} (64/sq mi)
Median age	51.2 (M: 49.6, F: 52.4)	50.0 (M: 48.5, F: 51.2)	47.2 (M: 45.6, F: 48.5)
Private dwellings	9,053 (total) 7,233 (occupied)	8,874 (total)	8,519 (total)
Median household income	$85,000	$69,461

References: 2021 2016 2011

Historical census populations – Bracebridge, Ontario

Year	Pop.	±%
1871	700	—
1891	1,419	+102.7%
1901	2,479	+74.7%
1911	2,776	+12.0%
1921	2,451	−11.7%
1931	2,436	−0.6%
1941	2,341	−3.9%
1951	2,684	+14.7%

Year	Pop.	±%
1956	2,849	+6.1%
1961	2,927	+2.7%
1966	3,045	+4.0%
1971	6,903	+126.7%
1976	8,428	+22.1%
1981	9,063	+7.5%
1986	9,811	+8.3%
1991	12,308	+25.5%

Year	Pop.	±%
1996	13,223	+7.4%
2001	13,751	+4.0%
2006	15,652	+13.8%
2011	15,414	−1.5%
2016	16,010	+3.9%
2021	17,305	+8.1%

2011 census population corrected by Statistics Canada Population counts are not adjusted for boundary changes.
Source: Statistics Canada

== Sports ==
The Town of Bracebridge built a Sportsplex in 2006 which contains a rock climbing wall, indoor track, eight-lane swimming pool and fitness studio. The town partnered with the Muskoka Limberettes Gymnastics Club to create a gymnastics facility in the same building. The Sportsplex is part of the same complex including the Bracebridge and Muskoka Lakes Secondary School and Rene M. Caisse Memorial Theatre.

Bracebridge also opened a new 3.75 Million dollar softball venue called Peake Fields at Verena Acres. This facility supports a Men's League, Women's League, and Minor Ball, as well as slow pitch. The Men's fastball League has been running for some 35 years, and has produced 4 Ontario Intermediate Fastball Championships, and 3 Canadian Championships, with all local players.

The new Muskoka Lumber Community Centre celebrated its grand opening on October 10th, 2024, after a three-year construction project that started in 2021. The sports-related facilities include an NHL-sized arena, multi-sport fieldhouse, and an outdoor courtyard and playground. The Muskoka Lumber Community Centre received the 2025 Parks and Recreation Ontario (PRO) Award of Excellence for Facility Design.

== Attractions and venues ==
Bracebridge is the home of Santa's Village, a Christmas theme park, established in 1955. It was inspired by the town's location at 45 degrees latitude, halfway between the equator and the North Pole. In 2016, Bracebridge held its first annual Fire and Ice Festival.

== Transportation ==
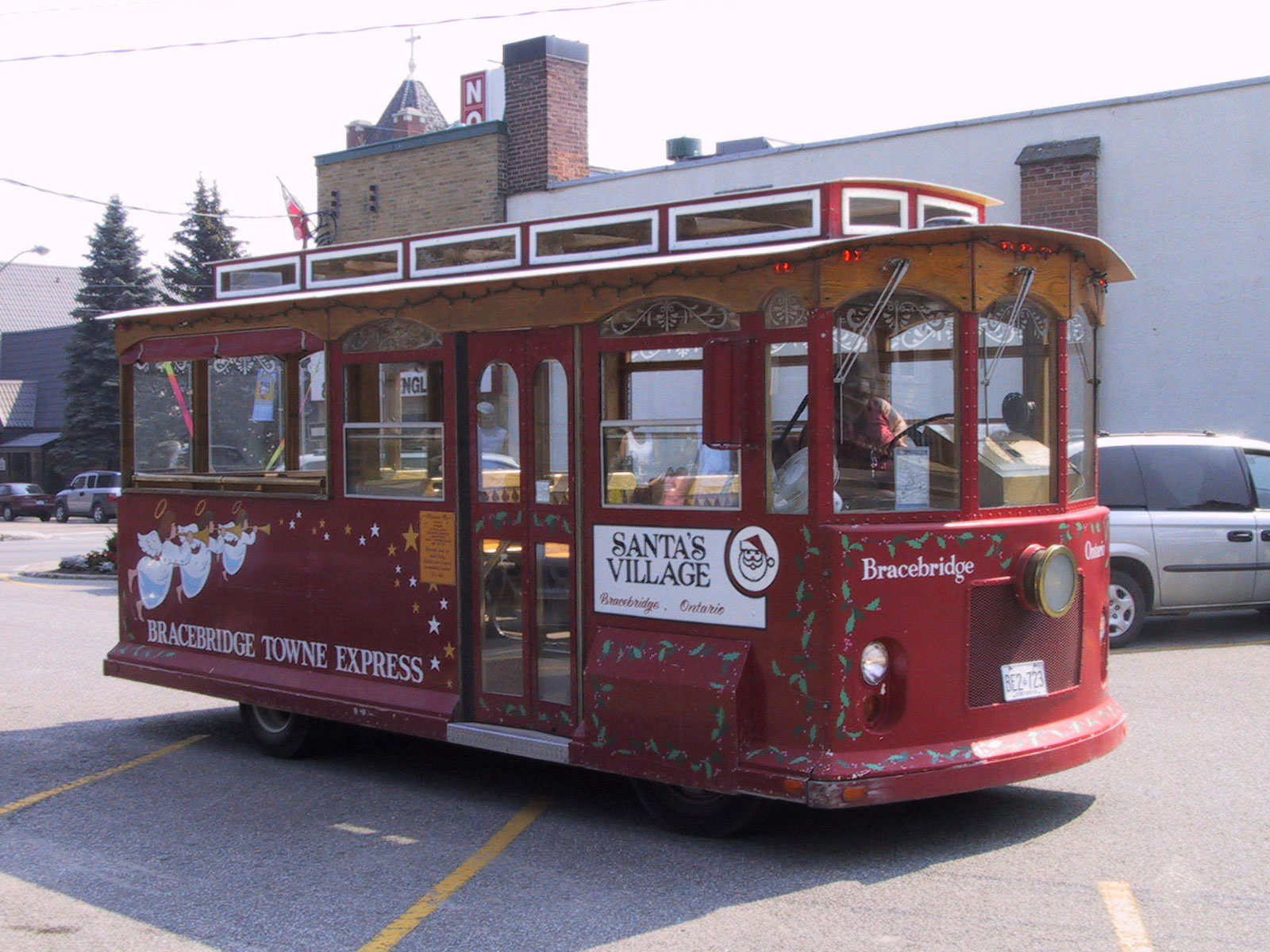
The Bracebridge Town Express 'trolley'

Bracebridge is immediately adjacent to Highway 11, a major provincial highway that connects the community to Greater Toronto in under 2 hours, as well as to markets in Northern Ontario. Muskoka Airport, which serves general aviation and scheduled flights from Billy Bishop Toronto City Airport, is located 5 km south of Bracebridge.

While rail service to Bracebridge has been discontinued, the community is serviced by coach bus line Ontario Northland Motor Coach Services that departs from the Bracebridge Quality Inn and takes passengers south to Toronto and north to North Bay. In 2016, the municipality launched Bracebridge Transit, a one-hour single-route schedule that gets residents around the urban core. Bracebridge Mobility also offers door-to-door service to individuals who are unable to access the regular transit service due to mobility issues. The site of the Bracebridge station, with the waiting station, remains.

== Education ==
Bracebridge is served by several elementary schools and two high schools: Bracebridge and Muskoka Lakes Secondary School, and Saint Dominic Catholic Secondary School. Public education is administered by the Trillium Lakelands District School Board, and Catholic education is administered by the Simcoe Muskoka Catholic District School Board.

Georgian College operates a satellite campus in the town with programming that supports the local labour market. Nipissing University operated in Bracebridge for over 21 years but chose to consolidate its operations in 2016 resulting in the closure of the local campus. The facility was purchased in 2018 by a private institute.

== Media ==
=== Newspapers ===
Local newspapers include Bracebridge Examiner, District Weekender, Muskoka Sun and Muskoka Advance.

The first newspaper in Bracebridge was the Northern Advocate begun in 1870 by Thomas McMurray. It was joined in 1872 by the Free Grant Gazette owned by E.F. Stephenson. The Advocate ceased publication in 1874 and was bought out by Stephenson. Competition resumed, however, in 1878 when Mr Gaffe and Mr Oaten founded the Muskoka Herald.

=== Radio ===
Frequency	Call sign	Branding	Format	Owner	Notes
FM 98.3	CIIG-FM	Muskoka Information Radio	Community radio/tourist information	Instant Information Services	
FM 99.5	CFBG-FM	Moose FM	hot adult contemporary	Vista Broadcast Group	
FM 102.3	CJMU-FM	Country 102	Country music	Bayshore Broadcasting.	

Other radio stations from Barrie, Orillia, Huntsville including the surrounding areas can also be heard in the Bracebridge and Gravenhurst areas. (See also: Central Ontario Radio)

== Notable residents ==
- Irvin "Ace" Bailey, Hockey Hall of Famer
- Patrick Boyer (born 1945), politician - born in Bracebridge
- Frank Carson, former NHL player
- William Joseph James "Doc" Carson, former NHL player, 1929 Stanley Cup
- Roger Crozier, former NHL player
- Gary Denniss, writer, teacher, historian, columnist, preacher
- Marty Gervais, writer, journalist, historian
- Mary Harron, director of American Psycho
- Kris King, former NHL player
- Deric Ruttan, Canadian country music singer/songwriter
- Liisa Savijarvi, downhill skier who competed at the 1984 Olympics
- Zander Sherman, writer
- Graydon Smith, Politician, former mayor of Bracebridge
- Melle van 't Wout, short-track speed skater, grew up in Bracebridge
- Jens van 't Wout, short-track speed skater, grew up in Bracebridge

== See also ==
- List of townships in Ontario
