= Gravenhurst High School =

Location
- 325 Mary Street South; Gravenhurst, Muskoka, Ontario, P1P 1X7; Canada; 44.9170°N 79.3764°W

Information
- Established: 1896
- School board: TLDSB
- Area trustee: Louise Clodd
- School number: 705-687-2283
- Principal: Trent Willett
- Enrollment: 330
- Colours: Garnet and Gold
- Sports: Volleyball, Basketball, Soccer, Badminton, Hockey, and Lacrosse
- Team name: The Gryphons
- Website: ghs.tldsb.on.ca

Gravenhurst High School is a secondary school in Gravenhurst, Ontario, Canada, established in 1896. It has a population of roughly 415 students. GHS is one of seven secondary schools in the Trillium Lakelands District School Board, and is the only high school in Gravenhurst.

== History ==
1887 A High School Board is formed in Gravenhurst.

1889 The first High School classes are held in the North Ward School.

1890 The School Inspector reports poor conditions in the school but gives the teachers a high rating

1891 The High School Board agrees to create a suitable High School building.

1894 A By-law is passed in Gravenhurst to raise debentures for the construction of a high school.

1896 First Gravenhurst High School building was constructed. It cost $4,150 and consisted of 3 classrooms, 1 laboratory, 1 storeroom and a combined office-library. Dr. W.H. Muldrew was the first principal and being an expert of native trees and shrubs, designed the landscaping. He published his book, Sylvan Ontario, A guide to our Native trees and shrubs in 1901.

1940 Miss Dorothy Shaw becomes principal until 1962. Miss Shaw had previously been a teacher at the school. When she arrived the enrollment was about 80 students with a staff of 4 teachers.

1950 The Gravenhurst High School building becomes Gravenhurst Public School. Over its 54 years 2,500 students attended. School population ranged from about 40 in the early years to about 170 in the recent years.

In 1951 the Ministry of Education opened the new two-storey brick building on the present site at a cost of $295,000. The school now had 7 classrooms and a staff of 8. The capacity of the school was 250-300 with the enrollment of the time at 189. Several days after the opening the old school building burned down. The school was expanded again in 1959 and 1973.

In 2002 the school had an enrollment of 495 and a teaching staff of 29, 8 educational assistants, 3 office personnel, and a staff of 5 custodial personnel.

In the early 2000s, talk of a "super school" to be built between Gravenhurst and Bracebridge, which would force closure of GHS due to low enrollment numbers. However, after much debate between students, parents and the board of education in the Save Our School Campaign, the idea was dropped.

== Specialist High Skills Majors ==
Gravenhurst High School introduced a specialist high skills major (SHSM) program to the school in September 2012. Funded by the Ontario government, SHSM allows for students to narrow in on their career paths while still in high school. Participants can experience secondary school with a career focus to suit their interests for any post-secondary destination (workplace, apprentice, college and university). SHSM is ministry approved and allows students to still meet the requirements to graduate from secondary school.

The program allows for them to obtain their Ontario Secondary School Diploma with a red seal to signify the completion of a specialist high skills major program. In order to obtain the seal, students must complete a specific bundle of 8-10 courses in the students’ field of interest as well as earn industry certifications such as CPR.

Though SHSM offers programs in fields ranging from construction to business, Gravenhurst High School will allow students to major in Health and Wellness. There are many benefits to students participating in SHSM aside from a specialized high school career. The credits obtained through the program are recognized by post-secondary institutions and can lead to exemption from some courses at their post-secondary institutions.

== See also ==
- Education in Ontario
- List of secondary schools in Ontario
- Trillium Lakelands District School Board
