= Huntsville High School (Ontario) =

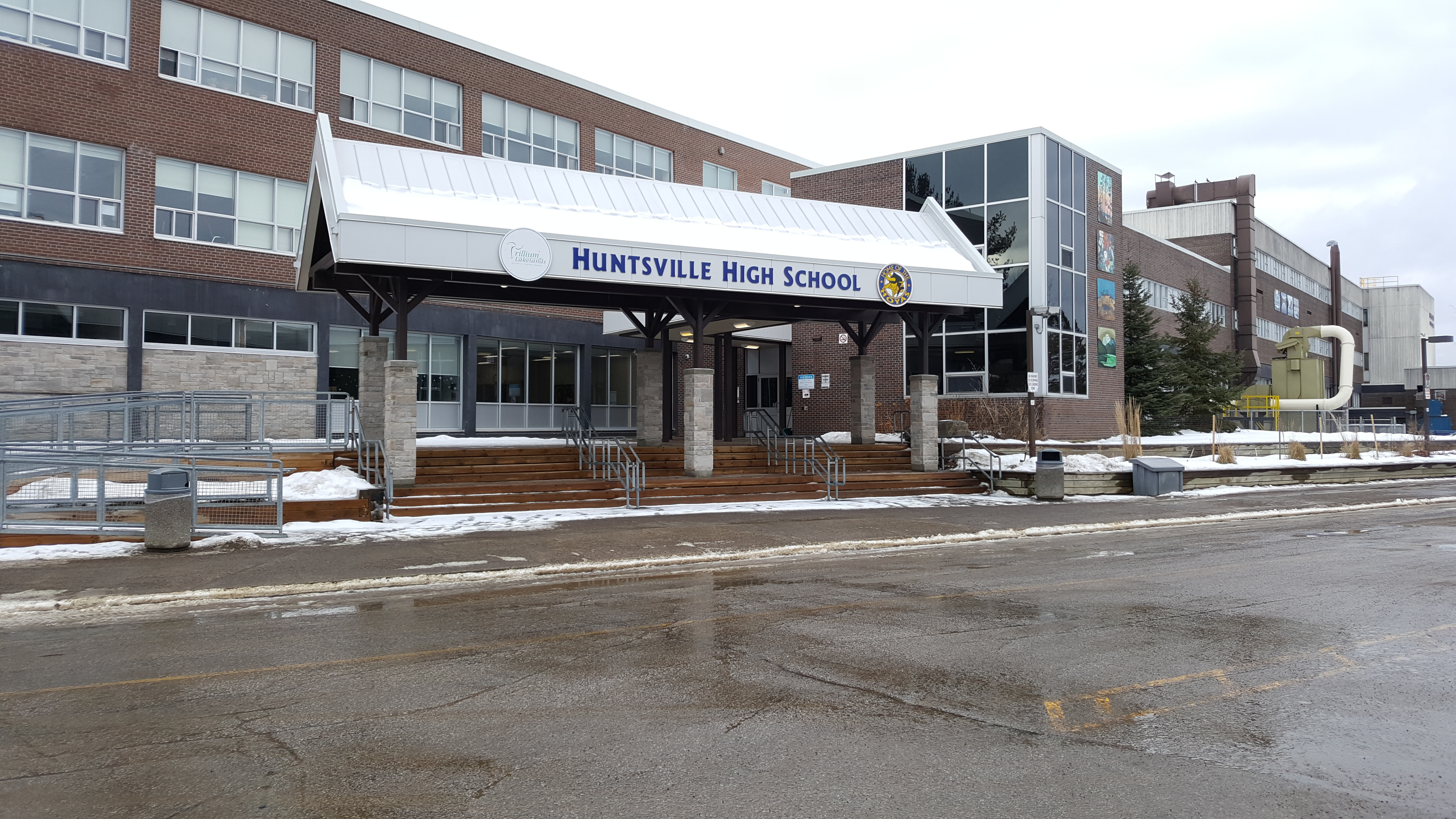

Location
- 58 Brunel Road; Huntsville, Ontario; Canada; 45.32254°N 79.21377°W

Information
- School type: Public high school
- School board: Trillium Lakelands District School Board
- Principal: Kelly Picken
- Grades: 9 to 12
- Language: English
- Colours: Blue and Gold
- Team name: Hoyas
- Website: hhs.tldsb.on.ca

Huntsville High School (HHS) currently serves around 1000 students and is situated in Huntsville, Ontario, Canada, it is located at 58 Brunel Road. The school was built in 1955 and has since undergone two extensive additions. The school provides grades 9–12 education for all of Huntsville.

== Athletics ==
Huntsville High School has a number of different sports teams running in the fall, winter, and spring, and in particular its Nordic skiing program. Athletes and teams from the Nordic skiing program have won OFSAA championships on numerous occasions and many alumni have gone on to compete at the university, national, and international scene.

== Notable alumni ==
- Dan Roycroft, 2006 Olympic skier
- Hawksley Workman, Juno award-winning popular musician
- Dara Howell, 2014 Olympic Gold Medalist in Slopestyle Skiing

== See also ==
- Education in Ontario
- List of secondary schools in Ontario
