= Fleming College =

College in Peterborough, Ontario, Canada

- Motto: Apply Yourself Here (formerly: Let the Deed Shaw)
- Named for: Sir Sandford Fleming
- Type: Public
- Established: 1967; 59 years ago
- Affiliations: ACCC, CCAA, Peterborough Museum & Archives
- President: Maureen Adamson
- Students: 2025: 4,208 FTEs
- Location: Peterborough, Ontario, Canada
- Campus: Urban
- Colours: Black; Turquoise; Orange; Red; Blue; Green
- Nickname: Phoenix
- Website: flemingcollege.ca

Fleming College, also known as Sir Sandford Fleming College, is an Ontario College of Applied Arts and Technology located in Peterborough, Ontario, Canada.

== History ==
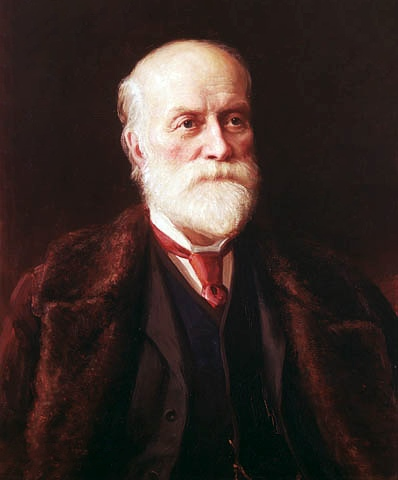
Portrait of Sir Sandford Fleming

The college was named after the Scottish-born engineer and inventor Sir Sandford Fleming, who is perhaps best known for his contributions to the concept of Universal Standard Time, and who was knighted in 1897 by Queen Victoria.

On 21 May 1965, legislation was introduced in Ontario establishing Colleges of Applied Arts and Technology by then Minister of Education William G. Davis. This historic occasion for education within Ontario marked the beginning of what would become, some 50 years later, a group of 21 Colleges of Applied Arts and Technology and 3 College Institutes of Technology and Advanced Learning.

Sir Sandford Fleming College was subsequently founded in 1967, with David B. Sutherland serving as its first president. Sutherland was the husband of Peterborough's longest-serving mayor, Sylvia Sutherland.

In 2024, facing challenges due to federal policy changes lowering international student enrolment, Fleming cancelled or suspended dozens of programs and these difficulties continued into 2024, leading to laid offs, with the school saying it's been necessary to combat a funding deficit.

=== Merger With St. Lawrence College ===
In April 2026 after declining enrolment of international students and staff lay offs with permanent terminations of many programs, Fleming College and St. Lawrence College announced they would merge operations on April 1, 2027 with all the campuses remaining open.

== Organization ==
The college is governed by a Board of Governors, headed by the President, and executive staff.

== Campuses ==
=== Peterborough Campus ===
The main campus of Fleming College is the Sutherland Campus in Peterborough. Other campuses are located in Cobourg, Haliburton (Haliburton School of Art + Design), and Lindsay (Frost Campus). The college's modern architecture was designed by Ronald Thom.

==== Sutherland Campus ====
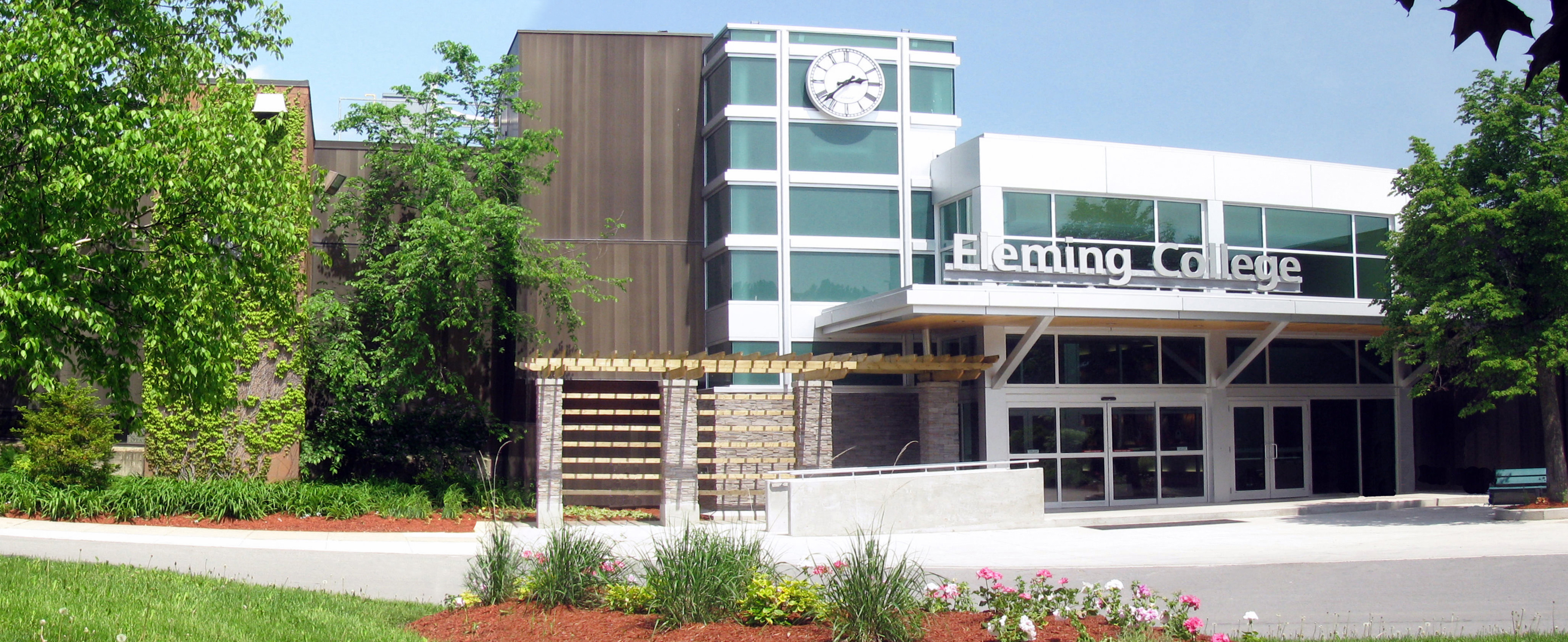
Sutherland Campus main entrance

The Dobbin farm was selected in 1967 for what would later be named the Sutherland Campus. In 1973, the first two phases of the site were opened, and in 1983, the site was named the Sutherland Campus in honour of the college's first and founding president. The Sutherland Campus underwent expansion, including a new on-campus residence in 2002 and a new technology wing in 2003.

St. Joseph's at Fleming, a cluster of eight resident homes for 200 people, opened in 2004 and is the first long-term care facility to be built on a college or university campus.

In 2005, the Peterborough Sport & Wellness Centre was constructed on campus to accommodate the college's athletic needs. Built in partnership with the City of Peterborough, the Wellness Centre provides athletic and aquatic facilities to students and the community. As well, the Fleming Sport Complex - two new artificial turf fields, change rooms and a field house - opened at the campus in October 2013.

The campus is home to the Kawartha Trades and Technology Centre (KTTC), which opened in 2014, and features Fleming's trades and technology programs.

==== McRae Building ====
In 1967 a campus opened in a renovated textile mill on McDonnel Street, and in 1968 the site was named the Stewart W. Daniel Building. The McRae building was also constructed on this same property in 1976. The site was home to Fleming College's trades programs but closed when the KTTC opened in 2014.

=== Cobourg Campus ===
The Cobourg Campus opened in 1971. Today the campus offers Academic Upgrading and Continuing Education/Corporate Training courses.

=== Haliburton Campus ===
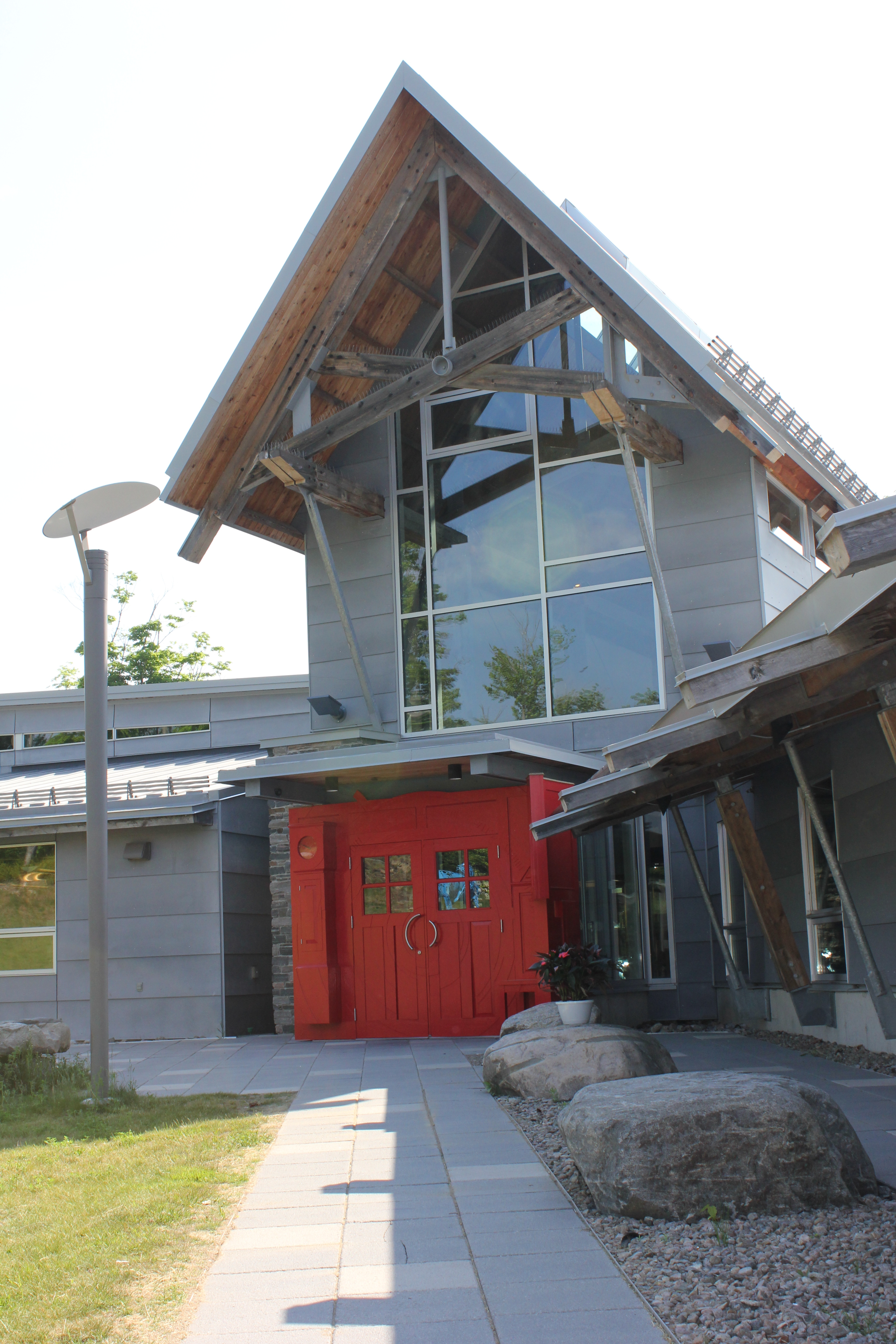
Haliburton School of Art + Design 45.0516833°N 78.5221383°W

In 1969, the Haliburton School of Fine Arts became part of Sir Sandford Fleming College. In 2004 the campus moved to a new location in Glebe Park on Head Lake in the Village of Haliburton, and today it is known as the Haliburton School of Art + Design. The campus offers full-time 14-week Art Certificates in Artist Blacksmithing, Drawing and Painting, Photo Arts, Digital Image Design, Sculpture, Ceramics, Glassblowing, Jewellery, and Fibre Arts. Students can combine these Certificate programs with a year of foundation credits to obtain a Visual and Creative Arts Diploma. Other programs offered at the campus include Expressive Arts, Sustainable Building Design and Construction, Continuing Education, and Academic Upgrading.

Haliburton School of Art + Design continues to run its short-duration summer arts courses, offering a selection of over 300 courses from May to August, open to people of all skill levels.

The Haliburton Sculpture Forest is located in the forested area of the campus. The Sculpture Forest features over 25 permanent sculptures by Canadian and International artists.

=== Frost Campus ===
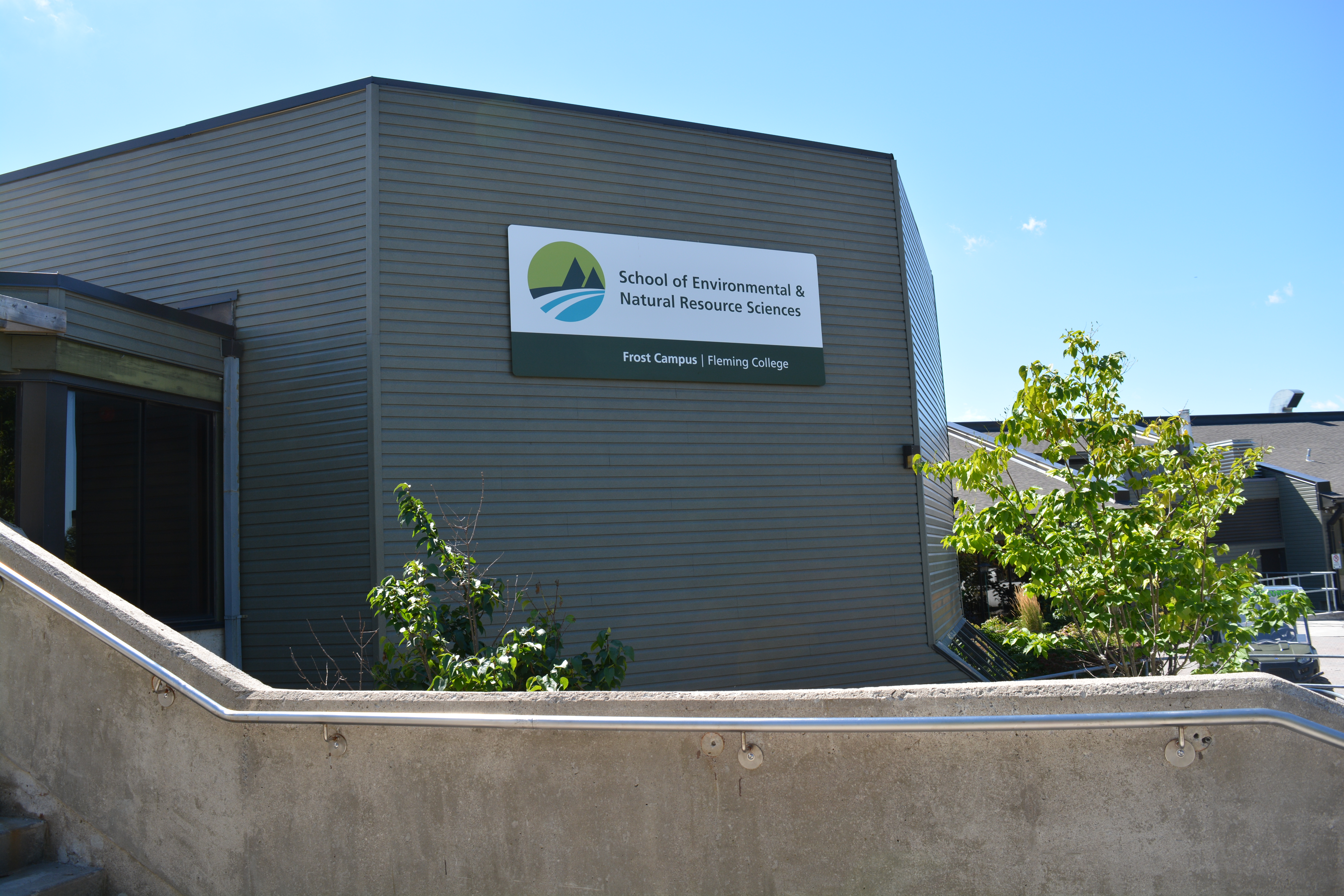
Frost Campus, Front Entrance 44.341808°N 78.740128°W

St. Joseph's Convent was the original location of the college's Lindsay campus in 1967. The college acquired its own facilities by 1973 and, in turn, this site was named the Frost Campus (in honour of Leslie Frost). Frost Campus is Fleming's School of Environmental and Natural Resource Sciences, which focuses on environmental and natural resource education (including earth resources, fish and wildlife, and GIS). In 2004, the campus expanded with a new environmental technology wing.

The Frost Campus features a "living wall" (the first of its kind in a college environment): a green roof, a campus arboretum and a butterfly garden. The campus is home to two fish hatcheries, which raise muskellunge and Atlantic salmon as part of fish restoration and conservation efforts.

The Centre for Advancement of Water and Wastewater Technologies (CAWT) is also based at Frost Campus. The CAWT is an internationally recognized research institute that conducts research in the areas of water and wastewater treatment science. It is composed of scientists, faculty researchers, technologists, and a community of associates from academic, industrial, and private sectors.

In September 2008 the Frost Campus became home to the new joint degree-diploma in Ecological Restoration in partnership with Trent University. Students in the program spend two years at Fleming and two years at Trent. They can graduate with an Honours B.Sc. and an Ontario College Diploma in Ecological Restoration.

=== Toronto Campus ===
The college has partnered with Trebas Institute to establish Fleming College Toronto. In March 2022, Fleming College and Trebas Institute formed a partnership to offer some of Fleming's programs at Fleming College's Toronto campus (operated by Global University Systems Canada, who owns Trebas Institute). The partnership, approved by Ontario's Ministry of Colleges and Universities, allows students to access a combination of programs and services from both public and private institutions. The collaboration aims to provide practical, industry-relevant education to help students succeed in the workforce. The Toronto campus offers students the opportunity to study in a business-focused environment with access to career opportunities in the Greater Toronto Area.

== Partnerships ==
The college has established pathways from college to university through affiliations with a number of provincial, national and international post college institutions and universities. The college has established pathways for students to transfer their credits to Trent University.

In March 2022, the college launched a partnership with the semi-professional League1 Ontario soccer expansion team Electric City FC for the use of its Sports Complex for the club's home games. The club later folded after just two seasons of operation in January 2024 due to declining fan attendance and ownership mismanagement.

== Scholarships ==
Fleming has provided more than $3.3 million to students in financial need through donor-sponsored scholarships and bursaries.

== Programs ==
Fleming College once featured more than 100 full-time programs. In 2024 the college announced it was cutting nearly 30 programs due to International student visa caps.

Fleming College has a Computer Security and Investigations program, which is one of only three related programs in Canada.

== Student government ==
The social and political needs of students are served through the Student Administrative Council (SAC) at Sutherland Campus and the Frost Student Association (FSA) at Frost and Haliburton Campuses. These are student-run corporations.

== Notable alumni ==
- Nila Reynolds

== See also ==
- Higher education in Ontario
- List of colleges in Ontario
