= Saint Dominic Catholic Secondary School =

St. Dominic Catholic Secondary School

Location
- 955 Cedar Lane; Bracebridge, Ontario, P1L 0A1; Canada; 45.04796°N 79.29554°W

Information
- School type: High School
- Motto: together in truth and love
- Founded: 1995
- School board: Simcoe Muskoka Catholic District School Board
- School number: 786691
- Principal: Carlo Iocono
- Grades: 9 to 12
- Enrollment: 230 (2021)
- Language: English
- Colour: Hunter green / Navy blue
- Mascot: Domie the Dragon
- Team name: Dragons
- Website: dom.smcdsb.on.ca

St. Dominic Catholic Secondary School is a high school in Bracebridge, Ontario, Canada that serves all students from the Muskoka and Parry Sound area. Opened in 1995, the school campus has seen several stages of expansion to accommodate the school's growth in programming and population. St. Dominic C.S.S. is part of the Simcoe Muskoka Catholic District School Board.

== History ==
In 2014, the Simcoe Muskoka Catholic District School Board invested in the school's one-to-one technology initiative which provided every student with an opportunity to use a Chromebook for the school year.

== Teams and clubs ==
St. Dominic offers athletic team sports as well as several school clubs.

Teams include volleyball, basketball, soccer, badminton, and cross-country along with several other major team sports.

Clubs include Yearbook, Coding Club, Robotics Club, among various others.

== Community involvement ==
- Spanish exchange history
- Murals (including for Bracebridge's "Fire and Ice" festival)
- Greenhouse
- The Pines
- "Santa's Workshop" - A program run by the SDCSS Construction Technology classes whereas younger students and the less fortunate receive handmade toys from the shop students.

== See also ==
- Education in Ontario
- List of secondary schools in Ontario
