= Simcoe Muskoka Catholic District School Board =

Catholic school board in Ontario, Canada

Coordinates: 44.41085°N 79.68088°W

The Simcoe Muskoka Catholic District School Board SMCDSB

Location
- 46 Alliance Boulevard, Barrie, Ontario L4M 5K3 All of Simcoe County and Muskoka District, Ontario Canada

District information
- Schools: 53; 44 elementary, 9 secondary
- Budget: CA$175 million (2004-05)

Other information
- Chair of the Board: Maria Hardie
- Board director: Kimberly Dixon
- Elected trustees: Janice Hutchison, Peter Fracassi, Joe Zerdin, Catherine MacDonald, Shawn Cooper, Maria Hardie, Carol Corriveau-Truchon, Francis Smith, Jeanny Salmon.
- Website: smcdsb.on.ca

The Simcoe Muskoka Catholic District School Board (SMCDSB, known as English-language Separate District School Board No. 44 prior to 1999) administers and governs separate school Catholic education from kindergarten through grade 12 in Simcoe County and the District of Muskoka, in Ontario, Canada. As of 2018-2019, the school board has 41 elementary and 9 secondary schools located in communities throughout Simcoe County and the District of Muskoka. Its boundaries are Highway 9 in the south to Huntsville in the north, and from Collingwood in the west to Brechin on the east side of Lake Simcoe.

The board was originally known as Simcoe Muskoka Roman Catholic Separate School Board (SMRCSSB) and operated anglophone and francophone schools.

== Secondary schools ==
The following is a list of the secondary schools managed by the SMCDSB:

| School | Location |
|---|---|
| Holy Trinity Catholic High School | Bradford |
| Our Lady of the Bay Catholic High School | Collingwood |
| Patrick Fogarty Catholic Secondary School | Orillia |
| St. Joan of Arc Catholic High School | Barrie |
| St. Joseph's Catholic High School | Barrie |
| St. Peter's Catholic Secondary School | Barrie |
| Saint Dominic Catholic Secondary School | Bracebridge |
| St. Theresa's Catholic High School | Midland |
| St. Thomas Aquinas Catholic Secondary School | Tottenham |

== Elementary schools ==
The following is a list of the elementary schools managed by the SMCDSB:

| School | Location |
|---|---|
| Holy Family Catholic School | Alliston |
| St. Paul’s Catholic School | Alliston |
| Our Lady of Grace Catholic School | Angus |
| Monsignor Clair Catholic Elementary School | Barrie |
| St. John Paul II Catholic School | Barrie |
| St. Bernadette Catholic School | Barrie |
| St. Catherine of Siena Catholic School | Barrie |
| St. John Vianney Catholic School | Barrie |
| St. Marguerite d’Youville Catholic School | Barrie |
| St. Mary's Catholic School | Barrie |
| St. Michael the Archangel Catholic School | Barrie |
| Sister Catherine Donnelly Catholic School | Barrie |
| St. Monica’s Catholic School | Barrie |
| St. Nicholas Catholic School | Barrie |
| The Good Shepherd Catholic School | Barrie |
| Saint Gabriel the Archangel Catholic School | Barrie |
| Monsignor J.E. Ronan Catholic School | Beeton |
| Monsignor Michael O'Leary Catholic School | Bracebridge |
| St. Angela Merici Catholic School | Bradford |
| St. Charles Catholic School | Bradford |
| St. Jean de Brebeuf Catholic School | Bradford |
| St. Marie of the Incarnation Catholic School | Bradford |
| St. Teresa of Calcutta Catholic School | Bradford |
| Foley Catholic School | Brechin |
| St. Mary's Catholic School | Collingwood |
| Our Lady of Lourdes Catholic School | Elmvale |
| Saint Mary Catholic School | Huntsville |
| St. Francis of Assisi Catholic School | Innisfil |
| Holy Cross Catholic School | Innisfil |
| Monsignor Castex Catholic School | Midland |
| Sacred Heart Catholic School | Midland |
| Monsignor Lee Catholic School | Orillia |
| Notre Dame Catholic School | Orillia |
| St. Bernard's Catholic School | Orillia |
| Canadian Martyrs Catholic School | Penetanguishene |
| St. Ann’s Catholic School | Penetanguishene |
| Father F. X. O’Reilly Catholic School | Tottenham |
| St. James Catholic School | Tottenham |
| St. Antoine Daniel Catholic School | Victoria Harbour |
| St. Peter the Apostle Catholic School | Parry Sound |
| St. Noel Chabanel Catholic School | Wasaga Beach |

== See also ==
- Archdiocese of Toronto
- Simcoe County District School Board
- Trillium Lakelands District School Board
- List of school districts in Ontario
- List of high schools in Ontario
