= Trillium Lakelands District School Board =

School board in Ontario, Canada

Trillium Lakelands District School Board TLDSB

Location
- 300 County Rd. 36, Lindsay, Ontario Canada

District information
- Chair of the board: Bruce Reain
- Director of education: Wes Hahn
- Schools: 48 (41 elementary, 7 secondary) and 7 Adult Education Centres
- Budget: CA$200.8 million (2009-10)

Other information
- Website: tldsb.ca

The Trillium Lakelands District School Board (TLDSB, known as English-language Public District School Board No. 15 prior to 1999) administers public school education for students in a large area of central Ontario, Canada, including the municipalities of the City of Kawartha Lakes, Haliburton County, and the District Municipality of Muskoka. It manages 41 elementary schools, 7 secondary schools and 7 Adult Education and Training Centres.

== History ==
In 1999 the Victoria County Board of Education, Muskoka Board of Education, and the Haliburton County Board of Education were amalgamated into the Trillium Lakelands District School Board.

The Trillium Lakelands District School Board was involved in a landmark legal decision in Ontario, Canada, regarding the responsibility of school boards for sexual abuse of students. On June 30, 2021, Justice Salmers of the Ontario Superior Court of Justice found the Trillium Lakelands District School Board vicariously liable in a historical sexual abuse lawsuit. The case related to the sexual abuse of a student by a former teacher, Royce Galon Williamson, dating back to the 1980s. Williamson was the victim's music teacher. The school board alone was ordered to pay over $500,000 to compensate the victim.

== Secondary schools ==
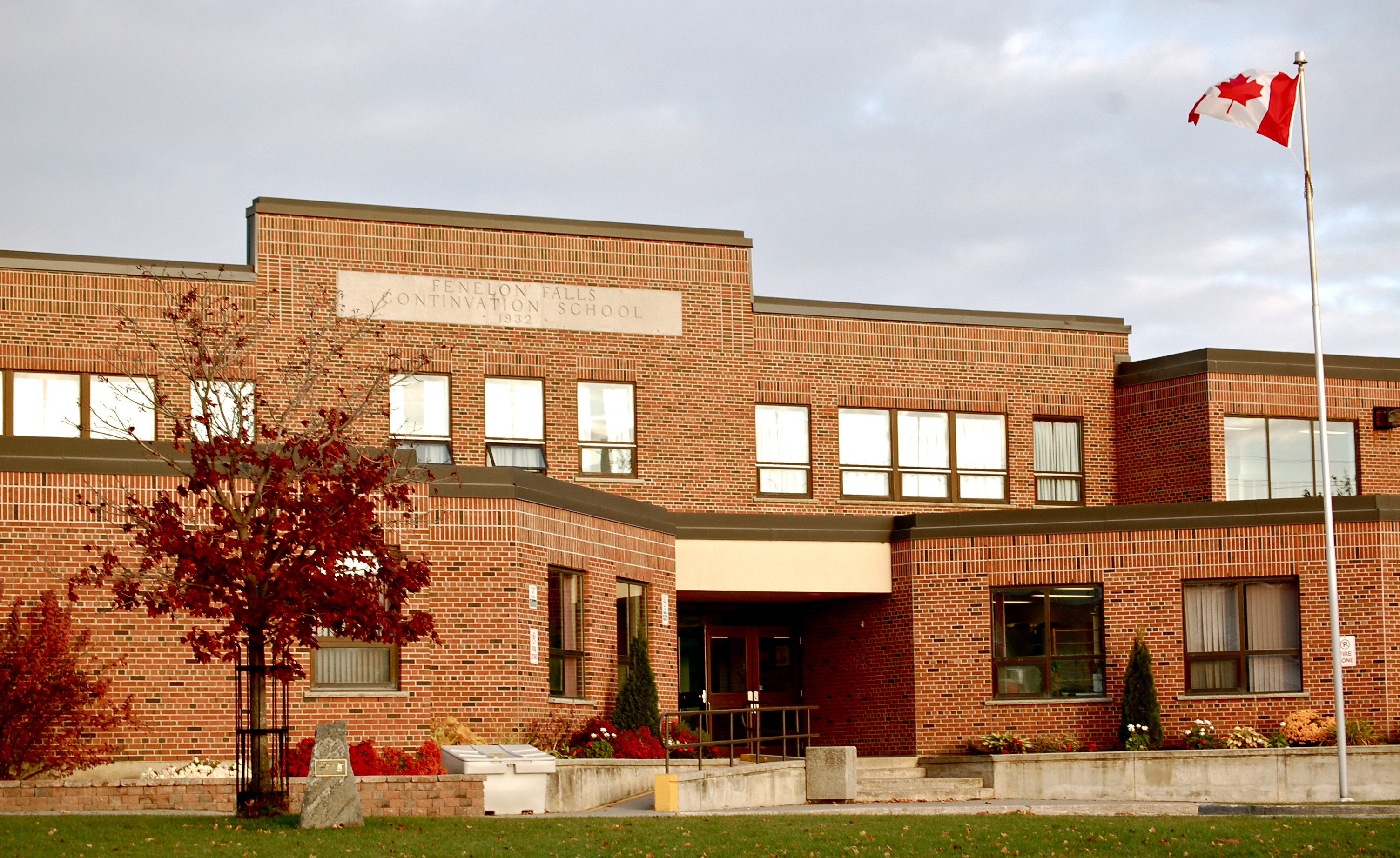
Fenelon Falls Secondary School

The following is a list of the secondary schools managed by the TLDSB.

School	Community
Bracebridge and Muskoka Lakes Secondary School	Bracebridge
Fenelon Falls Secondary School	Fenelon Falls
Gravenhurst High School	Gravenhurst
Haliburton Highlands Secondary School	Haliburton
Huntsville High School	Huntsville
I. E. Weldon Secondary School	Lindsay
Lindsay Collegiate and Vocational Institute	Lindsay

== Elementary schools ==
- Mariposa Elementary School
- Archie Stouffer Elementary School
- Bobcaygeon Public School
- Bracebridge Public School
- Cardiff Elementary School
- Central Senior School
- Dr. George Hall Public School
- Dunsford District Elementary School
- Fenelon Township Public School
- Glen Orchard Public School
- Grandview Public School
- Gravenhurst Public School
- Honey Harbour Public School
- Huntsville Public School
- Irwin Memorial Public School
- JD Hodgson Elementary School
- Jack Callaghan Public School
- King Albert Public School
- KP Manson Public School
- Lady Eaton Elementary School
- Lady MacKenzie Public School
- Langton Public School
- Leslie Frost Public School
- Macaulay Public School
- Alexandra Public School
- Monck Public School
- Muskoka Beechgrove Public School
- Muskoka Falls Public School
- Parkview Public School
- Pine Glen Public School
- Queen Victoria Public School
- Ridgewood Public School
- Riverside Public School
- Rolling Hills Public School
- Scott Young Public School
- Spruce Glen Public School
- Stuart Baker Elementary School
- VK Greer Memorial Public School
- Watt Public School
- Wilberforce Elementary School
- Woodville Elementary School

== Alternate Education and Training Centres ==
- Bracebridge AETC
- Fenelon Falls AETC
- Gravenhurst AETC
- Haliburton AETC
- Huntsville AETC
- Lindsay AETC
- Virtual Learning Centre

TLDSB also operates six Alternate Education and Training Centres (Bracebridge AETC, Fenelon Falls AETC, Gravenhurst AETC, Haliburton AETC, Huntsville AETC, and Lindsay AETC) and the Virtual Learning Centre (VLC). The VLC has offered online courses since 1997, and is the oldest fully online school in Ontario.

== See also ==
- Simcoe Muskoka Catholic District School Board
- List of school districts in Ontario
- List of high schools in Ontario
