= Haliburton Highlands Secondary School =

Location
- 5358 Cty Road 21; Haliburton, Ontario; Canada; 45.04320°N 78.52376°W

Information
- School type: Public high school
- Motto: "Once a Hawk, always a Hawk" "Respect, Commitment, Responsibility"
- School board: Trillium Lakelands District School Board
- Area trustee: Gary Brohman
- Principal: Jennifer Mills
- Grades: 9 to 12
- Enrollment: approx. 475 (2019)
- Language: English
- Colours: Red and White
- Mascot: Big Red
- Team name: Red Hawks
- Website: hss.tldsb.on.ca

Haliburton Highlands Secondary School (HHSS) is a small secondary school situated in Haliburton, Ontario, Canada, and is located on Head Lake.

The school provides grades 9-12 education for all of Haliburton County and its surrounding area.

== Activities ==
Haliburton Highlands Secondary School has strong drama and music programs. The school's drama students have participated in the filming of the Camp Rock films. The art program at the school includes the opportunity for students to earn a college credit alongside their high school diploma at the Haliburton School of the Arts.

== Sports ==
HHSS has many sports teams, including hockey, wrestling, volleyball, basketball, soccer, badminton, football, field hockey, snowboarding, curling, and rugby.

== Notable alumni ==
- Mike Bradley, Edmonton Eskimos (CFL) running back
- Matt Duchene, Dallas Stars (NHL) forward, Winter Olympic gold medal athlete
- Cody Hodgson, former NHL forward

== See also ==
- Education in Ontario
- List of secondary schools in Ontario
