= Farquhar Lake =

Medium-sized glacial lake in Ontario

- Location of Farquhar Lake in southern Ontario
- Location: Dysart et al, Ontario, Canada
- Group: Great Lakes Basin
- Coordinates: 45°04′55″N 78°12′26″W

Farquhar Lake is a glacial lake located in the Municipality of Dysart et al, Haliburton County in Central Ontario, Canada. It is the first and northernmost glacial lake in the Burnt River watershed.

== Hydrology ==
The Gull River watershed is the other main component of Haliburton County's river system. Burnt River is fed by Drag Lake, Grace Lake, and others, while Gull River is fed primarily by Kennisis Lake, Redstone Lake, and Haliburton Lake. These two river systems flow as part of the Trent-Severn Waterway, collecting and draining water into Lake Ontario. Farquhar Lake drains briefly into the southern portion of neighbouring Grace Lake, where the Irondale River begins to form.

== Geography ==
Just 15 minutes east of Haliburton, Farquhar Lake is one of the deepest, clearest lakes in the county with a maximum depth of approximately 171 feet. It is crescent shaped with multiple small bays and inlets, and the largest of the surrounding lakes, such as Grace lake, Dark Lake, and Cardiff Lake.

The nearest town is Wilberforce, located in the Haliburton Highlands, where you'll find a grocery store, LCBO, and Agnew's General Store which is regarded as the oldest general stores in Ontario and dating back to 1921.

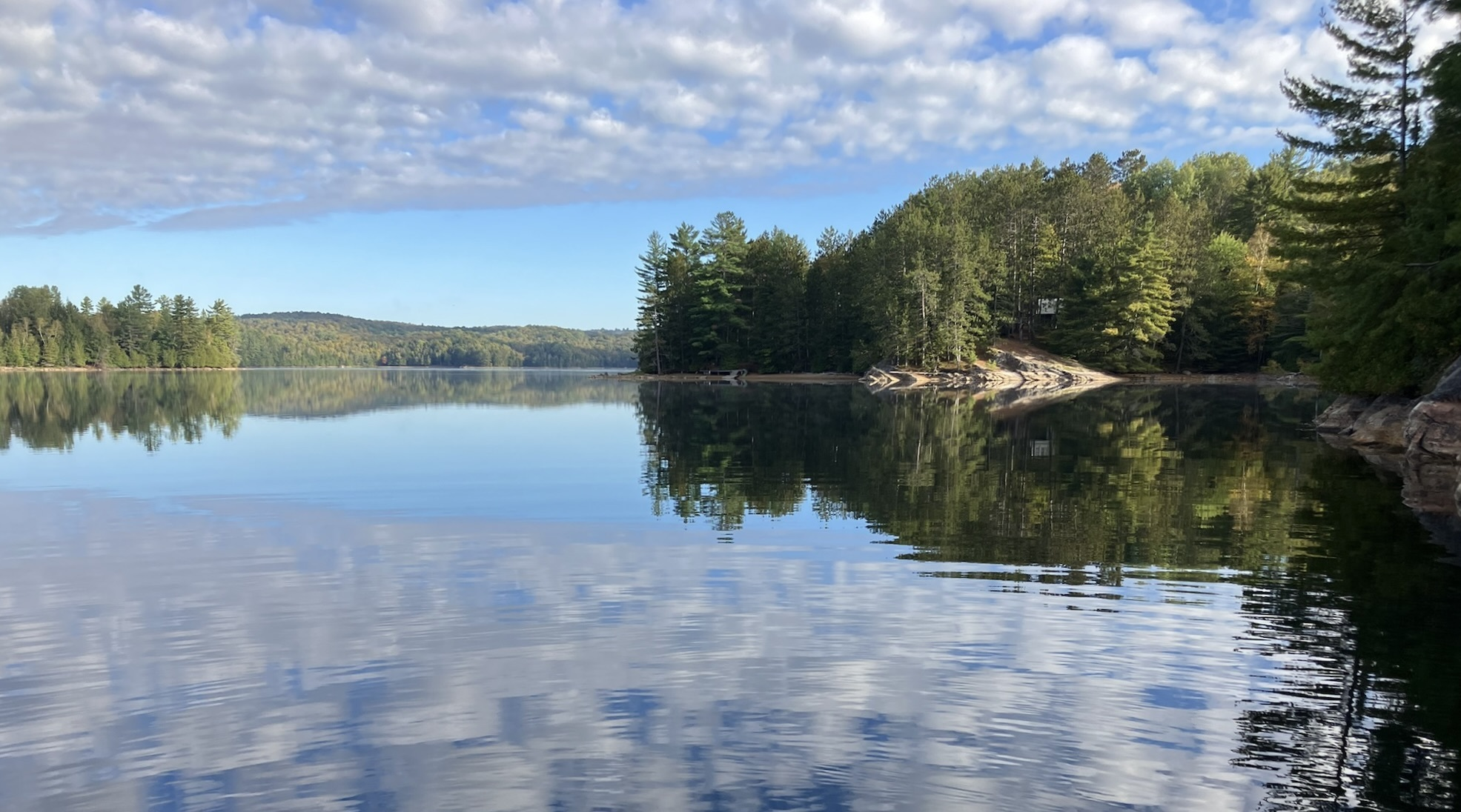
A partially cloudy day on the east-side of Farquhar Lake's southern bay

== Cottaging ==
Beautiful waterfront cottages are found on Farquhar Lake, averaging 2,000 square feet, combining modern and rustic styles. It is the largest of its surrounding lakes, such as Grace lake, Dark Lake, and Cardiff Lake. Fewer than 100 residents enjoy activities such as boating, fishing and water skiing.

== Fishing ==
Farquhar Lake has good fishing opportunities for Lake Trout, Smallmouth Bass, and several panfish species including Rock Bass, Yellow Perch and Pumpkinseed. Trout can be found in any depth during the winter and early spring, while they migrate deeper to colder water once the surface temperatures warm mid-spring. The Lake Trout population in Farquhar Lake is primarily planktivorous, so they do not often attain large sizes. Bass fishing is popular in the summer, when fish can be found in relatively shallow water in weed beds, off of rocky points or underneath submerged timber. Panfish can be found throughout shallow areas of the lake. Occasionally, Largemouth Bass have been caught by anglers, although the Ministry of Natural Resources has not confirmed an established population of this species within the lake.

== History ==
As early as 1590, Jesuit priests began searching for Huron Indians amongst the Mississauga and Ojibwa peoples in Haliburton County, Algonquin Park, and nearby areas. In 1951, copper objects were found at Farquhar Lake near Harcourt estimated to be two thousand years old. The nearby town of Wilberforce has a museum named after the historic Red Cross outpost house that previously operated in the area.

Joan Barton is a two-term councillor for Highlands East County whose father purchased land on Farquhar Lake when she was a child, hence the name Art Barton Lane which is a road found on the southeast section of the lake. Joan Barton supported the area for years as a councillor, environmentalist, and resident, tackling the short-term rental accommodations issue and fighting against the planned development of uranium exploration sites throughout Haliburton, with a proposed near her home in Wilberforce. Barton eventually retired near her district of Highlands East with her husband Paul Foulds.

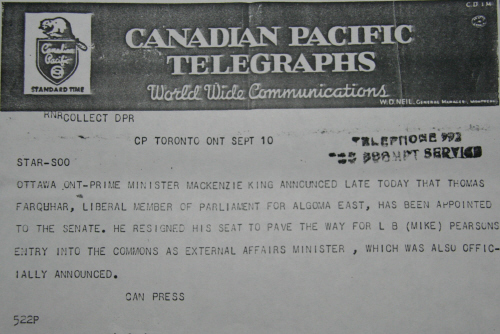
September 1948 telegraph from the Canadian Press indicating that Prime Minister MacKenzie King had appointed Thomas Farquhar to the Senate

Thomas Farquhar, a Canadian politician and businessman famous for Farquhar's Dairy, went into the mining business and in 1945 he founded Thos. Farquhar & Sons Co. Limited with his four sons in Northeastern Ontario where Farquhar Lake is located. Since copper was found under Farquhar Lake in 1950, Thomas Farquhar is likely its founder. Information about the mining sites near the lake can be found on the province's Ministry of Mines website.

Buxton Road is the main road leading to the east side of the lake, named after the Buxton family who still own property on the largest lot on that side.
