= List of lakes of Ontario: K =

This is a list of lakes of Ontario beginning with the letter K.

== Kaa–Kam ==
- Kaa Lake
- Kabaigon Lake
- Kabakwa Lake
- Kabamichigama Lake
- Kabania Lake
- Kabatay Lake
- Kabenung Lake
- Kabetako Lake
- Kabevun Lake
- Kabibonoka Lake
- Kabik Lake
- Kabikwabik Lake
- Kabina Lake
- Kabinakagami Lake
- Kabinakagamisis Lake
- Kabiskagami Lake
- Kabitotikwia Lake
- Kaboosa Lake
- Kabossakwa Lake
- Kaby Lake
- Kadiginebik Lake
- Kadota Lake
- Kagagee Lake
- Lake Kagawong
- Kagh Lake
- Kagianagami Lake
- Kagiano Lake
- Kaginot Lake
- Kaginu Lake
- Kago Lake
- Kahabeness Lake
- Kahmitiwajewunk Lake
- Kahnahmaykoosaysensikahk/Valhalla Lake
- Kahshahpiwi Lake
- Kahshe Lake
- Kaiashkons Lake
- Kaiser Lake
- Kajander Lake
- Kakabikitchiwan Lake
- Kakagi Lake
- Kakagiwizida Lake
- Kakakise Lake
- Kakakiwaganda Lake
- Kakanakwa Lake
- Kakapitam Lake
- Kakasamic Lake
- Kakinawao Lake
- Kalaco Lake
- Kalmar Lake
- Kalsas Lake
- Kalz Lake
- Kamanatogama Lake
- Kamangus Lake
- Kamaniskeg Lake
- Kame Lake
- Kamenisa Lake
- Kamikau Lake
- Kaminiskag Lake
- Kaminni Lake
- Kamiskotia Lake
- Kamp Lake
- Kamuck Lake
- Kamungishkamo Lake

== Kan–Kap ==
- Kanatan Lake
- Kane Lake
- Kaneesose Lake
- Kaneki Lake
- Kaness Lake
- Kanga Lake
- Kangaroo Lake (Kenora District)
- Kangaroo Lake (Thunder Bay District)
- Kangas Lake
- Kanichee Lake
- Kanitama Lake
- Kant Lake
- Kanuchuan Lake
- Kaopskikamak Lake
- Kaoskauta Lake
- Kapakita Lake
- Kapeesawatan Lake
- Kapesakosi Lake
- Kapik Lake
- Kapika Lake
- Kapikik Lake
- Kapikog Lake
- Kapikotongwa Lake
- Kapimchigama Lake
- Kapiskau Lake
- Kapiskong Lake
- Kapkichi Lake
- Kapuskasing Lake

== Kar–Kay ==
- Karas Lake
- Karchuk Lake
- Karen Lake (Timiskaming District)
- Karen Lake (Thunder Bay District)
- Karl Lake (Kenora District)
- Karl Lake (Sudbury District)
- Karol Lake
- Karstula Lake
- Kasabonika Lake
- Kasagiminnis Lake
- Kasakanta Lake
- Kasakawawia Lake
- Kasakokwog Lake
- Kasasway Lake
- Kasba Lake
- Kashabowie Lake
- Kashagawigamog Lake
- Kashaweogama Lake
- Kashbogama Lake
- Kashegaba Lake
- Kashishibog Lake
- Kashog Lake
- Kashwakamak Lake
- Kasmir Lake
- Kassagimini Lake
- Kasshabog Lake
- Kasten Lake
- Kastner Lake
- Katagi Lake
- Katchewanooka Lake
- Kates Lake
- Katherine Lake (Thunder Bay District)
- Katherine Lake (Sudbury District)
- Kathleen Lake (Populus Lake, Kenora District)
- Kathleen Lake (Grummett Township, Kenora District)
- Kathleen Lake (Sudbury District)
- Kathlyn Lake (Nipissing District)
- Kathlyn Lake (Kenora District)
- Katie Lake
- Katimiagamak Lake
- Katisha Lake
- Katodawa Lake
- Katoshaskepeko Lake
- Katrine Lake
- Loch Katrine
- Katzenbach Lake
- Kauffeldt Lake
- Kaufman Lake
- Kauskanee Lake
- Kavanagh Lake
- Kaw Lake
- Kawa Lake (Nipissing District)
- Kawa Lake (Thunder Bay District)
- Kawabatongog Lake
- Kawabesonka Lake
- Kawagama Lake
- Kawakamik Lake
- Kawakanika Lake (Cochrane District)
- Kawakanika Lake (Timiskaming District)
- Kawashe Lake
- Kawashkagama Lake
- Kawawaymog Lake
- Kawaweogama Lake
- Kawawia Lake
- Kawawiag Lake
- Kawawiagamak Lake
- Kaween Lake
- Kawene Lake (Rainy River District)
- Kawene Lake (Thunder Bay District)
- Kawepiti Lake
- Kawesaqua Lake
- Kawigamog Lake
- Kawijekiwa Lake
- Kawin Lake (Thunder Bay District)
- Kawin Lake (Kenora District)
- Kawinogans Lake
- Kawitos Lake
- Kawnipi Lake
- Kay Lake (Thunder Bay District)
- Kay Lake (Kenora District)
- Kaye Lake
- Kayedon Lake
- Kaylyn Lake

== Kd–Ke ==
- Kday Lake
- Keam Lake
- Kean Lake
- Keane Lake
- Kearney Lake (Mattawan)
- Kearney Lake (Sproule Township, Nipissing District)
- Kearney Lake (Timiskaming District)
- Kearns Lake (Thunder Bay District)
- Kearns Lake (Algoma District)
- Kearns Lake (Sudbury District)
- Keast Lake
- Keating Lake
- Keats Lake
- Kebskwasheshi Lake
- Kecheokagan Lake
- Kecil Lake
- Keckush Lake
- Kee Lake
- Keech Lake
- Keecheneekee Sahkaheekahn/Upper Goose Lake
- Keechewahshaykahmeeshek/Cairns Lake
- Keechewahweeyaykahmahk/McCusker Lake
- Keefer Lake (Rainy River District)
- Keefer Lake (Cochrane District)
- Keego Lake
- Keegos Lake
- Keel Lake
- Keeley Lake
- Keelor Lake (Algoma District)
- Keelor Lake (Thunder Bay District)
- Keelow Lake
- Keely Lake
- Keemle Lake
- Keenan Lake
- Keenoa Lake
- Keeper Lake
- Keeskwabitchow Lake
- Keewatin Lake (Rainy River District)
- Keewatin Lake (Kenora District)
- Keewaydin Lake
- Keeyask Lake
- Keezhik Lake
- Keg Lake (Kenora District)
- Keg Lake (Cochrane District)
- Kegmus Lake
- Kehl Lake
- Keigat Lake
- Keike Lake
- Keikewabik Lake
- Keiller Lake
- Keith Lake (Keith Township, Sudbury District)
- Keith Lake (Cochrane District)
- Keith Lake (Demorest Township, Sudbury District)
- Kekekuab Lake
- Kekekwa Lake
- Kelford Lake
- Kellar Lake
- Keller Lake
- Kellett Lake
- Kellington Lake
- Kellow Lake
- Kelly Lake (Renfrew County)
- Kelly Lake (Greater Sudbury)
- Kelly Lake (Sothman Township, Sudbury District)
- Kelly Lake (McNish Township, Sudbury District)
- Kelly Lake (Thunder Bay District)
- Kelly Lake (Kenora District)
- Kelly Lake (York Region)
- Kelly Lake (Algoma District)
- Kelly Lake (Nipissing District)
- Kelly Lake (Simcoe County)
- Kelly Lake (Haliburton County)
- Kellys Lake (Nipissing District)
- Kellys Lake (Renfrew County)
- Kellys Lake (Frontenac County)
- Kelsey Lake
- Kelsie Lake
- Kelso Lake (Sudbury District)
- Kelso Lake (Halton Region)
- Kelso Lake (Cochrane District)
- Kelter Lake
- Kelvin Lake (Timiskaming District)
- Kelvin Lake (Sudbury District)
- Kember Lake
- Kemp Lake (Manitoulin District)
- Kemp Lake (Kenora District)
- Kemp Lake (Rainy River District)
- Kemuel Lake
- Ken Harkes Lake
- Ken Lake
- Kena Lake
- Kenabic Lake
- Kenabigoons Lake
- Kenaja Lake
- Kenakskaniss Lake
- Kendall Lake (Kenora District)
- Kendall Lake (Rainy River District)
- Kenel Lake
- Kenese Lake
- Keneswabe Lake
- Kenetogami Lake
- Keneu Lake
- Kenewabik Lake
- Keni Lake
- Kenna Lake
- Kennabutch Lake
- Kennah Lake
- Kennard Lake
- Kennaway Lake
- Kenneally Lake
- Kennebec Lake
- Kennedy Lake (Clute Township, Cochrane District)
- Kennedy Lake (Timiskaming District)
- Kennedy Lake (Mewhinney Township, Cochrane District)
- Kennedy Lake (Royd Creek, Kenora District)
- Kennedy Lake (Osler Township, Nipissing District)
- Kennedy Lake (Algoma District)
- Kennedy Lake (Sudbury District)
- Kennedy Lake (Broderick Township, Kenora District)
- Kennedy Lake (McInnes River, Kenora District)
- Kennedy Lake (Hobbs Township, Nipissing District)
- Kennedy Lake (Stoddart Township, Cochrane District)
- Kennelly Lake
- Kennellys Lake
- Kenneth Lake (Nipissing District)
- Kenneth Lake (Thunder Bay District)
- Kenneth Lake (Timiskaming District)
- Kennewapekko Lake
- Kenney Lake
- Kennibik Lake
- Kennifick Lake
- Kenning Lake
- Kennisis Lake
- Kenny Lake (Rainy River District)
- Kenny Lake (Kenora District)
- Kenny Lake (Algoma District)
- Kenny Lake (Tempest Lake, Thunder Bay District)
- Kenny Lake (Simpson Island)
- Kenogami Lake
- Kenogaming Lake
- Kenogamisis Lake
- Kenogamissi Lake
- Kenoji Lake
- Kenora Lake
- Kenorain Lake
- Kenoshay Lake
- Kenossee Lake
- Kenozhe Lake (Kawawiag Creek, Kenora District)
- Kenozhe Lake (Opikeigen Lake, Kenora District)
- Kenshoe Lake
- Kent Lake
- Kentron Lake
- Kenty Lake
- Kenu Lake
- Keon Lake
- Keown Lake
- Kerfoot Lake
- Kerine Lake
- Kern Lake
- Kerney Lake
- Kernick Lake
- Kerr Lake (Lanark County)
- Kerr Lake (Timiskaming District)
- Kerr Lake (Rainy Lake, Rainy River District)
- Kerr Lake (Davison Lake, Rainy River District)
- Kerr Lake (Manitoulin District)
- Kerr Lake (Sudbury District)
- Kerr Lake (Lennox and Addington County)
- Kerria Lake
- Kerry Lake (Nipissing District)
- Kerry Lake (Timiskaming District)
- Kershaw Lake
- Kerswill Lake
- Kervin Lake
- Kerwin Lake
- Kesa Lake
- Kesagami Lake
- Kesaka Lake
- Keswil Lake
- Ketch Lake
- Ketchikan Lake
- Ketchini Lake
- Ketchiwaboose Lake
- Ketchup Lake
- Kett Lake
- Kettle Lake (Munro Township, Cochrane District)
- Kettle Lake (Sudbury District)
- Kettle Lake (Thunder Bay District)
- Kettle Lake (Nipissing District)
- Kettle Lake (Timmins)
- Kettle's Lake
- Kettyle Lake
- Key Lake (Sudbury District)
- Key Lake (Rainy River District)
- Keyes Lake
- Keyhole Lake (Thunder Bay District)
- Keyhole Lake (Muskoka District)
- Keynote Lake
- Keys Lake
- Keyuk Lake
- Kezik Lake

== Ki ==
- Kibble Lake
- Kibeong Lake
- Kibler Lake
- Kickley Lake
- Kid Lake (Sudbury District)
- Kid Lake (Kenora District)
- Kidd Lake (Parry Sound District)
- Kidd Lake (Timiskaming District)
- Kiddman Lake
- Kidglove Lake
- Kidney Lake (Nipissing District)
- Kidney Lake (Nixon Township, Cochrane District)
- Kidney Lake (Timiskaming District)
- Kidney Lake (Colquhoun Township, Cochrane District)
- Kidney Lake (Sudbury District)
- Kidney Lake (Frontenac County)
- Kight Lake
- Kije-Kwe Lake
- Kilbarry Lake
- Kilbourne Lake
- Kilburn Lake
- Kildeer Lake
- Kilgour Lake (Thunder Bay District)
- Kilgour Lake (Kenora District)
- Kilkenny Lake
- Killala Lake
- Killarney Lake (Timiskaming District)
- Killarney Lake (Manitoulin District)
- Killdeer Lake (Cochrane District)
- Killdeer Lake (Sudbury District)
- Killeen Lake
- Killenbeck Lake
- Killer Lake
- Killick Lake
- Killoran Lake (Northumberland County)
- Killoran Lake (Kenora District)
- Kilpatrick Lake (Sudbury District)
- Kilpatrick Lake (Timiskaming District)
- Kilross Lake
- Kilrush Lake
- Kilty Lake
- Kilvert Lake
- Kim Lake
- Kimbal Lake
- Kimball Lake
- Kimber Lake
- Kimmewin Lake
- Kimmins Lake
- Kin Lake (Kenora District)
- Kin Lake (Sudbury District)
- Kinabik Lake
- Kinago Lake
- Kinahan Lake
- Kinasao Lake
- Kincaid Lake
- Kindiogami Lake
- Kindle Lake
- Kindogan Lake
- Kindreds Lake
- Kineras Lake
- Kinewan Lake
- King Lake (St. Ignace Island)
- King Lake (Parry Sound District)
- King Lake (Cochrane District)
- King Lake (Empress Creek, Thunder Bay District)
- King Lake (Sudbury District)
- King Lake (Kenora District)
- King Lake (Terrace Bay)
- King Lake (Lennox and Addington County)
- Kingdon Lake
- Kingfish Lake (Thunder Bay District)
- Kingfish Lake (Kenora District)
- Kingfisher Lake (Kenora District)
- Kingfisher Lake (Cochrane District)
- Kingfisher Lake (Thunder Bay District)
- Kingfisher Lake (Nipissing District)
- Kinghorn Lake
- Kinglet Lake
- Kingroy Lake
- Kings Lake (Hastings County)
- Kings Lake (Renfrew County)
- Kings Lake (Rainy River District)
- Kings Lake (Frontenac County)
- Kings Lake (Algoma District)
- Kingscote Lake
- Kingsford Lake
- Kingshott Lake
- Kingsland Lake
- Kingston Lake
- Kingstone Lake
- Kingswood Lake
- Kiniwabik Lake
- Kink Lake
- Kinloch Lake
- Kinmoapiku Lake
- Kinmount Lake
- Kinnett Lake
- Kinniwabi Lake
- Kinniwap Lake
- Kinnyu Lake
- Kino Lake
- Kinogama Lake (Thunder Bay District)
- Kinogama Lake (Sudbury District)
- Kinogocheship Lake
- Kinozhe Lake
- Kioshkokwi Lake
- Kipawa Lake
- Kippen Lake
- Kipping Lake
- Kirby Lake (Thunder Bay District)
- Kirby Lake (Sudbury District)
- Kirk Lake (Timiskaming District)
- Kirk Lake (Algoma District)
- Kirk Lake (Rainy River District)
- Kirk Lake (Kenora District)
- Kirkby Lake
- Kirkfield Lake
- Kirkham Lake
- Kirkland Lake
- Kirko Lake
- Kirkpatrick Lake
- Kirkup Lake
- Kirkwood Lake (Frontenac County)
- Kirkwood Lake (Haliburton County)
- Kirsten Lake
- Kirstine Lake
- Kiruna Lake
- Kishikas Lake
- Kishkebus Lake
- Kishkutena Lake
- Kishquabik Lake
- Kistigan Lake
- Kitchen Lake (Cochrane District)
- Kitchen Lake (Thunder Bay District)
- Kitchen Lake (Frontenac County)
- Kitchenham Lake
- Kitchie Lake
- Kitchiming Lake
- Kitchin Lake
- Kitchiwatchi Lake
- Kite Lake (Timiskaming District)
- Kite Lake (Nipissing District)
- Kite Lake (Kenora District)
- Kitt Lake
- Kitten Lake
- Kitts Lake (Renfrew County)
- Kitts Lake (Sudbury District)
- Kitts Lake (Hastings County)
- Kittson Lake
- Kitty Lake
- Kiyask Lake
- Kizhik Lake

== Kl–Kn ==
- Klaxon Lake
- Kleim Lake
- Klemmer Lake
- Klersy Lake
- Klinestiver Lake
- Klob Lake
- Klock Lake
- Klotz Lake
- Kluck Lake
- Knarf Lake
- Knauf Lake
- Knee Lake
- Kneecap Lake
- Knife Lake (Kenora District)
- Knife Lake (Sudbury District)
- Knife Lake (Haliburton County)
- Knife Lake (Rainy River District)
- Knife Lake (Algoma District)
- Knight Lake (Michaud Township, Cochrane District)
- Knight Lake (Sudbury District)
- Knight Lake (Timiskaming District)
- Knight Lake (Thunder Bay District)
- Knight Lake (Rainy River District)
- Knight Lake (Kesagami Lake, Cochrane District)
- Knob Lake (Kenora District)
- Knob Lake (Sudbury District)
- Knobby Lake
- Knobel Lake
- Knocker Lake
- Knothole Lake
- Knott Lake
- Knottypine Lake
- Knowles Lake (Kenora District)
- Knowles Lake (Sudbury District)
- Knowlton Lake
- Knox Lake (Sudbury District)
- Knox Lake (Thunder Bay District)
- Knox Lake (Kenora District)
- Knuckle Lake
- Knucklethumb Lake
- Knudsen Lake
- Knupp Lake
- Knute Lake
- Knutson Lake

== Ko ==
- Koandowango Lake
- Kohler Lake
- Lake Koivukoski
- Koko Lake (French Township, Nipissing District)
- Koko Lake (Dickson Township, Nipissing District)
- Kokoko Lake
- Kolari Lake
- Kolosta Lake
- Komak Lake
- Komer Lake
- Konigson Lake
- Konk Lake
- Kootchie Lake
- Kopje Lake
- Kopka Lake
- Korky Lake
- Korpela Lake (Eisenhower Township, Sudbury District)
- Korpela Lake (Blackburn Township, Sudbury District)
- Korpi Lake
- Kortright Lake
- Koshlong Lake
- Koski Lake
- Kosmerly Lake
- Koss Lake
- Koster Lake
- Kostka Lake
- Kotyk Lake
- Koval Lake
- Kowastigiman Lake
- Kowbel Lake
- Kowisis Lake
- Kowka Lake
- Kozak Lake

== Kr–Ky ==
- Kramer Lake
- Kranck Lake
- Krapek Lake
- Krebs Lake
- Kretzel Lake
- Kring Lake
- Krisko Lake
- Kriwoy Lake
- Krug Lake
- Ku Lake
- Kuehl Lake
- Kuiack Lake
- Kukagami Lake
- Kukukahu Lake
- Kukukus Lake
- Kulas Lake
- Kumska Lake
- Kupfer Lake
- Kurtzwig Lake
- Kus Lake
- Kushog Lake (Haliburton County)
- Kushog Lake (Kenora District)
- Kusti Lake
- Kuwasda Lake
- Kwagama Lake
- Kwinkwaga Lake
- Kwitosse Lake
- Kwonishi Lake
- Kynman Lake
- Kyte Lake
- Kyushk Lake
