= Grass Lake (Haliburton County) =

- Location within Ontario
- Location: Haliburton County, Ontario
- Coordinates: 45.041°N 78.536°W
- Type: Glacial lake
- Primary inflows: Drag River
- Primary outflows: Burnt River
- Basin countries: Canada
- Frozen: Mid-December to Late April

Grass Lake is a lake in Haliburton County, Ontario, Canada. It is in the "cottage country" area of central Ontario and has many cottages along its shores. It is connected to Head Lake in the east and Kashagawigamog Lake to the west. Like other lakes in the five lake chain, Grass Lake is essentially a widening of the Drag River, which flows from Drag Lake into the chain of lakes at Head Lake and out again at Canning Lake where a dam is controlled by the Trent–Severn Waterway.

Residents of Grass Lake are represented by the Grass Lake Association.

== Ecology ==
Watersheds Canada found in a 2015 survey, "93% of properties on Grass Lake had submergent plants while 58% of properties had emergent vegetation which is an important source of habitat for fish, and other aquatic organisms. Floating vegetation was found less frequently on Grass Lake but is still an important part of the aquatic ecosystem, giving habitat to birds, frogs, dragonflies, and other wildlife." On the topic of wildlife habitats, the same survey found, "(The) most common types of nearshore habitat on Grass Lake were terrestrial logs (and) overhanging vegetation. Most properties on Grass Lake had some amount of habitat present."

== See also ==
- List of lakes of Ontario
