= Koshlong Creek =

- Location of the mouth of the creek in Southern Ontario

Location
- Country: Canada
- Province: Ontario
- Region: Central Ontario
- County: Haliburton
- Municipality: Highlands East

Physical characteristics
- Source
  - coordinates: 44°57′35″N 78°24′33″W
  - elevation: 395 m (1,296 ft)
- Mouth: Burnt River
  - coordinates: 44°57′48″N 78°30′07″W
  - elevation: 331 m (1,086 ft)

Basin features
- River system: Great Lakes Basin

Koshlong Creek is a river in geographic Glamorgan Township in the municipality of Highlands East, Haliburton County in Central Ontario, Canada. The river is in the Great Lakes Basin and is a left tributary of the Burnt River.

The creek begins at Haliburton County Road 3, and flows west into the east end of Koshlong Lake. It exits the southwest end of the lake controlled by a dam, and flows west to its mouth at the Burnt River. The Burnt River flows via the Kawartha lakes, the Otonabee River and the Trent River to Lake Ontario.

== See also ==
- List of rivers of Ontario
