= Salerno Lake =

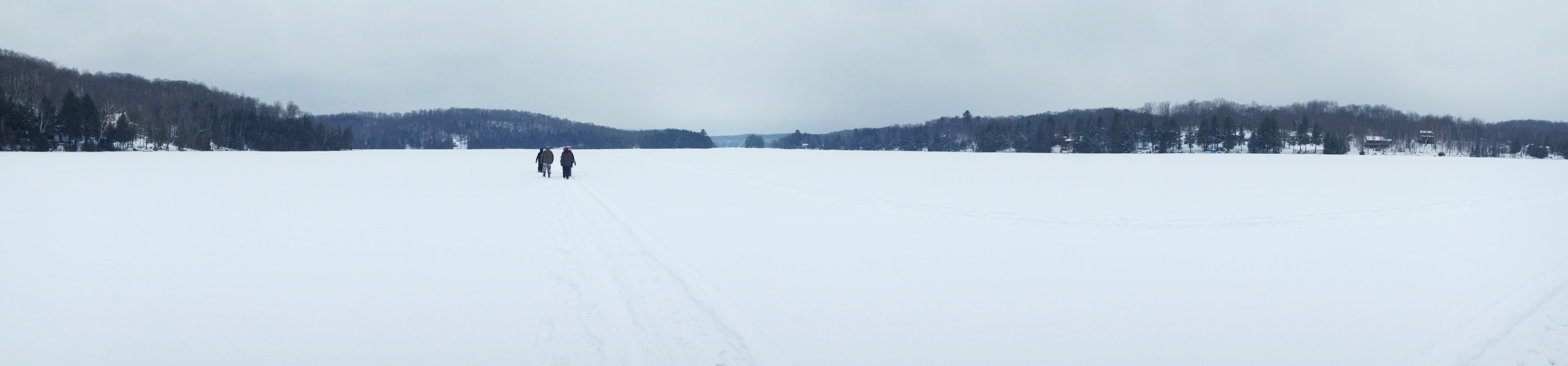
- Salerno Lake in winter

- Location in southern Ontario
- Location: Haliburton County, Ontario
- Group: Kawartha lakes
- Coordinates: 44°51′34″N 78°29′07″W
- Type: Lake
- Part of: Great Lakes Basin
- Primary inflows: Salerno Creek from White Lake
- Primary outflows: Salerno Creek to the Irondale River
- Basin countries: Canada
- Max. length: 5.8 km (3.6 mi)
- Max. width: 0.75 km (0.47 mi)
- Max. depth: 45 feet (14 m)
- Surface elevation: 297 metres (974 ft)
- Islands: 1 small unnamed island, several other immersed rocks

Salerno Lake, formerly Devil's Lake, is a lake in the municipalities of Highlands East and Minden Hills in Haliburton County in Central Ontario, Canada. The lake is part of the Kawartha Lakes, and lies in the Great Lakes Basin. It is part of cottage country approximately a 2 1/2-hour drive away from Toronto.

== Geography ==
Salerno Lake is about 5.8 kilometres (3.6 mi) long. It is a narrow lake, at most 750 metres (2,460 ft), that resembles a large river. The lake is in a big valley, and the water depth increases quickly. Most places in the lake are about 25 feet (7.6 m) deep, but there are two spots where it can get as deep as 45 feet (14 m).

Nearby communities are Gooderham, Irondale, and Kinmount; Haliburton is a 25–35 minute drive away.

The primary inflow, at the southwest, is Salerno Creek from White Lake. The primary outflow, at the northwest, is also Salerno Creek, which flows over a dam to the Irondale River, then via the Burnt River, the Kawartha Lakes, the Otonabee River and the Trent River to Lake Ontario.

== History ==
Like many water bodies in this system, the lake was used to transport logs in the 19th and 20th Century.

== Etymology ==
Originally named Devil's Lake, the name was changed to Salerno to commemorate the prominent role of the Canadian Army in the Salerno landings of 1943 at the Italian city of that name. The name change was suggested by the government of Ontario and published on a federal map in 1944 as a distinctive name in order to eliminate the common name "Devil". The name Salerno Lake was eventually approved by the Canadian Board on Geographical Names in 1953.

== Natural history ==
Salerno Lake is home to smallmouth bass, largemouth bass, perch, walleye, and muskie. It also has rock bass, sunfish, mussels, and crayfish.

== Cottagers' Association ==
The Salerno/Devil's Lake Cottagers' Association is over 40 years old. It consists of a board of directors that deal with issues and organize events such as the annual canoe race and the Canada Day fireworks. The association encourages all cottagers to become a member, and sends out a newsletter by mail.

== See also ==
- List of lakes in Ontario
