= Bitter Lake (Ontario) =

- Location within Ontario
- Location: Dysart et al, Haliburton, Ontario
- Coordinates: 45°10′18″N 78°34′35″W
- Type: Lake
- Max. length: 1.7 km (1.1 mi)
- Max. width: 0.6 km (0.37 mi)
- Surface elevation: 413 m (1,355 ft)

Bitter Lake is a lake in the Trent River and Lake Ontario drainage basins located in the municipality of Dysart et al, Haliburton County, Ontario, Canada, about 15 kilometres (9 mi) northwest of the community of Haliburton.

The lake is 1.7 kilometres (1.1 mi) long and 0.6 kilometres (0.4 mi) wide and lies at an elevation of 413 metres (1,355 ft). There are no significant inflows. The primary outflow is an unnamed creek that flows through Tedious Lake to the Redstone River, a tributary of the Gull River.

== See also ==
- List of lakes in Ontario
