= 2014 Haliburton County municipal elections =

Local election in Ontario, Canada

Elections were held in Haliburton County, Ontario on October 27, 2014 in conjunction with municipal elections across the province.

== Haliburton County Council ==
The Haliburton County Council consists of the reeves and deputy reeves of the four constituent municipalities. A warden is elected from the eight members.

Position	Elected
Algonquin Highlands Reeve	Carol Moffatt (acclaimed)
Algonquin Highlands Deputy Reeve	(chosen from council)
Dysart et al Reeve	Murray Fearrey
Dysart et al Deputy Reeve	Andrea Roberts
Highlands East Reeve	Dave Burton
Highlands East Deputy Reeve	(chosen from council)
Minden Hills Reeve	Brent Devolin
Minden Hills Deputy Reeve	Cheryl Murdoch

== Algonquin Highlands ==
Reeve Candidate	Vote	%
Carol Moffatt (X)	Acclaimed	

== Dysart et al ==
Reeve Candidate	Vote	%
Murray Fearrey (X)	3,075	53.82
Janis Parker	2,639	46.18

== Highlands East ==
Reeve Candidate	Vote	%
Dave Burton (X)	1,959	59.20
Steve Cosentino	1,350	40.80

== Minden Hills ==
Reeve Candidate	Vote	%
Brent Devolin	2,159	46.01
Brigitte Gall	1,596	34.02
Barb Reid (X)	937	19.97
