= Big Hawk Lake =

Lake in Ontario, Canada

- Location within Ontario
- Location: Algonquin Highlands, Haliburton County, Ontario
- Coordinates: 45°09′41″N 78°44′09″W
- Basin countries: Canada
- Max. length: 4.7 km (2.9 mi)
- Max. width: 3.7 km (2.3 mi)
- Surface elevation: 355 m (1,165 ft)

Location of Big Hawk Lake in Ontario

Big Hawk Lake is a lake in the Trent River and Lake Ontario drainage basins in Algonquin Highlands, Haliburton County, Ontario, Canada.

The lake is about 4.7 kilometres (2.9 mi) long and 3.7 kilometres (2.3 mi) wide and lies at an elevation of 355 metres (1,165 ft) about 3 kilometres (1.9 mi) northeast of Ontario Highway 35. The primary inflow is the Kennisis River arriving from Nunikani Lake over Nunikani Dam at the north, and a channel from Little Hawk Lake at the south. Secondary inflows are Blackcat Creek at the northwest and unnamed creeks from Sherborne Lake and Big Brothe Lake at the west. The primary outflow, at the southwest and controlled by the Big Hawk Lake Dam, is the Kennisis River to Halls Lake.

== Types Of fish include ==
- Rock Bass
- Small Mouth Bass
- Large Mouth Bass
- Yellow Perch
- Lake Whitefish
- Brook Trout
- Ninespine stickleback
- Rainbow smelt
- Burbot
- Lake trout
- White Sucker
- Splake
- Brown Bullhead catfish
- Channel Catfish
- White Perch

== See also ==
- List of lakes in Ontario
