= Boshkung Lake =

Lake in Central Ontario, Canada

- Boshkung
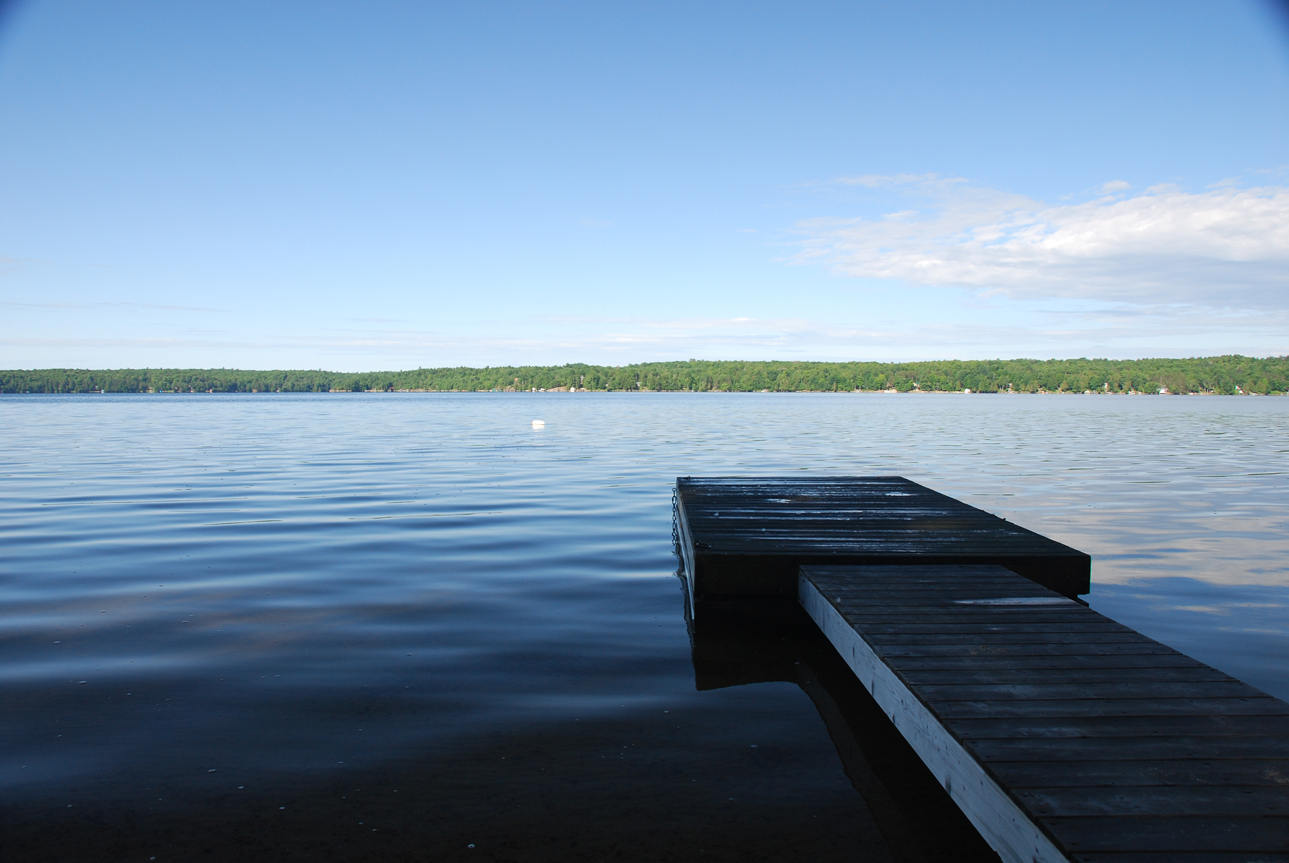
- Boshkung on a calm morning

- Location in Southern Ontario
- Location: Haliburton County, Ontario
- Coordinates: 45°03′58″N 78°43′46″W
- Part of: Great Lakes Basin
- Primary inflows: Gull River, Kennisis River, Boshkung River
- Primary outflows: Gull River
- Basin countries: Canada
- Max. length: 5.7 kilometres (3.5 mi)
- Max. width: 3.1 kilometres (1.9 mi)
- Average depth: 71 metres (233 ft)
- Surface elevation: 304 metres (997 ft)

Boshkung Lake, also known by its historic name Lake Boshkung, or affectionately as 'Big Boshkung', is a lake in the township of Algonquin Highlands, Haliburton County in Central Ontario, Canada. It is located near Buttermilk Falls and has been a common cottage and recreation destination with a rich history that includes: logging, camping, and even some farming activities.

== Hydrology and structures ==
Boshkung is diamond-shaped with the two axes running roughly north-south and east-west. The longer north-south axis is about 5.7 kilometres (3.5 mi) long and the east-west 3.1 kilometres (1.9 mi). The lake has a maximum known depth of 71 metres (233 feet). It is one of several lakes that make up the Gull River Watershed. One of three primary inflows is the Gull River from Beech Lake on the east side of the lake. Other inflows are the Kennisis River over the Buttermilk Falls from Halls Lake at the north, and the Boshkung River over the Buck Slides Dam from Kushog Lake at the west. The primary outflow is the continuation of the Gull River and its extensive watershed system downstream through a narrows to Little Boshkung Lake at the south, whose waters eventually flow into Balsam Lake and via the Trent–Severn Waterway to Lake Ontario. There is one named bay, Echo Bay, on the east side (formerly 'Loon Echo Bay'), south of the inflow of the Beech River. It also has a handful of small islands, two of which have seasonally occupied structures, at Echo Island in Echo Bay, and on one of the Gull Islands close to the lake's south end. Two Tree Island sits near the west shore. Boshkung experienced a reported 117 year high water event in the spring of 2013 pursuant to the Ontario Ministry of Natural Resources historical data. This flooding, including damages, impacted a wide range of lakes and communities in the Gull River and other watershed regions.

== History ==
The first non-indigenous settler was Isaac Hunter who arrived in 1852. The early industry was logging of old growth white pine; raw logs were processed at water-powered mills on the Trent–Severn Waterway, to which they were floated via the Gull River, and at Buttermilk Falls. The lake was a children's camp destination for roughly 30 years until the middle of the 1960s, namely that of the Sherwood Forest Camp (1934–64). Since that time, the lake today is a cottage and recreation destination. It also has a history rich in Canadian culture with families who lovingly claim Boshkung as either a home or home away from home. This includes, but is not limited to: Canadian naturalist and painter Robert Bateman, his brother and fellow artist Ross, and their families (Boshkung, Inc.). Boshkung means 'place of grassy narrows' and has also included spellings of 'Bushconk', 'Bushkank', 'Bosking', 'Buskank', and 'Boskung'.

== Settlements ==
The community of Buttermilk Falls is at the north end, Boshkung Lake is at the west, and Carnarvon in the adjacent township of Minden Hills just to the southeast. The lake lies within the jurisdiction of the municipality of the Township of Algonquin Highlands.

== Transportation ==
Ontario Highway 35 follows the northeast shore of the lake, while Ontario Highway 118 crosses the narrows at the south end.

== See also ==
- List of lakes in Ontario
