= Silver Lake (Ontario) =

Silver Lake may refer to one of twenty-two lakes and two dispersed rural communities of that name in Ontario, Canada:

== Communities ==
- Silver Lake, in Peterborough County, part of the municipality of Trent Lakes
- Silver Lake, in Renfrew County, part of the municipality of Bonnechere Valley

== Lakes ==
- Silver Lake (Kawartha Lakes), on the Gull River
- Silver Lake (Lanark–Frontenac), in Lanark and Frontenac Counties
