= Koshlong Lake =

Lake in Central Ontario, Canada

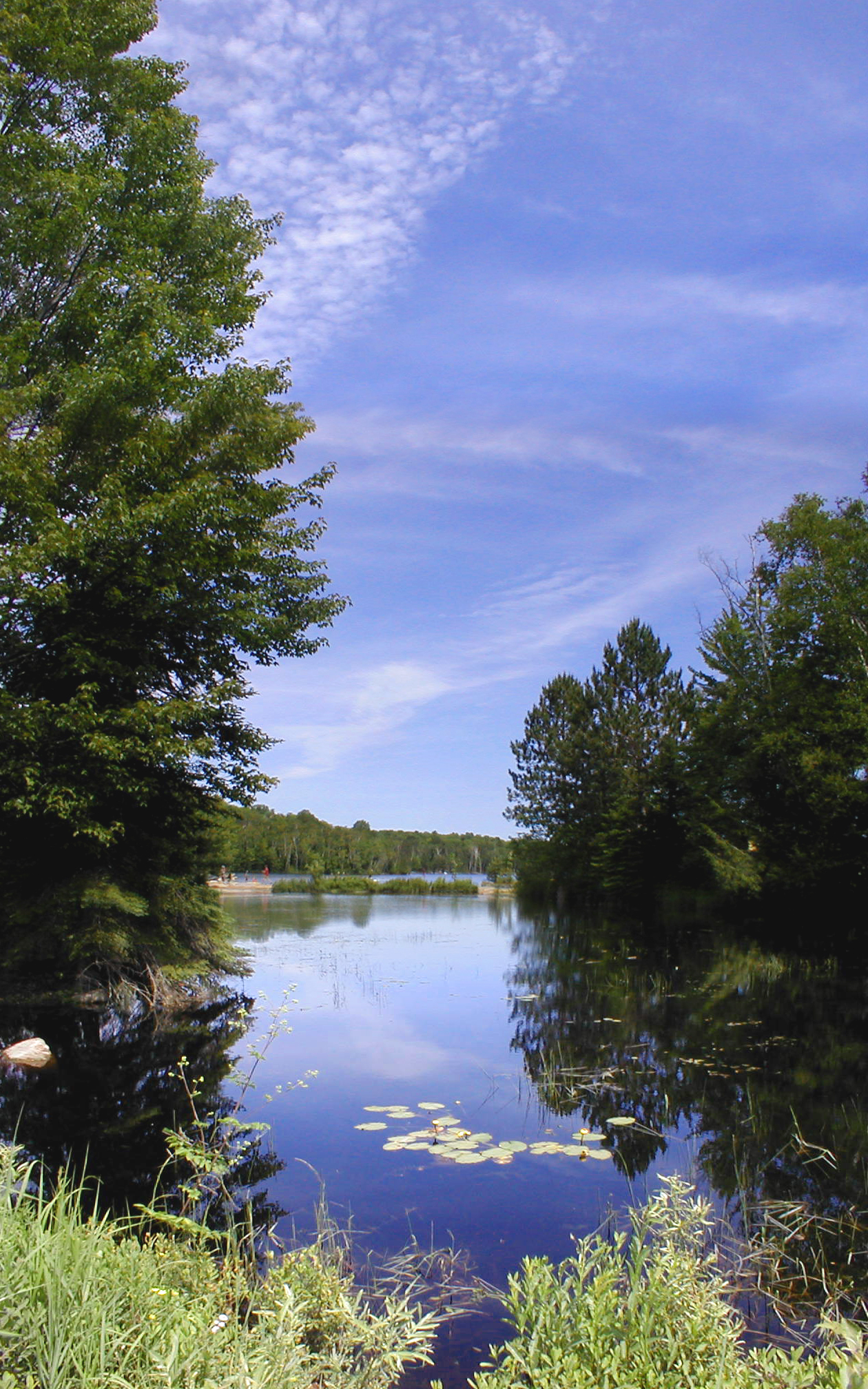
- Koshlong Lake from YMCA Camp Wanakita

- Location in Southern Ontario
- Location: Haliburton County, Ontario
- Coordinates: 44°58′23″N 78°29′07″W
- Part of: Great Lakes Basin
- Primary inflows: Koshlong Creek
- Primary outflows: Koshlong Creek
- Basin countries: Canada
- Max. length: 5.7 kilometres (3.5 mi)
- Max. width: 2.0 kilometres (1.2 mi)
- Surface elevation: 348 metres (1,142 ft)

Koshlong Lake is a lake in the municipalities of Highlands East and Dysart et al, Haliburton County in Central Ontario, Canada. It is part of the Great Lakes Basin.

Most of the lake is in geographic Glamorgan Township in Highlands East; only the very northwest tip is in geographic Dysart Township in Dysart et al.

The primary inflow, at the east, is Koshlong Creek. The primary outflow is also Koshlong Creek, at the southwest and controlled by a dam, that flows to the Burnt River, which in turn flows via the Kawartha lakes, the Otonabee River and the Trent River to Lake Ontario.

YMCA Camp Wanakita is located on the lake.

== See also ==
- List of lakes in Ontario
