= Silver Lake (Kawartha Lakes) =

Lake in southern Ontario, Canada

- Location in Southern Ontario
- Location: Kawartha Lakes, Ontario
- Group: Kawartha Lakes
- Coordinates: 44°41′03″N 78°47′57″W
- Type: lake
- Part of: Lake Ontario drainage basin
- Primary inflows: Gull River
- Primary outflows: Gull River
- Basin countries: Canada
- Max. length: 1,300 m (4,300 ft)
- Max. width: 800 m (2,600 ft)
- Surface area: 67.75 hectares (167 acres)
- Max. depth: 14.63 m (48.0 ft)
- Residence time: 1 year
- Surface elevation: 258 metres (846 ft)

Silver Lake is a small lake in the city of Kawartha Lakes in Central Ontario, Canada. Located near the community of Coboconk, it is the lowest lake on the Gull River, a drainage basin that supplies water at its mouth to Balsam Lake at the top of the Trent-Severn Waterway. Like many other lakes in the Kawarthas, Silver Lake lies in a depression formed between the Precambrian granite to the north, and the Ordovician limestone to the south.

== Geography ==
Silver Lake forms a portion of the boundary between the geographic townships of Somerville and Bexley. It is the southernmost lake in a chain of reservoirs feeding the Trent-Severn Waterway at its highest point.

The primary inflow is the Gull River arriving at the north from Shadow Lake. There are three unnamed secondary inflows: one at the east, and two at the southwest. The primary outflow, at the southeast, is also the Gull River, which flows to its mouth at Balsam Lake. Balsam Lake flows via the main Kawartha Lakes chain, the Otonabee River and the Trent River to the Bay of Quinte on Lake Ontario.

== Geology ==
The lake sits atop the dividing line between the Precambrian granite Canadian Shield to the north, and the Paleozoic and Ordovician limestone to the south. Granite outcroppings can be seen beginning at the midpoint of the lake, including a small island in the north end of the lake with a cottage built upon it. On the south-east end, the limestone cuesta, which marks the boundary of the limestone and granite north of the lake, rises as a sheer cliff face several metres out of the water, following the length of the river southwest through Coboconk.

== Weather ==
An F1 (possibly an F2) tornado touched down and crossed the lake at around 2:45pm on July 26, 2008. Severe weather warnings were in effect at the time. Large areas of forest were destroyed on either side of the lake, but no injuries or substantial damage to cottages was reported.

== See also ==
- List of lakes in Ontario
