= Gull Lake (Ontario) =

Lake in Haliburton County, Ontario, Canada

- Location within Ontario
- Location: Haliburton County, Ontario
- Coordinates: 44°51′14″N 78°46′36″W
- Basin countries: Canada
- Surface area: 995.1 ha (2,459 acres)
- Max. depth: 49.1 m (161 ft)
- Surface elevation: 269.7 m (885 ft)

Gull Lake is a lake in Haliburton County, south of Minden, on the Gull River. The community of Miners Bay is located at its southern extremity. It was designated for Lake Trout Management by the Ministry of Natural Resources in 2006.

Gull Lake is the name of several other lakes in Ontario, Canada:

- Gull Lake, Muskoka. The town of Gravenhurst is located on its shores.
- Gull Lake, Timiskaming District. It is the source for drinking water for the community of Kirkland Lake, and it is most popular for bass fishing.

There are other Gull Lakes in Ontario:

- Gull Lake (Sudbury District), near Markstay-Warren
- Gull Lake (Temagami), Nipissing District
- Gull Lake (Cochrane District)
- Gull Lake (Butcher Township, Algoma District)
- Gull Lake (Hawkins Township, Algoma District)
- Gull Lake (Parry Sound District)
- Gull Lake (Kenora District), near Dryden.
- Gull Lake (Lister Township, Nipissing District)
- Gull Lake (Lennox and Addington County)

== See also ==
- List of lakes in Ontario
