= Percy Lake (Ontario) =

Lake in Haliburton County, Ontario, Canada

- Location within Ontario
- Location: Ontario
- Coordinates: 45.213°N 78.360°W
- Primary outflows: via dam, and creek to Haliburton Lake, at western side of Percy Lake.
- Basin countries: Canada
- Shore length^{1}: sandy beach on eastern shore, with much driftwood
- ^{1} Shore length is not a well-defined measure.

Percy Lake is a lake of Ontario, Canada, located west of the southern portion of Algonquin Park in the municipality of Dysart et al, Ontario in Haliburton County. It is located to the east of Haliburton Lake. Several cottages have been built on the northern shore of Percy Lake, and much of its southern portion is only accessible by water. Between the northern shore, and the southern shore of Percy Lake, are the "Narrows". The narrows is a narrow opening to the northern, and southern part of the lake.

== See also ==
- List of lakes in Ontario
- Haliburton, Ontario
