= Burnt River =

Burnt River may refer to:

- the Burnt River (Ontario) in Ontario, Canada
- the community of Burnt River, Ontario
- Burnt River (Oregon), tributary of the Snake River in eastern Oregon, US
