= Kashagawigamog Lake =

- Location within Ontario
- Location: Haliburton County, Ontario
- Coordinates: 45.0057°N 78.5679°W
- Type: Glacial lake
- Primary inflows: Drag River
- Primary outflows: Burnt River
- Basin countries: Canada
- Surface area: 817 Hectares (2,019 acres)
- Frozen: Mid-December to Late April
- Islands: Puffers Island

Kashagawigamog Lake is a lake in Haliburton County, Ontario, Canada. It is in the "cottage country" area of central Ontario and has many cottages along its shores. It is the central lake in a five-lake chain running southwest from the town of Haliburton to as far as Minden. Connected to Grass Lake and Head Lake to the northeast, Soyers Lake to the northwest, and Canning Lake to the south, the lake is long and narrow. The lake is essentially a widening of the Drag River, which flows from Drag Lake into the chain of lakes at Head Lake and out again at Canning Lake where a dam is controlled by the Trent-Severn Waterway.

Residents of Kashawigamog Lake are represented by the Lake Kashagawigamog Organization.

== Name ==
The name Kashagawigamog is an Anishnaabeg name meaning “lake of long and winding waters.”

== Geography ==
The lake is in the Great Lakes Basin with its primary inflow being from the Drag River and the primary outflow controlled by dams is the Burnt River. The lake consists of two basins connected by a narrow channel, the southwest basin being a little larger and wider than the northeast basin. Most of the shoreline is developed with cottages and resorts, but these are largely hidden from view by deciduous and conifer trees that grow to the water’s edge. Granite bedrock surrounding the lake is typically covered by a thin layer of topsoil, with a few rock out-crops and sand beaches across the shore as well. There is one notable island known as Puffers Island, which is located in the southwest basin and supports four cottages.

== History ==
The lake has served as an important passageway for First Nations peoples travelling to traditional hunting grounds and for early European settlers arriving to the lake in the late 1800s. It was chosen as a transportation route for lumber to be delivered south during the region's early lumbering years. Kashagawigamog Lake and adjoining Canning Lake were also the first waterway links between the villages of Minden and Haliburton before primary roads were completed in 1868. With the completion of the roads linking the area to southern Ontario, Kashagawigamog became home to the oldest cottaging history in the county and the highest development.

== Ecology ==
Watersheds Canada found in a 2015 survey that 74% of properties on Kashagawigamog Lake had submergent aquatic plants while 24% of properties had emergent vegetation which is an important source of habitat for the lake's fish and other aquatic organisms. Floating vegetation was found less frequently on Kashagawigamog Lake but is still an important part of the lake's aquatic ecosystem, giving habitat to the area's birds, frogs, dragonflies, and other wildlife. The most common types of nearshore habitat observed on Kashagawigamog Lake were terrestrial logs, followed overhanging vegetation. In the same survey it was found that there were invasive species present in the lake's ecosystem such as Eurasian milfoil and Purple loosestrife.

== See also ==
- List of lakes in Ontario
