= Redstone River (Haliburton County, Ontario) =

- Location of the mouth of the Redstone River in southern Ontario.

Location
- Country: Canada
- Province: Ontario
- Region: Central Ontario
- County: Haliburton
- Municipality: Dysart et al

Physical characteristics
- Source: Upper Redstone Lake
  - coordinates: 45°20′51″N 78°26′38″W
  - elevation: 464 m (1,522 ft)
- Mouth: Green Lake on the Gull River
  - coordinates: 45°06′27″N 78°37′47″W
  - elevation: 308 m (1,010 ft)

Basin features
- River system: Great Lakes Basin
- Tributaries
  - left: Harburn Creek
  - right: Eyre Creek (Ontario)

The Redstone River is a river in the municipality of Dysart et al, Haliburton County in central Ontario, Canada that flows from southern Algonquin Provincial Park to the Gull River.

== Course ==
The river begins at Upper Redstone Lake in southern Algonquin Provincial Park. It flows southwest through the Haliburton Forest to Eyre Lake where it takes in the right tributary Eyre Creek, then through Little Redstone Lake to Redstone Lake where it takes in the left tributary Harburn Creek. The waters of the lake exit through two outflows. At the southeast, the East Redstone Dam controls the outflow to and is the source of the East Redstone River, which flows downstream over the East Redstone River Dam to Eagle lake on the Gull River. At the southwest, the West Redstone Dam controls the outflow to the Redstone River, which flows west then southwest to its mouth at Green Lake also on the Gull River but further downstream, west of the community of West Guilford and just north of Ontario Highway 118. The Gull River flows as part of the Trent–Severn Waterway via the Trent River to Lake Ontario. Since the Gull River system flows to the summit of the waterway at Balsam Lake, its tributaries including Redstone River serve as an important water flow control reservoir.

== Tributaries ==
- Harburn Creek (left)
- Eyre Creek (right)

== See also ==
- List of rivers of Ontario
