= Head Lake (Haliburton County) =

Lake in Haliburton County, Ontario, Canada

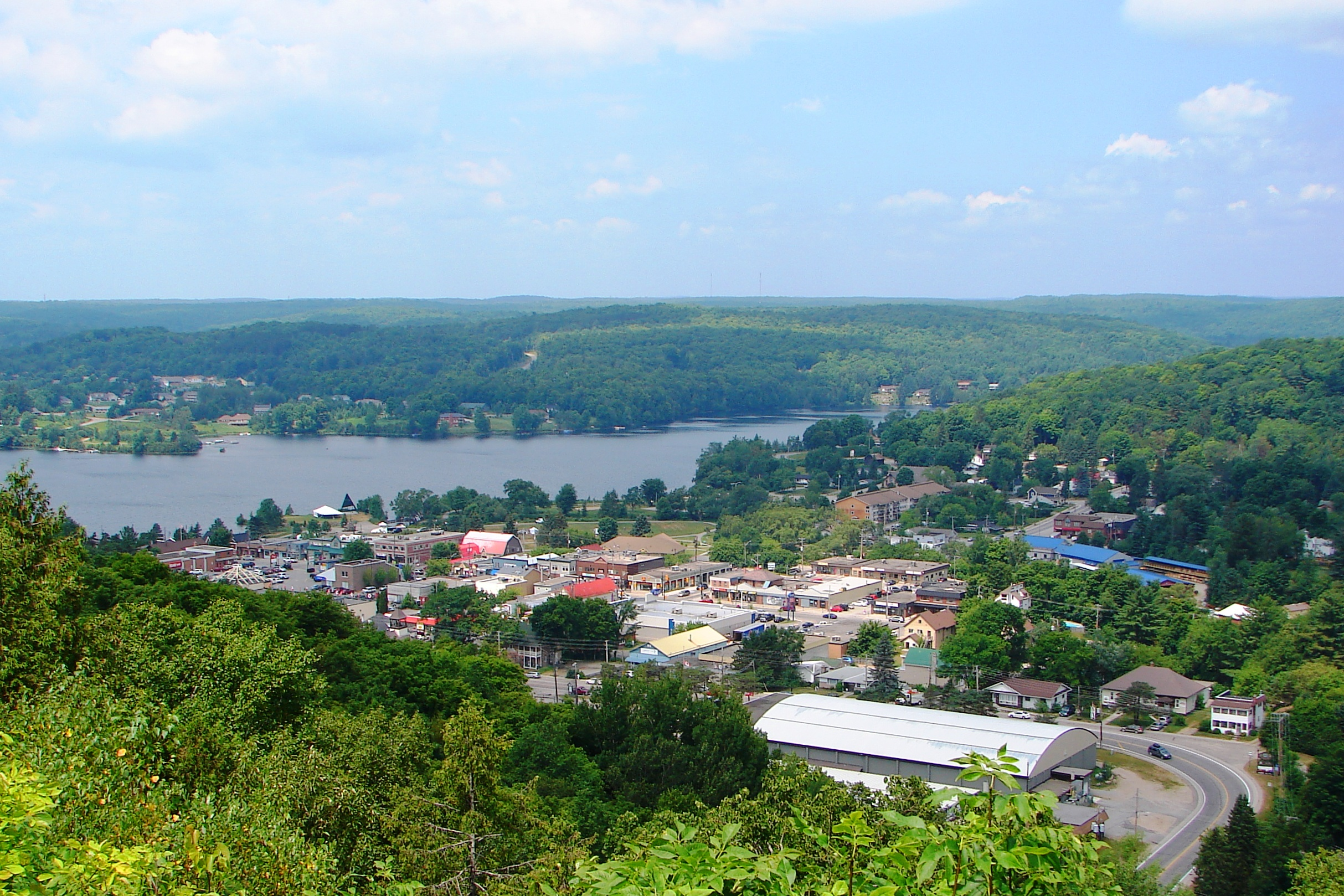
- Head Lake and the village of Haliburton

- Location within Ontario
- Location: Haliburton, Haliburton County, Ontario
- Coordinates: 45°02′55″N 78°30′58″W
- Primary inflows: Drag River
- Primary outflows: Drag River
- Basin countries: Canada
- Max. length: 1.3 km (0.81 mi)
- Max. width: 0.9 km (0.56 mi)
- Surface elevation: 317 m (1,040 ft)

Head Lake is a lake in the village of Haliburton, in Haliburton County, Ontario, Canada. Haliburton Village is in south central Ontario, about 25 km (15 mi) east of the village of Minden and approximately 50 km (31 mi) south-west of the panhandle of Algonquin Park. From Ontario's largest city, Toronto, it is just over 200 km (124 mi) to Haliburton, and from the national capital of Ottawa, it is about 300 km (186 mi).

Head Lake is in the Great Lakes Basin. The primary inflow and outflow is the Drag River, arriving at the east from Drag Lake and leaving at the southwest to Grass Lake. The Drag River then flows via the Burnt River and Trent River to Lake Ontario.

Ontario Highway 118 follows the east shore of the lake.

== See also ==
- List of lakes in Ontario
