= Gaden MacKenzie =

Anglican priest (born 1837)

Gaden Crawford MacKenzie (22 January 1837 - 20 March 1920) was an Anglican priest, most notably Archdeacon of Perth, ON from 1905 to 1920.

MacKenzie was educated at Trinity College, Toronto and ordained in 1870. He served at Haliburton, Galt, Chatham, Kincardine and Grace Church, Brantford.
