= Shadow Lake (Kawartha Lakes) =

Lake in southern Ontario, Canada

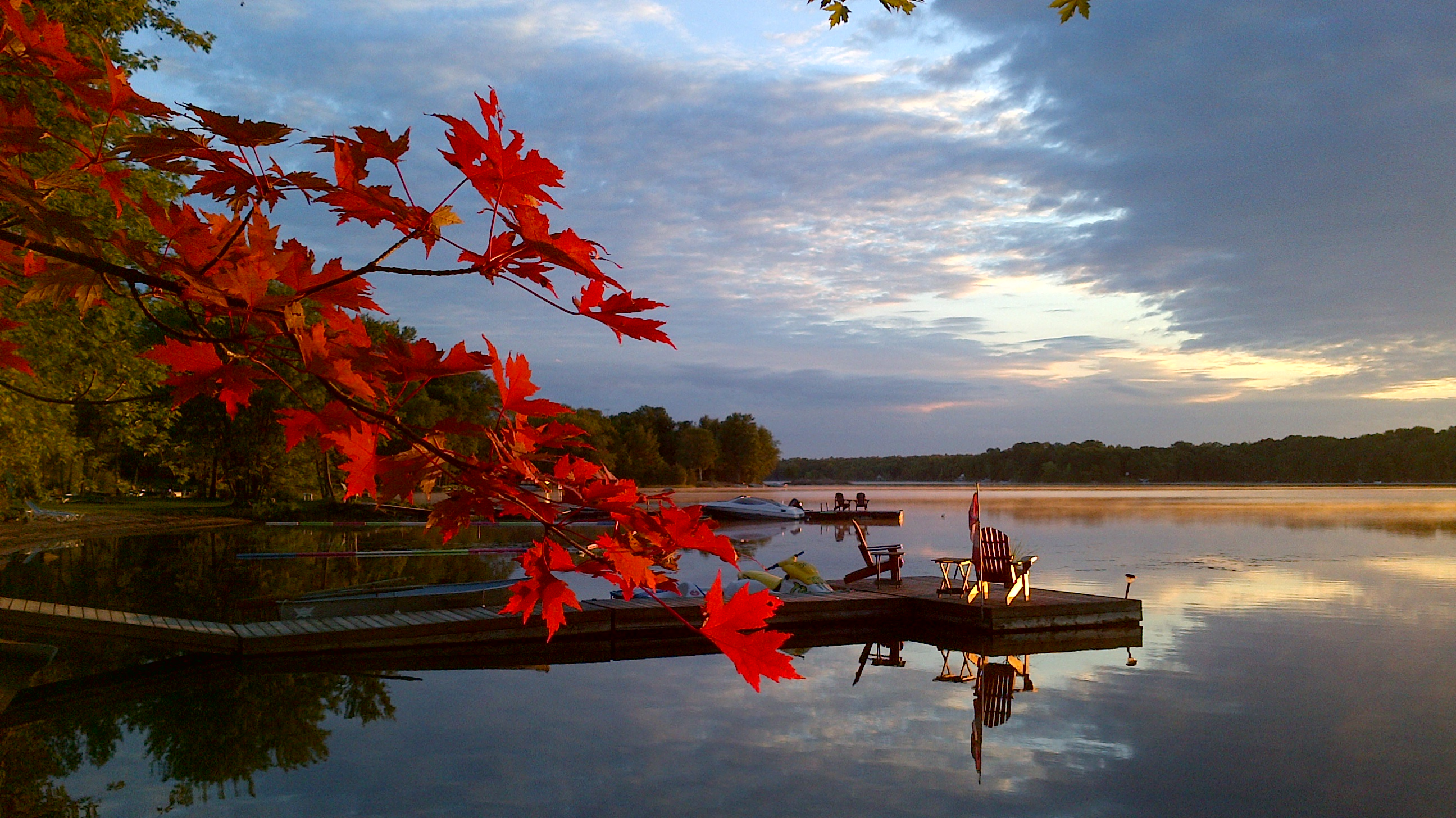

- Location in Southern Ontario
- Location: Kawartha Lakes, Ontario
- Group: Kawartha Lakes
- Coordinates: 44°43′10″N 78°47′37″W
- Type: lake
- Part of: Lake Ontario drainage basin
- Primary inflows: Gull River
- Primary outflows: Gull River
- Basin countries: Canada
- Surface area: 356.8 hectares (882 acres)
- Max. depth: 22 metres (72 ft)
- Residence time: 15 days
- Surface elevation: 259 metres (850 ft)

Shadow Lake is a lake in the city of Kawartha Lakes in Central Ontario, Canada. With an area of 356.8 hectares (882 acres) and an elevation of 259 metres (850 ft), it is the second lake upstream of the mouth of the Gull River, and is in the Lake Ontario drainage basin.

== Geography ==
Shadow Lake has an area of 356.8 hectares (882 acres) and lies at an elevation of 259 metres (850 ft). The maximum depth of the lake is 22 metres (72 ft).

The primary inflow is the Gull River, at the northwest and arriving from the community of Norland, which accounts for 98% of the 786-million-cubic-metre (27.8×10^{9} cu ft) inflow into the lake. There are three unnamed secondary inflows. The primary outflow, at the south, is also the Gull River, which flows south through two rapids, known locally as "the chute", to Silver Lake. It continues to the mouth of the Gull River at Balsam Lake, and then via the main Kawartha Lakes chain, the Otonabee River and the Trent River to the Bay of Quinte on Lake Ontario.

== Recreation ==
Boating is possible upstream to a dam at Norland; and downstream through Silver Lake to a dam at the community of Coboconk, though low and high water flow situations can make the latter passage hazardous.

== See also ==
- List of lakes in Ontario
