= Haliburton Lake =

- Location of the lake in Southern Ontario
- Location: Haliburton County, Ontario
- Coordinates: 45°11′34″N 78°23′46″W
- Type: lake
- Part of: Great Lakes Basin
- Primary inflows: Gull River
- Primary outflows: Gull River (channel to Oblong lake)
- Basin countries: Canada
- Surface area: 1,031 hectares (2,550 acres)
- Surface elevation: 360 metres (1,180 ft)

Haliburton Lake is a lake in the municipality of Dysart et al, Haliburton County in Central Ontario, Canada It is situated west of the southern portion of Algonquin Park, between Percy Lake to the east, and Redstone Lake to the west. The lake lies at an elevation of 360 metres (1,180 ft), has an area of 1,031 hectares (2,550 acres), and is in the Great Lakes Basin.

The primary inflow at the east and arriving from Percy Lake is the Gull River. The Gull River is also the primary outflow, at the southwest and next to the community of Fort Irwin, via an unnamed channel to Oblong Lake.

The shores of the lake are inhabited by some permanent residents, along with a few lake legends such as Chancellor Ron Noad, Cody Hodgeson, Curtis Ball, Tyler Anderson and Aidan Wilkins. Though occupied primarily by seasonal cottagers, some of whom are members of the Haliburton Lake Cottagers Association (HLCA).

== See also ==
- List of lakes in Ontario
