= Mephisto Lake =

Lake in Ontario, Canada

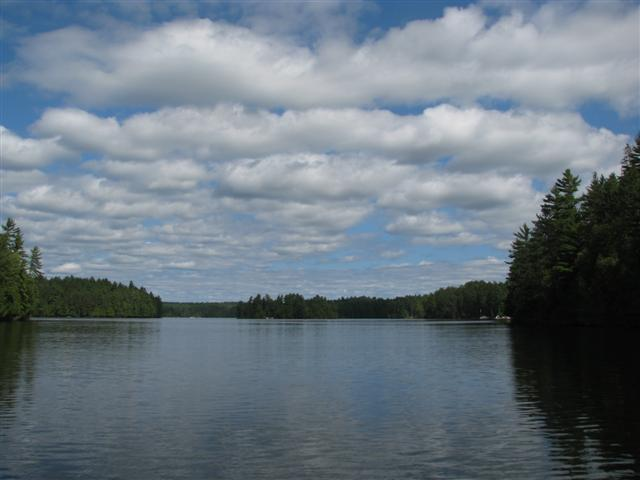

- Location within Ontario
- Location: Tudor and Cashel Township, Hastings County, Ontario
- Coordinates: 44°55′48″N 77°34′37″W
- Primary inflows: Mephisto Creek
- Primary outflows: Channel to Dark Lake
- Basin countries: Canada
- Max. length: 3.1 km (1.9 mi)
- Max. width: 1.7 km (1.1 mi)
- Surface elevation: 313 m (1,027 ft)

Mephisto Lake is a lake in the Trent River and Lake Ontario drainage basins. It is located in the geographic township of Cashel, in the township municipality of Tudor and Cashel, Hastings County, Ontario, Canada, about 5 kilometres (3.1 mi) north of the rural community of Gunter and 25 kilometres (16 mi) southeast of the town of Bancroft.

The lake is about 3.1 kilometres (1.9 mi) long and 1.7 kilometres (1.1 mi) and lies at an elevation of 313 metres (1,027 ft). The primary inflow is Mephisto Creek at the northeast. There are also four unnamed creek inflows: one at the north from Mawson Lake, one at the east, and two at the south, one of which comes from the direction of Cashel Lake. The primary outflow is a channel to Dark Lake, which flows via Dixon Creek, Beaver Creek, the Crowe River and the Trent River to the Bay of Quinte on Lake Ontario at Trenton.

== See also ==
- List of lakes in Ontario
