= Irondale River =

- Location of the mouth of the Irondale River in southern Ontario

Location
- Country: Canada
- Province: Ontario
- Region: Central Ontario
- County: Haliburton
- Municipalities: Minden Hills; Dysart et al

Physical characteristics
- Source: Unnamed lake
  - location: Dysart et al
  - coordinates: 45°08′46″N 78°17′17″W
  - elevation: 472 m (1,549 ft)
- Mouth: Burnt River
  - location: Minden Hills
  - coordinates: 44°48′54″N 78°38′03″W
  - elevation: 285 m (935 ft)

Basin features
- River system: Great Lakes Basin

The Irondale River is a river in Haliburton County in Central Ontario, Canada. It is part of the Great Lakes Basin, and is a left tributary of the Burnt River.

The river flows begins at an unnamed lake in geographic Dudley Township in the municipality of Dysart et al, just southwest of the southern tip of Algonquin Provincial Park. It flows south, passes under Ontario Highway 118, then turns southwest, and passes over the High Falls. It continues southwest, passes into the municipality of Minden Hills, heads past the community of Irondale, and reaches its mouth at the Burnt River, northeast of the community of Kinmount. The Burnt River flows via the Kawartha Lakes, the Otonabee River and the Trent River to Lake Ontario.

From east of the community of Gooderham to the river mouth, the river is paralleled by Haliburton County Road 503.

== Tributaries ==
- Salerno Creek (left)
- Bark Creek (right)
- Gooderham Creek (right)
- McCue Creek (right)
- Laronde Creek (left)
- Hadlington Creek (left)
- Tory Creek (right)
- Esson Creek (right)
- Buckskin Creek (left)
- Cope Creek (left)
- Cardiff Creek (left)

== See also ==
- List of Ontario rivers

== Sources ==
- Map 5 (PDF) (Map). 1 : 700,000. Official road map of Ontario. Ministry of Transportation of Ontario. 2014.
- Restructured municipalities - Ontario map #5 (Map). Restructuring Maps of Ontario. Ontario Ministry of Municipal Affairs and Housing. 2006. Archived from the original on 2020-05-11.
