= Drag River =

- Location of the mouth of the river in southern Ontario

Location
- Country: Canada
- Province: Ontario
- Region: Southern Ontario
- County: Haliburton
- Municipalities: Minden Hills; Dysart et al

Physical characteristics
- Source: Unnamed lake
  - location: Dysart et al
  - coordinates: 45°05′10″N 78°20′18″W
  - elevation: 389 m (1,276 ft)
- Mouth: Burnt River
  - location: Minden Hills
  - coordinates: 44°53′21″N 78°37′00″W
  - elevation: 299 m (981 ft)

Basin features
- River system: Great Lakes Basin

The Drag River is a river in the municipalities of Minden Hills and Dysart et al in Haliburton County, Southern Ontario, Canada. It is in the Great Lakes Basin and is a right tributary of the Burnt River.

== Course ==
The river begins at an unnamed lake, and flows west through Drag Lake, Head Lake and Grass Lake, then heads south through Kashagawigamog Lake to reach its mouth at the Burnt River, about 1 kilometre (0.6 mi) south of the community of Gelert. The Burnt River flows Kawartha Lakes and the Trent River to Lake Ontario.

== See also ==
- List of rivers of Ontario

== Sources ==
- Map 5 (PDF) (Map). 1 : 700,000. Official road map of Ontario. Ministry of Transportation of Ontario. 2010-01-01.
- Restructured municipalities - Ontario map #5 (Map). Restructuring Maps of Ontario. Ontario Ministry of Municipal Affairs and Housing. 2006. Archived from the original on 2020-05-11.
