= The Murray Marsh =

Marsh in Southeastern Ontario, Canada

Coordinates: 44.2379°N 77.7204°W

The Murray Marsh, also known as the Big Murray Swamp, is an ecologically important wetland on the Trent River in Northumberland County, Ontario, Canada. At 4850 hectares (12,125 acres), this is the largest expanse of unspoiled wetland in southeastern Ontario.

Lying south of Percy Reach, the marsh extends 8.75 kilometres southward from the Reach to a point 3.3 kilometres northwest of Wooler, Ontario. It sweeps in an irregular arc between Percy Boom (44 degs, 14 mins North; 77 degs, 48 mins West) in the west and German's Landing (44 degs, 16 mins, North; 77 degs, 40 mins West) in the east. These two points are located approximately 10.8 kilometres apart.

Vegetation consists of wooded swamp, thicket swamp and lowland deciduous forest interrupted by ridges, islands and open water. More than 150 bird species including migrating waterfowl use the marsh as a feeding and nesting site. A heronry is located in a meadowland in the northwest area of the marsh and a large deer yard is situated in the wetland.
