= Redstone Lake (Haliburton County) =

- Location of Redstone Lake in southern Ontario
- Location: Dysart et al, Ontario, Canada
- Coordinates: 45°10′59″N 78°32′16″W
- Type: Lake
- Part of: Great Lakes Basin
- River sources: Redstone River
- Max. length: 6.5 km (4.0 mi)
- Max. width: 4.8 km (3.0 mi)
- Surface elevation: 365 m (1,198 ft)

Redstone Lake is a lake located in geographic Guilford Township in the Municipality of Dysart et al, Haliburton County in Central Ontario, Canada. It is in the Great Lakes Basin and is part of the Gull River system. At its longest, it is approximately 6.5km (4 miles).

== Hydrology ==
The primary inflow is the Redstone River at arriving via two channels at the northwest from Pelaw Lake and from Little Redstone Lake. A secondary inflow is Harburn Creek at the northeast. There are two primary outflows that are both controlled by dams and that both lead to the Gull River. The East Redstone River at the southeast leads to Eagle Lake further downstream, and the Redstone River at the southwest leads to Green Lake further downstream. The Gull River flows as part of the Trent–Severn Waterway via the Trent River to Lake Ontario. Since the Gull River system flows to the summit of the waterway at Balsam Lake, its tributaries including Redstone Lake serve as an important water flow control reservoir.

== Economy ==
Residents of Bitter, Burdock, Little Redstone, Pelaw and Redstone Lakes are represented by the Redstone Lake Cottagers Association.

The West Guilford/Redstone Lake Water Aerodrome is located at the northwest end of the lake.

== See also ==
- List of lakes in Ontario
