= Kimber Lake =

Lake in Ontario, Canada

Coordinates: 49.840141°N 93.594332°W

Kimber Lake is a very small lake in the Kenora District of Ontario, Canada. It has one short stream leading out of it, into a smaller lake called Skull Lake.

== See also ==
- List of lakes in Ontario
