= Kawagama Lake =

Lake in Ontario, Canada

Kawagama Lake Hollow Lake
- Location in southern Ontario
- Location: Ontario
- Coordinates: 45°17′55″N 78°45′09″W
- Primary inflows: various creeks and streams
- Primary outflows: Hollow River
- Catchment area: Northwestern Haliburton
- Basin countries: Canada
- Surface area: 32 km^{2} (12 sq mi)
- Average depth: 21 m (69 ft)
- Max. depth: 67 m (220 ft)
- Water volume: 498,646 acre⋅ft (615,071,000 m^{3})
- Shore length^{1}: 83.5 km (51.9 mi)
- Surface elevation: 355.6 m (1,167 ft)
- Islands: 10 (inhabited)
- Settlements: none
- ^{1} Shore length is not a well-defined measure.

Kawagama Lake is located on the northwestern border of Haliburton and Muskoka counties in Central Ontario, Canada.

== Description ==
Kawagama lake is the largest lake in Haliburton county, it does not have any towns or settlements on it. From the northwestern bay (Fletcher Bay) to its southeastern tip (the Hollow River) it is over 16 kilometres (10 mi) in length. In its central area, it is 2.5 kilometres (2 mi). It has two marinas ( Mountain Trout House and Old Mill Marina) and two access points. The word "kawagama" is Native for "hollow". At the northeast end of Kawagama Lake it connects to Bear Lake.

The main area of the lake has eight inhabited islands, one housing a camp called Moorelands camp for underprivileged children from the Greater Toronto Area.

The maximum depth of the lake is 67 metres (220 ft) with an average depth of 21 metres (69 ft). The shoreline is approximately 83 kilometres (52 mi) long. The Ministry of Natural Resources controls the lake level.

Fourteen creeks and small rivers feed Kawagama Lake, the two main ones are the short Bear River and the Hollow River. The Hollow River flows into the Lake of Bays.

== Wild life ==
Kawagama lake is home to water birds such as loons and ducks, mammals such as black bears, moose, deer, wolves, foxes, otters, beavers, and raccoons and fish such as lake trout and bass. It is also home to frogs, turtles, and several species of snakes.

== Location ==
The communities of Dorset, Dwight and Baysville are the closest settlements, while the largest major settlement is Huntsville.

== See also ==
- List of lakes in Ontario
