= Algonquin Highlands =

- Township (lower-tier)
- Township of Algonquin Highlands
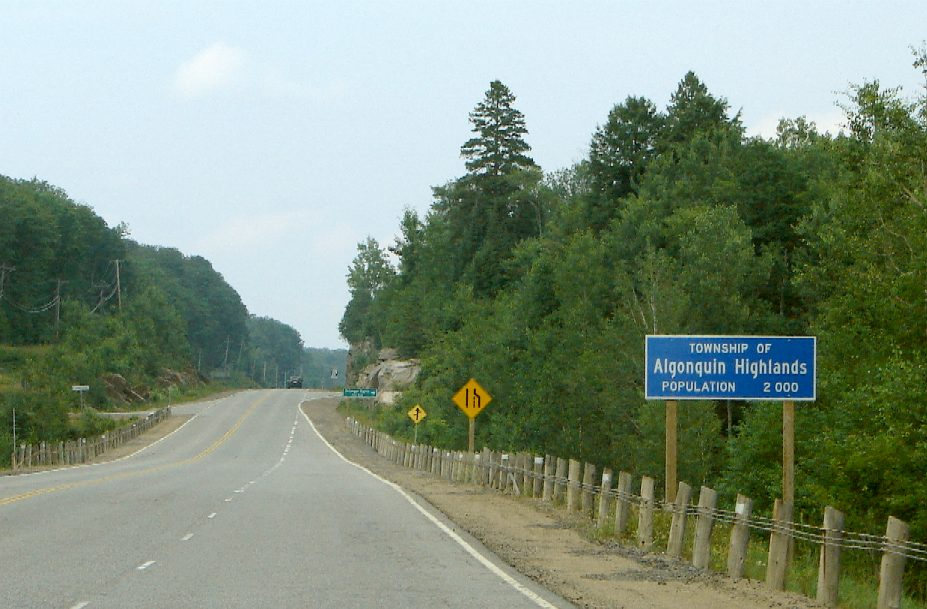

- Logo

- Location within Haliburton County Location within Southern Ontario
- Coordinates: 45°24′N 78°45′W
- Country: Canada
- Province: Ontario
- County: Haliburton
- Incorporated: January 1, 2001

Government
  - Type: Township
  - Mayor: Liz Danielsen
  - Fed. riding: Haliburton—Kawartha Lakes
  - Prov. riding: Haliburton—Kawartha Lakes—Brock

Area
  - Land: 999.69 km^{2} (385.98 sq mi)
- Elevation: 443 m (1,453 ft)

Population (2021)
  - Total: 2,588
  - Density: 2.6/km^{2} (6.7/sq mi)
- Time zone: UTC-5 (EST)
  - Summer (DST): UTC-4 (EDT)
- Postal code: K0M 1S0
- Area code: 705
- Website: www.algonquinhighlands.ca

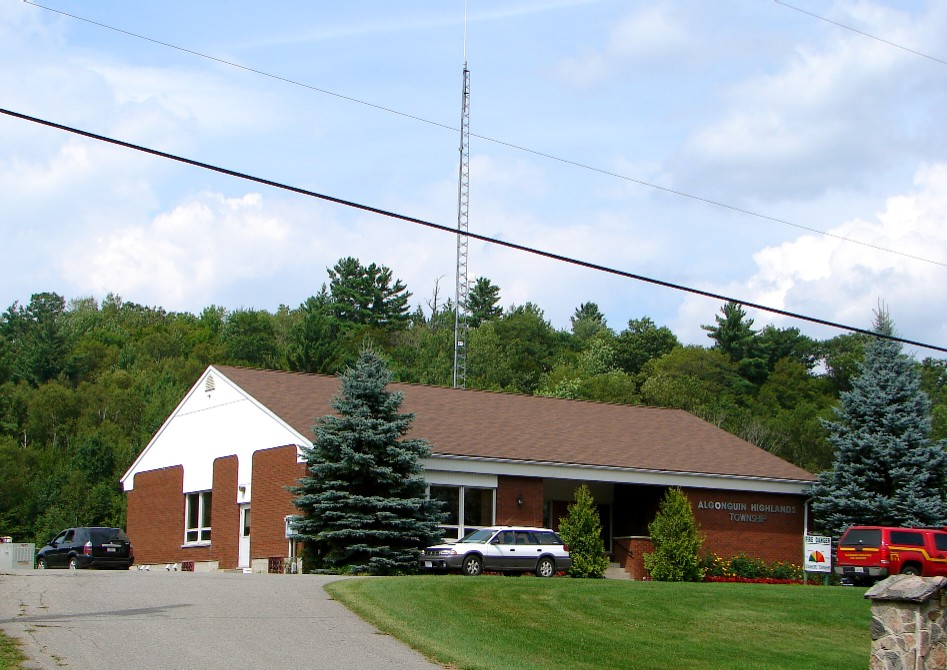
Municipal office near Carnarvon

Algonquin Highlands is a township located in Haliburton County, Ontario, Canada. It has a population of 2,351. The northeastern section of the township is included in Algonquin Provincial Park.

The township was formed on January 1, 2001, through the amalgamation of Stanhope and Sherborne et al. townships, the latter of which included McClintock, Livingstone, Lawrence and Nightingale. It was thereafter briefly known as the Township of Sherborne, Stanhope, McClintock, Livingstone, Lawrence and Nightingale until it was renamed to its current name in March 2001.

The township lacks a commercial centre, but its municipal offices are located on North Shore Road, 5 kilometres (3.1 mi) north of Carnarvon at 45°05′09″N 78°41′36″W. A satellite municipal office is located in Dorset, the main street of which straddles the border of Algonquin Highlands to the east and Lake of Bays to the west.

== Communities ==
The largest community in the Municipality of Algonquin Highlands is Dorset, Ontario although this community is actually split with Lake of Bays, Ontario.

== Geography ==
Located in Algonquin Provincial Park, the area is characterized by uplands and dense transitional forestation. It rests on a portion of the Canadian Shield.

=== Climate ===
Algonquin Highlands experiences a humid continental climate, with it being more cool due to the higher elevation.

== Wildlife ==
The Algonquin Highlands support a wide range of wildlife due to their unique position at the transition zone between northern coniferous and southern deciduous forests. More than 50 species of mammals have been documented in the region.

Large mammals commonly seen include moose, with a population of approximately 3,500, white-tailed deer, and black bears, which number around 2,000 and are typically shy and non-aggressive toward humans. Beavers are widespread and play a significant ecological role in wetland maintenance, often observed from trails like Beaver Pond and Mizzy Lake.

The area also provides habitat for the eastern wolf, a threatened species found in several packs within the region. Smaller mammals such as otters, pine martens, red squirrels, chipmunks, raccoons, and foxes are also regularly seen, particularly in less-traveled areas.

Beyond mammals, Algonquin Highlands are home to more than 270 bird species and over 30 species of reptiles and amphibians, reinforcing the area’s reputation as a premier location for wildlife observation in Ontario.

== Demographics ==
In the 2021 Census of Population conducted by Statistics Canada, Algonquin Highlands had a population of 2,588 living in 1,269 of its 3,325 total private dwellings, a change of 10.1% from its 2016 population of 2,351. With a land area of 999.69 km^{2} (385.98 sq mi), it had a population density of 2.6/km^{2} (6.7/sq mi) in 2021.

Canada census – Algonquin Highlands community profile

	2021	2016	2011
Population	2,588 (+10.1% from 2016)	2,351 (+7.5% from 2011)	2,186 (+9.1% from 2006)
Land area	999.69 km^{2} (385.98 sq mi)	1,007.2 km^{2} (388.9 sq mi)	1,004.76 km^{2} (387.94 sq mi)
Population density	2.6/km^{2} (6.7/sq mi)	2.3/km^{2} (6.0/sq mi)	2.1/km^{2} (5.4/sq mi)
Median age	60.4 (M: 60.4, F: 61.2)	59.0 (M: 58.8, F: 59.2)
Private dwellings	3,325 (total) 1,269 (occupied)	3,453 (total)	3,878 (total)
Median household income	$77,000	$60,877

References: 2021 2016 2011

Historical census populations – Hastings Highlands
Year	Pop.	±%
1996	1,687	—
2001	1,827	+8.3%
2006	1,976	+8.2%
2011	2,186	+10.6%
2016	2,351	+7.5%
2021	2,588	+10.1%
Source: Statistics Canada

Mother tongue (2021):

- English as first language: 93.1%
- French as first language: 0.8%
- English and French as first language: 0.2%
- Other as first language: 5.0%

== See also ==
- List of municipalities in Ontario
- List of townships in Ontario
