= Drag Lake =

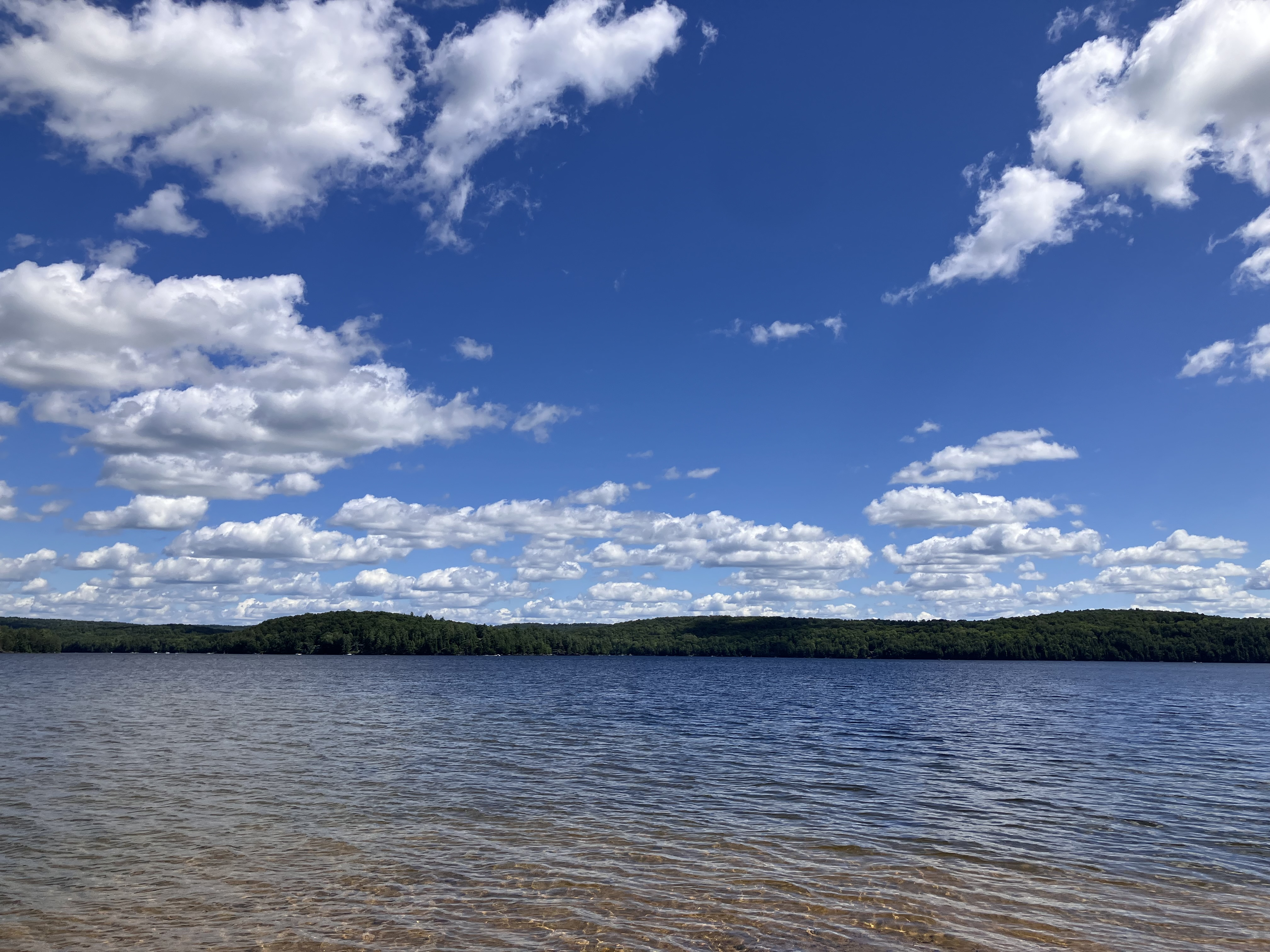

- Location within Ontario
- Location: Haliburton County, Ontario
- Coordinates: 45°04′10″N 78°24′22″W
- Lake type: Glacial lake
- Primary inflows: Drag River
- Primary outflows: Drag River
- Basin countries: Canada
- Surface area: 1,003 hectares (2,478 acres)
- Max. depth: 55 m (180 ft)
- Surface elevation: 354 m (1,161 ft)
- Frozen: Mid-December to Late April
- Islands: (None on lake)
- Settlements: (None on lake)

Drag Lake is a glacial lake in the township of Dysart et al in Haliburton County, Southern Ontario, Canada.

The lake is in Great Lakes Basin, and its primary inflow, at the east, and outflow, at the west and controlled by a dam, is the Drag River.

Residents of Drag Lake are represented by the Drag and Spruce Lake Property Owners Association.

== See also ==
- List of lakes in Ontario
