= Burnt River (Ontario) =

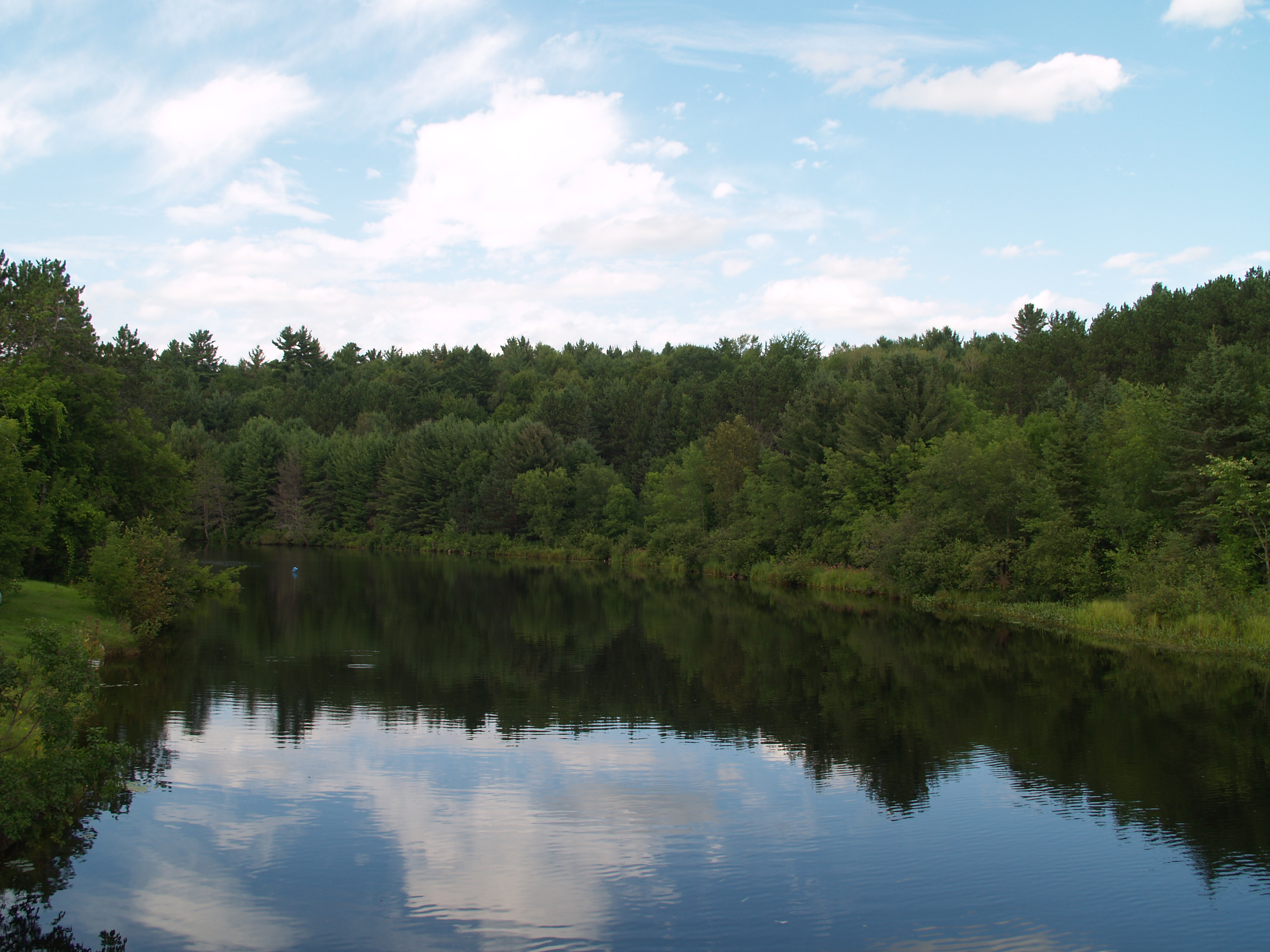
- The Burnt River within Kinmount

- Location of the mouth of the Burnt River in southern Ontario

Location
- Country: Canada
- Province: Ontario
- Region: Central Ontario

Physical characteristics
- Source: Miskwabi Lake
  - location: Highlands East, Haliburton County
  - coordinates: 45°02′29″N 78°22′33″W
  - elevation: 392 m (1,286 ft)
- Mouth: Cameron Lake
  - location: City of Kawartha Lakes
  - coordinates: 44°34′52″N 78°45′55″W
  - elevation: 253 m (830 ft)

The Burnt River is a river which flows from its source at Miskwabi Lake in Highlands East, Haliburton County south into the Kawartha Lakes region. It empties into Cameron Lake in the city of Kawartha Lakes, part of the Trent–Severn Waterway. The town of Burnt River is located near its southern end.

The river was used to transport lumber to sawmills downstream. Later, the Victoria Railway was built along the river. The old railway bed is now a recreational trail.

The river was given its name after a forest fire in the region left the river's water with an unusual colour.

== Fish species ==
There are three major species of fish in the river including walleye, muskie and smallmouth bass. All three tend to grow smaller than those in the nearby lakes, however they may be legally caught according to local regulations. As well as conventional fishing techniques, the smallmouth bass may be caught while fly fishing.

== Tributaries ==
- Drag River
- Irondale River

== See also ==
- List of rivers of Ontario

== Sources ==
- "Burnt River". Geographical Names Data Base. Natural Resources Canada.
- "Topographic Map sheets 31D10, 31D15, 31E1, 31E2". Atlas of Canada. Natural Resources Canada. 2010-02-04. Archived from the original on 2010-08-03.
