= Gull River (Balsam Lake) =

River in Haliburton County, Ontario, Canada

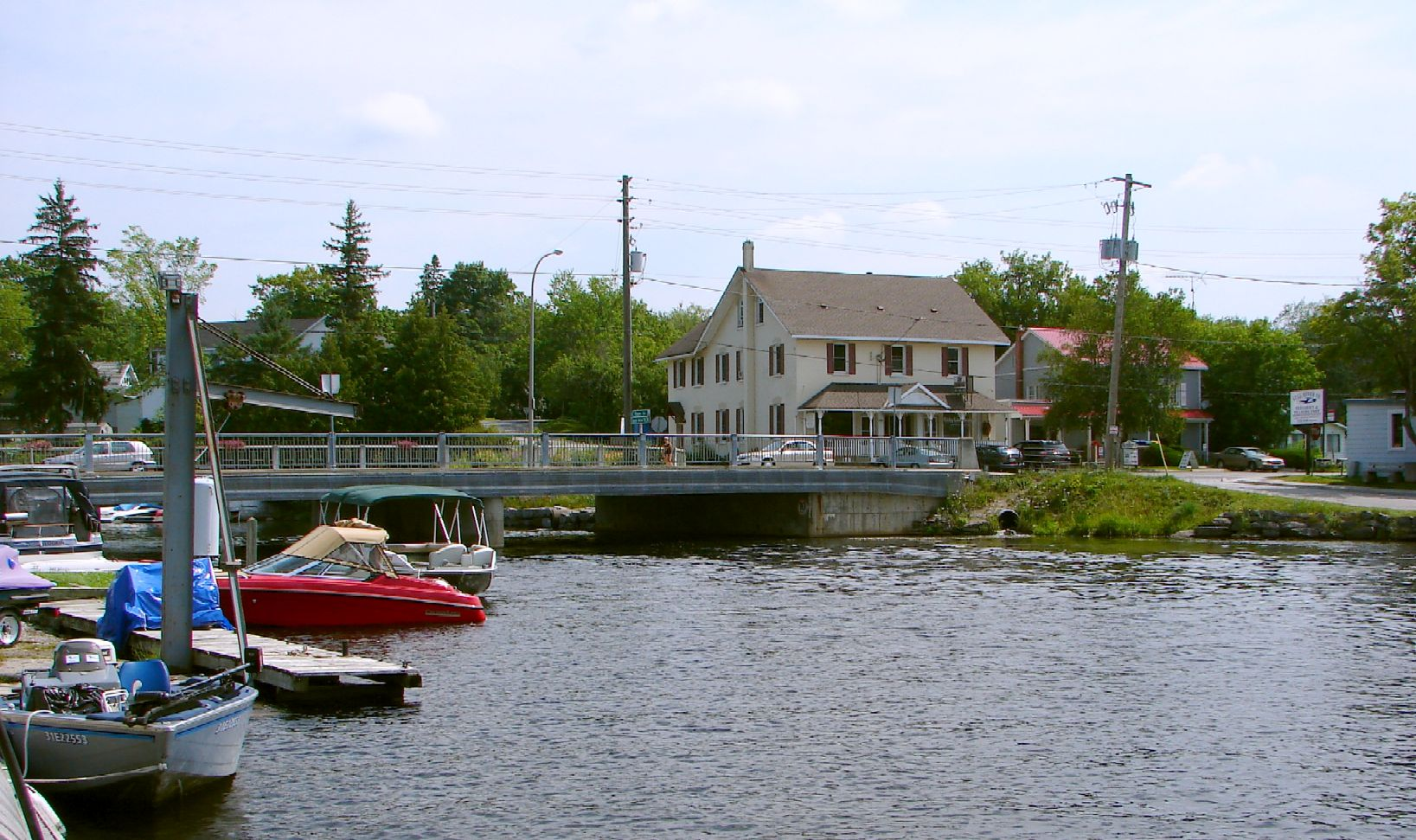
- Gull River at Coboconk

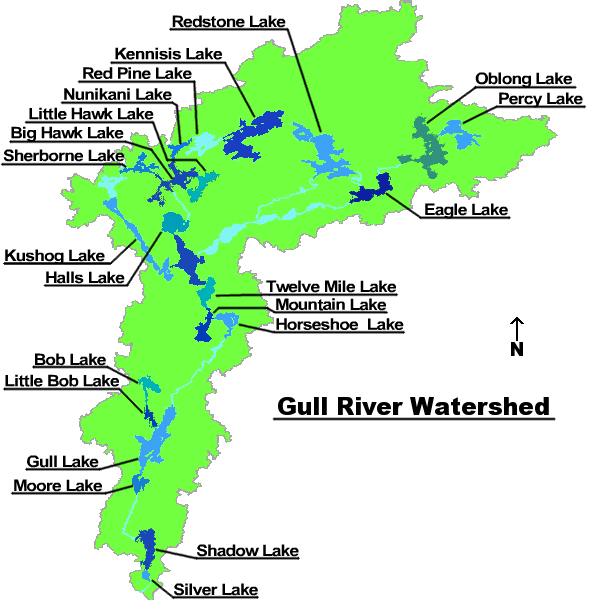
- The Gull River drainage basin

- Location of the mouth of the Gull River in southern Ontario.

Location
- Country: Canada
- Province: Ontario
- County: Haliburton
- Municipalities: Algonquin Highlands; Dysart et al; Kawartha Lakes

Physical characteristics
- Source: Longboot Lake
  - location: Southern Algonquin Provincial Park in Dysart et al, Haliburton County
  - coordinates: 45°13′16″N 78°16′00″W
  - elevation: 457 m (1,499 ft)
- Mouth: Balsam Lake
  - location: Coboconk, Kawartha Lakes
  - coordinates: 44°38′28″N 78°48′19″W
  - elevation: 256.3 m (841 ft)
- Discharge
  - average: 20 m^{3}/s (710 cu ft/s)
  - minimum: 12 m^{3}/s (420 cu ft/s)
  - maximum: 27 m^{3}/s (950 cu ft/s)

Basin features
- River system: Great Lakes Basin
- Tributaries
  - right: Boshkung River, Kennisis River, Redstone River

The Gull River is a river in Algonquin Highlands and Dysart et al, Haliburton County and the single-tier municipality of Kawartha Lakes in south-central Ontario, Canada. It is in the Trent River and Lake Ontario drainage basins, and flows from southern Algonquin Provincial Park to Balsam Lake on the Trent–Severn Waterway.

== Etymology ==
While there are no sources as to the naming of the Gull river, one of the possible origins is a translation of the name of the village of Coboconk. The name is translated from the Indigenous (Likely Ojibwa) term, Quash-qua-be-conk, meaning "where the gulls nest." The town of Minden, about 30 kilometres (19 mi) north, was named Gull River prior to April 1, 1859.

== Course ==
The Gull River begins at Longboot Lake in the geographic township of Bruton in Dysart et al., Haliburton County. This is in the southern arm of Algonquin Provincial Park, and just south of the York River in the Ottawa River drainage basin. The river leaves the lake at the southeast and loops east, south, west and north west to Percy Lake.

== History ==
The Gull River drainage basin is an important reservoir for the Trent–Severn Waterway. The lakes of the system were flooded during the 1800s by man-made cofferdams in order to preserve the flow of the river throughout the year. While the original purpose of this was to aid lumberjacks — who were cutting pine, spruce and hemlock in the area — in sending logs downstream to Trenton after the initial spring flooding had subsided, it would serve a dual purpose when the lock between Balsam Lake and Cameron Lake was completed in 1873, connecting Trenton with Coboconk. Balsam lake was raised 5 metres to provide enough depth for steamboats passing through the lock.

Since that time, the Gull River has been an integral part of the Trent-Severn Waterway. The water levels of the lakes in the drainage basin are closely monitored in order to preserve the reservoir year-round, as well as to protect the cottage lands adjacent to the lakes. Lake levels generally swell during the spring thaw and late fall, and settle back to normal by mid-June. The lowest water levels are in late winter.

Most of the lake front property on the lower sections of the Gull River system was divided into deep narrow lots in the 1830s, unlike the regular-sized concessions in the adjacent land. These properties would in time develop into the many cottages that dot the lakes today.

== Geology ==
The river's lowest and southernmost lake, Silver Lake, lies upon the boundary line between the granite Canadian Shield, and the Limestone sheaths which lie south of it. The lakes and rivers north of Silver Lake twist and wind between the mountains and valleys created by the retreating glaciers at the end of the ice age. The result is the wilderness that has earned Highway 35, which passes through the drainage basin, a reputation as one of the most scenic highways of Ontario.

== Recreation ==
An artificial white water course was constructed through Minden and has earned the river a reputation amongst enthusiasts and kayakers.

== Tributaries ==
- Boshkung River (right)
- Kennisis River (right)
- Redstone River

== See also ==
- List of rivers of Ontario

== Sources ==
- "Gull River". Geographical Names Data Base. Natural Resources Canada.
- "Topographic Map sheets 31D10, 31D15, 31E1, 31E2". Atlas of Canada. Natural Resources Canada. 2010-02-04.
