= Haliburton County =

- County (upper-tier)
- County of Haliburton
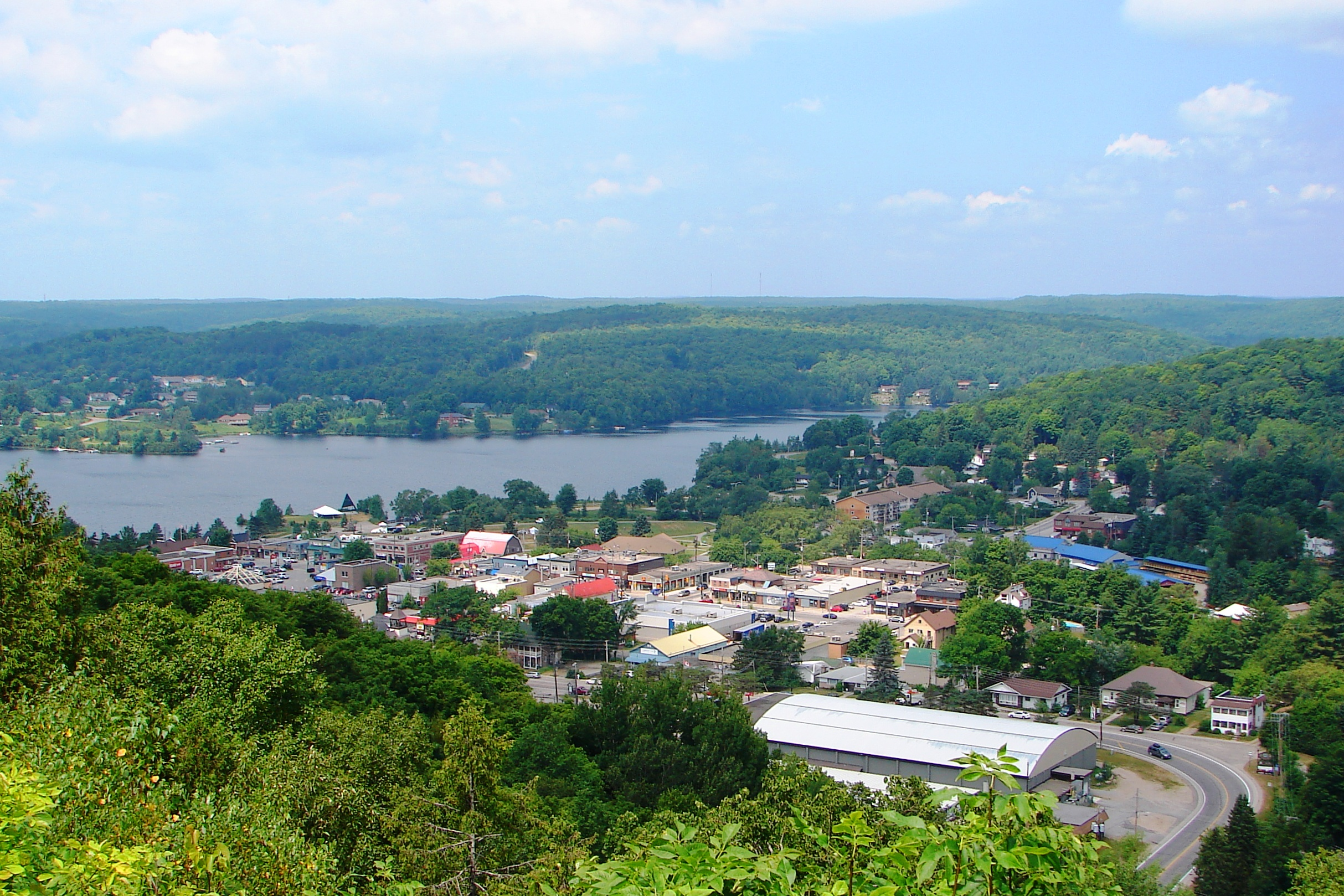

- Logo Coat of arms
- Motto: Watch Weel

- Haliburton County's location in relation to Ontario
- Coordinates: 45°05′N 78°30′W
- Country: Canada
- Province: Ontario
- Region: Central Ontario
- County seat: Minden
- Municipalities: List: Algonquin Highlands; Dysart et al; Highlands East; Minden Hills

Area
  - Land: 4,009.47 km^{2} (1,548.07 sq mi)

Population (2021)
  - Total: 20,571
  - Density: 5.1/km^{2} (13/sq mi)
- Time zone: UTC-5 (EST)
  - Summer (DST): UTC-4 (EDT)
- Area code: 705 / 249
- Website: www.haliburtoncounty.ca

Haliburton is a county of Ontario, Canada, known as a tourist and cottage area in Central Ontario for its scenery and for its resident artists. Minden Hills is the county seat. Haliburton County and the village of Haliburton are named after Thomas Chandler Haliburton, author, statesman, and the first chairman of the Canadian Land and Emigration Company.

The county borders Algonquin Provincial Park on the north.

== History ==
It was originally organized in 1874 as the Provisional County of Haliburton. The county's economy has historically been based on the lumber industry, with the first sawmill officially opening on December 18, 1864. The Canadian Land and Emigration Company later opened in the 1870s and operated until 1892. A third sawmill was constructed in 1903 by the William Laking Lumber Company. All three of these mills were constructed on the Drag River, an important river in the county in the centre of Haliburton Village used to send lumber downstream. The county was created from townships that were withdrawn from other counties and districts, including:

Formation of the Provisional County of Haliburton
Transferred from	Townships
Victoria County	Anson; Hindon; Lutterworth
Peterborough County	Bruton; Cardiff; Dysart; Dudley; Glamorgan; Guilford; Harburn; Harcourt; Minden; Monmouth; Snowden; Stanhope
Nipissing District	Clyde; Eyre; Havelock; Lawrence; Livingstone; McClintock; Nightingale; Sherborne

It became Haliburton County in 1983, and consists of the following municipalities:

- Township of Algonquin Highlands
- Municipality of Dysart et al (Dysart, Bruton, Clyde, Dudley, Eyre, Guilford, Harburn, Harcourt and Havelock)
- Municipality of Highlands East
- Township of Minden Hills

Communities in the county include Haliburton, Dorset, Minden, Wilberforce, Gooderham, Irondale, Cardiff, West Guilford, Eagle Lake and Fort Irwin.

== Geography ==
Haliburton County is dubbed the "Haliburton Highlands". The Haliburton Highlands region is also one of the higher points on the Canadian Shield, ranging from 1,066 feet (325 m) at the Haliburton/Stanhope Municipal Airport to 1,450 feet (440 m) above sea level at Sir Sam's Ski Resort in Eagle Lake.

=== Lakes ===
Haliburton County is spotted with many rivers and lakes, including endorheic lakes fed by natural springs. Some of the major lakes are as follows:

- Beech Lake
- Bitter Lake
- Burdock Lake
- Boshkung Lake
- Canning Lake
- Dark Lake
- Drag Lake
- Farquhar Lake
- Grace Lake
- Grass Lake
- Gull Lake
- Haliburton Lake
- Halls Lake (Ontario)
- Havelock Lake
- Little Hawk Lake
- Big Hawk Lake
- Head Lake
- Horseshoe Lake
- Kashagawigamog Lake
- Kawagama Lake
- Kennisis Lake
- Kushog Lake
- Little Cameron Lake
- Minden Lake
- Mountain Lake
- Paudash Lake
- Raven Lake
- Redstone Lake
- Salerno Lake
- Soyers Lake
- Stormy Lake
- Twelve Mile Lake
- Wenona Lake
- Wilbermere Lake

== Demographics ==
As a census division in the 2021 Census of Population conducted by Statistics Canada, Haliburton County had a population of 20,571 living in 9,714 of its 21,072 total private dwellings, a change of 13.9% from its 2016 population of 18,062. With a land area of 4,009.47 km^{2} (1,548.07 sq mi), it had a population density of 5.1/km^{2} (13.3/sq mi) in 2021.

Canada census – Haliburton community profile

	2021	2016	2011
Population	20,571 (+13.9% from 2016)	18,062 (+5.9% from 2011)	17,026 (+5.4% from 2006)
Land area	4,009.47 km^{2} (1,548.07 sq mi)	4,071.86 km^{2} (1,572.15 sq mi)	4,071.86 km^{2} (1,572.15 sq mi)
Population density	5.1/km^{2} (13/sq mi)	4.4/km^{2} (11/sq mi)	4.2/km^{2} (11/sq mi)
Median age	59.2 (M: 58.8, F: 59.6)	57.5 (M: 57.3, F: 57.7)
Private dwellings	21,072 (total) 9,714 (occupied)	21,113 (total)	21,365 (total)
Median household income	$73,500	$58,125

References: 2021 2016 2011

Historical census populations – Haliburton County

Year	Pop.	±%
1921	6,209	—
1931	5,997	−3.4%
1941	6,695	+11.6%
1951	7,670	+14.6%
1956	8,012	+4.5%
1961	8,928	+11.4%

Year	Pop.	±%
1966	7,768	−13.0%
1971	9,081	+16.9%
1976	10,795	+18.9%
1981	11,361	+5.2%
1986	11,961	+5.3%
1991	14,421	+20.6%

Year	Pop.	±%
1996	15,321	+6.2%
2001	15,085	−1.5%
2006	16,147	+7.0%
2011	17,026	+5.4%
2016	18,062	+6.1%
2021	20,571	+13.9%

Source: Statistics Canada

== Economy ==
Haliburton County's economy is dominated by tourism. The ratio of properties occupied in the summer months, to properties occupied year-round is about 3 to 1. Employment primarily caters to the needs of this seasonal cottage country population, including residential construction, resorts, services and retail. One particularly successful resort at the time was the Wigamog Inn Resort. Years ago it catered to hundreds staying on site during the summer months, and was a prime location being only a minutes walk from the lake. It closed permanently around 2009–2010, with a new owner buying the property in 2016.

The Haliburton County Development Corporation (HCDC) is currently working on a project called Innovative Haliburton to bring attention to the creative economy in Haliburton, as well as, partnering with HCDC to advance the creative economy in eastern Ontario. In 2009, HCDC formed a creative economy committee to look at ways to: encourage innovative people who already have an attachment to the area to move and run their business here, support new and existing businesses in the county that work in the creative economy, showcase local businesses that are successfully engaged in the creative economy, and support our local governments to engage in planning that will help attract new businesses. In 2013, The Creative Economy Committee's name was changed to the Economic Innovations Committee to better describe the roles of the committee as a seed organization, helping the county to prosper through innovation and enabling the youth of the county to better understand the opportunities that are being created in the new economy.

The county is serviced by hospitals in Haliburton and Minden; both are administered by Haliburton Highlands Health Services.

== Transportation ==
Highway 118 runs through the county, passing near the community of Haliburton.

The Victoria Railway (later the CN Haliburton Subdivision) formerly connected the county to the Canadian railway system via nearby Lindsay.

The Haliburton County Rail Trail runs between Haliburton and Kinmount. A rail trail, it follows the right of way of the Victoria Railway. At Kinmount, it connects to the Victoria Rail Trail, which continues on to Lindsay.

== Education ==
Public school education in Haliburton County is managed by the Trillium Lakelands District School Board (TLDSB), which runs the following schools in the county:

Elementary

Minden Hills

- Archie Stouffer Elementary School – Grades K–8

Dysart et al

- Stuart W. Baker Elementary School – French Immersion, Grades K–3
- J. Douglas Hodgson Elementary School – Grades 4–8

Highlands East

- Cardiff Elementary School – Grades K–3
- Wilberforce Elementary School – Grades 4–8

Secondary

- Haliburton Highlands Secondary School – Grades 9–12

The following post-secondary and private schools are also located in the county, but are not managed by the TLDSB:

Post-Secondary

- Fleming College – Haliburton School of Art + Design

Adult Education

- Highlands Adult Education and Training Centre
- Fleming College Academic Upgrading

Private Education

- At Last Forest School

== Arts and culture ==
The Haliburton Highlands is home to a thriving arts community. The county is dotted by galleries, both public and private, offering events, programs, and workshops to the public. Artists’ studios can be found in almost every community, many offering public demonstrations, small galleries, and classes. There are murals and public sculptures in the downtowns of most communities, as well as in park settings. The county is home to the renowned Haliburton Sculpture Forest, a unique outdoor collection of sculptures by Canadian and international artists.

The Highlands are also home to the Haliburton School of The Art + Design of Fleming College. Students come from across Canada, as well as internationally, to immerse themselves in the unique art offerings of the Haliburton Campus. There are art certificates in glassblowing, photo arts, blacksmithing, painting and drawing, digital image design, jewellery essentials, fibre arts, sculpture, ceramics as well as the visual and creative arts diploma. Haliburton also offers over 300 courses in the spring-summer program which attracts nearly 3000 students of all ages to the area during the busy tourism season. Many local artists are involved in the school as part-time faculty. The Haliburton Campus also offers a post-graduate certificate in expressive arts. The campus also has an emphasis on eco-friendly education and offers certificates in sustainable building and construction, and in sustainable renovation. The sustainable building and construction program was the first of its kind in Canada and its success has had a positive impact locally, as the programs have built the R.D. Lawrence Place at the Minden Hills Cultural Centre, the 4Cs Thrift Store in Haliburton, the Kinark Outdoor Centre in Minden and, in the summer of 2013, the new Library in Wilberforce. The renovation program revitalized the Haliburton Highlands Museum.

Heritage is also a focus in the county, with established museums in Carnarvon, Dorset, Haliburton, Minden, and Wilberforce, as well as many fledgling museums emerging in some of the smaller communities. Many buildings throughout the county are designated heritage sites by the province, and many others undergoing preservation through the interests of the public.

The performing arts also receive much attention. Haliburton Highlands Secondary School has historically had strong drama and music programs, showcasing their talents throughout the year to the public. As well, the Highlands Summer Festival presents a wide array of theatre offerings throughout the summer, showcasing the talents of local and seasonally local actors and musicians. Numerous indie bands perform throughout the county, with open mic events being held at a number of establishments.

Haliburton is also home to the Creative Business Incubator. The incubator provides entrepreneurs with a flexible and affordable space, access to business support assistance and coaching, broadband service, and an environment conducive to entrepreneurial growth. The incubator is a project of the Haliburton County Development Corporation (HCDC).

== Haliburton Scout Reserve (HSR) ==
Haliburton County is also home to the largest Scout Reserve in Canada, the third largest in North America. Haliburton Scout Reserve was founded in 1967.

== Notable people ==
- Matt Duchene, NHL player currently playing for the Dallas Stars
- Cody Hodgson, retired NHL Player
- R. D. Lawrence, Canadian naturalist and wildlife author
- Ian "Scotty" Morrison, retired NHL referee and former head of The Hockey Hall of Fame
- Bernie Nicholls, former NHL player
- Oscar Peterson (1925 – 2007) jazz pianist, owned a cottage on Big Straggle Lake
- Ron Stackhouse, former NHL player
- Lesley Tashlin, Olympic Athlete
- Mike Bradley, Professional Football Player, CFL

== Media ==
Haliburton County is served by three newspapers, The Haliburton Echo, The Highlander and The Minden Times, and two radio stations, 100.9 Canoe FM and 93.5 The Moose.

== In popular culture ==
- Certain scenes were filmed on location at Camp Wanakita and Kilcoo Camp for the Disney Channel original movie, Camp Rock.
- Camp White Pine was the location of the 1979 Canadian comedy film Meatballs. The 2011 cast reunion was held at nearby Camp Timberlane Canada, which was intended to be the original shooting location of the film.

== Forest fire protection history ==
The former Dysart fire tower was erected in 1956 on a hill by the east side of Haliburton village just off Highway 118. Its 100-foot (30 m) frame still stands, but the towerman's cupola has since been removed. It was erected by Ontario's former Department of Lands and Forests (now the MNR) as an early detection to protect the local forests from fire. This tower was put out of use in the late 1960s when aerial detection systems were put in place. It was one of the County of Haliburton's many towers that were part of the former Lindsay Forest Fire District. Other towers included: Harburn, Eyre, Green's Mountain, Harvey, Cardiff, Digby, Lutterworth, Sherbourne (St. Nora), Dorset, and Bruton. When a fire was spotted in the forest a towerman would get the degree bearings from his respective tower and radio back the information to headquarters. When one or more towermen from other towers in the area would also call in their bearings, the forest rangers at headquarters could get a 'triangulation' read and plot the exact location of the fire on their map. This way a team of forest firefighters could be dispatched as soon as possible to get the fire under control. There were Department of Lands and Forests headquarters stations in Minden, Ontario and at St. Nora Lake (later the Leslie Frost Centre), which offered forest ranger training from 1945 onwards.

== See also ==
- List of municipalities in Ontario
- List of townships in Ontario
