= Trent River (Ontario) =

Coordinates: 44°5′54″N 77°34′15″W

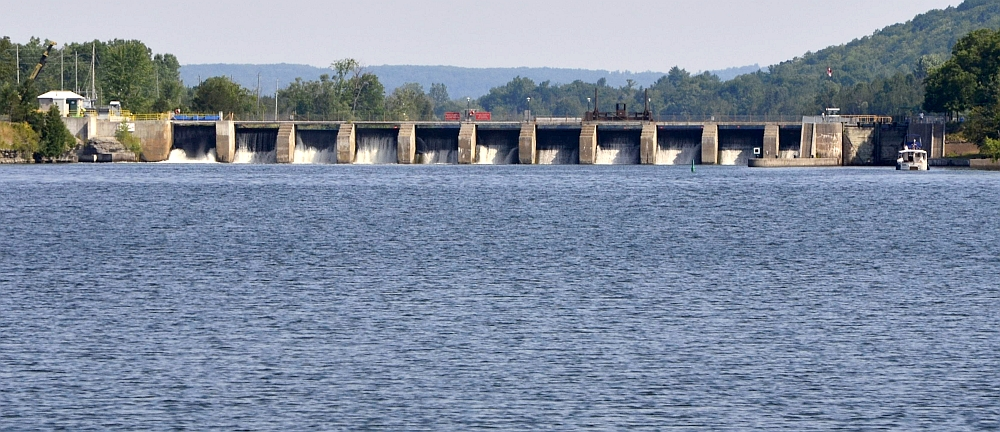
- Trent River south of Batawa Dam and Locks

Location
- Country: Canada
- Province: Ontario

Physical characteristics
- Source: Rice Lake
- Mouth: Bay of Quinte (Lake Ontario)
  - location: Trenton
- Length: 90 km (56 mi)

The Trent River is a river in Southeastern Ontario that flows from Rice Lake to empty into the Bay of Quinte on Lake Ontario. The river is part of the Trent-Severn Waterway, which leads to Georgian Bay, and is 90 kilometres (56 mi) long. The Trent drains a large portion of South-Central Ontario including most of the Kawartha Lakes and their supplying watersheds.

The river is host to numerous species of birds, amphibians and fish. Some species of fish in the river include Smallmouth bass, Largemouth bass, Pike, Walleye, Freshwater drums, Crappie, as well as other smaller fish such as Sunfish, Rock Bass and Bluegill.

Located in the traditional territory of the Mississauga Anishinaabek, Trent River's name in Ojibwe is both "zaagidawijiwanaang" and "Saugechewigewonk", meaning "Strong Rapids Waters".

Tributaries of the river include the Crowe River and the Otonabee River, which runs through the city of Peterborough, Ontario. Trent University, located in Peterborough, is named after the region and was founded to provide university education to the area.

In 2008 water soldier was reported found along the shore line. Imported from Europe, it is a common pond plant and is purchased in garden stores. It has sharp leaves and is a possible concern, as the plant spreads quickly by asexual reproduction.

== See also ==
- List of Ontario rivers
- Mephisto Lake
- The Murray Marsh

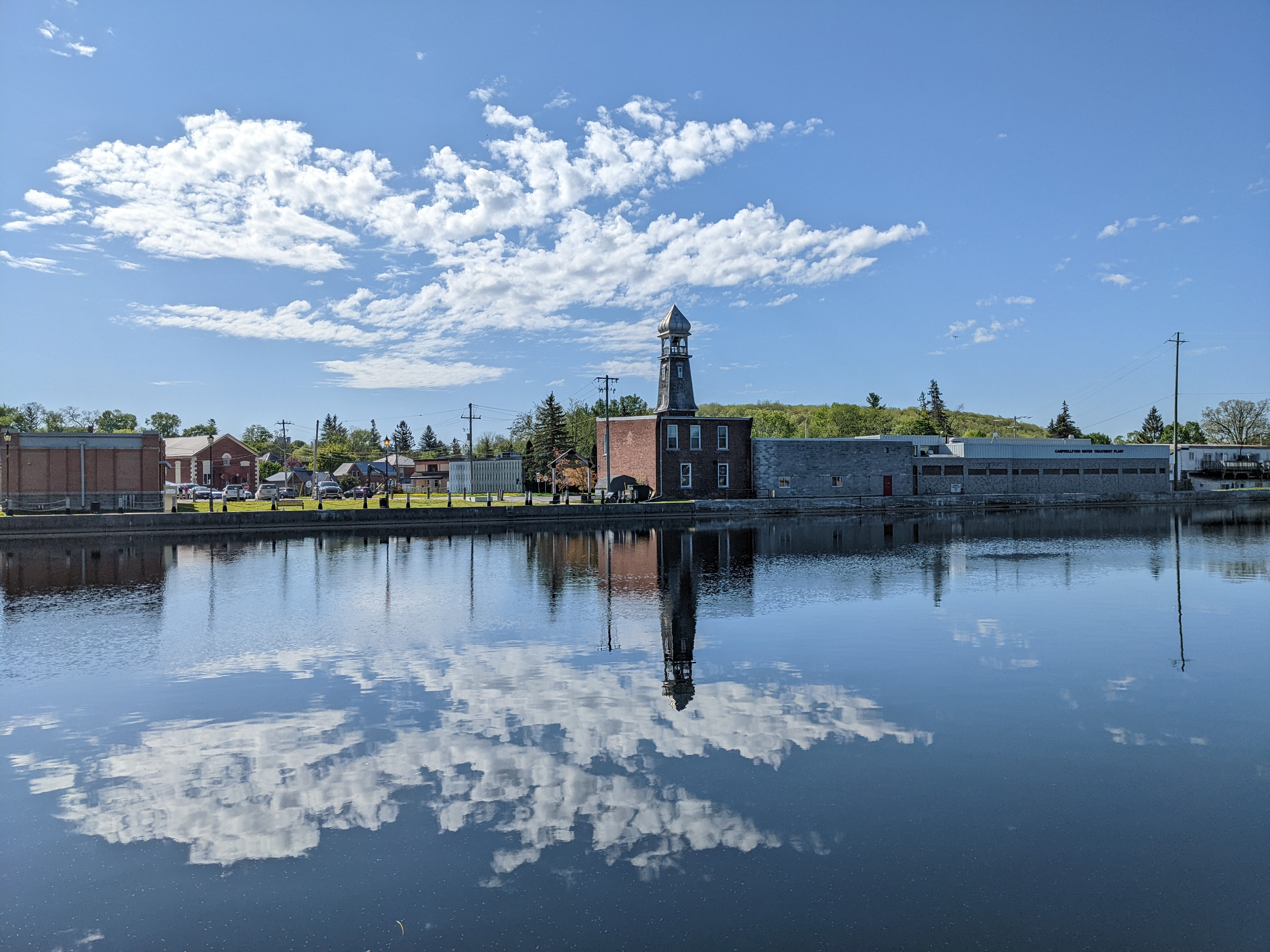
The Trent River passing through Campbellford, Ontario.
