= Ontario Student Classics Conference =

The Ontario Student Classics Conference (OSCC) is an annual event committed to the promotion and appreciation of studies in Classics. It is a four-day competition that occurs in early May at Brock University of St. Catharines, Ontario. Initially, the Conference was established as an extension of the National Junior Classical League (NJCL) but has since expanded and grown to become one of the largest and most popular conferences in Ontario, with over 500 students attending each year from 15-20 schools. The conference is dedicated to the study of Classics; students compete in over 100 academic, athletic, and creative competitions all based on aspects of Classical life.

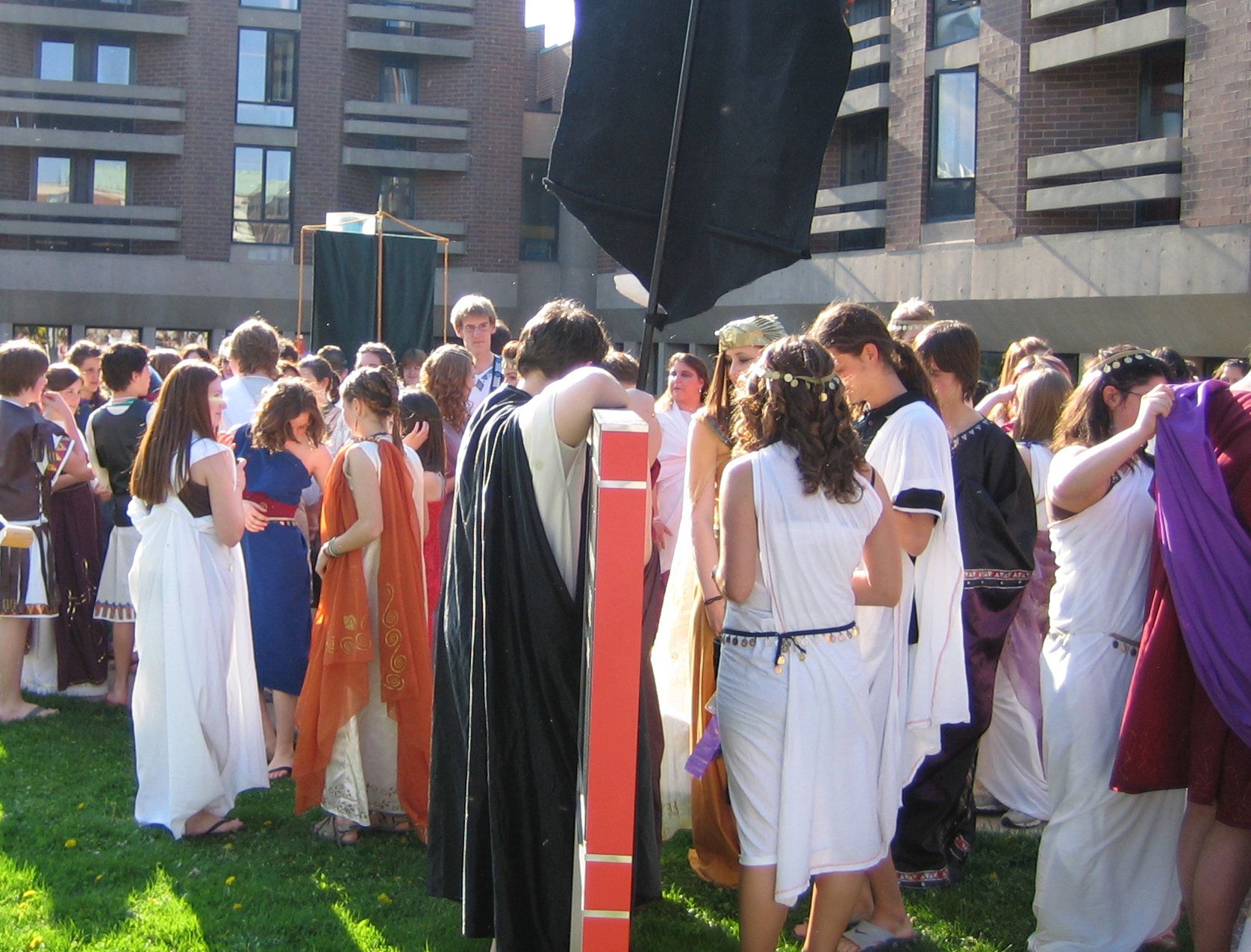
Students gather for the Pompa during the 2006 OSCC.

In addition to competitions, students also participate in different classically themed events, one of these being the "Pompa" (Latin for "Parade"). For this event everyone is required to dressed appropriately in classical attire, namely togas, and line up with their school to parade around the campus before attending a celebratory banquet and awards ceremony.

The OSCC is not affiliated with the Ontario Classical Association (OCA).

== Competitions ==
=== Academic contests ===
These competitions are designed to challenge students' knowledge of the cultures of Ancient Rome and Ancient Greece through the writing of a wide variety of contests. Most contests are offered at three different levels: Junior, Intermediate and Senior. The Greek Derivative and Greek Oral Reading tests only have two: Junior and Senior. Quaerite Summa does not have levels. Levels in some contests are determined by the years of language study while others are based on grade level or a combination of the two. The Academic Pentathlon consists of all five of the 'cursus' contests where Pentathletes' total score is determined by their total score achieved in all five contests.

Cursus competitions
Academic Pentathlon
Latin Vocabulary
(Written by all participants)
Latin Derivatives
(Written by all participants)
Roman Life
Roman History
Mythology

Other competitions
Latin Sight Translation	Greek Oral Reading
Greek Sight Translation	Roman History
Latin Comprehension and Grammar	Greek History
Latin Derivatives	Classical Geography
Greek Derivatives	Oral Mythology
Latin Oral Reading	Quaerite Summa: Roman Life

=== Athletic contests ===
The athletic competitions are modeled on the Ancient Olympic Games of Ancient Greece. Most events are divided by age and gender. The Relay Race, Slinging, the 50 meter freestyle race and the 100 meter freestyle race are divided only by gender. Discus Ultimus and the Chariot Race are open to everyone together.

Field events
Chariot Race	Mini-Marathon
Tug-of-War	100m Dash
Discus Ultimus	Frisbee Toss
Relay Race	Slinging

Water events
Swimming
50m Freestyle
100m Freestyle Relay
100m Mixed Medley Relay
Certamen Navale

=== Creative contests ===
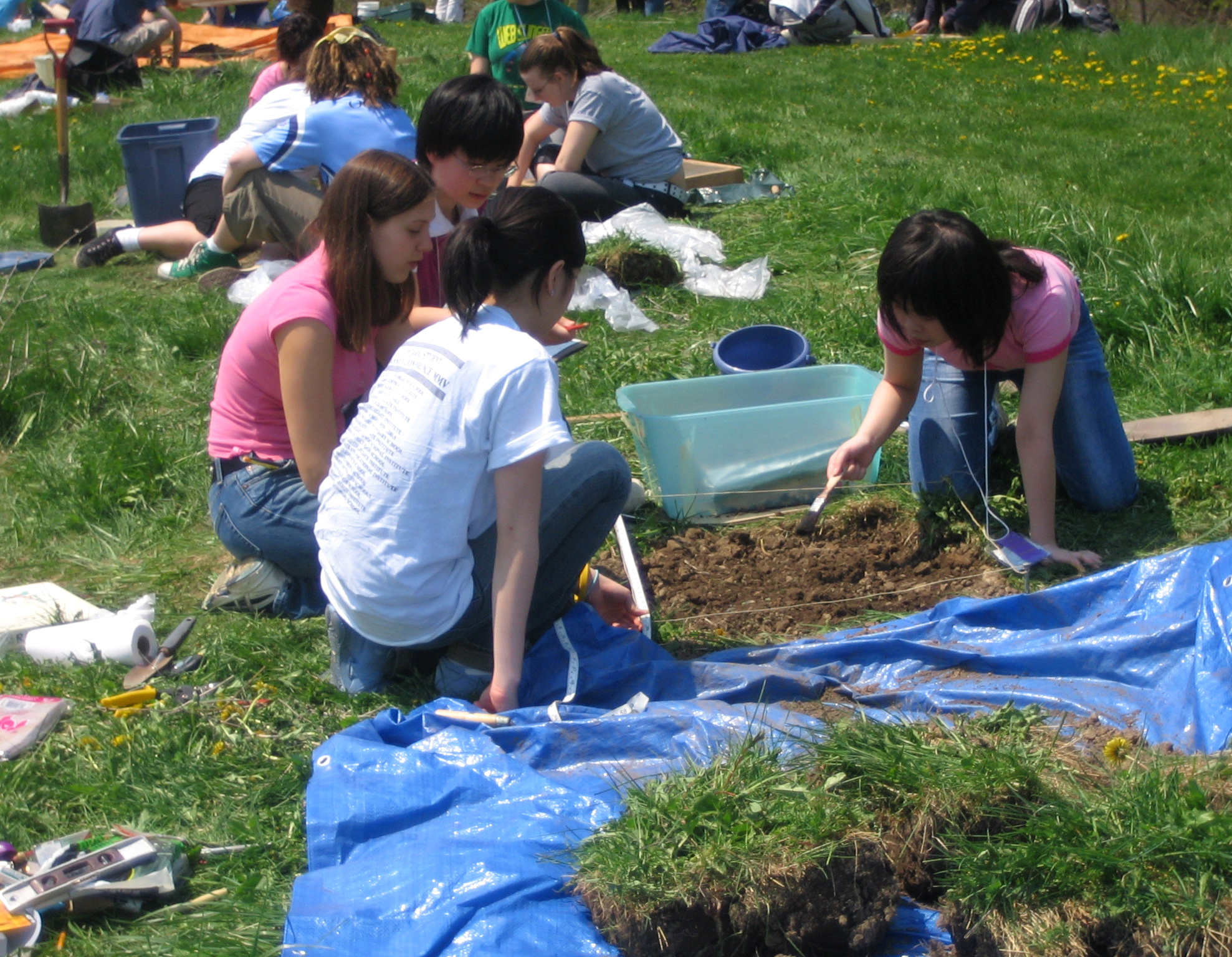
Archaeological Dig at the 2005 OSCC.

Students complete in a variety of creative events and competitions that feature the production of both ancient and modern art forms. Listed below are each of these events; the number in parentheses following the event indicates how many entries each school may submit. Also, the winner of the Best Costume event is awarded no points.

Creative events
Archaeological Dig (1)	Miscellaneous (2)
Audio-Visual (2)	Mosaic (2)
Best Costume (2)	Painting (2)
Chariot Design (1)	Posters/Charts/Maps (2)
Computer Presentation (2)	Pottery (2)
Drawing (2)	School Display (1)
Fashion Show (1)	Scrapbook (1)
Illustrated Notebook (2)	Sculpture (2)
Jewellery (2)	Skit (1)
Large Model (2)	Small Model (2)

=== Awards ===
Listed below are the trophies for each of the various OSCC competitions, which are given in addition to ribbons recognizing the top 5 placements in each event. University of Toronto Schools has won the Phyllis Morgan Trophy — generally considered the top prize — every year since 1996 (as of 2016); York Mills Collegiate Institute had won nine straight years before 1996.

ACADEMIC
Award (as of 2016)	Description
Junior Pentathlon Trophy and Medal	Awarded to the top Junior Academic Pentathlete; Dedicated in 1998; Current Winner: University of Toronto Schools
Intermediate Pentathlon Trophy and Medal	Awarded to the top Intermediate Academic Pentathlete; Dedicated in 1998; Current Winner: University of Toronto Schools
The Nancy Karrandjas Trophy and Senior Pentathlete Medal	Awarded to the top Senior Academic Pentathlete; Dedicated in 1998; Current Winner: University of Toronto Schools
Latin Sight Contest Trophy	Formerly (1968 ff.) awarded to the winner of the North York Latin Sight Competition; Presented by the North York Board of Education, 1975; Current Winner: University of Toronto Schools
Classics Conference Greek Sight Translation Trophy	Inaugurated in 1987; Current Winner: University of Toronto Schools
The Ron Walters Award: Senior Student Latin Derivatives	Inaugurated in 1993; Current Winner: University of Toronto Schools
Ontario Student Classics Conference Greek Derivatives Trophy	Inaugurated in 1998; Current Winner: University of Toronto Schools
Senior Latin Oral Reading Trophy	Donated by Dr. Katarina Cicogna through the generosity of the Consulate of Italy in 1998; Current Winner: Toronto French School
Gordon Brooks Trophy for Latin Oral Reading	Awarded to the school with the highest total number of points in Senior, Intermediate, and Junior readings; Inaugurated in 1978; Current Winner: Toronto French School
Senior Greek Oral Reading Trophy	Dedicated through the generous support of the Consul of Greece in 1996; Current Winner: University of Toronto Schools
The John Dixon Memorial Trophy for Roman History	Awarded to the individual with the highest score on the Written Roman History Competition; Inaugurated in 1975; Current Winner: University of Toronto Schools
Classics Conference Greek History Trophy	Awarded to the individual with the highest score on the Written Greek History Contest; Inaugurated in 1988; Current Winner: Markham District High School, University of Toronto Schools
The Dorothy Loch Trophy for Mythology	Awarded to the school with the most points in Junior, Intermediate and Senior Oral Mythology; Inaugurated in 1980; Current Winner: Markham District High School
Classics Conference Quaerite Summa Roman Life Trophy	Inaugurated in 1987; Current Winner: Markham District High School
John Bell Memorial Award for Outstanding Academic Achievement	Plaque and medal; Awarded to all students who place first in five academic competitions, three of which must be single events, or, if no student has won five academic firsts, to the highest-scoring student among those with three or four academic firsts; Donated by Shademan Akhavan, May 14, 1988; Current Winner: University of Toronto Schools
The Academic Medal of the Ontario Student Classics Conference	Awarded to the student with the greatest number of academic points; Donated by Michael Bales and the Toronto French School, June 2002; Current Winner: University of Toronto Schools
Latin Conference Academic Award	Awarded to the school with the greatest number of points in academic competitions; Inaugurated in 1973; Current Winner: University of Toronto Schools
Rocky Yeung Memorial Trophy for Top Academic Points Per Capita	Awarded to the school with the greatest number of points per capita in academic competitions; Inaugurated in 2004; Current Winner: University of Toronto Schools
ATHLETIC
Award (as of 2016)	Description
The James Lynd and Stephen Low Swimming Trophy	Awarded to the school with the greatest number of points in swimming competitions; Inaugurated in 2005; Current Winner: University of Toronto Schools
The Jeff Maybee Trophy for Field Events	Awarded to the school with the greatest number of points in field events, excluding the Chariot Race; Inaugurated in 2005; Current Winner: University of Toronto Schools
Chariot Race Trophy (formerly the SCI Chariot Races Trophy)	Awarded to the school with the fastest chariot race time; Inaugurated in 1968; Current Winner: Humberside Collegiate Institute
Girls' Chariot Race Trophy	Awarded to the school with the fastest girls' chariot race time; Inaugurated in 2006? Current Winner: St. Clement's School
Discus Ultimus Trophy	Awarded to the school that achieves first place in the Discus Ultimus competition; Inaugurated in 2006; Current Winner: Humberside Collegiate Institute
O.S.C.C. Certamen Navale Trophy	Awarded to the school that achieves first place in the Certamen Navale/Rafting competition; Inaugurated in 2012; Current Winner: University of Toronto Schools
Ontario Student Classics Conference Top Athlete	Awarded to the student with the greatest number of points in individual athletic competitions; Inaugurated in 1988; Current Winner: Lawrence Park Collegiate Institute, University of Toronto Schools
Latin Conference Athletic Award	Awarded to the school with the greatest number of points in athletic competitions; Inaugurated in 1974; Current Winner: University of Toronto Schools
Top Per Capita Athletic Trophy	Awarded to the school that achieves the greatest number of points (per capita) in Athletic competitions; Inaugurated in 2004; Current Winner: Branksome Hall
CREATIVE
Award (as of 2016)	Description
Chariot Design Trophy	Awarded to the school with the highest score in the Chariot Design Competition (New or Refurbished); Inaugurated in 2003; Current Winner: Elmwood School
Moushmegh Bouzbouzian; Memorial Scrapbook Trophy	Donated by the London Family whose daughters attended York Mills Collegiate; Inaugurated 1998; Current Winner: University of Toronto Schools
School Display Trophy	Awarded to the school with the highest score in the School Display Competition; Inaugurated in 2003; Current Winner: University of Toronto Schools
J.F. Kett Trophy for Archaeology	Presented in his memory by the Chippewa Latin Club in 1977; Current Winner: Toronto French School
Barrie North Classics Drama Award	Awarded to the school that achieves first place in the Skit Competition; Inaugurated in 1980; Current Winner: Toronto French School
Margaret-Anne Gillis Award for Fashion Show (formerly the Classics Conference Fashion Show Trophy)	Awarded to the school that achieves first place in the Fashion Show competition; Donated by the Barrie Central Classics Club in 1997; Inaugurated in 1998; Current Winner: Elmwood School
Sheila M. Ellison Creative Student Award	Donated by Margaret-Anne Gillis and Elizabeth Ellison in memory of their mother, Sheila M. Ellison; Awarded to the student with the greatest number of points in individual Creative events; Inaugurated in 2003; Current Winner: Elmwood School
Mary Wase Creative Award	Mary Wase was a teacher of English and Latin at Barrie Central Collegiate who donated the award to recognize the school with the greatest number of points in Creative events; Inaugurated in 1988; Current Winner: Elmwood School
Top Per Capita Creative Award	Awarded to the school that achieves the greatest number of points (per capita) in Creative events; Inaugurated in 2004; Current Winner: Elmwood School
OVERALL
Award (as of 2016)	Description
Phoenix Animus Ludorum	Awarded to the school which best demonstrates the "spirit of the games" through adherence to the Conference mission statement "mens sana in corpore sano"; Inaugurated in 2006; Current Winner: St. Clement's School
Thomson Award	Awarded to the school with the highest points per capita at Classics Conference; Presented by David and Mary Thomson C.I. in 1991; Current Winner: Elmwood School
Phyllis Morgan Trophy for Overall Excellence at Classics Conference	Awarded to the school with the greatest number of points overall; Inaugurated in 1972; Current Winner: University of Toronto Schools
Ontario Student Classics Conference; Host Trophy	Awarded to the school hosting the next OSCC; Inaugurated in 2005; Current Winner: North Toronto Collegiate Institute, Toronto French School
Minerva Award	Awarded to any individual who in at least one individual event receives placements each in Creative, Athletic and Academic competitions; Inaugurated in 2007; Current Winner: Humberside Collegiate Institute, Markham District High School, North Toronto Collegiate Institute

== Conferences by year ==
Listed below are the locations, hosts and themes for each of the past OSCC conventions (as of 2016).

Year	Location	Host	Theme
2020 (52nd Annual)	Brock University; St. Catharines, Ontario	Centennial Collegiate Vocational Institute, Waterloo Collegiate Institute	"plus insciens quis fecit quam prudens boni" ("A person has done more good unknowingly than knowingly"); Plautus, Captivi, prologue 45
2019 (51st Annual)	Brock University; St. Catharines, Ontario	University of Toronto Schools	"forsan et haec olim meminisse iuvabit..." ("Perhaps, someday, we shall be glad to remember even these things..."); Virgil, Aeneid I. 203
2018 (50th Annual)	Brock University; St. Catharines, Ontario	Innisdale Secondary School, Elmwood School	It is not because things are difficult that we do not dare, but because we do not dare that things are difficult
2017 (49th Annual)	Brock University; St. Catharines, Ontario	North Toronto Collegiate Institute, Toronto French School	"γνῶθι σεαυτόν"+"μηδέν άγαν" ("Know thyself"+"Nothing in excess"); Inscription at Delphi
2016 (48th Annual)	Brock University; St. Catharines, Ontario	St. Clement's School	"The wise indeed learn much from their foes"
2015 (47th Annual)	Brock University; St. Catharines, Ontario	Lawrence Park Collegiate Institute	"ubi concordia, ibi victoria" ("Where there is harmony, there is victory."); Publilius Syrus, Sententiae
2014 (46th Annual)	Brock University; St. Catharines, Ontario	Humberside Collegiate Institute; Branksome Hall	"ἴωμεν, ὅπως ἐπεγγελάσωμεν. ξείνων δ᾽ εὖ πρασσόντων ἔσαναν αὐτίκ᾽ἐσλοί". ("Come let us laugh! When friends are successful the noble immediately smile."); Plutarch, Moralia (Dialogue on Love) and Pindar, Olympian
2013 (45th Annual)	Brock University; St. Catharines, Ontario	Centennial Collegiate Vocational Institute	"serit arbores quae saeclo prosint alteri" ("He plants trees to be useful to another generation"); Caecilius Statius
2012 (44th Annual)	Brock University; St. Catharines, Ontario	Barrie Central Collegiate Institute	"faber est suae quisque fortunae" ("Each person is the creator of his/her own destiny"); Appius Claudius Caecus
2011 (43rd Annual)	Brock University; St. Catharines, Ontario	The Linden School	"haec res et iungit iunctos et servat amicos" ("This is how to make friends and keep them made"); Horace, Satires
2010 (42nd Annual)	Brock University; St. Catharines, Ontario	Waterloo Collegiate Institute	"Citius, Altius, Fortius" ("Swifter, Higher, Stronger"); Pierre de Coubertin, Olympic motto
2009 (41st Annual)	Brock University; St. Catharines, Ontario	Markham District High School; Banting Memorial High School	"Regia res est succurrere lapsis — δόσιs δ'ỏλίγη τε фίλη τε" ("It's a kingly act to help those who fall — the gift is still precious though be it small" Ovid, Epistulae ex Ponto and Homer, The Odyssey
2008 (40th Annual)	Brock University; St. Catharines, Ontario	St. Clement's School	"Festina lente" ("Make haste slowly")
2007 (39th Annual)	Brock University; St. Catharines, Ontario	University of Toronto Schools	"ὃ τι καλόν φίλον άεί" ("A thing of beauty is a joy forever"); Euripides, The Bacchae
2006 (38th Annual)	Brock University; St. Catharines, Ontario	Elmwood School	"De his factis in perpetuum dicant" ("Let them speak of these deeds forever!")
2005 (37th Annual)	Brock University; St. Catharines, Ontario	North Toronto Collegiate Institute; Toronto French School	"χαλεπα τα καλα" ("Fine things are difficult"); Plato, Hippias Major
2004 (36th Annual)	Brock University; St. Catharines, Ontario	Barrie Central Collegiate Institute	"Fides et pietas" ("Faith and piety")
2003 (35th Annual)	Brock University; St. Catharines, Ontario	Humberside Collegiate Institute	"Felix, qui potuit rerum cognoscere causas" ("Happy is he who is able to know the causes of things"); Virgil, Georgics
2002 (34th Annual)	Brock University; St. Catharines, Ontario	Leaside High School	"Mirabile dictu" ("Marvellous to speak of!"); Virgil, Georgics
2001 (33rd Annual)	Brock University; St. Catharines, Ontario	Elmwood School	"σε θυμω τερψομαι εισοροων νεον αλλοθεν ενδον εοντα" ("Let me feast my eyes on the wanderer just home"); Homer, The Odyssey
2000 (32nd Annual)	University of Guelph; Guelph, Ontario	University of Toronto Schools	"Bona iam peractis iungite fata" ("Link happy destinies to those already past"); Horace, Odes
1999 (31st Annual)	University of Guelph; Guelph, Ontario	Bishop Strachan School	"Facilis descensus Averno" ("Easy is the descent to the underworld"); Virgil, Aeneid
1998 (30th Annual)	Brock University; St. Catharines, Ontario	Barrie Central Collegiate Institute	"Multas per gentes et multa per aequora" ("Across many lands and across many seas"); Catullus, Catullus 101
1997 (29th Annual)	Brock University; St. Catharines, Ontario	O'Neill Collegiate	"Vivamus atque amemus" ("Let us live and let us love"); Catullus, Catullus 5
1996 (28th Annual)	Queen's University; Kingston, Ontario	Leaside High School	"Integer vitae" ("The upright life"); Horace, Odes
1995 (27th Annual)	Queen's University; Kingston, Ontario	Barrie Central Collegiate Institute	"Fortuna fortibus favet" ("Fortune favours the brave")
1994 (26th Annual)	Trent University; Peterborough, Ontario	Banting Memorial High School	"Mens sana in corpore sano" ("A healthy mind in a healthy body"); Juvenal, Satires
1993 (25th Annual)	Trent University; Peterborough, Ontario	Branksome Hall	"Ad astra" ("To the stars"); Virgil, Aeneid
1992 (24th Annual)	University of Waterloo; Waterloo, Ontario	Elmira District High School	"Amor omnia vincit" ("Love conquers all"); Virgil, Eclogues
1991 (23rd Annual)	University of Waterloo; Waterloo, Ontario	David and Mary Thomson Collegiate	
1990 (22nd Annual)	Queen's University; Kingston, Ontario	Elmwood School	
1989 (21st Annual)	Queen's University; Kingston, Ontario	Bishop Strachan School	"Pax Romana" ("The Roman Peace")
1988 (20th Annual)	Barrie North Collegiate Institute; Barrie, Ontario	Barrie North Collegiate Institute	
1987 (19th Annual)	Barrie North Collegiate Institute; Barrie, Ontario	Brantford Collegiate Institute	"Feste Romana" ("A Roman Festival")
1986 (18th Annual)	Havergal College; Toronto, Ontario	Havergal College	"Nunc aut numquam" ("Now or Never")
1985 (17th Annual)	Banting Memorial High School; Alliston, Ontario	Banting Memorial High School	
1984 (16th Annual)	Barrie Central Collegiate Institute; Barrie, Ontario	Barrie Central Collegiate Institute	The Olympic Games
1983 (15th Annual)	York Mills Collegiate Institute; Toronto, Ontario	York Mills Collegiate Institute	
1982 (14th Annual)	Park Street Collegiate Institute; Orillia, Ontario	Park Street Collegiate Institute	
1981 (13th Annual)	Banting Memorial High School; Alliston, Ontario	Banting Memorial High School	
1980 (12th Annual)	Barrie North Collegiate Institute; Barrie, Ontario	Barrie North Collegiate Institute	
1979 (11th Annual)	Chippewa High School; North Bay, Ontario	Chippewa High School	"Annus liberorum" (UNESCO - "Year of the Child")
1978 (10th Annual)	Banting Memorial High School; Alliston, Ontario	Banting Memorial High School	
1977 (9th Annual)			
1976	No conference was held this year.		
1975 (8th Annual)	Chippewa High School; North Bay, Ontario	Chippewa High School	
1974 (7th Annual)	Chippewa High School; North Bay, Ontario	Chippewa High School	
1973 (6th Annual)	Barrie North Collegiate Institute; Barrie, Ontario	Barrie North Collegiate Institute	
1972 (5th Annual)			
1971 (4th Annual)	Chippewa High School; North Bay, Ontario	Chippewa High School	
1970 (3rd Annual)	New Liskeard High School; Temiskaming Shores, Ontario	New Liskeard High School	
1969 (2nd Annual)	Korah Collegiate; Sault Ste. Marie, Ontario	Korah Collegiate	
1968 (1st Annual)			
