= NPSS =

NPSS may refer to:

- IEEE Nuclear and Plasma Sciences Society, a transnational group of about 3000 professional engineers and scientists
- Norman Park State School, a co-educational, state primary school in Norman Park, Queensland, Australia
- North Park Secondary School, a high school located in Brampton, Ontario, Canada
- Nottawasaga Pines Secondary School, a high school located in Angus, Ontario, Canada
- National Public Safety Solutions, a company located in Austin, Texas, United States
- Numerical Propulsion System Simulation, software usually used to analyze gas turbine engines

• Netherlands Park Secondary School, numerous private schools in South Africa
