= CFB Borden =

Military base in Ontario, Canada

Canadian Forces Base Borden 16 Wing Borden

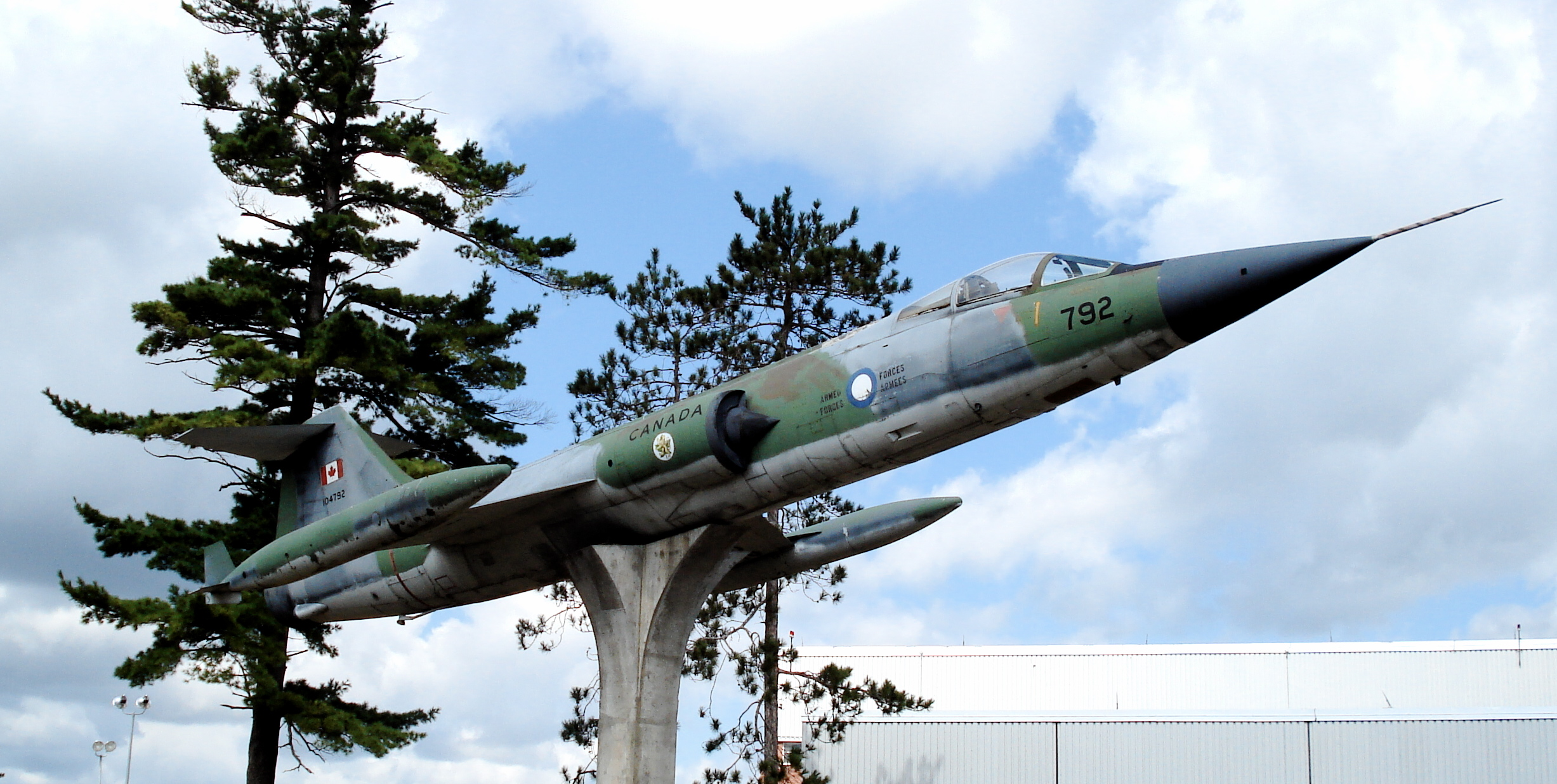
- A CF-104 Starfighter on display at CFB Borden Military Museum
- IATA: YBN; ICAO: CYBN

Summary
- Airport type: Military
- Owner: Government of Canada
- Operator: Department of National Defence
- Location: Borden
- Built: 1916
- Commander: Colonel Adam Moore
- Occupants: No. 400 Squadron RCAF
- Time zone: EST (UTC−05:00)
  - Summer (DST): EDT (UTC−04:00)
- Elevation AMSL: 729 ft (222 m)
- Coordinates: 44°16′18″N 079°54′45″W
- Website: https://www.canada.ca/en/department-national-defence/services/bases-support-units/canadian-forces-base-borden.html

Map
- Location of CFB Borden in Ontario CYBN (Canada)

Helipads
Number	Length		Surface
Number	ft	m	Surface
H1	100	30	Asphalt
- Source: Canada Flight Supplement

Canadian Forces Base Borden (also CFB Borden, French: Base des Forces canadiennes Borden or BFC Borden), formerly RCAF Station Camp Borden, is a Canadian Forces base located in Ontario. The historic birthplace of the Royal Canadian Air Force, CFB Borden is home to the largest training wing in the Canadian Armed Forces. The base is run by Military Personnel Generation and Training Group (MPGTG) and reports to the Military Personnel Generation Group (MPGG) in Ottawa.

== History ==
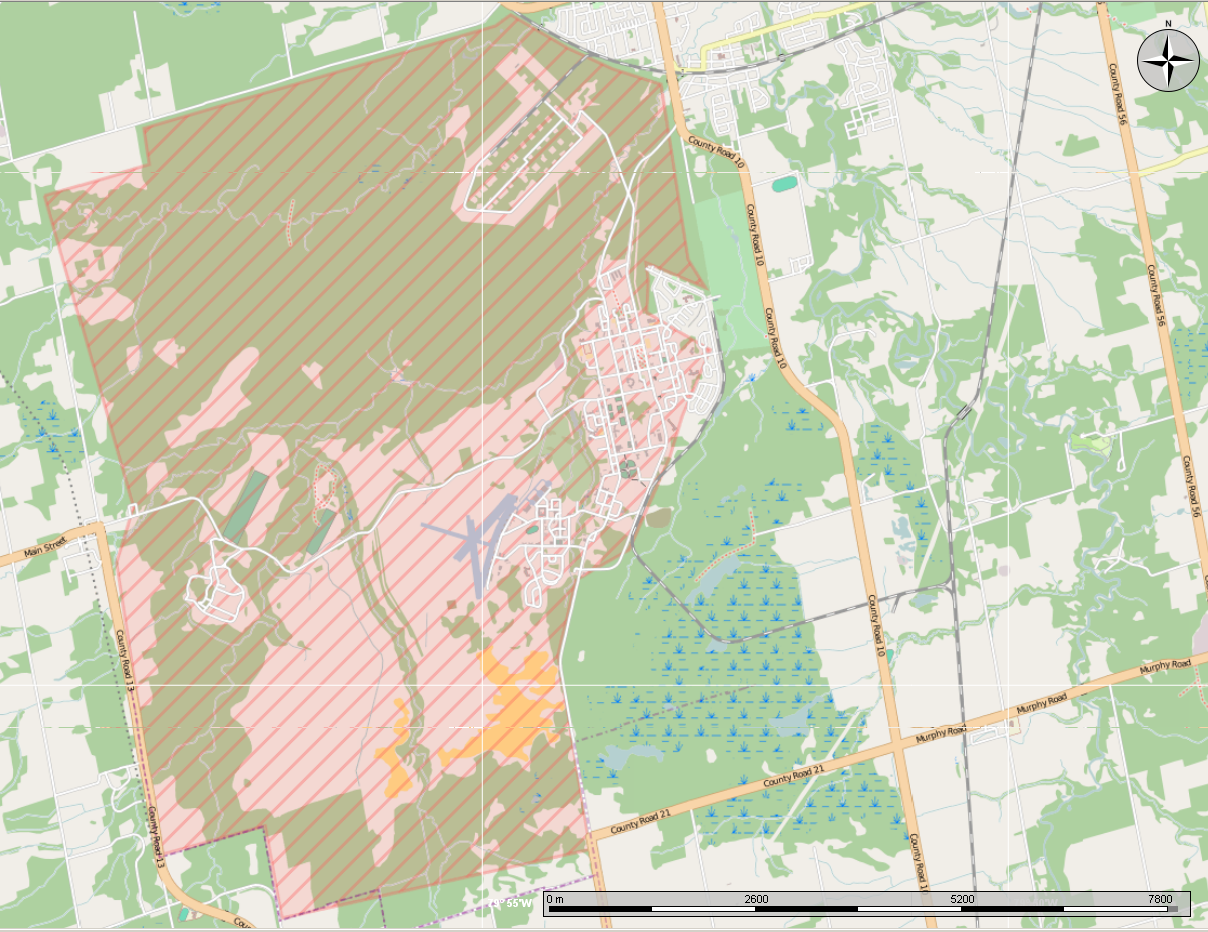
Map of the base

At the height of the First World War, the Borden Military Camp opened at a location on a glacial moraine west of Barrie in 1916 to train units for the Canadian Expeditionary Force. It was named for Sir Frederick William Borden, former Minister of Militia. In May 1916, the Barrie and Collingwood companies of the 157th Battalion (Simcoe Foresters), CEF (perpetuated today by The Grey and Simcoe Foresters), under the command of Lieutenant-Colonel D.H. MacLaren, began construction of the camp. Camp Borden was selected in 1917 for a military aerodrome, becoming the first flying station of the Royal Flying Corps Canada.

During the inter-war period, the aerodrome was used for veteran pilot refresher training by the Canadian Air Force (CAF), a part-time, non-permanent air militia. This militia training scheme began in July 1920 and ended in March 1922. Although this training had ended, the CAF continued, reorganized, and eventually evolved into the Royal Canadian Air Force (RCAF). Pilot training resumed in May 1923. The air force also conducted specialist courses. Other schools included an Army Co-operation School, an Air Armament & Bombing School and a Technical Training School. When the air force became “royal” in 1924, the station was renamed RCAF Station Camp Borden.

Camp Borden's training grounds were expanded in 1938 to house the Canadian Tank School. The Siskins were a RCAF aerobatic flying team that was established in 1929 at Camp Borden.

During the Second World War, both Camp Borden and RCAF Station Camp Borden became the most important training facility in Canada, housing both army training and flight training, the latter under the British Commonwealth Air Training Plan (BCATP). The BCATP's No. 1 Service Flying Training School (SFTS) was located here until 1946. Relief landing fields were located at Alliston and Edenvale. A third landing field, known locally as Leach's Field, was operated by Camp Borden from the 1920s to the 1950s. The L-shaped airstrip was rudimentary; the "runways" at Leach's Field utilized the existing ground surface. It was primarily used for touch-and-go flying.

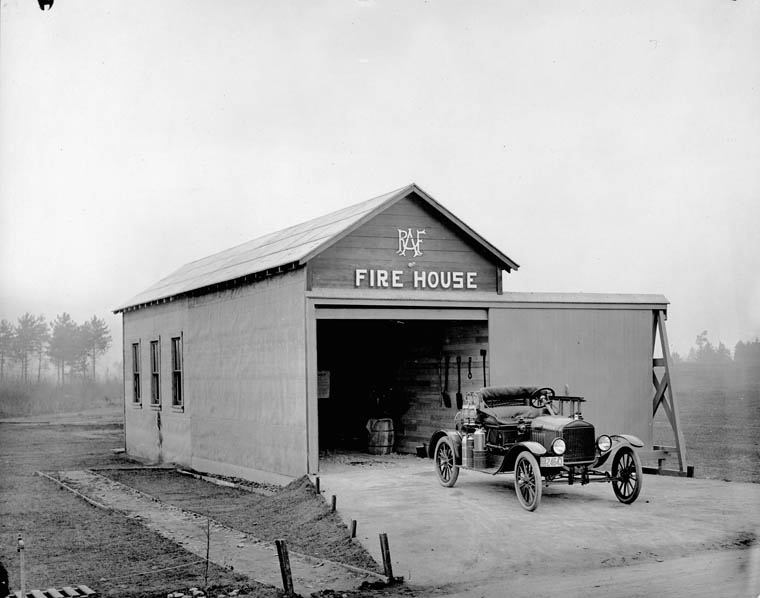
Royal Canadian Air Force fire house, Camp Borden, Ontario

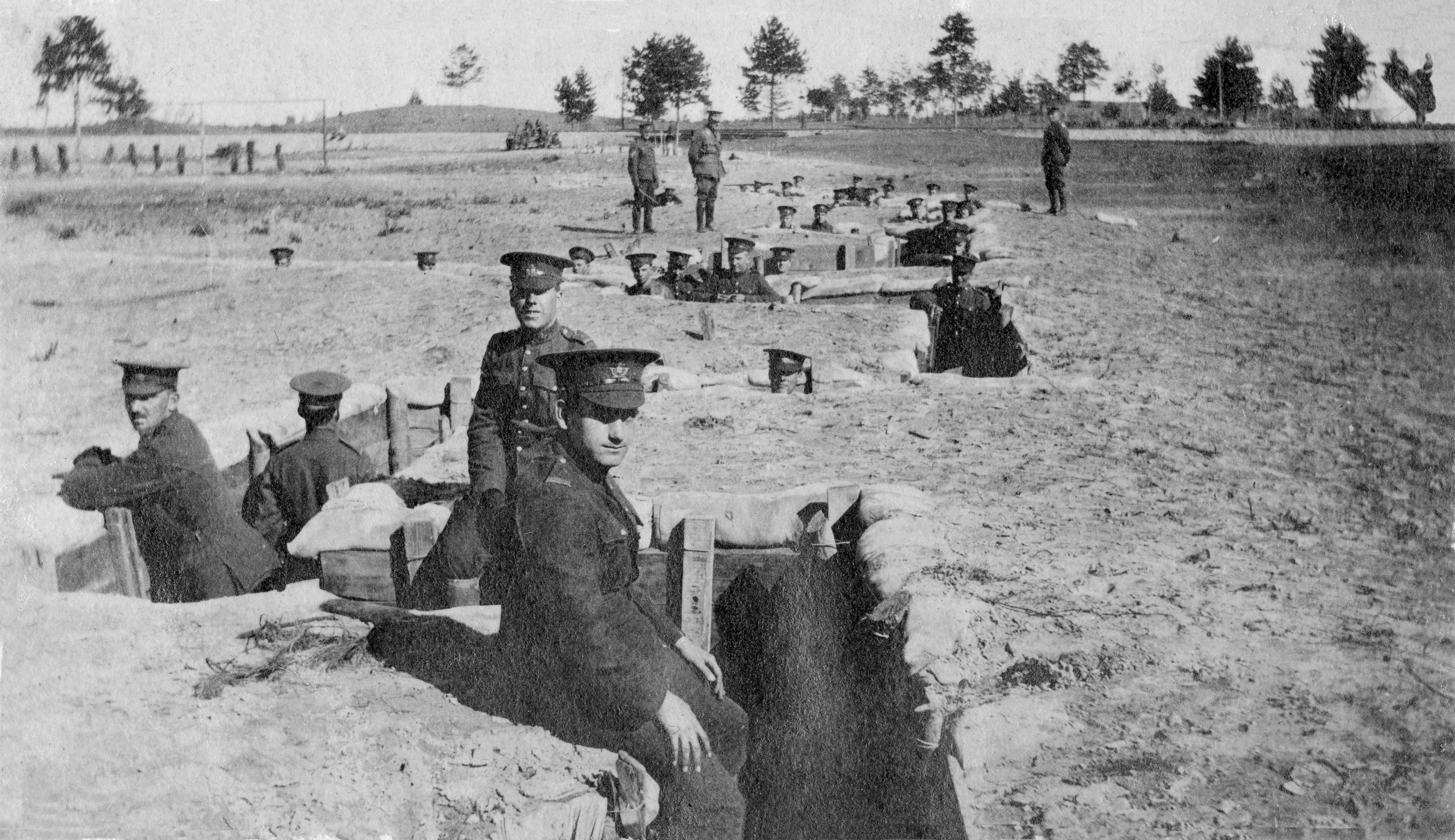
Soldiers training for trench warfare at Camp Borden in 1916

During the Cold War, Borden's importance as an RCAF facility in Ontario declined in favour of CFB Trenton, CFB Uplands and CFB North Bay. However, its use as an army facility stayed consistent until 1970 when a major reorganization of the combat arms' schools resulted in the transfer of the Infantry School and Armoured School to CFB Gagetown in New Brunswick. On the other hand, numerous "purple" (i.e. tri-service) schools were established or expanded from existing service training establishments, including the Canadian Forces School of Administration and Logistics, the School of Aerospace Ordnance Engineering and the Canadian Forces Health Service Training Centre. The February 1, 1968 unification of the RCAF with the Royal Canadian Navy and the Canadian Army resulted in the creation of the Canadian Forces. The military facilities consisting of Camp Borden and RCAF Camp Station Borden were grouped under a new name, Canadian Forces Base Borden (CFB Borden). The aerodrome was closed in 1970 and the base saw use as a regular and reserve training facility for Canadian Forces Land Force Command (the army), as well as hosting various land-based training courses for Canadian Forces Air Command (the air force).

In a 1990s reorganization of the Canadian Forces following the end of the Cold War, CFB Borden's air force training facilities were grouped under the name 16 Wing Borden. The eight surviving Royal Flying Corps hangars at the base have been designated a National Historic Site of Canada.

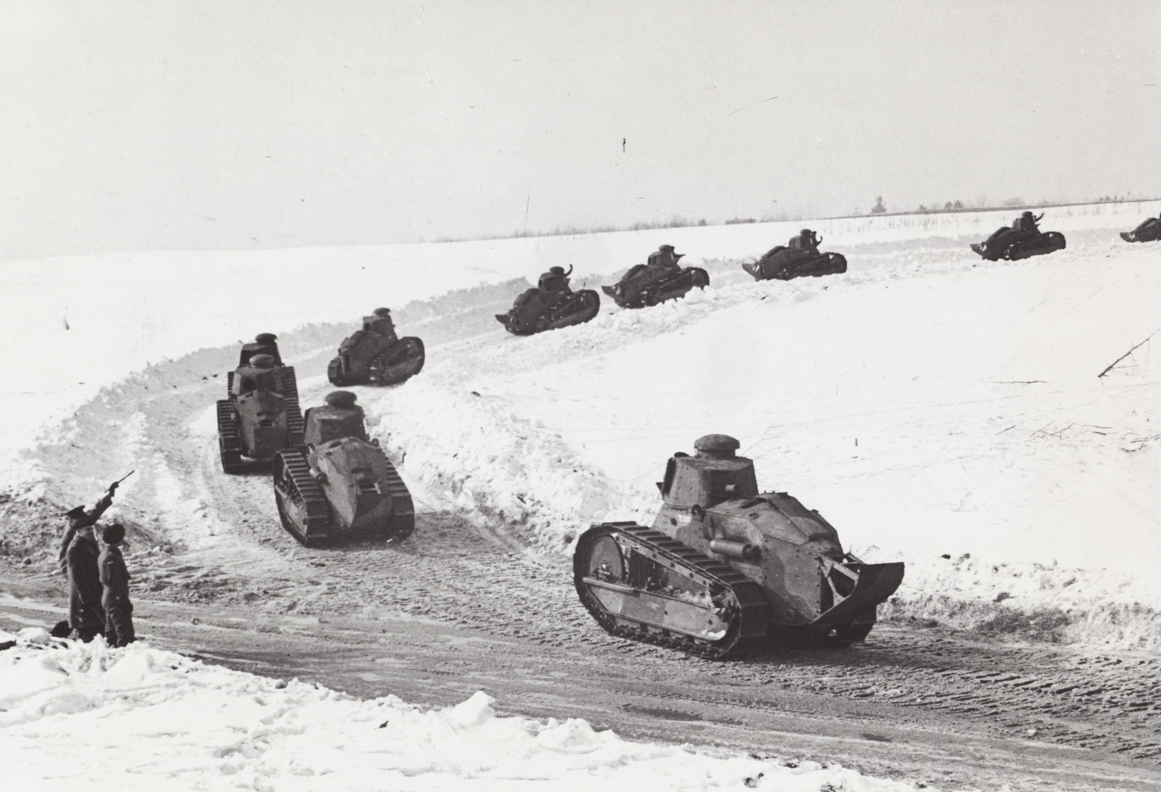
Tanks received from the US making a training manoeuvre at Camp Borden

== Plaque ==
The Ontario Heritage Foundation, Ministry of Culture and Recreation erected a plaque in 1976.

Camp Borden was established during the First World War as a major training centre of Canadian Expeditionary Force battalions. The Camp (including this structure) was officially opened by Sir Sam Hughes, Minister of Militia and Defence, on July 11, 1916, after two months of intensive building. This military reserve, comprising over twenty square miles, was soon occupied by some 32,000 troops. Training facilities were expanded in 1917 with the institution of an air training programme under the Royal Flying Corps, Canada, and the construction of the first Canadian military aerodrome, regarded as the finest military aviation camp in North America. Following the armistice Camp Borden continued as an important army and air force centre and became one of the largest armed forces bases in Canada.

== Activities and facilities ==
Although originally an air force training base, CFB Borden is now a training base for several elements of the Canadian Forces:

- 2 Canadian Air Division's (2 Cdn Air Div) primary lodger unit, 16 Wing, commonly referred to as 16 Wing Borden, consists of 16 Wing Headquarters and three schools: the Canadian Forces School of Aerospace Technology and Engineering (CFSATE), the Royal Canadian Air Force Academy (RCAF Academy), and the Canadian Forces School of Aerospace Control (CFSACO), located in Cornwall, Ontario.
- The Canadian Army's (CA) Regular Force and Primary Reserve army units use a number of training schools and large portions of the base's 22,300 acres (90 km^{2}) training area for manoeuvres. In addition to these specific environmental element commands, CFB Borden houses a variety of other purple trades training facilities and headquarters within the Canadian Forces, including a fire-fighting school, Military Police (MP) school, a chaplaincy school, the Canadian Forces Recruiting Group, medical, dental and language schools, and supports local cadet and reserve units. The Toronto Police Service's Emergency Task Force also trains there occasionally. CFB Borden hosts the Blackdown Cadet Training Centre, a facility established for training army cadets. This facility has also hosted air cadets and sea cadets since 2003, when the Borden Air Cadet Summer Training Centre was closed. CFB Borden's residential area houses one regulation-sized golf course (Circled Pine Golf Course, par 72). Circled Pine Golf Course opened in 1952. The course is open to the public and serving Military. The base previously housed a 9-hole links style course, Anderson Park, which originally opened in 1917 but closed after the 2015 season. Base Borden has multiple facilities available to Canadian Armed Forces members that include the Terra theatre, Circled Pine Bowling Centre, two gyms (Buell Fitness & Aquatic Centre and the sub gym, aka 'the bubble'), multiple soccer fields, baseball diamonds, Andy Anderson arena and biking trails. The Base Borden Military Museum (combining four separate museums) has numerous items, equipment and vehicles from all eras of Canadian military history, including a large number of armoured vehicles and aircraft displayed outside in Worthington Park and around the headquarters area of the base. In December 2017, a military parade of the RCAF took place in honour of the anniversary of the Battle of Britain. In August 2010, the Canadian department of Defence announced a C$209 million series of projects to construct new facilities, and upgrade existing facilities, at CFB Borden.
- A voluntary Canadian military band is maintained at the base. A band at Borden was first formed in the late 1930s, before becoming the No. 6 Bomber Group Band under the leadership of Clifford Hunt. It was stationed in the United Kingdom from 1942-1946. The modern band is organized only during the summer and consists of reservists from all three services who serve at the Canadian Forces Logistics Training Centre.
Activities and facilities

Royal Canadian Army Cadets.

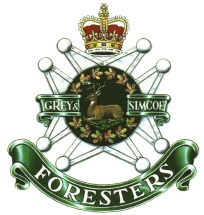
The Grey and Simcoe Foresters

== Aerodrome ==
In approximately 1942, the aerodrome was listed at 44°16′N 79°56′W with a variation of 8 degrees west and elevation of 730 ft (220 m). Three runways were listed as follows:

Runway name	Length	Width	Surface
5/23	3,500 ft (1,100 m)	550 ft (170 m)	Hard surfaced
11/29	3,500 ft (1,100 m)	550 ft (170 m)	Hard surfaced
18/36	3,500 ft (1,100 m)	550 ft (170 m)	Hard surfaced

At some point after the Second World War, runway 11/29 was abandoned and the other two runways were shortened. Just prior to 2004, the runways were listed as follows:

Runway name	Length
5/23	830 m (2,720 ft)
18/36	1,000 m (3,300 ft)

In 2004, the decision was made to close the remaining runways to all aircraft other than helicopters. Only the taxiway and a small section of runway 05/23 remain today (the rest is covered with grass). A helicopter pad is still active at the base of the former runway.

== Units ==
The main units of Canadian Forces Base Borden are:

=== Integral ===
- HQ
- Technical Services
- Base Operations
- Administration Branch
- Comptroller Branch
- Management Advisory Services
- Military Personnel Generation Training Group (MPGTG) HQ

=== Lodger ===
- Canadian Forces Ammunition Depot Angus
- Canadian Forces Recruiting Group HQ
- 31 Canadian Forces Health Services Centre
- 32 Signal Regiment, 1 Squadron
- Canadian Forces Health Services Training Centre
- 1 Dental Unit Detachment Borden
- Royal Canadian Electrical and Mechanical Engineering School
- Canadian Forces Military Police Academy
- 3rd Canadian Ranger Patrol Group
- The Grey and Simcoe Foresters
- 400 Tactical Helicopter Squadron
- Regional Cadet Support Unit Central
- Regional Cadet Instruction School Central
- Blackdown Cadet Training Centre
- Shared Services Canada Detachment Borden
- Military Police Detachment Borden
- Real Property Operations Detachment (Borden)
- Civilian Human Resources Centre
- Deputy Judge Advocate – Borden
- Learning and Career Centre
- Dispute Resolution Centre
- Complaint Management Centre
- PSP National Training Centre
- 16 Wing Borden HQ
- Canadian Forces School of Aerospace Technology and Engineering
- Royal Canadian Air Force Academy

=== MPGTG ===
- Canadian Forces Chaplain School and Centre (CFChSC)
- Canadian Forces Fire and CBRN Academy (CFFCA)
- Canadian Forces Logistics Training Centre (CFLTC)
- Canadian Forces Training Development Centre (CFTDC)
- Canadian Forces School of Music (CFSM)
- Canadian Forces Military Police Academy (CFMPA)

== Tributes ==
The aircraft control tower is dedicated to the memory of Royal Flying Corps Cadet James Harold Talbot. Talbot became the first fatality at Camp Borden when his Curtiss J.N.4 'Jenny' aeroplane crashed on April 8, 1917. The Air Force Annex of the Base Borden Military Museum is dedicated in memory of First World War Victoria Cross recipient Lieutenant Alan Arnett McLeod, the youngest Canadian airman to receive the award. Worthington Park, a part of the Base Borden Military Museum complex, is named after Major-General F. F. Worthington (Frederic Franklin Worthington), the father of the Royal Canadian Armoured Corps. General Worthington is buried in Worthington Park.

== Air shows ==
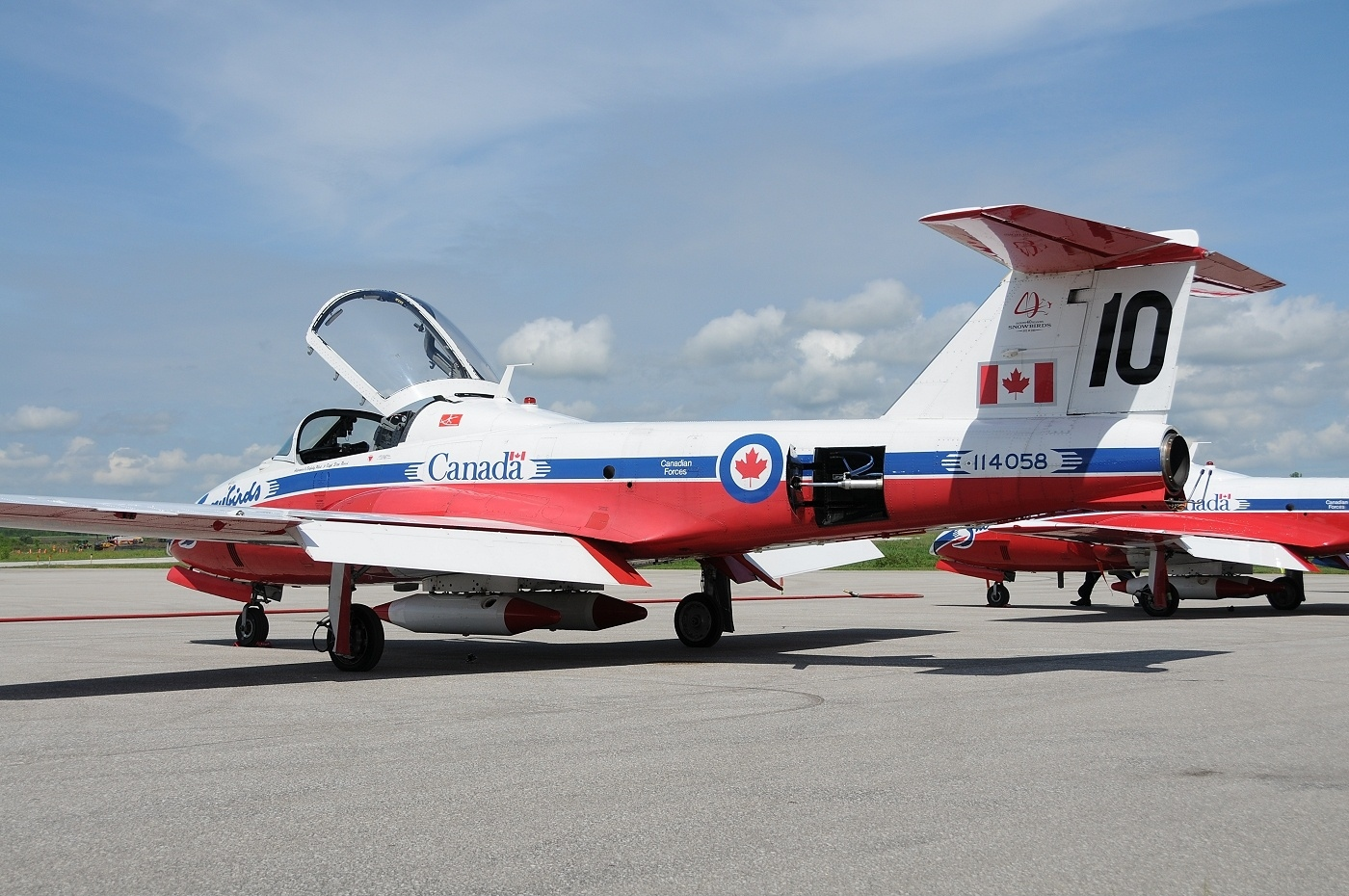
Snowbird 10 sporting the 40th season anniversary sticker above the Canadian flag. 431 squadron was in town for the CFB Borden Canadian Forces Day and Air Show.

On specific days, CFB Borden organised air shows. For example:

- In 2016, CFB Borden organised an air show for the centennial of the Royal Canadian Air Force.
- In 2017, CFB Borden organised an air show for the 150th anniversary of Canada.
- In 2018, CFB Borden organised an air show for Canadian Armed Forces Day.

== Economy ==
- CFB Borden local spending impact: $296,062,000
- CFB Borden estimated local spending impacts: $472,387,000 (direct & indirect)
- CFB Borden estimated direct employment: 5,158
- CFB Borden estimated indirect employment: 518

== Federal heritage ==
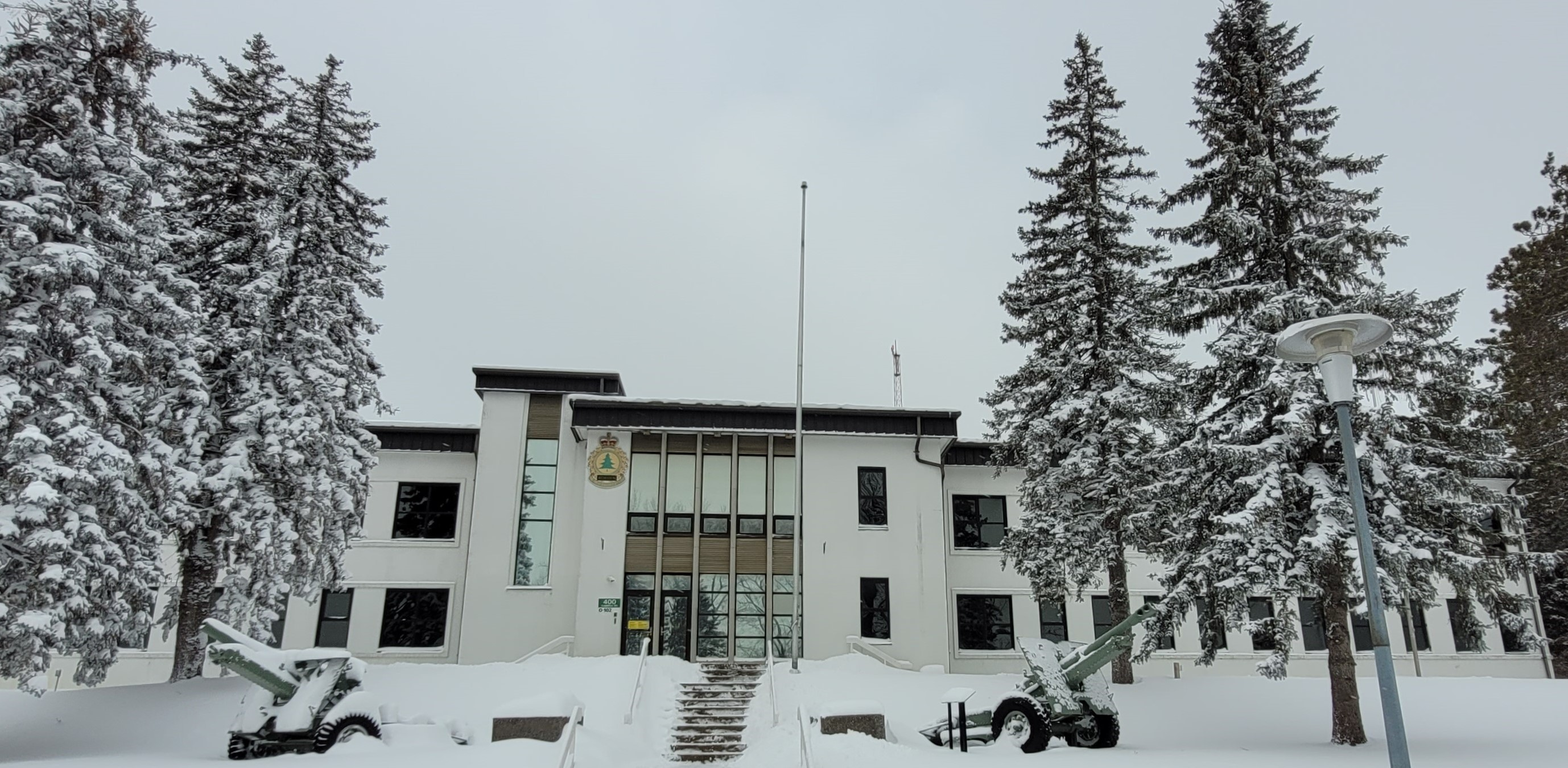
Building O 102

The Building O-102 at CFB Borden was recognized as a federal heritage building in 1995. Constructed in 1948 to plans prepared in 1945, Building O-102 is associated with the massive construction and modernization program undertaken by the Department of National Defence at the end of the Second World War.

== Architecture ==
CFB Borden has several federal heritage buildings on the Register of the Government of Canada Heritage Buildings:

- Alexander Dunn Public School P-148 recognized - 1995
- Barrie Armoury recognized - 1997
- Croil Hall Building A-142 recognized - 2003
- Dyte Hall A-78 recognized - 1995
- Hangars 3, 5, 6, 7, 10, 11, 12 and 13 classified - 1988
- Headquarters Building O-102 recognized - 1995
- Hennessy Block Building S-136 recognized - 1995
- Junior Ranks Quarters T-114 and T-115 Recognized - 1995
- Maple Mess A-74 recognized - 1995
- Museum Building E-108 recognized - 1995
- Non Commissioned Officer Building O-109 recognized - 1995

== Education ==
CFB Borden has two French-language elementary schools on-post. Conseil scolaire Viamonde, a French-language secular public school board, operates Académie La Pinède on-post. Conseil scolaire catholique MonAvenir, a French-language Catholic public school board, operates École élémentaire catholique Marguerite-Bourgeois on-post.

Simcoe County District School Board, an English-language secular public school board, operates the following zoned schools that cover on-post housing:

- Angus Morrison Elementary School in Angus
- Nottawasaga Pines Secondary School in Angus

Simcoe Muskoka Catholic District School Board, an English-language Catholic public school board, operates the following zoned schools that cover on-post housing:

- Our Lady of Grace Catholic Elementary School in Angus
- St. Joan of Arc Catholic High School in Barrie

CS Viamonde operates École secondaire Roméo-Dallaire in Barrie. MonAvenir operates École secondaire catholique Nouvelle-Alliance, which has an attendance boundary that covers the base, in Barrie.

=== History of education ===
The CFB Borden Board of Education (French: Conseil scolaire de la BFC Borden) previously operated public primary and secondary schools on base for dependent children. The schools were named after people who had been awarded the Victoria Cross.

- Alexander Dunn Public School (French: École publique Alexander Dunn)
- Frederick Campbell VC School (French: École Frédérick Campbell VC) (Building 0-113)
  - It began operations in 1956 and ended operations in 2010. The building was razed circa 2013.
- Base Borden Collegiate Institute (French: École secondaire Base Borden)

== See also ==
- Nottawasaga River Rats
- Ontario Highway 90
- Ontario Highway 131
- Emergency Government Headquarters
