= Canadian Forces School of Aerospace Technology and Engineering =

Canadian Armed Forces training establishment in Ontario

The Canadian Forces School of Aerospace Technology and Engineering (CFSATE) is a Canadian Armed Forces training establishment for Aerospace Engineering Officers and Aircraft Technicians who serve with units of the Royal Canadian Air Force.

CFSATE is a unit of 16 Wing, located at CFB Borden in central Ontario, Canada.
