= RCAF Detachment Alliston =

Former military airfield in Ontario

- Canada

Site information
- Owner: Department of National Defence
- Operator: Royal Canadian Air Force

Location
- Location within Ontario

Airfield information
- Elevation: 725 ft (221 m) AMSL
Runways
Direction	Length and surface
15/33	2,950 ft (900 m) turf
9/27	2,900 ft (880 m) turf
3/21	2,950 ft (900 m) turf

Royal Canadian Air Force Detachment Alliston was opened in July 1940 near the village of Alliston, Ontario (Lots 6, 7 & 8, Concession 11, Tecumseth Twp.). This small aerodrome served as the No. 2 Relief Landing Field for No. 1 Service Flying Training School of the British Commonwealth Air Training Plan, located at RCAF Station Camp Borden. The airfield at RCAF Detachment Alliston consisted of three runways in a standard triangular pattern, but unlike the RCAF Detachment Edenvale, they were compressed grass runways and there were no lights for night landings. The airfield was abandoned at the end of World War II and the land was sold for farmland.

== Aerodrome ==
In approximately 1943 the aerodrome was listed at 44°07′N 79°49′W with a variation of 8 degrees west and elevation of 725 ft (221 m). The field was listed as an "all-way turfed field" and had three runways listed as follows:

Runway name	Length	Width	Surface
15/33	2,950 ft (900 m)	1,000 ft (300 m)	Turf
9/27	2,900 ft (880 m)	1,000 ft (300 m)	Turf
3/21	2,950 ft (900 m)	1,000 ft (300 m)	Turf

Today, not the slightest trace remains of RCAF Detachment Alliston.
