= Nantyr Shores Secondary School =

Location
- 1146 Anna Maria Ave; Innisfil, Ontario, L9S 1W2; Canada; 44°18′20″N 79°33′20″W

Information
- Funding type: Public
- Founded: 2000
- School board: Simcoe County District School Board
- School number: 927724
- Principal: Brian MacIsaac
- Grades: 9-12
- Enrollment: 1360 (2020–21)
- Colours: Teal, gold and black
- Website: nss.scdsb.on.ca

Nantyr Shores Secondary School is a public secondary school (grades 9-12) located in the community of Alcona in the Town of Innisfil, Ontario, Canada. It is part of the Simcoe County District School Board and has an enrollment of about 1360 students. The principal of the school is Brian MacIsaac.

The superintendent of the school is Lisa Coffey. (Area 3b schools- South Barrie & Innisfil).

== History ==
Nantyr Shores Secondary School in Alcona opened in 2001 as the only three-storey school in Simcoe County.

== Ranking ==
The Fraser Institute Report Card on Secondary Schools gives Nantyr Shores the following ranking:

Fraser Institute ranking
Report	Current	Last Five Years
2013	557/725	580/691
2016	338/747	453/623
2017	390/738	416/625

== The Tritons ==
Nantyr Shores has a Triton as their mascot, nicknamed Regan. It was named this after a former vice-principal at Nantyr died of cancer. The mascot is represented as an aqua-type man with blonde hair and bare chest, as well as gold and teal pants. The mascot was purchased by the 2005-2006 Nantyr Shores Student Council.

== Athletics ==
- Baseball
- Basketball
- Cross country
- Curling
- Dance Team
- Flag football and Football
- Golf
- Hockey
- Rugby
- Soccer
- Swimming
- Track and field
- Volleyball
- Wrestling

== Events and projects ==
=== Spin 4 Kids ===
Spin 4 Kids was an annual event that took place at Nantyr Shores. This event is to raise money not only for Nantyr's sports teams and clubs but the Royal Victorian Hospitals Cancer Care Center. Spin 4 Kids consisted of over 50 riders at a time pedalling on exercise bikes for 12 hours, live entertainment, a Hallway of Achievement, silent auction, and plenty of refreshments. This event is put together mostly by students. From 2005 to 2008 the event raised over $18,000 for the RVH Cancer Care Centre, and approximately $68,000 for Nantyr's sports teams and clubs. The event is no longer run.

=== Green Tie Gala Project ===
The Gala Project was an initiative set up by the ECOS Club and Challenge and Change class at Nantyr Shores to fund the future project of the placement of solar panels on top of the school's roof. The event was to help raise funds for the project and is supported by the community, local business, as well as the staff and students at Nantyr Shores.

The third annual Green Tie Gala that took place in 2012 earned approximately $3500.

Since, Nantyr Shores Secondary School has raised the $30,000 required and now has an array of solar panels on its roof.

== In the news ==
Nantyr Shores Secondary School has been talked about on national TV on two separate occasions.

The first taking place in 2013, after YouTube Video "Hallway Swimming" went viral, afterwards making appearances on talk shows such as The Ellen DeGeneres Show.

The second event took place in June 2017, when Nantyr had a transgender prom king, who won the title of Prom King after a joke by their friend took off.

== See also ==
- Education in Ontario
- List of secondary schools in Ontario
