= Thornton, Ontario =

Thornton
- Unincorporated place
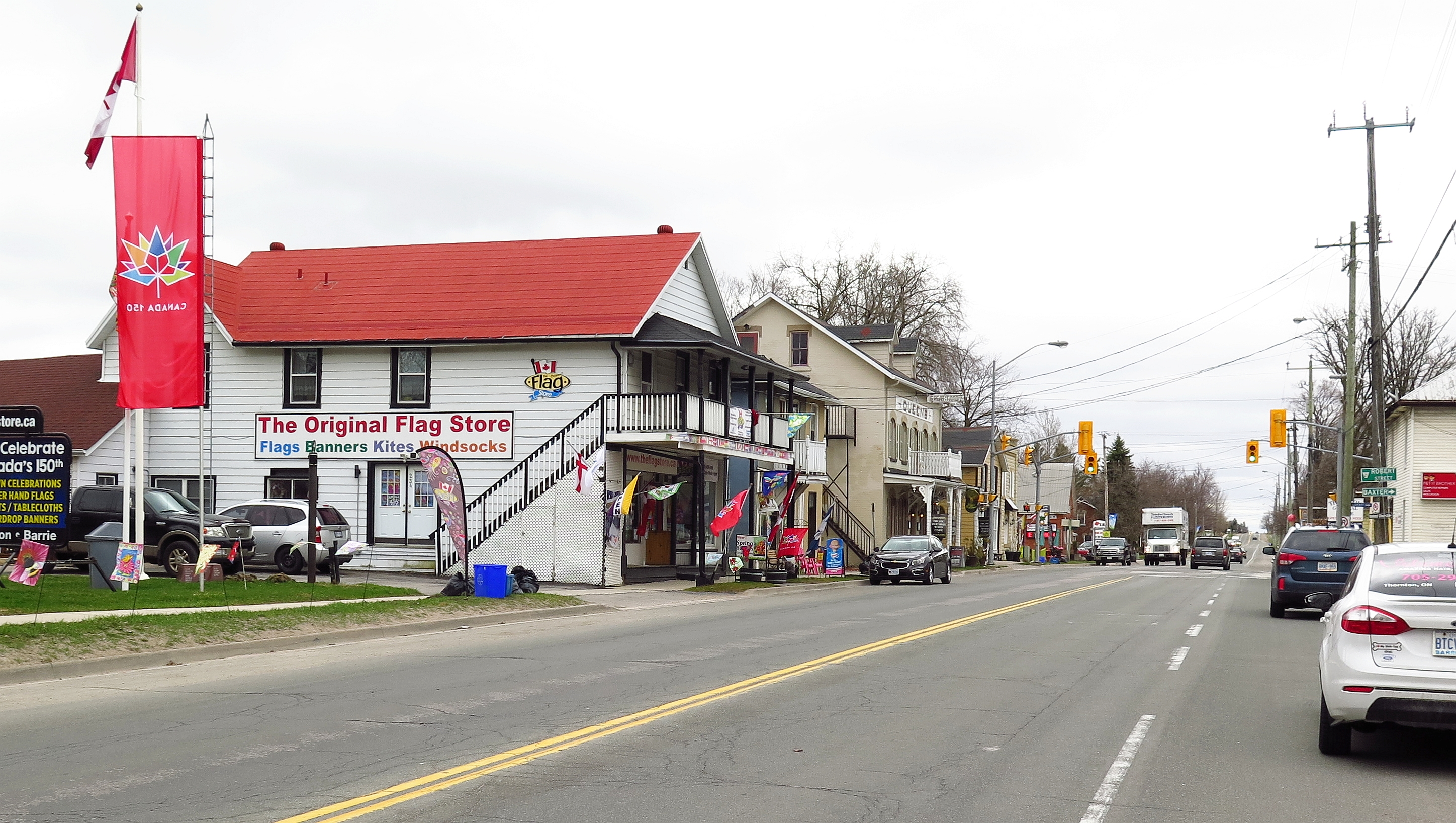
- Barrie Street in Thornton

- Location within Canada Location within Ontario
- Coordinates: 44°16′14″N 79°43′23″W
- Country: Canada
- Province: Ontario
- County: Simcoe
- Township: Essa
- Time zone: UTC-5 (Eastern (EST))
  - Summer (DST): UTC-4 (EDT)
- GNBC Code: FCWAL

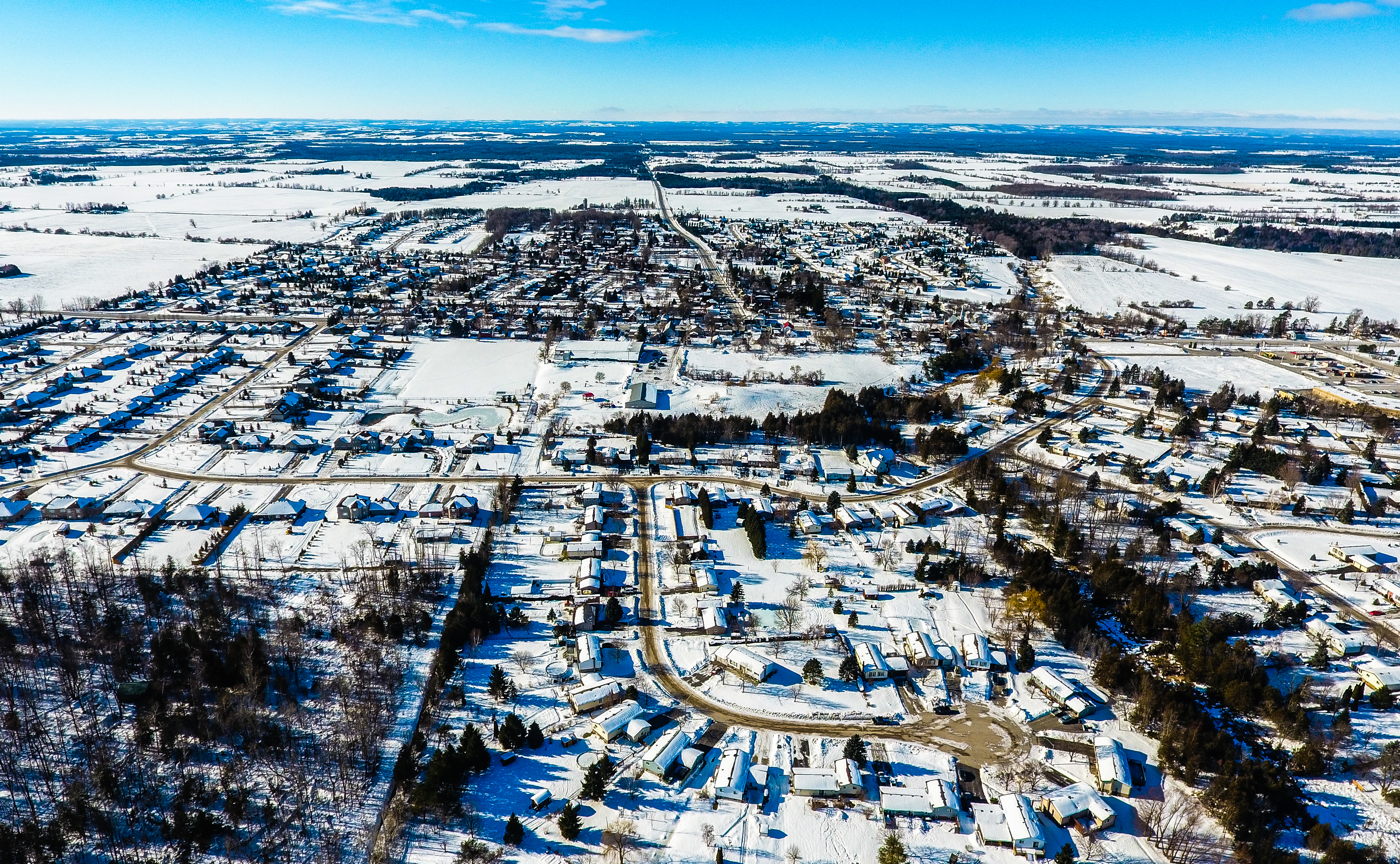
Aerial view of Thornton

Thornton is an unincorporated place in Essa Township, Simcoe County, Ontario, Canada. It had a population of 1,046 as of the 2021 Census. It is 74 kilometres (46 mi) north of Toronto.

== History ==
The town of Thornton developed during the 1820s, and in 1833 was established as Henrysville (or Henry's Corners) after early settler John Henry, who was the first teacher and then the schoolmaster, and later became the postmaster when an office opened in 1854. The name Henrysville caused confusion in the mail system at the time, so the community became Thornton in 1854 after Henry Thornton, who owned a grist mill, saw mill and planning mill.

=== Recent history ===
Thornton has had two subdivisions built within the hamlet in the last 10 years. As of January 2019, there is a new residential subdivision of estate homes currently under development on the west side of Hwy. 27 (Barrie Street). The Thornton Crossing Plaza has also been built with a variety of businesses including the Thornton Post Office and a few private businesses.

== Geography ==
Thornton is located on generally flat and fertile soils about 9 kilometres (5.6 mi) north of Cookstown, Ontario, and 5 kilometres (3.1 mi) south of Barrie, Ontario. The Trans Canada Trail runs through Thornton and the intersection of Country Road 21 and County Road 27 marks the core of the hamlet of Thornton.

== Attractions ==
- The fire station in Thornton is run by volunteers and is a municipal service that provides help in emergency situations, education about fire prevention, and fire permits. The fire station building is shared with Essa Public Library.
- The Essa Public Library was founded in December 1996. It also has a meeting room for community events and activities and provides internet access to its clients.
- Thornton Arena is where the Thornton Tigers play, a minor hockey league team.
