= Barrie Central Collegiate Institute =

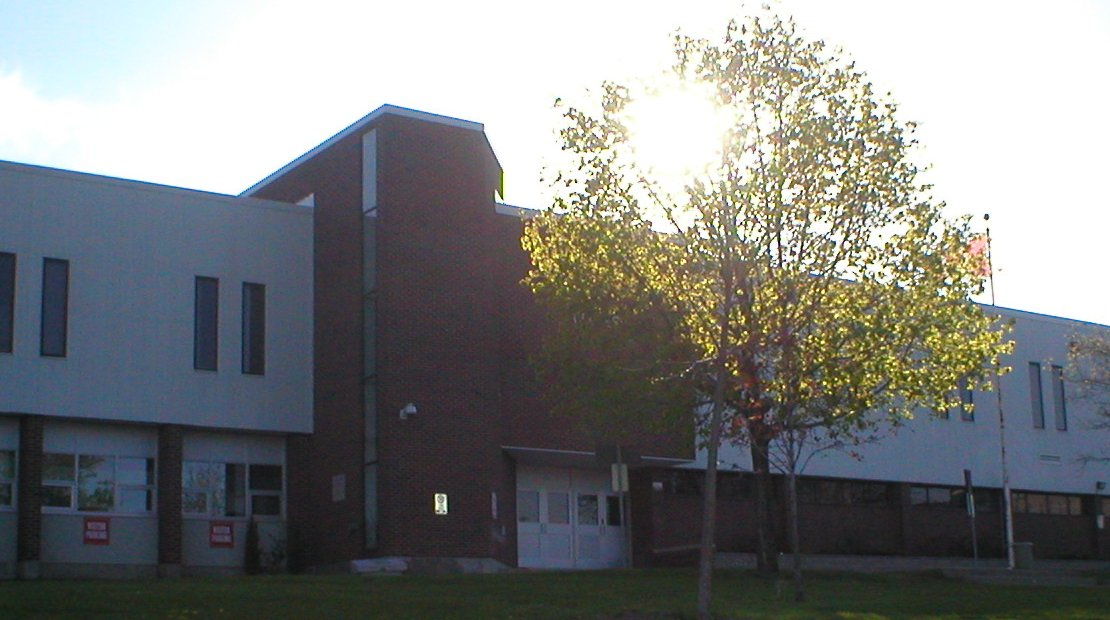

Location
- 125 Dunlop Street West; Barrie, Ontario, L4N 1A9; Canada
- 44°23′10″N 79°41′42″W

Information
- School type: Public, high school
- Founded: 1843
- Closed: June, 2016
- School board: Simcoe County District School Board
- School number: 893196
- Grades: 9-12
- Language: English
- Colours: Black, Cerise and Ivory
- Team name: Barrie Central Phoenix
- Website: cen.scdsb.on.ca

Barrie Central Collegiate Institute was a public secondary school (Grades 9-12+) located in Barrie, Ontario, Canada. It was the oldest secondary school in Simcoe County. The school provided a variety of curricular and extracurricular activities, including rugby teams, classics club, and Sears Drama Festival. Barrie Central was also one of two schools in Simcoe County that offered an Extended French program.

== History ==
Barrie Central Collegiate Institute was founded in 1843.

Barrie Central's Concert Band was founded in 1923. In 1923, construction began on a new school building; when the new much larger building reopened in 1933, the school's first Student Council was set up.

The school was closed in June 2016. The last principal was Greg Brucker.

== Barrie Central Concert Band ==
Barrie Central's Concert Band was founded in 1923 by W. Allen Fisher (1905–1989, a teacher 1931-1972 of English and History, Honorary LL D Queen's 1972, Member of the Order of Canada 1973). The band gained a reputation as one of Canada's leading school bands, touring extensively in Canada, the US and Europe, and winning over 100 first prizes in competitions such as those at the World Music Festival in Kerkrade, Netherlands, where it placed first in 1970. The band was led 1972-1986 by Morley Calvert, under whom it won more than 25 first and second prizes, including gold medals in Kerkrade in 1974 and 1978 and the Major Brian S. McCool Trophy annually 1974-1966 and in 1978 at the Kiwanis Music Festival in Toronto. In 1975 the band represented Canada at the inaugural International Festival of Youth Brass and Symphonic Bands held in Cardiff, Wales and London, England.

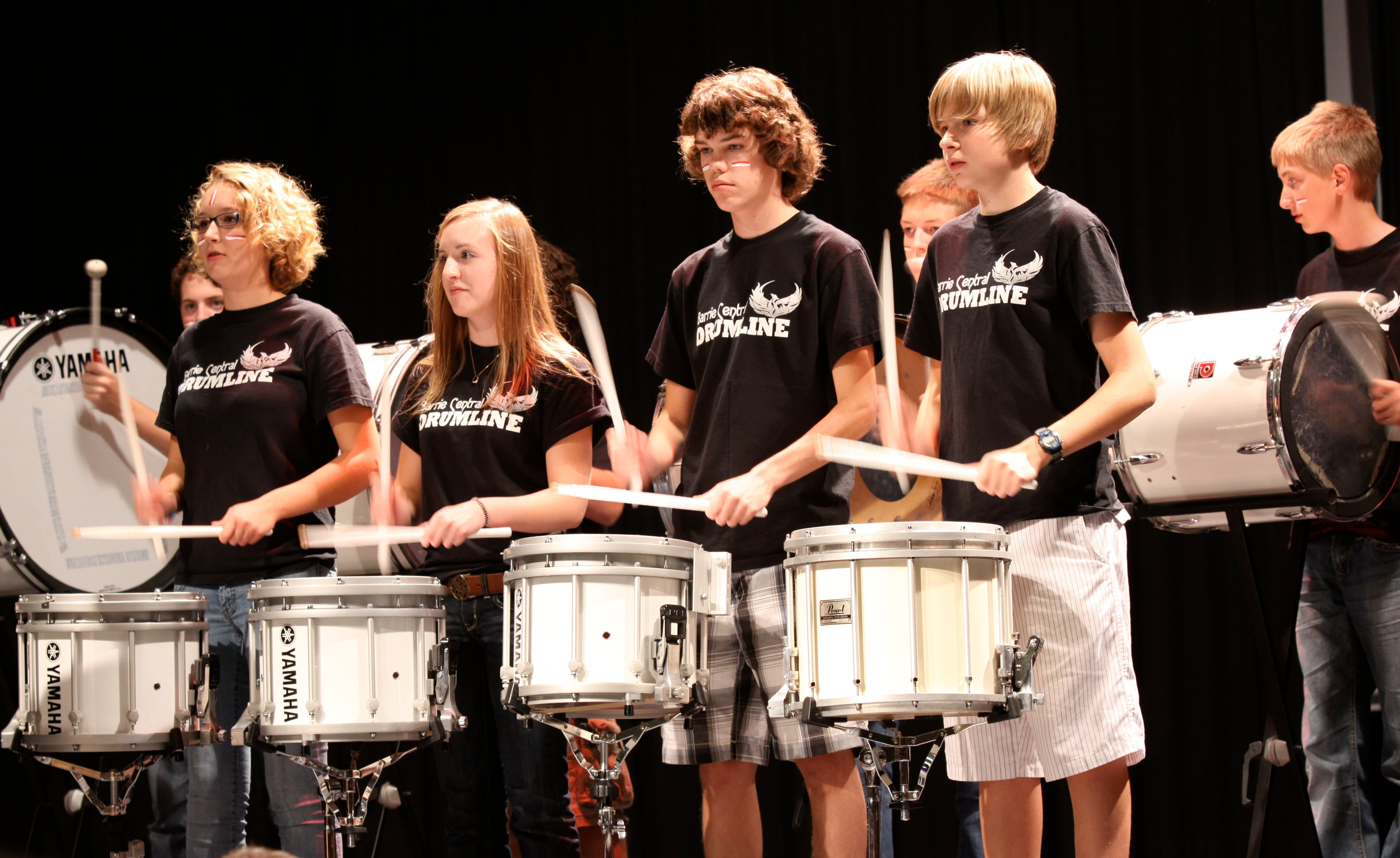
Barrie Central Collegiate Drumline performing at 'Celebrate Central' 2010

Up until its closure, Barrie Central's band and music program was run by Lisa Perry, who led the Senior Concert Band, and Graham Hilliam, who led the Junior Band and Jazz Band. Hilliam and Perry are married. Neil Mavor has spent many years as Pit Orchestra Director for Central's musical productions including Hair, Peter Pan and Les Misérables. Neil is the creator and leader of Barrie Central's Drumline, which originally consisted of about five members. They played at various school events such as sports games, assemblies, and concerts.

== School activities ==
=== Student Council ===
Student Council ran a variety of events to promote school spirit, their most successful event of the year being White Attire (dance). They also hosted spirit weeks year-round with many themed event days, such as: a Halloween Haunted House, ugly sweater day, pajama day, pictures with Santa, the spring dance, grab-a-heart, and fashion show(s). The last Student Council president was grade 11 student Julia Marr.

=== Arts Council ===
Arts Council ran many arts and culture based events, most notably Library Unplugged. Other events included their annual (community) coffee house, BCC's Bucket list, and Dancing With the Teachers

=== Classics Club ===
Since the founding of Central, Latin has been an important part of the curriculum offered within the school. The Latin Club, later called the Classics Club, is one of the oldest clubs at Barrie Central. Little of its early activities is known; in the 1970s it became a participant in the Classics Conference. Under the direction of Helen Spanis and Janet Turner, the Classics Club at Barrie Central won a number of Latin awards at the Classics Conference. The Classics Club became a member of the Ontario Junior Classical League, a student version of the American Classical League in the 1980s, then becoming eligible to participate in Certamen events and other activities sponsored by the association. In 1991, Margaret-Anne Gillis, took over supervision of the Classics Club. The club also organized the annual Grade 9 Parents' Welcome Dinner, assisted with Commencement in June, and decorated for the Excellence Awards. The members also went on field-trips, hosted Saturnalia, and put on semi-formal dance(s) for the school.

=== Other clubs and teams ===
- Social Justice Club
- Gender-Sexuality/Equality Alliance (past Gay-Straight Alliance)
- School Newspaper
- Sears Drama Festival/Musical
- Book Club
- Green Team
- Chess Club and Team
- Improv Club and Team
- Anti-Bullying Bureau

=== Sports teams ===
- Football
- Flag Football
- Volleyball
- Skiing
- Basketball
- Curling
- Golf
- Mountain Biking
- Soccer
- Tennis
- Cross-Country Running
- Badminton
- Swimming
- Wrestling
- Softball
- Rugby
- Track and Field
- Ultimate Frisbee

== Closure ==
In September 2010, a Pupil Accommodation Review Committee (ARC) was initiated to address declining enrollment and facility conditions at Barrie Central. The four Barrie secondary schools were included in the terms of reference for the ARC.

The ARC concluded in May 2011, and the board approved motioned that staff would pursue viable financial partnerships until September 30, 2014. If a viable partner is secured, staff will prepare a capital priority case for the Ministry of Education. In the case that a partner is not found, the school will close as of June 30, 2016 and staff will submit a capital priority case to accommodate students at other Barrie secondary schools. Staff report to the Business and Facilities Standing Committee at least quarterly on the status of partnership discussions, and an attendance area review of the five Barrie secondary schools will commence in October 2014. A public meeting was held in November and two months were provided for comments/feedback.

In November 2012, a joint RFEI between the City of Barrie and the SCDSB was developed and issued, with sixteen responses were received.

In May 2013, a community meeting was held at Barrie Central to provide the school community with more information about the project.

The SCDSB released an RFP for facility partnerships for the development of a new school on the existing Barrie Central Collegiate Institute site, and the potential development of the Barrie Central and Prince of Wales properties in November 2013. This RFP closed as of January 20, 2014, receiving one detailed proposal.

On Wednesday, September 24, 2014, at the Regular Board Meeting of the SCDSB, the Report from Closed Session ratified a previous recommendation made in Closed Session;

"1. That the Board confirms that the requirements of the Request For Proposal, Barrie Central Partnerships issued on November 4, 2013 have not been fulfilled, as set out in Report No. CL-B-2-a, Request for Proposal, Barrie Central Partnerships, dated September 24, 2014.

The board approved the following motion in public session:

1. That the Board approve, if viable financial partnerships including private sector organizations are not secured by September 30, 2014 relating to the shared development and use of a new secondary school on the Barrie Central Collegiate Institute site, staff proceed with a school consolidation capital project business case, in accordance with Ministry Memo 2014: B08 Request for School Consolidation Capital Projects, dated August 27, 2014, for the purpose of accommodating students resulting from the closure of Barrie Central Collegiate Institute, dated September 24, 2014."

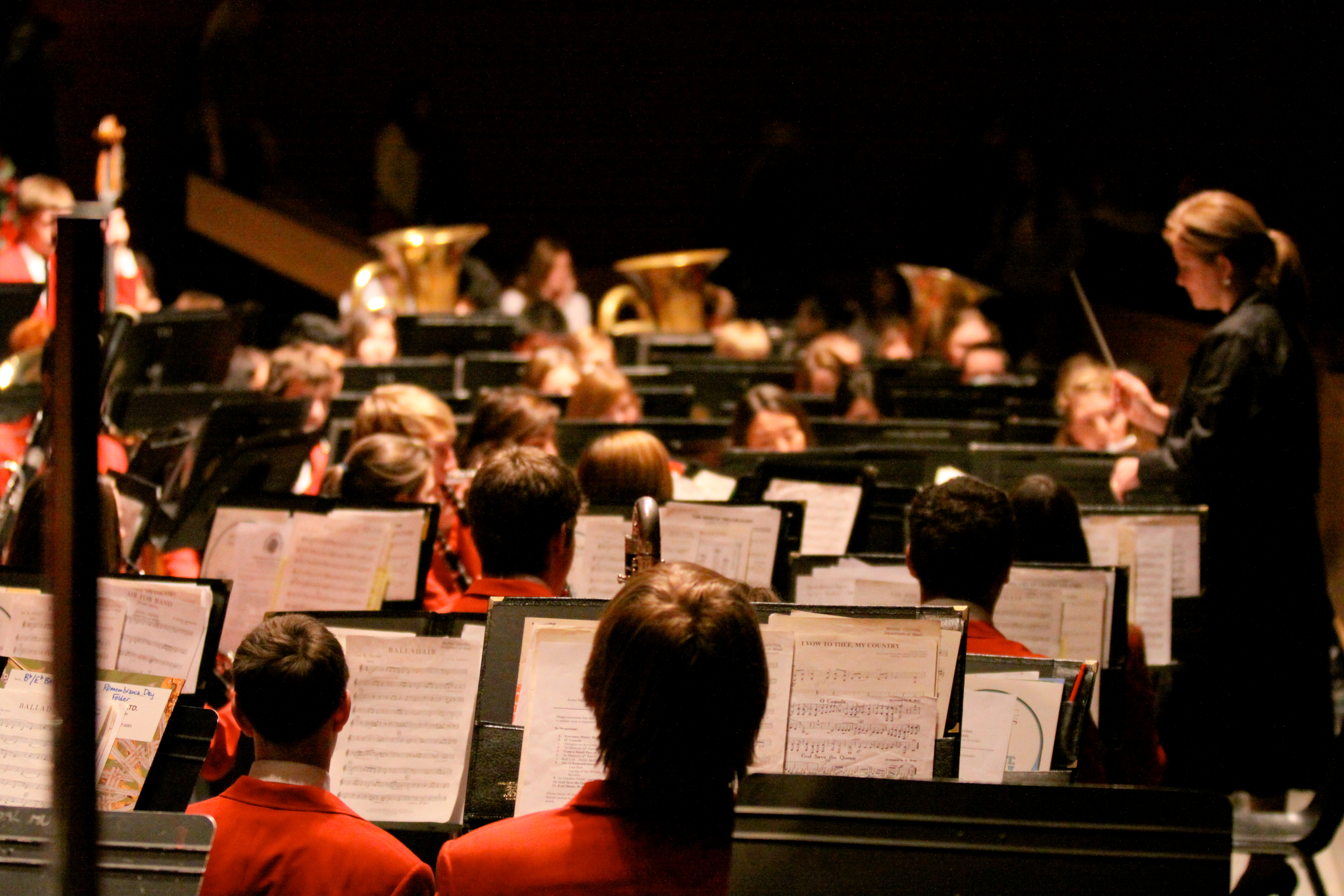
Barrie Central Collegiate Band playing at the 2010 Remembrance Day Ceremony

It was announced on September 25, 2014, that Barrie Central would close following the 2015–2016 school year, effective June 30, 2016. Barrie Central students were dispersed between Innisdale Secondary School and Barrie North Collegiate. The majority of Central's Extended French Program went to Innisdale, while approximately 30 students attended Eastview Secondary School based on the Simcoe County District School Board's Attendance Area Review.

== Notable alumni ==
- Kayla Alexander, WNBA player with Indiana Fever
- Emily Belchos, Canadian Women's 7's Rugby Team 2013–present
- Charles Drury, first Ontario Minister of Agriculture, 1888
- E.C. Drury, Premier of Ontario, 1919-1923
- William Gallie, Professor of Surgery, University of Toronto
- Ron Hoggarth, former NHL Referee 1971-1994
- Afie Jurvanen, Canadian musician - Bahamas
- Janice Laking, Mayor of Barrie 1988-2000
- Jeff Lehman, politician, Barrie Mayor 2010–2022
- Megan Lukan, rugby union player, member of Canada's Women's rugby sevens team
- Steve Myddelton, CFL player
- Taylor Paris, Professional Rugby Player, Canadian Men's 7's and 15's Rugby Player, 2010–present
- Luke Tait, Professional Rugby Player, Former, Canadian Men's 15's Rugby Player, 2005-2011
- Bobbie Rosenfeld, 1928 Olympian (Track and Field)

== See also ==
- List of high schools in Ontario
