= Blackdown Cadet Training Centre =

Cadets Canada training centre at CFB Borden, Ontario

Blackdown Cadet Summer Training Centre is a training centre for Cadets Canada operated by the Department of National Defence, located in CFB Borden, Ontario. Formerly known as the Army Cadet Summer Training Center Blackdown for Royal Canadian Army Cadets, it includes training for the Royal Canadian Air Cadets and Royal Canadian Sea Cadets since 2003.

== Description ==
Blackdown CTC is the largest summer training centre for Canadian Cadet Organizations in Canada, with approximately 2500 cadets each summer enrolled in 2 or 4-week courses, with introductory courses lasting 2 weeks, and Advanced/Instructor courses lasting from. As of 2025, the following courses are available:

- Drill and Ceremonial Instructor Course (Tri-Element) - 4 Weeks
- Intro to Drill and Ceremonial (Tri-Element) - 2 Weeks
- Survival Instructor (Air Cadets) - 4 Weeks
- Intro to Survival (Air Cadets) - 2 Weeks
- Expedition Team Leader (Army Cadets) - 4 weeks
- Expedition Team Member (Army Cadets) - 2 weeks
- Fitness and Sports Instructor (Tri-Element) - 4 Weeks
- Introduction to Fitness and Sports (Tri-Element) - 2 Weeks
- Advanced Aviation (Air Cadets) - 4 Weeks
- Aviation Technology and Aerospace (Air Cadets) - 2 Weeks
- Air Rifle Marksmanship Instructor (Tri-Element) - 4 Weeks
- Introduction to Marksmanship (Tri-Element) - 2 Weeks
- Military Band Musician (Tri-Element) - 4 Weeks
- Pipe Band Musician (Tri-Element) - 4 Weeks
- Introduction to Military Band (Tri-Element) - 2 Weeks
- Introduction to Pipe Band (Tri-Element) - 2 Weeks

Courses are staffed by Staff Cadets, who are seniors cadets employed for the summer, responsible for teaching lessons relevant to the course and are supported by adult civilian instructors, CIC officers, and reservists from 32 Canadian Brigade Group.

== History ==
In the summer of 1943, Army Cadet Camps were organized in eleven locations across Canada for 10 days duration each. In the summer of 1947, the first experimental six-week camp was held at Camp Ipperwash on Lake Huron, North of Sarnia, Ontario. Originally opened on 28 January 1942 as A29 Canadian Infantry Training Centre.

Although A29 CITC ceased operations in 1945, the camp remained open as a training centre for the Regular Force, Reserves. In 1946, the camp was used as a two-week summer camp for army cadets, as an experiment. It was a success and as a result was expanded in 1947 as the summer home of the Central Command Cadet Camp. Cadets attended Basic Training, Signalling, Driver-Mechanics, and Senior Leaders courses.

In 1948, the camp was further expanded and paved the way for similar camps in Dundurn, Vernon and Aldershot in the late 1940s and early 50s.

In 1994, because of a First Nation land claim, the Ipperwash Army Cadet Camp moved to Canadian Forces Base Borden, and was renamed the Blackdown Army Cadet Summer Training Centre.

The first Commanding Officer of this new Cadet Training Centre was LCol Dirk in 1994. Since then, Blackdown has continued to evolve both in the range of courses offered and the facilities themselves. Cadet sleeping quarters are modular tents with metal bunk beds.

In 2003, the first of many tri-force courses arrived in Blackdown Cadet Summer Training Centre; followed was the closure of the Borden Air Cadet Camp.

In 2012, the training centre saw 179 adult staff members, 193 Staff Cadets and 1819 Course Cadets enter the gates.
