= Steve Myddelton =

Canadian football player (born 1986)

Profile
- Position: Offensive lineman

Personal information
- Born: July 27, 1986 (age 40); Barrie, Ontario, Canada
- Listed height: 6 ft 3 in (1.91 m)
- Listed weight: 305 lb (138 kg)

Career information
- High school: Barrie Central
- University: St. Francis Xavier
- CFL draft: 2009: 4th round, 30th overall pick

Career history
- 2009–2013: Calgary Stampeders
- 2013: BC Lions
- 2014: Hamilton Tiger-Cats
- 2014: Edmonton Eskimos
- Stats at CFL.ca

Steve Myddelton (born July 27, 1986) is a retired professional Canadian football offensive lineman. He was drafted by the Calgary Stampeders in the fourth round of the 2009 CFL draft and played for parts of five seasons for that team before being traded to the BC Lions on August 5, 2013. He played CIS football for the St. Francis Xavier X-Men.
