= Jake Julien =

Canadian gridiron football player (born 1998)

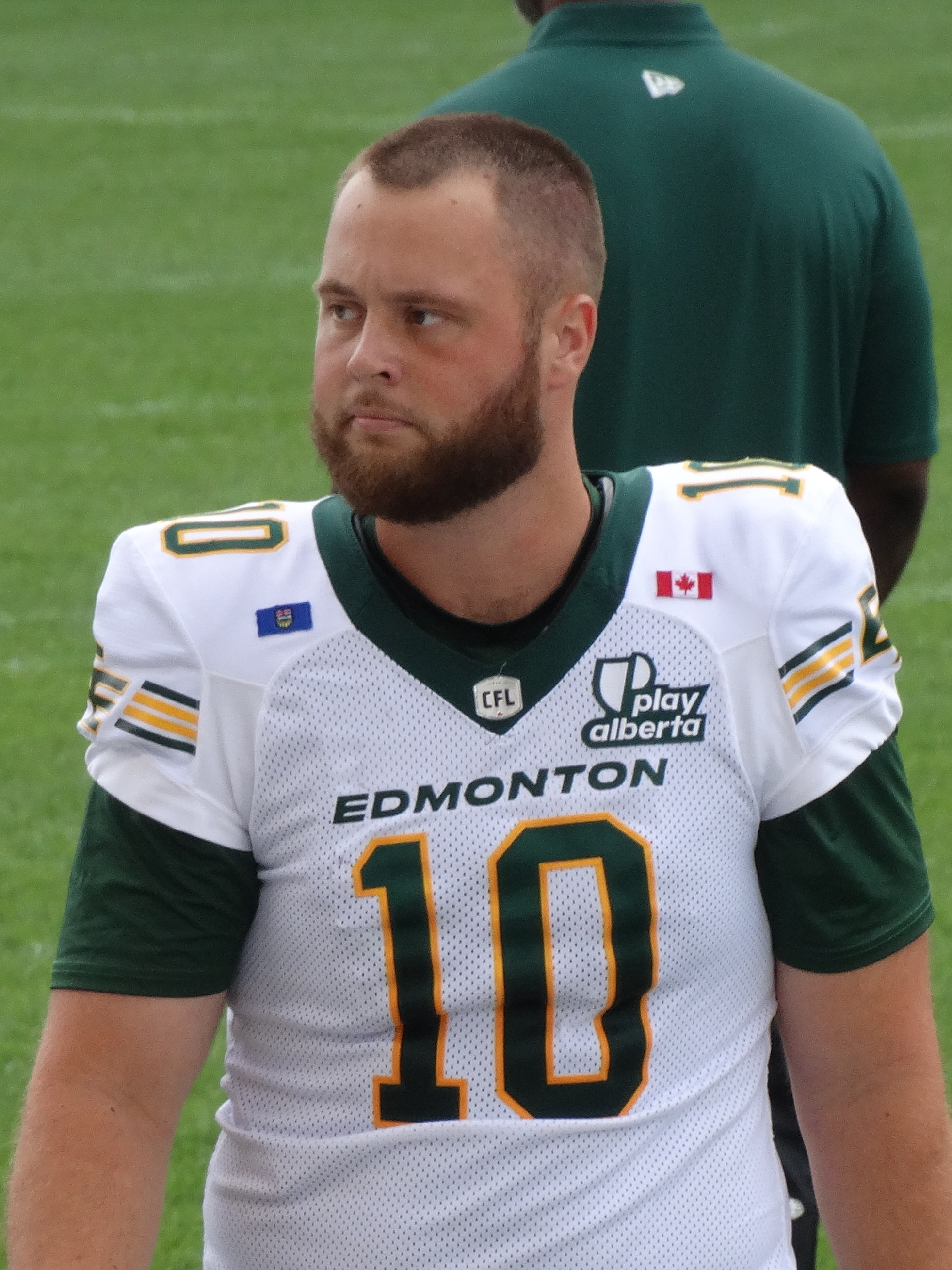
- Julien with the Edmonton Elks in 2025

No. 10 – Edmonton Elks
- Position: Punter
- Roster status: Active
- CFL status: National

Personal information
- Born: November 10, 1998 (age 28); Barrie, Ontario, Canada
- Listed height: 6 ft 1 in (1.85 m)
- Listed weight: 227 lb (103 kg)

Career information
- High school: Barrie North Collegiate
- College: Eastern Michigan
- CFL draft: 2021: 4th round, 31st overall pick

Career history
- New England Patriots (2022)*; Ottawa Redblacks (2023)*; Edmonton Elks (2023–2024); Tampa Bay Buccaneers (2025)*; Edmonton Elks (2025–present)
- * Offseason or practice squad member only

Awards and highlights
- Grey Cup champion (2026); CFL All-Star (2024); 2x CFL West All Star (2024, 2026)
- Stats at CFL.ca

Jacob Christopher Julien (born November 10, 1998) is a Canadian professional football punter for the Edmonton Elks of the Canadian Football League (CFL). He played college football for the Eastern Michigan Eagles and has been a member of the New England Patriots, and Ottawa Redblacks.

== Early life ==
Julien was born on November 10, 1998, in Barrie, Ontario. He attended Barrie North Collegiate Institute and was a soccer and rugby player until Grade 11. He had noticed some of the football players attempting to make 50-yard field goals in practice and tried it out himself. He was able to successfully convert them and the football coach suggested he play for the team. Julien played two years for the football team and helped them win a conference championship while playing placekicker and punter, earning offensive most valuable player honors as a senior. He attended Kohl's kicking camps and was given a five-star rating as a punter. He also earned most valuable player honors in soccer and rugby.

== College career ==
During his final year of high school, Julien intended on accepting an offer to play U Sports football for the York Lions. He then got an offer to play as a walk-on for the Eastern Michigan Eagles in the NCAA's Division I FBS, which he accepted. He saw immediate playing time as a true freshman in 2017, appearing in nine games while punting 33 times for 1,407 yards. The following year, he was named second-team All-Mid-American Conference (MAC) after punting 71 times for 3,078 yards. He was a nominee for the Ray Guy Award for best punter nationally and additionally was named the MAC Special Teams Player of the Week five times, the all-time single-season record for the Eagles.

In 2019, Julien again earned second-team All-MAC honors. He earned second-team All-MAC honors for a third time in 2020 while also being a nominee for the Ray Guy Award, leading the conference and placing eighth nationally with a 44.25 punt average. Julien was selected in the fourth round (31st overall) of the 2021 CFL draft by the Ottawa Redblacks, but chose to return for a final year of college football due to the NCAA giving all players an extra season of eligibility because of the COVID-19 pandemic. In his final season, he punted 51 times for 2,343 yards, averaging 45.9 yards per punt. Julien finished his stint at Eastern Michigan with a career average of 43.4 yards per punt in 54 games, tied for the highest all-time, additionally ranking eighth in school history for total punting yards (7,383).

== Professional career ==
Pre-draft measurables
Height	Weight	Arm length	Hand span	Wingspan
6 ft 1 1/2 in (1.87 m)	227 lb (103 kg)	29 1/2 in (0.75 m)	9 1/4 in (0.23 m)	6 ft 0 3/4 in (1.85 m)
All values from Pro Day

=== New England Patriots ===
After going unselected in the 2022 NFL draft, Julien was signed by the New England Patriots as an undrafted free agent. He competed with Jake Bailey for the punting job but was ultimately released on August 16. While a free agent, he tried out with the New York Jets in September and later with the Patriots in October.

=== Ottawa Redblacks ===
Julien was signed by the Ottawa Redblacks of the Canadian Football League (CFL), who had drafted him in 2021, on May 11, 2023. He was released at the final roster cutdowns on June 3, 2023.

=== Edmonton Elks (first stint) ===
On June 3, 2023, Julien was signed by the Edmonton Elks to be their starting punter. He turned in an outstanding 2024 season, taking home division and league-wide honors for the punter position, and winning an overtime game by punting a tie-breaking rouge.

=== Tampa Bay Buccaneers ===
On January 21, 2025, Julien signed a reserve/future contract with the Tampa Bay Buccaneers. He was waived on August 5.

=== Edmonton Elks (second stint) ===
It was announced on August 27, 2025, that Julien had re-signed with the Edmonton Elks.
