= Twin Lakes Secondary School =

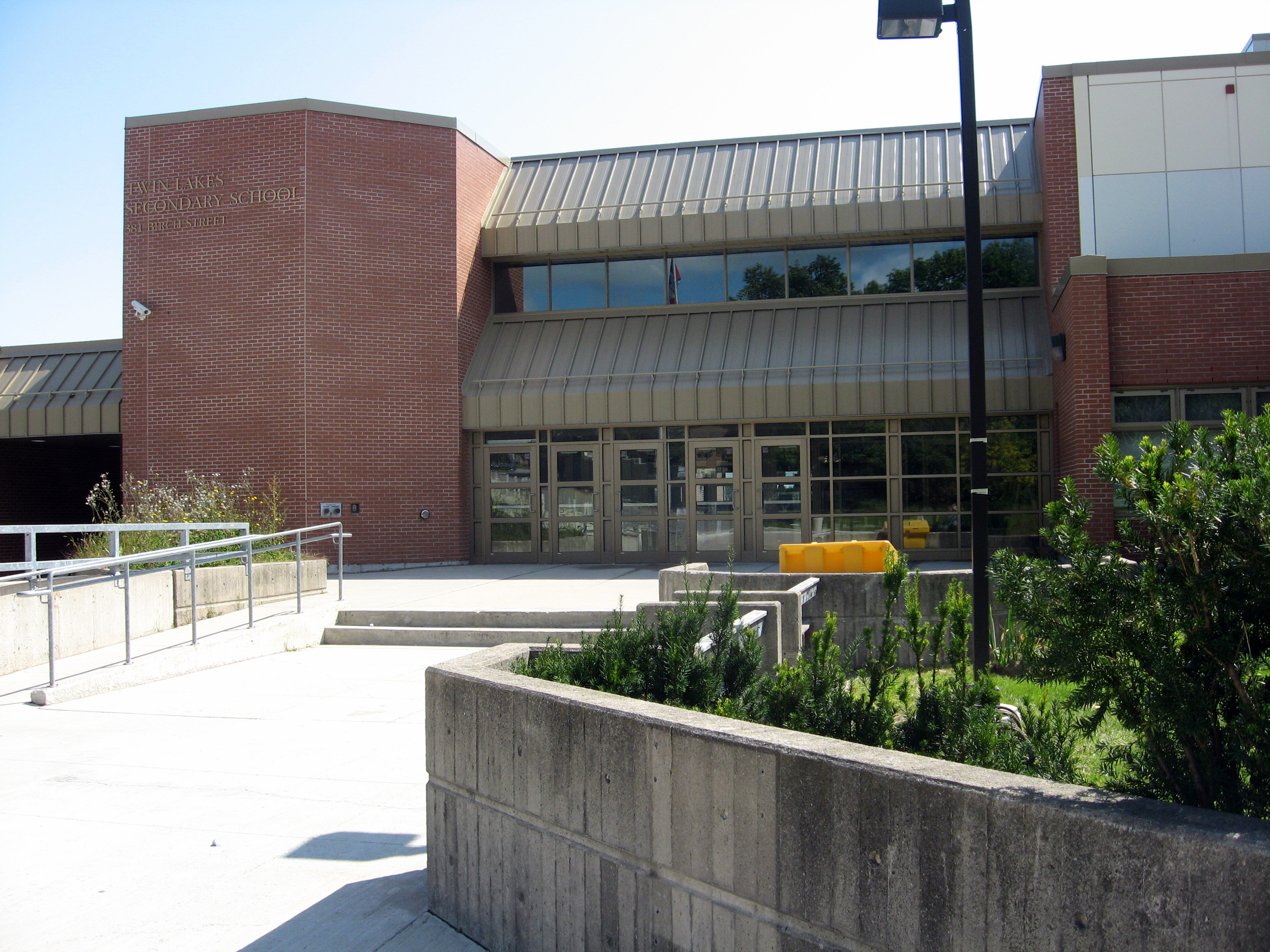

Location
- 381 Birch Street; Orillia, Ontario, L3V 6G5; Canada

Information
- School type: Public, high school
- Motto: Strength in Knowledge
- Established: 1972
- School board: Simcoe County District School Board
- Superintendent: Scott Young
- Principal: Tammy Rodaro
- Grades: 9-12
- Enrollment: 850 (2024)
- Language: English
- Colours: Blue, Green, and Silver
- Team name: Thunderbirds
- Feeder schools: Brechin Public, Regent Park, Harriett Todd, Uptergrove, Rama Central, Guthrie Public School, East Oro
- Website: twi.scdsb.on.ca

Twin Lakes Secondary School (also known as TLSS or Twin) is a secondary school in Orillia, Ontario. It was established in 1972.

Twin Lakes is one of Orillia's 3 secondary schools. The principal is Tammy Rodaro. The superintendent of the school is Scott Young.

== Programs ==
TLSS has:Extended French, Life and Skills courses, Co-operative education programs, Music, art and drama programs, Transportation, construction, yearbook, and computer technology.

== Sport ==
- Boys'/Girls' Soccer
- Boys'/Girls' Rugby
- Boys'/Girls' Hockey
- Boys'/Girls' Basketball
- Boys'/Girls' Volleyball
- Track & Field, Girls' Flag Football
- Nordic Skiing, Swim Team

== incidents ==
On May 7, 2019 the Ontario Provincial Police were called to the school shortly after 9AM to assist with a threat to the school. it was placed on lockdown after a student reported seeing two adult males inside the school. One of those males was reported to have had a firearm. Police conducted a thorough investigation and have determined that there was never a threat to public safety.

On April 24, 2023 police officers responded to the school because Twin Lakes staff called police that a lockdown drill announcement has been initiated. Initial information was that it could be a malfunction of the system. Officers arrived at the school to ensure there was no threat to students or staff. The lockdown was lifted soon after.

== See also ==
- Education in Ontario
- List of secondary schools in Ontario
