= Bradford District High School =

Location
- 70 Professor Day Drive; Bradford, Ontario, L3Z 2A3; Canada
- Coordinates: 44.1123°N 79.581°W

Information
- School type: Public High school
- Founded: 1857
- School board: Simcoe County District School Board
- Superintendent: John Playford
- Principal: Heather Lagace
- Grades: 9 to 12
- Enrollment: 1220 (2020–21)
- Language: English
- Colours: Navy Blue and White
- Mascot: Bucky
- Team name: Buccaneers
- Website: bdh.scdsb.on.ca

Bradford District High School is a public, English-language secondary school located in Bradford, Ontario. It is managed by the Simcoe County District School Board. The principal is Heather Lagace. The school has an enrollment of about 1,100. During the last half of the 2006–2007 school year BDHS underwent extensive renovations that included a new greenhouse and full expansion and renovation of existing facilities.

The school offers a construction-oriented apprenticeship program offering students to learn about hands-on labour and the real experiences of working in that field.

BDHS serves the town of Bradford West Gwillimbury and portions of Innisfil. Elementary feeder schools include:

- Chris Hadfield Public School
- Cookstown Central Public School
- Fieldcrest Elementary School
- Fred C. Cook Public School
- Harvest Hills Public School
- Honorable Earl Rowe Public School
- Marshview Public School
- Harvest Hills Public School
- Sir William Osler Public School
- WH Day Elementary School

== See also ==
- Education in Ontario
- List of secondary schools in Ontario
