= Essa, Ontario =

Essa
- Township (lower-tier)
- Township of Essa
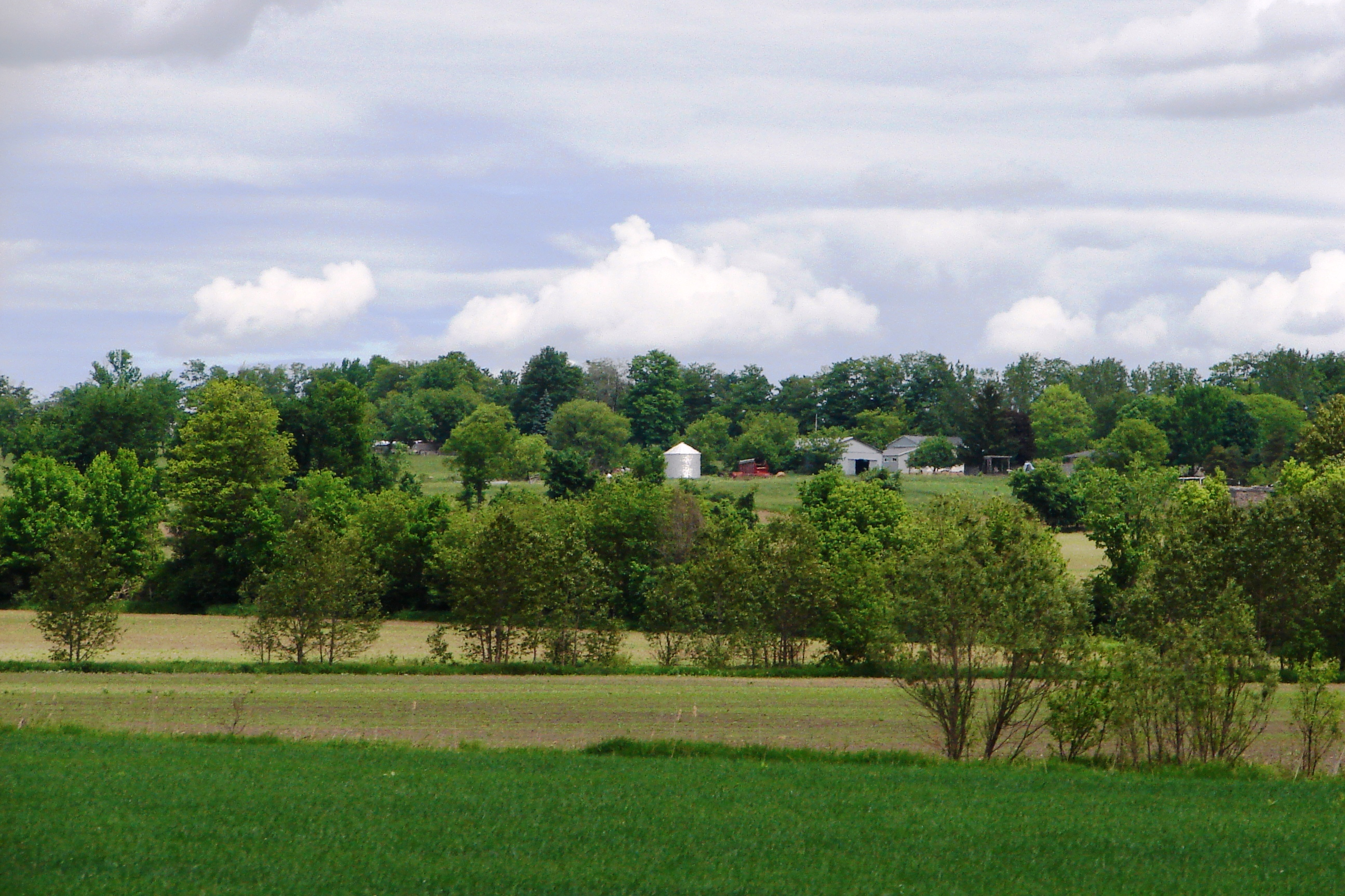
- Motto: Where Town and Country Meet
- Location within Simcoe County Location within Southern Ontario
- Coordinates: 44°15′N 79°47′W
- Country: Canada
- Province: Ontario
- County: Simcoe
- Incorporated: January 1, 1850

Government
  - Mayor: Sandie MacDonald
  - Deputy Mayor: Michael Smith
  - MPs: Terry Dowdall
  - MPPs: Brian Saunderson

Area
  - Land: 279.92 km^{2} (108.08 sq mi)

Population (2021)
  - Total: 22,970
  - Density: 82.1/km^{2} (213/sq mi)
- Time zone: UTC-5 (Eastern (EST))
  - Summer (DST): UTC-4 (EDT)
- Area codes: 705, 249
- Website: www.essatownship.on.ca

Essa is a township in Ontario, Canada, west and south of the city of Barrie in Simcoe County. It is bounded by County Road 90 to its north, County Road 27 to its east, and Ontario Highway 89 to its south. The township is about 100 kilometres (62 mi) from Toronto. The township is well known for its agriculture industry, particularly potato farming. Nearby CFB Borden brings a strong military presence to the area as well, including a high number of Francophone families.

Essa Township was incorporated on January 1, 1850. On January 1, 1991, Essa and Thornton Police Village were merged into the new Township of Essa.

== Geography ==
=== Communities ===
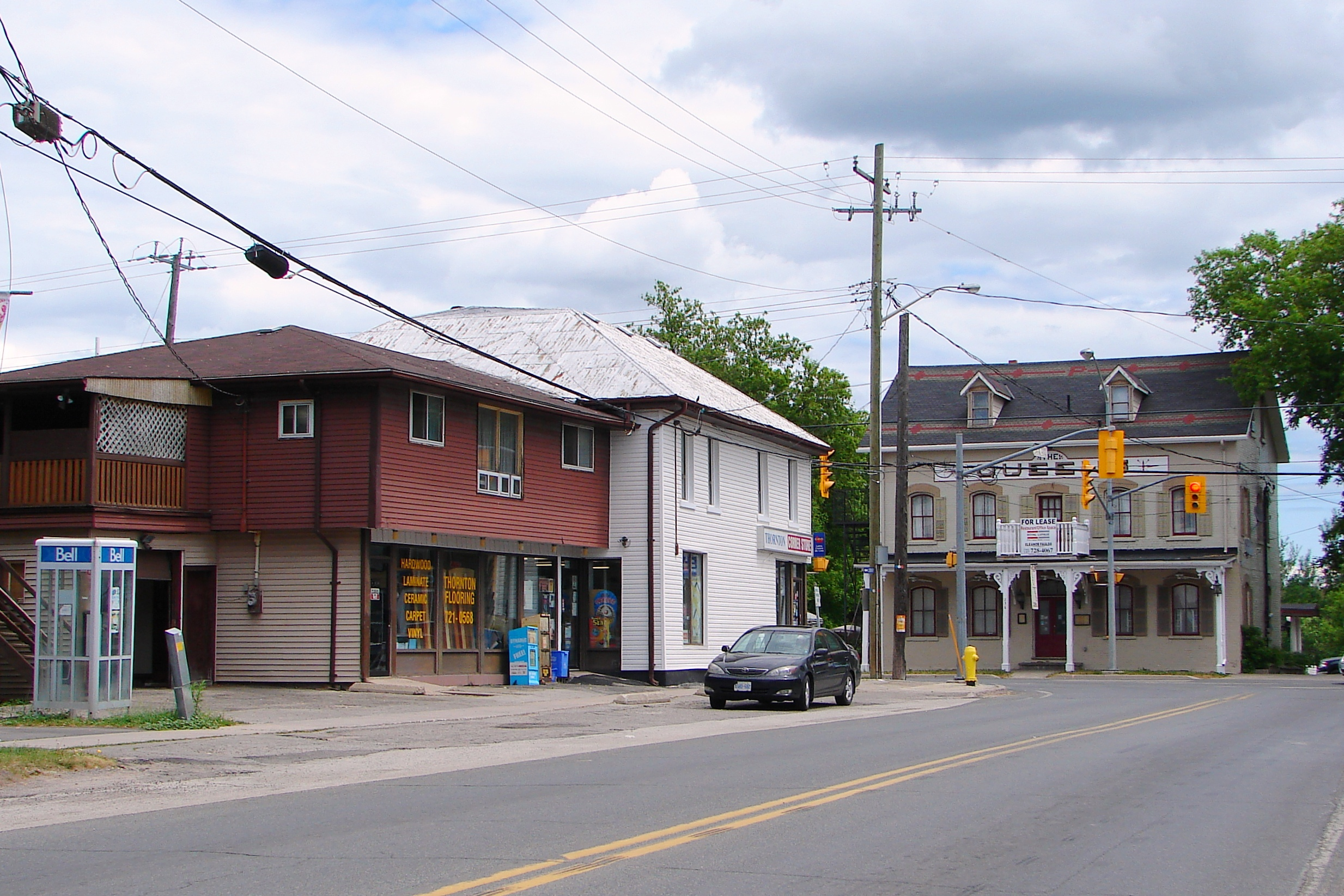
Thornton

The main communities of this township are Angus, Thornton, and Baxter. Other small hamlets are Cedargrove, Colwell, Egbert, Elmgrove, Hoe Doe Valley, Ivy, Utopia and West Essa.

Angus is the largest community in Essa Township, and the main access to the neighbouring Canadian Forces Base Borden. It offers services such as Essa Public Library, catholic and public elementary schools, public secondary school, a small shopping centre, many stores, a chamber of commerce and a recreation facility. Angus is located in the northwestern corner of Essa township. Located in Essa's municipal Ward 1, the township councillor for Angus is Pieter Kiezebrink.

Angus is named in honour of Angus Morrison, former Member of the Legislative Assembly for Simcoe North.

=== Climate ===
Egbert 1 W, Ontario, Canada (1981-2010 quasi-normals)

Climate chart (precipitation, max. and min. temperature)
| J | F | M | A | M | J | J | A | S | O | N | D |
| 1.6 27 11 | 2.1 30 13 | 2 39 20 | 2.9 53 33 | 3.6 66 43 | 3.1 74 53 | 3.7 79 57 | 2.4 77 55 | 2.3 70 48 | 2.1 57 38 | 3.4 44 30 | 2.7 32 18 |
- █ Average max. and min. temperatures in °F
- █ Precipitation totals in inches
Metric conversion
| J | F | M | A | M | J | J | A | S | O | N | D |
| 41 −3 −12 | 52 −1 −11 | 51 4 −7 | 73 12 1 | 91 19 6 | 79 23 12 | 93 26 14 | 60 25 13 | 58 21 9 | 53 14 3 | 86 6 −1 | 69 0 −8 |
- █ Average max. and min. temperatures in °C
- █ Precipitation totals in mm

Climate data for Egbert (1991−2020 normals, extremes 1988–present)
| Month | Jan | Feb | Mar | Apr | May | Jun | Jul | Aug | Sep | Oct | Nov | Dec | Year |
|---|---|---|---|---|---|---|---|---|---|---|---|---|---|
| Record high humidex | 15.5 | 15.8 | 28.9 | 36.1 | 41.5 | 48.4 | 45.9 | 46.0 | 41.6 | 37.6 | 27.3 | 18.3 | 48.4 |
| Record high °C (°F) | 15.0 (59.0) | 16.0 (60.8) | 26.5 (79.7) | 29.5 (85.1) | 33.6 (92.5) | 35.3 (95.5) | 35.0 (95.0) | 36.5 (97.7) | 34.5 (94.1) | 29.1 (84.4) | 24.0 (75.2) | 17.0 (62.6) | 36.5 (97.7) |
| Mean daily maximum °C (°F) | −2.9 (26.8) | −2.0 (28.4) | 3.2 (37.8) | 10.9 (51.6) | 18.4 (65.1) | 23.4 (74.1) | 26.0 (78.8) | 25.0 (77.0) | 21.1 (70.0) | 13.6 (56.5) | 6.4 (43.5) | 0.3 (32.5) | 11.9 (53.4) |
| Daily mean °C (°F) | −7.2 (19.0) | −6.4 (20.5) | −1.3 (29.7) | 5.6 (42.1) | 12.3 (54.1) | 17.5 (63.5) | 20.1 (68.2) | 19.2 (66.6) | 15.3 (59.5) | 8.9 (48.0) | 2.7 (36.9) | −3.2 (26.2) | 7.0 (44.6) |
| Mean daily minimum °C (°F) | −11.3 (11.7) | −10.8 (12.6) | −5.9 (21.4) | 0.3 (32.5) | 6.2 (43.2) | 11.5 (52.7) | 14.2 (57.6) | 13.3 (55.9) | 9.5 (49.1) | 4.1 (39.4) | −1.1 (30.0) | −6.6 (20.1) | 2.0 (35.6) |
| Record low °C (°F) | −35.5 (−31.9) | −32.1 (−25.8) | −29 (−20) | −14.3 (6.3) | −5.1 (22.8) | 1.0 (33.8) | 5.0 (41.0) | 4.5 (40.1) | −2.5 (27.5) | −6.3 (20.7) | −22.1 (−7.8) | −32 (−26) | −35.5 (−31.9) |
| Record low wind chill | −38.5 | −41.7 | −35.9 | −18.0 | −6.8 | 0.0 | 0.0 | 0.0 | −3.8 | −8.8 | −25.2 | −36.9 | −41.7 |
| Average precipitation mm (inches) | 54.7 (2.15) | 44.7 (1.76) | 47.9 (1.89) | 61.6 (2.43) | 73.9 (2.91) | 83.0 (3.27) | 77.9 (3.07) | 82.6 (3.25) | 72.3 (2.85) | 65.4 (2.57) | 71.8 (2.83) | 57.6 (2.27) | 793.2 (31.23) |
| Average rainfall mm (inches) | 21.3 (0.84) | 15.5 (0.61) | 23.7 (0.93) | 56.4 (2.22) | 70.2 (2.76) | 83.9 (3.30) | 76.2 (3.00) | 73.5 (2.89) | 75.8 (2.98) | 61.3 (2.41) | 55.0 (2.17) | 19.6 (0.77) | 632.4 (24.90) |
| Average snowfall cm (inches) | 40.2 (15.8) | 32.9 (13.0) | 26.1 (10.3) | 8.9 (3.5) | 0.1 (0.0) | 0.0 (0.0) | 0.0 (0.0) | 0.0 (0.0) | 0.0 (0.0) | 2.7 (1.1) | 21.9 (8.6) | 41.5 (16.3) | 174.1 (68.5) |
| Average precipitation days (≥ 0.2 mm) | 18.3 | 14.4 | 14.3 | 12.5 | 13.5 | 12.4 | 12.8 | 12.9 | 13.3 | 14.8 | 16.9 | 17.3 | 173.3 |
| Average rainy days (≥ 0.2 mm) | 4.0 | 3.3 | 5.9 | 10.9 | 13.1 | 11.6 | 11.8 | 11.8 | 12.8 | 14.4 | 10.8 | 5.4 | 115.6 |
| Average snowy days (≥ 0.2 cm) | 15.2 | 11.2 | 9.1 | 3.0 | 0.19 | 0.0 | 0.0 | 0.0 | 0.0 | 0.88 | 6.3 | 11.6 | 57.4 |
| Average relative humidity (%) (at 15:00 LST) | 75.5 | 70.3 | 62.3 | 55.7 | 54.6 | 57.4 | 56.1 | 58.1 | 60.2 | 66.2 | 72.2 | 79.5 | 64.0 |
Source: Environment and Climate Change Canada

== Demographics ==
In the 2021 Census of Population conducted by Statistics Canada, Essa had a population of 22,970 living in 7,949 of its 8,232 total private dwellings, a change of 9% from its 2016 population of 21,083. With a land area of 279.92 km^{2} (108.08 sq mi), it had a population density of 82.1/km^{2} (212.5/sq mi) in 2021.

Canada census – Essa community profile

| | 2021 | 2016 | 2011 |
| Population | 22,970 (+9.0% from 2016) | 21,083 (+13.9% from 2011) | 18,505 (+9.5% from 2006) |
| Land area | 279.92 km^{2} (108.08 sq mi) | 280.03 km^{2} (108.12 sq mi) | 280.07 km^{2} (108.14 sq mi) |
| Population density | 82.1/km^{2} (213/sq mi) | 75.3/km^{2} (195/sq mi) | 66.1/km^{2} (171/sq mi) |
| Median age | 37.6 (M: 37.2, F: 38.0) | 36.5 (M: 35.5, F: 37.6) |
| Private dwellings | 8,232 (total) 7,949 (occupied) | 7,478 (total) | 6,930 (total) |
| Median household income | $108,000 | $87,243 |

References: 2021 2016 2011

Historical census populations – Essa, Ontario

| Year | Pop. | ±% |
|---|---|---|
| 1871 | 4,221 | — |
| 1881 | 4,666 | +10.5% |
| 1891 | 3,592 | −23.0% |
| 1901 | 3,438 | −4.3% |
| 1911 | 3,084 | −10.3% |
| 1921 | 2,910 | −5.6% |
| 1931 | 3,631 | +24.8% |
| 1941 | 2,999 | −17.4% |

| Year | Pop. | ±% |
|---|---|---|
| 1951 | 10,176 | +239.3% |
| 1956 | 12,658 | +24.4% |
| 1961 | 13,753 | +8.7% |
| 1966 | 14,455 | +5.1% |
| 1971 | 12,028 | −16.8% |
| 1976 | 14,369 | +19.5% |
| 1981 | 13,774 | −4.1% |
| 1986 | 12,558 | −8.8% |

| Year | Pop. | ±% |
|---|---|---|
| 1991 | 14,177 | +12.9% |
| 1996 | 16,363 | +15.4% |
| 2001 | 16,808 | +2.7% |
| 2006 | 16,901 | +0.6% |
| 2011 | 18,505 | +9.5% |
| 2016 | 21,083 | +13.9% |
| 2021 | 22,970 | +9.0% |

Population counts are not adjusted for boundary changes.
Source: Statistics Canada

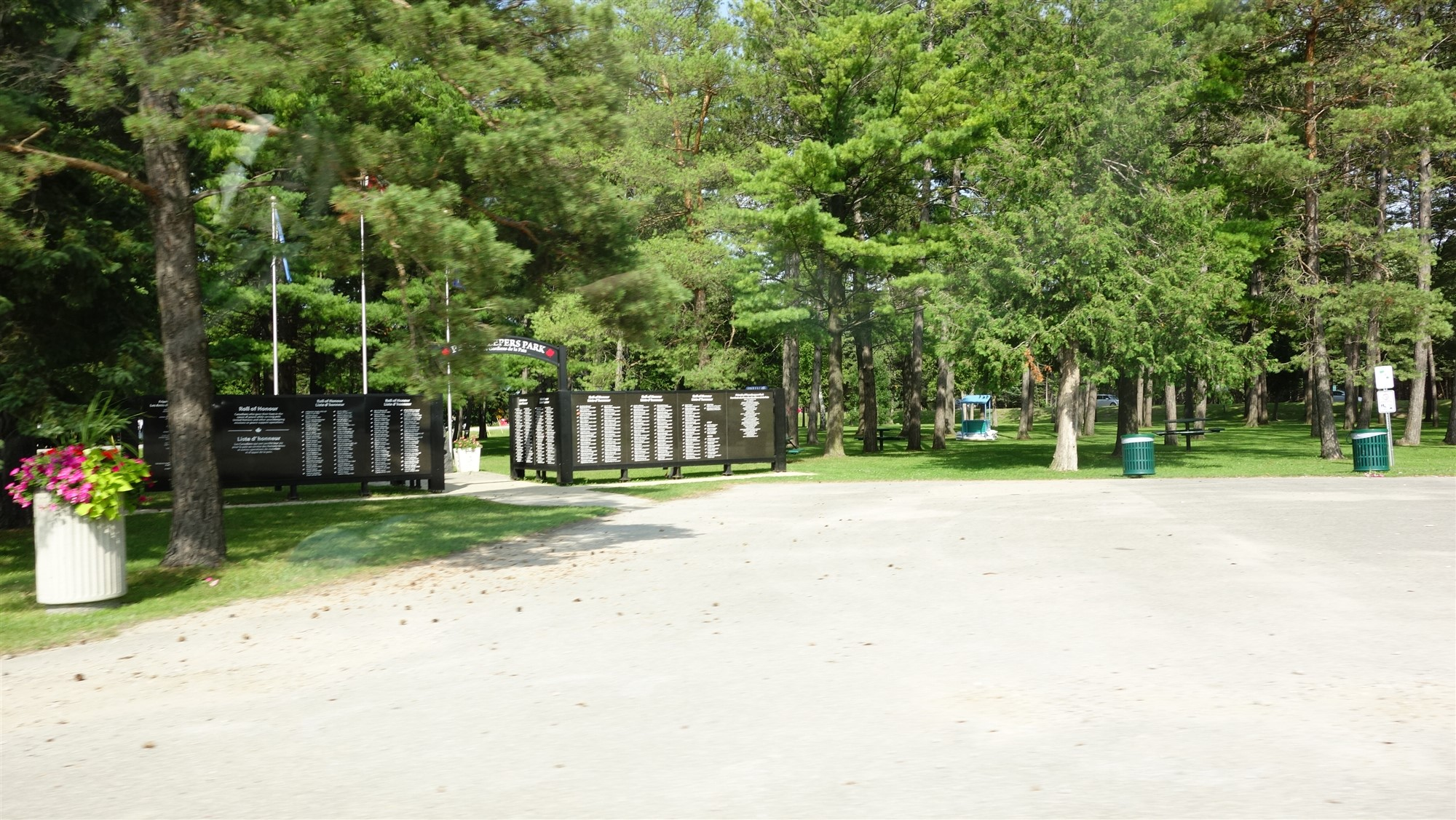
Peacekeepers Park, Angus

== Local government ==
Essa is governed by a Mayor, a Deputy Mayor and three Councillors, with one Councillor representing each of the three municipal wards. The Mayor of Essa represents the town on the Simcoe County Council. As of the 2022 election, the elected council members are:

- Mayor: Sandie MacDonald
- Deputy Mayor: Michael Smith
  - Councillors:
  - Ward 1: Pieter Kiezebrink
  - Ward 2: Henry Sander
  - Ward 3: Liana Maltby

=== Fire, EMS and police services ===
Township of Essa Fire Department is a fire services staffed by full-time chief, Doug Burgin and deputy chief, Gary McNamara. With 54 volunteer fire fighters at two stations (Angus and Thornton).

Ambulance service is covered by County of Simcoe Paramedic Service station in Angus.

Policing in Essa Township is covered by Ontario Provincial Police Nottawasaga Detachment.

== Education ==
Essa Township has four elementary schools and a high school:

- Angus Morrison Elementary School (Angus)
- Pine River Elementary School (Angus)
- Baxter Central Public School (Baxter)
- Our Lady of Grace Catholic School (Angus)
- Nottawasaga Pines Secondary School (Angus)

These schools are managed by the Simcoe County District School Board and the Simcoe Muskoka Catholic District School Board.

There are also two secular French public schools accessible to Essa residents, managed by the French secular public school board, Conseil Scolaire Viamonde.

- Academie La Pinède (Borden)
- Ecole Secondaire Romeo Dallaire (Barrie)

Conseil scolaire catholique MonAvenir is the French Catholic school district. It operates:

- École élémentaire catholique Marguerite-Bourgeois (Borden)
- École secondaire catholique Nouvelle-Alliance (Barrie)

There is also a private high school

- Convoy International Secondary Academy (Utopia)

This school is inspected by the Ministry of Education and approved to give credits for grade 9-12 courses. The school is a private day and boarding school for local and international students. Convoy offers in-class and online classes to meet each student’s needs.

== Notable residents ==
Controversial politician Helena Guergis, the former Member of Parliament for Simcoe—Grey, resides in Angus. Her cousin David Guergis was Essa's mayor until 2010.

Frederick Grant Banting (1891–1941), co-discoverer of insulin, was born in Essa.

== See also ==
- List of townships in Ontario
- List of francophone communities in Ontario
