= Nottawasaga Pines Secondary School =

Location
- 8505 County Road 10; Essa, Ontario, L0M 1B1; Canada; 44.4872°N 80.2157°W

Information
- Funding type: Public
- Founded: 2011
- School board: Simcoe County District School Board
- Superintendent: John Playford
- School number: 902636
- Principal: Colleen Ireland
- Grades: 9-12
- Enrollment: 700 (2020–21)
- Colors: Black, White & Red
- Team name: "The Timberwolves"
- Website: nps.scdsb.on.ca

Nottawasaga Pines Secondary School, also known as NPSS, is a public secondary school in Angus, Ontario. The principal is Colleen Ireland. It opened in September 2011, and currently has curriculum for Grades 9–12. The school is part of the Simcoe County District School Board. The school serves secondary school students from a number of areas such as, Essa Township, Base Borden, Community of Angus, Tosorontio, a portion of Clearview Township and the south west corner of the city of Barrie, Ontario.

== Academics and classes ==
Nottawasaga Pines Secondary School offers a full range of courses for success in all three pathways: University, College, and Workplace.

Some available courses include:

- Math
- Science (Biology, Chemistry, Environmental Science, Physics, Health Science)
- English
- French
- History (American History, History Before The 19th Century)
- Geography (Environment and Resource Management, Travel & Tourism)
- Co-operative Education (2 Credit and 4 Credit programs)
- Career Studies
- Parenting
- Fashion
- Fitness & Gym
- Leadership & Peer Support
- Law
- Hospitality & Tourism
- Food & Nutrition
- Construction
- Media Arts
- Theatrical Arts
- Drama
- Dance
- Visual Arts
- Communication Technology
- Manufacturing Technology
- Automotive Technology
- Custom Woodworking
- Cosmetology
- Instrumental Music
- Design

All courses offered by Nottawasaga Pines Secondary School can be found on the school's course calendar.

== Facilities ==
Nottawasaga Pines Secondary School was designed by Snyder Architects and completed in October 2011 by Percon Construction for the Simcoe County District School Board. The school was opened with 600 students, and is located on the outskirts of Angus, on Simcoe County Road 10. The school has three floors and many eco-friendly features (including solar panels). Athletic facilities include a large gymnasium, exercise room, as well as an outdoor gravel running track. Other features include a large parking area (shared with the neighbouring arena and ice rink), and a medium-sized soccer/football/rugby field. The school also has a large number of windows to produce natural light inside the building.

== Feeder schools ==
Elementary Feeder Schools within the Simcoe County District School Board as follows:

- Angus Morrison ES (Angus)
- Baxter Central PS (Baxter)
- New Lowell Central PS (New Lowell)
- Pine River ES (Angus)
- Tosorontio Central PS (Everett)
- WC Little ES (Barrie)

== Student activities ==
Nottawasaga Pines Secondary School currently offers many clubs and activities, including:

- Production Crew
- Link Crew
- Drama Club & Sears Festival
- Dance Team
- Concert Band
- Student Council
- Student Investment
- Peer Tutoring
- Dance
- Gay-straight alliance
- Diversity and Excellence club

as well as various sports teams, including hockey, rugby, soccer, flag football, cross country, badminton, track and field, volleyball, basketball, football, cross country, etc.

== Community use of the school ==
Nottawasaga Pines currently is accommodating the Essa Library Angus Branch which the school shares with Essa Township. Because of this partnership, students have the opportunity to come in at any time during the day and use it much like a normal school library. Since the school and the public library both have ownership, the library has increased materials, and a larger facility. The local Ontario Provincial Police detachment is also found within the same building, although it does have its own separate entrance.

== See also ==
- Education in Ontario
- List of secondary schools in Ontario
