= Numerical Propulsion System Simulation =

Software environment for propulsion system simulation

- Developers: NASA Glenn Research Center; NPSS Consortium
- Initial release: 1995; 31 years ago
- Stable release: 3.3
- Written in: C++
- Type: Engineering simulation software
- License: Proprietary export controlled
- Website: swri.org/numerical-propulsion-system-simulation-npss

Numerical Propulsion System Simulation (NPSS) is an object-oriented, thermodynamic modeling and simulation environment used for the analysis of propulsion, power, and thermal fluid systems. It is used in the aerospace industry for modeling turbomachinery, airbreathing propulsion systems, and liquid rocket engines.

== History ==
NPSS originated as a NASA effort to reduce the cost and development time associated with hardware testing of advanced propulsion systems, specifically in the early stages of the design process as a way to assess operational problems that are difficult to reproduce experimentally. It was intended to serve as a modular and extensible framework for integrating multicomponent and multidisciplinary analysis tools across distributed computing resources.

=== Software distribution and consortium ===
Although initially developed by NASA Lewis Research Center in the 1990s, it evolved into a cooperative effort between NASA, other U.S. government agencies, industry, and academia, with the goal of combining propulsion technologies with high-performance computing. The Southwest Research Institute (SwRI) took over management and distribution of NPSS, on behalf of the NPSS Consortium, in 2013 so that members could continue developing it for industrial needs. The software is export controlled, and NPSS license sales are restricted to countries not on the U.S. Department of Commerce Anti-Terrorism watch list.

== Architecture and modeling approach ==
NPSS is designed around object-oriented modeling of systems assembled from component objects, commonly called elements. In an airbreathing engine cycle, for example, a model may contain elements representing an inlet, compressor, burner, turbine, duct, shaft, and nozzle. Users can instantiate standard elements and connect them to define a flow network; they can also create customized elements by modifying or extending interpreted class definitions.

The system architecture may be categorized into three broad elements: engineering application models, system software for the simulation environment, and the high-performance computing environment. NPSS includes solver capabilities for design, off-design, one-pass, steady-state, and transient analyses. In a design analysis, the solver can determine component performance parameters needed to meet specified objectives; in an off-design analysis, it can evaluate the behavior of a selected design away from the design point; and in a transient analysis, it can simulate time-varying conditions such as power changes, sudden load applications, or pressure vessel blowdown.

== See also ==
- Aircraft engine
- Gas turbine
- Rocket engine
- Turbomachinery
- Computer-aided engineering
- Multidisciplinary design optimization
