= Simcoe County District School Board =

Public School Board of Simcoe County, Ontario, Canada

Simcoe County District School Board (SCDSB)

Location
- 1170 Highway 26 West; Midhurst, Ontario; L9X 1N6 Simcoe County, Ontario Canada
- Coordinates: 44.44642°N 79.74853°W

District information
- Motto: Your Future... Our Priority
- Chair of the board: Brandy Rafeek
- Director of education: Dawn Stephens
- Schools: 116 (14 Secondary, 87 Elementary, 9 Alternative Secondary, 6 Learning Centres)
- Budget: CA$508.7 million (2011-12)

Students and staff
- Students: 50,000 (approx.)
- Staff: 6,000+

Other information
- Elected trustees: Donna Armstrong (Innisfil); Liz Grummett (Oro-Medonte, Springwater); Sarah Beitz (New Tecumseth); Robin Talbot (Midland, Penetanguishene, Tay, Tiny); Debbie Connors (Bradford, West Gwillimbury); Jodi Lloyd (Orillia, Ramara, Severn); Dana Powell (Barrie - Wards 4–6); Brandy Rafeek (Adjala-Tosorontio, Clearview, CFB Borden, Essa); Lynn Strachan (Barrie - Wards 1–3); Anne Harrigan (First Nation Communities); Mike Foley (Collingwood, Wasaga Beach); Lisa-Marie Wilson (Barrie - Wards 7–10)
- Website: Official website

Simcoe County District School Board (SCDSB, known as English-language Public District School Board No. 17 and Simcoe County Board Of Education prior to 1999) is an Ontario, Canada, English speaking public school board, serving Simcoe County. The schools and learning centres are branched throughout 4,800 square kilometres in Simcoe County. This Central Ontario setting is bordered by the Holland Marsh in the south, the Trent-Severn Waterway in the east, Grey County in the west and Muskoka in the north.

== Staff and students ==
The SCDSB currently has over 50,000 students in 87 elementary schools, 14 secondary schools, 9 alternative secondary schools and 6 adult learning centres. The SCDSB also employs over 6,000 employees.

== Budget ==
The SCDSB is funded by the Ministry of Education for the province of Ontario. Funding for the year ending August 2012 totals some $508,762,274. This is broken down by 18 major funding lines including Pupil Foundation Grant (252.5 M), School Foundation Grant (34.4 M), Special Education Grant (66.7 M), Language Grant (6.5 M), FNMI Grant (1.2 M), Learning Opportunities Grant (4.0 M), Safe School Supplement (0.9 M), Program Enhancement Grant (1.0 M), Continuing Education Grant (2.6 M), Cost Adjustment/ Teacher Qualifications (38.8 M), Student Transportation Grant (18.8 M), Declining Enrolment Adjustment (2.6 M), School Board Administration and Governance (13.1 M), School Operations Allocation (44.7 M), School Renewal Allocation (6.7), Interest Expense (11.8 M), Non-Permanently Financed Capital Debt (2.0 M). These amounts are further broken down by the Ministry of Education, many with restrictions on their use, and others that are locally managed. Funding for the 2012–13 school year is projected to be approximately 2.4 million dollars less than 2011–12, due to the province's focus on containing costs in order to address a 16 billion dollar deficit. Unlike all other levels of government, school boards are not allowed to maintain any long term operational deficits.

== High school rankings ==
Secondary school Fraser Institute provincial rankings as of 2019, and enrollments as of 2022 are as follows:.

SCDSB secondary schools
Name	Location	Enrollment	1-year ranking of 739	5-year ranking of 630
Banting Memorial High School	Alliston	1,464	440	265
Barrie North Collegiate Institute	Barrie	1,097	391	335
Bear Creek Secondary School	Barrie	1,550	420	354
Bradford District High School	Bradford	1,220	149	228
Collingwood Collegiate Institute	Collingwood	1,399	180	303
Eastview Secondary School	Barrie	1,265	440	352
Elmvale District High School	Springwater	411	406	457
Georgian Bay District Secondary School	Midland	881	620	NA
Innisdale Secondary School	Barrie	1,624	440	352
Maple Ridge Secondary School	Barrie	NA	NA	NA
Nantyr Shores Secondary School	Innisfil	1,224	530	427
Nottawasaga Pines Secondary School	Angus	682	542	442
Orillia Secondary School	Orillia	1,147	261	N/A
Stayner Collegiate Institute	Clearview	314	687	564
Twin Lakes Secondary School	Orillia	766	642	531

== Former secondary schools ==
Barrie Central Collegiate Institute, founded in 1843, closed in 2016.

Park Street Collegiate, closed in 2015.

Orillia District Collegiate Vocational Institute, closed in 2015.

Penetanguishene Secondary School, opened in 1966, closed in 2016.

== See also ==
- Simcoe Muskoka Catholic District School Board
- List of school districts in Ontario
- List of high schools in Ontario
