= Barrie North Collegiate Institute =

Location
- 110 Grove Street East; Barrie, Ontario, L4M 2P3; Canada; 44°24′01″N 79°41′22″W

Information
- School type: Public, high school
- Founded: 1956
- School board: Simcoe County District School Board
- School number: 893323
- Principal: Alison Chornobaj
- Grades: 9–12
- Enrollment: 1170 (2020–2021)
- Language: English and French
- Colours: Green and Gold
- Team name: Vikings
- Website: nor.scdsb.on.ca

Barrie North Collegiate Institute is a public secondary school (grades 9–12) located in Barrie, Ontario, Canada. It was established in 1957 as part of the Simcoe County District School Board in southern Ontario. The principal is Alison Chornobaj.

Barrie North Collegiate Institute has a catchment area of north Barrie, and a large rural portion of Springwater Township (villages of Midhurst and Minesing).

== Clubs ==
The school offers many extracurricular activities such as sports teams, concert band and choir, jazz ensembles, and numerous clubs such as Free the Children and Canoe club.

Barrie North's improvisational team won Gold in 2009/2010 for the Canadian Improv Games (Toronto Region). The team placed 9th in Canada at the Canadian Improv Game National Championship beating out 600 teams cross-country.

== Gifted Program ==
Barrie North offers a gifted program open to all students. Gifted courses may move at a quicker pace than standard courses and cover material in more depth. Some gifted courses include Math, Science, English, Art, Geography, Latin, and Civics and Careers. Gifted courses are available in grades 9 and 10, and AP (advanced placement) courses which are an extension of the gifted program are available in grade 12. Certain pre-AP courses are also available in grade 11.

== French Immersion Program ==
Barrie North offers a French immersion program that offers many French courses, as well as the opportunity to receive a French Immersion Certificate as long as the requirements have been met. This program was instated in September, 2021

== Cooperative Education Program ==
Barrie North offers a co-op course in grade 11 and 12 that allows students to earn high school credits while completing a work placement in the community. Two credit co-op students generally work in the mornings or afternoons while four credit students work both in the morning and afternoon.

== Feeder schools ==
- Codrington PS
- Cundles Heights PS
- Emma King ES
- Hillcrest PS
- Maple Grove PS
- Minesing Central PS
- Oakley Park PS
- West Bayfield ES
- Andrew Hunter PS
- Portage View PS
- W.R. Best Memorial PS

== Notable Alumni ==
- Jake Julien Canadian football player

== See also ==
- Education in Ontario
- List of secondary schools in Ontario
