= Airlie =

Airlie may refer to:

== Places ==
In Canada

- Airlie, Ontario, Canada

In Scotland

- Airlie, Angus
- Airlie Castle

In the United States

- Airlie, Oregon
- Airlie, Minnesota
- Airlie, Virginia

== People ==
- Airlie (surname)
- Earl of Airlie, in the Peerage of Scotland

== Other uses ==
- Airlie, South Yarra, Melbourne, Australia, a historic house
- Airlie Beach, an inhabited place in Queensland, Australia
- Airlie (Natchez), a historic house in Natchez, Mississippi, United States
