= Milton, Nova Scotia =

Community in Nova Scotia, Canada

Coordinates: 44°3′41″N 64°45′4″W

Milton in Nova Scotia

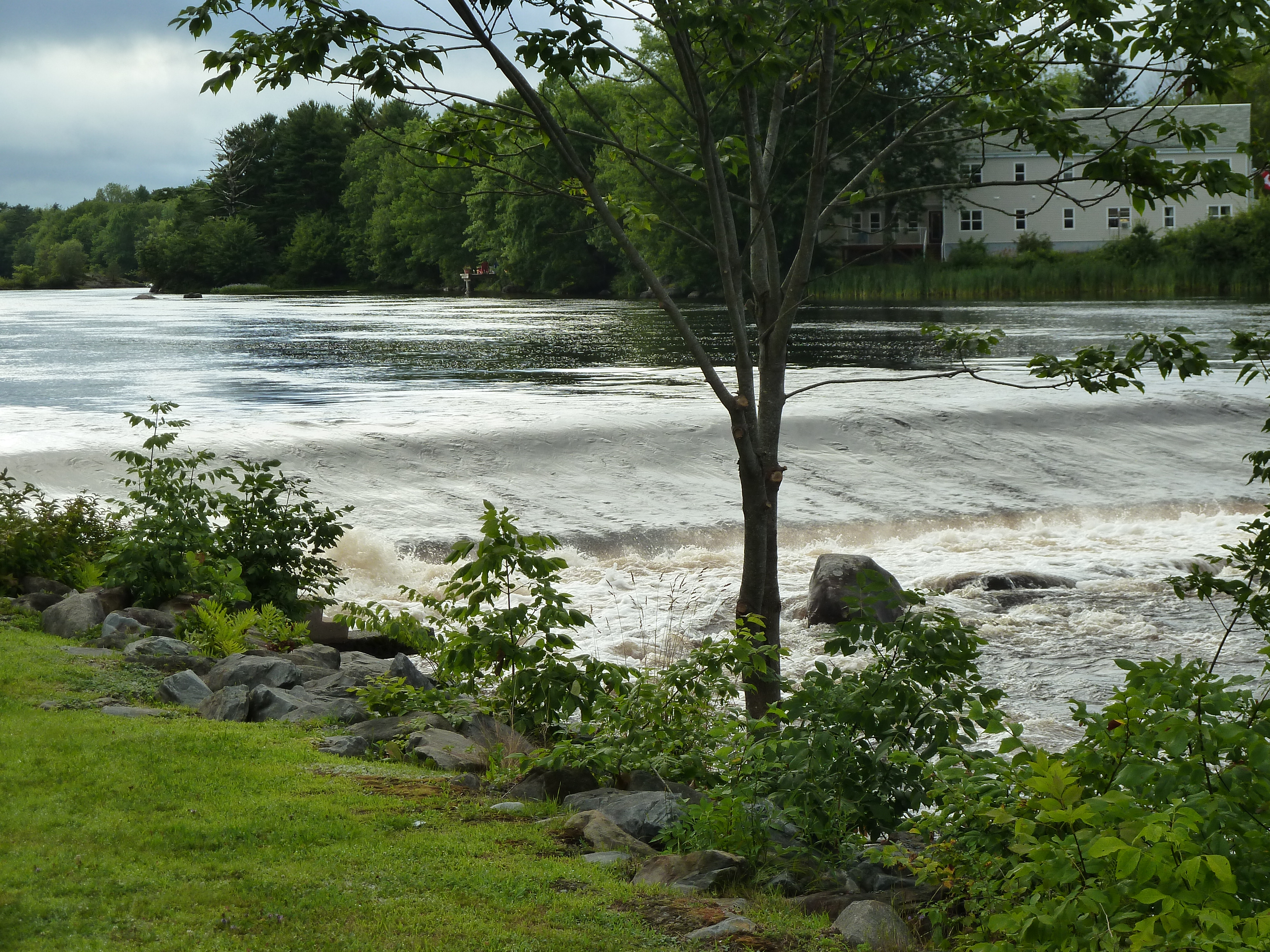
The Mersey river at Milton.

Milton is a community in the Canadian province of Nova Scotia, located immediately north of Liverpool in the Region of Queens Municipality. The village is most well known for being the birthplace of the international best selling author Margaret Marshall Saunders. Her most famous book was Beautiful Joe. In 1994, the Beautiful Joe Heritage Society was formed to celebrate the life and story of Beautiful Joe and the achievements of Margaret Marshall Saunders. The book is set in Meaford, Ontario, where the society has established a park dedicated to Beautiful Joe named Beautiful Joe Park.

As of 2021, the population was 999. The Mersey River, paralleled by Trunk 8, passes directly through Milton.

== Demographics ==
In the 2021 Census of Population conducted by Statistics Canada, Milton had a population of 999 living in 467 of its 504 total private dwellings, a change of 0% from its 2016 population of 999. With a land area of 7.18 km^{2} (2.77 sq mi), it had a population density of 139.1/km^{2} (360.4/sq mi) in 2021.

== Notable residents ==
- Darrell Dexter
- Gene Ford
- Sam Gloade
- Margaret Marshall Saunders
