= Earl Rowe Provincial Park =

Recreational park in Canada

- IUCN category II (national park)
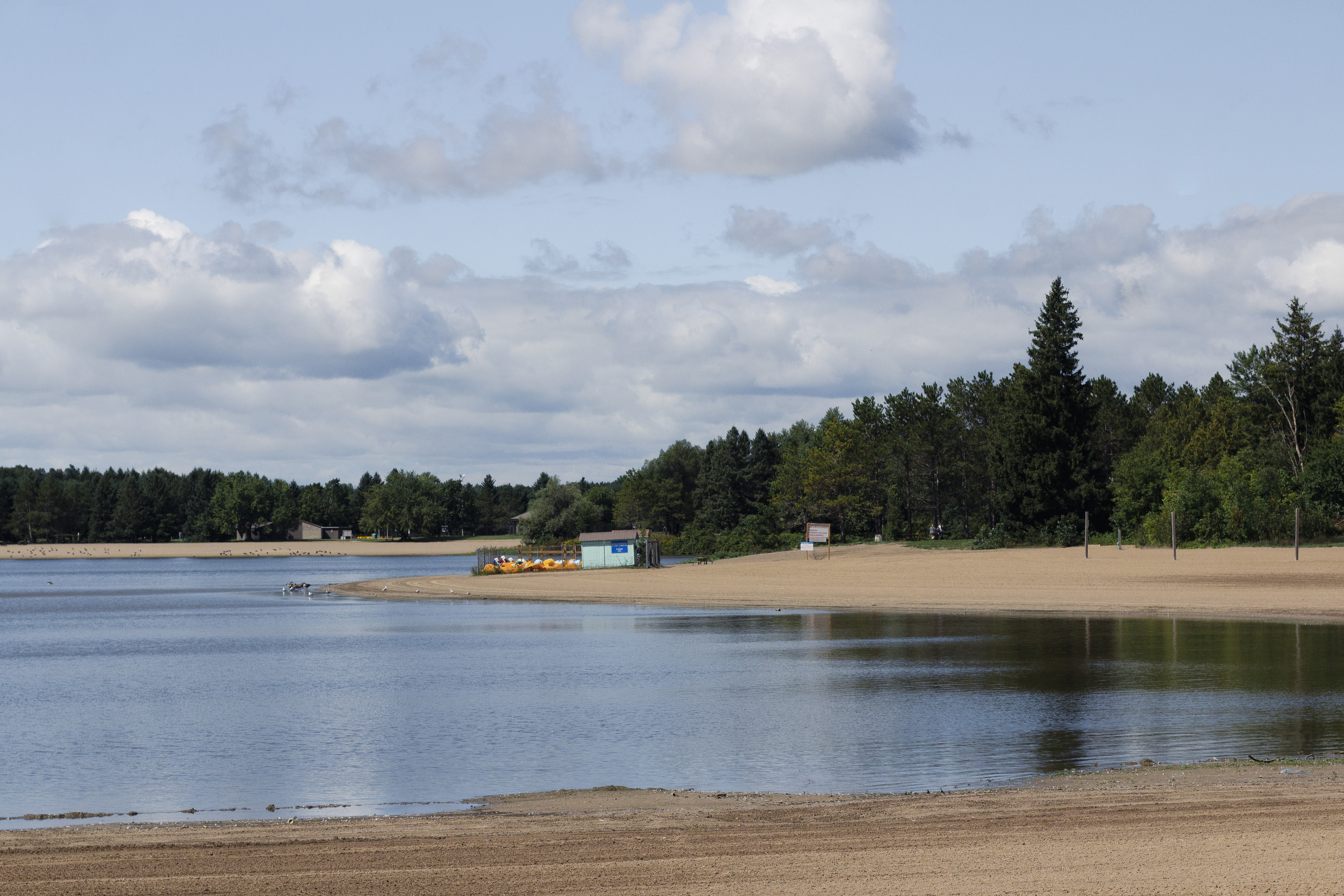
- View of Earl Rowe Lake

- Location within Southern Ontario
- Interactive map of Earl Rowe Provincial Park
- Location: Simcoe County, Ontario, Canada
- Nearest city: Barrie, Ontario
- Coordinates: 44°9′12.45888″N 79°54′10.225088″W
- Area: 312.42 ha (772.0 acres)
- Established: 1964
- Visitors: 148,543 (in 2022)
- Governing body: Ontario Parks
- Website: ontarioparks.ca/park/earlrowe

Earl Rowe Provincial Park is an Ontario Parks recreational park located in Adjala–Tosorontio near Alliston, Ontario.

The idea for the park was spearheaded by Rowe when he was area MP and began with the first land purchase in 1957 and additional farm land before it opened in 1964, the now 312.42 ha (772.0 acres) park was named for former Lieutenant Governor of Ontario William Earl Rowe. The park features a large man made lake, Earl Rowe Lake, created by damming the Boyne River. The lake provides swimming area for campers.

== See also ==
- Mono Cliffs Provincial Park
- Wasaga Beach Provincial Park
