= Boyne River (Nottawasaga River tributary) =

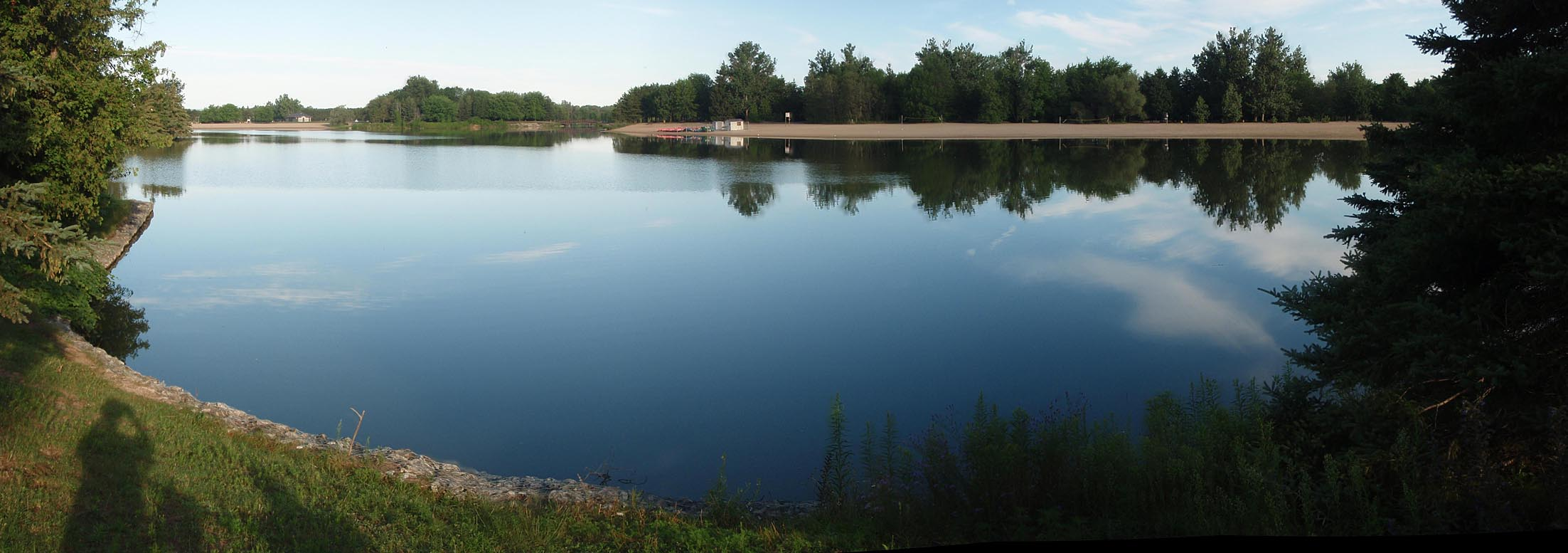
- Boyne River at Earl Rowe Provincial Park

- Location of the mouth of the Boyne River in southern Ontario

Location
- Country: Canada
- Province: Ontario
- Region: Central Ontario
- Counties: Simcoe; Dufferin

Physical characteristics
- Source: Unnamed pond
  - location: Melancthon, Dufferin County
  - coordinates: 44°06′27″N 80°16′02″W
  - elevation: 508 m (1,667 ft)
- Mouth: Nottawasaga River
  - location: Essa, Simcoe County
  - coordinates: 44°10′10″N 79°48′56″W
  - elevation: 205 m (673 ft)

Basin features
- River system: Great Lakes Basin

The Boyne River is a river in Simcoe County and Dufferin County in Central Ontario, Canada. It is part of the Great Lakes Basin, and is a left tributary of the Nottawasaga River. The rivers falls within the jurisdiction of the Nottawasaga Valley Conservation Authority.

== Course ==
The river begins at an unnamed pond in Melancthon, Dufferin County, that lies between the Toronto, Grey and Bruce Railway line and Ontario Highway 10. It heads southeast past the town of Shelburne, then heads east northeast roughly parallel to Ontario Highway 89 for the remainder of its course. It enters Mulmur, passes through Boyne Valley Provincial Park, and enters Adjala–Tosorontio in Simcoe County. The river goes through Earl Rowe Provincial Park (mostly as Earl Rowe Lake), briefly flows through New Tecumseth at the community of Alliston, then reaches its mouth at the Nottawasaga River at Essa. The Nottawasaga River flows to Georgian Bay on Lake Huron.

== Tributaries ==
- Spring Creek (right)
- Rosemont Creek (right)
- Tosorontio Creek (right)
- Primrose Creek (right)

== Sources ==
- Map 4 (PDF) (Map). 1 : 700,000. Official road map of Ontario. Ministry of Transportation of Ontario. 2010-01-01.
- Map 5 (PDF) (Map). 1 : 700,000. Official road map of Ontario. Ministry of Transportation of Ontario. 2010-01-01.
- Restructured municipalities - Ontario map #6 (Map). Restructuring Maps of Ontario. Ontario Ministry of Municipal Affairs and Housing. 2006. Archived from the original on 2021-02-24.
- Watershed Map (PDF) (Map). 1 : 375,000. Nottawasaga Valley Conservation Authority. Archived from the original (PDF) on 2012-04-17.
