= Margaret Marshall Saunders =

Canadian author (1861–1947)

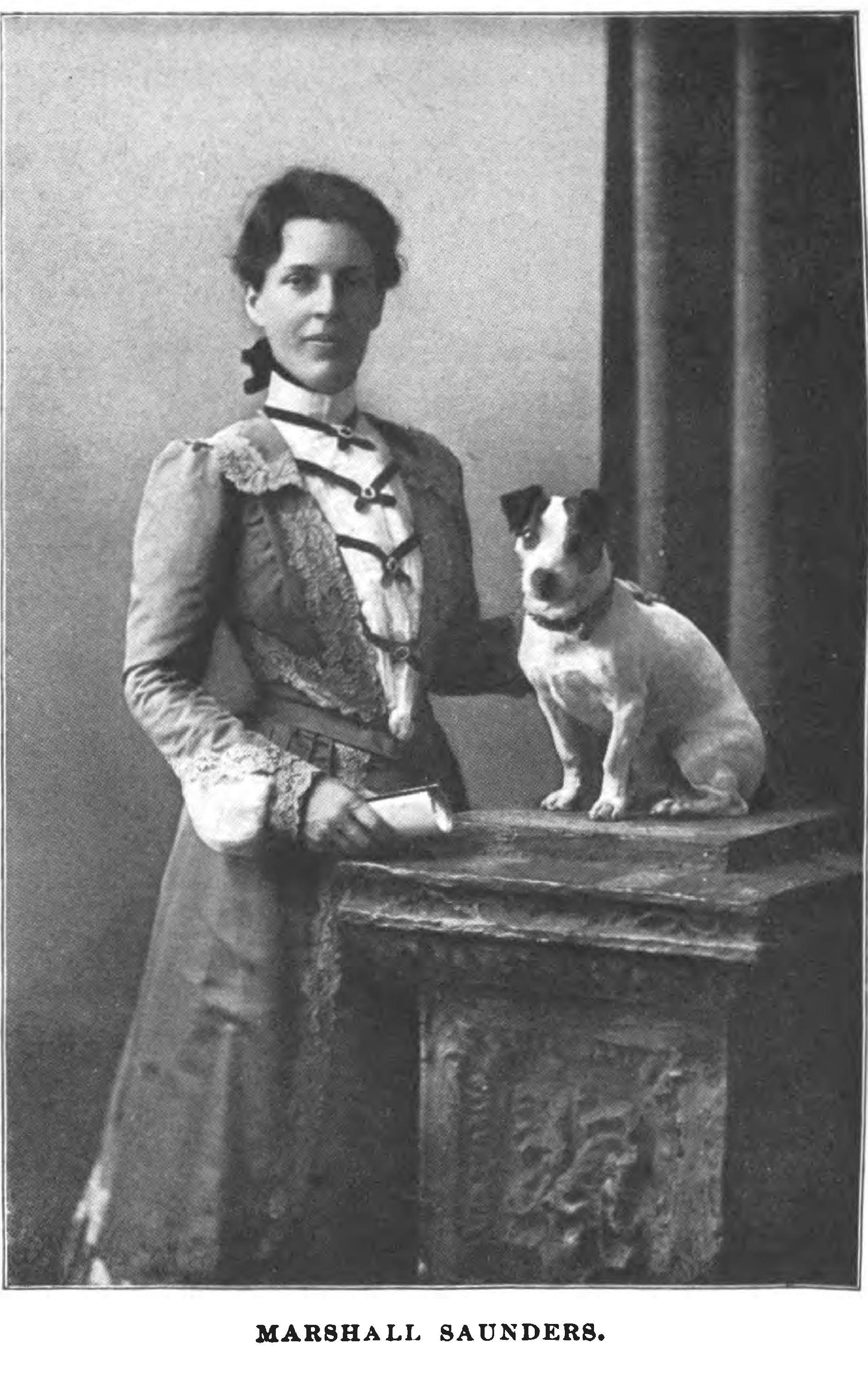
- Born: April 13, 1861 Milton, Nova Scotia (Crown Colony)
- Died: February 15, 1947 (aged 85) Toronto, Ontario, Canada
- Occupation: Author, lecturer, activist
- Genre: Children's literature, romance

Margaret Marshall Saunders CBE (April 13, 1861 – February 15, 1947) was a prolific Canadian writer of children's stories and romance novels, a lecturer, and an animal welfare advocate. She was an active member of the Local Council of Women of Halifax.

== Early life ==
Saunders was born April 13, 1861, in the village of Milton, Nova Scotia, one of four children born to Reverend Edmund M. and Maria (née Freeman) Saunders. She spent most of her childhood in Berwick, Nova Scotia, where her father was a Baptist minister. She studied in Edinburgh, Scotland, and Orleans, France, at the age of 15, before returning to Halifax, where she took courses at Dalhousie for a year prior to launching her career a freelance writer. It was in response to the male dominated nature of the publishing industry that she shortened her name to Marshall Saunders.

== Career ==
Saunders an advocate of animal welfare is most famous for her novel Beautiful Joe. It tells the true story of a dog from Meaford, Ontario, that had his ears and tail chopped off by an abusive owner as a puppy, but is rescued by a Meaford family whose lives he later saves. The story is written from the dog's point of view, and is often compared to Black Beauty which was released a few years earlier.

In 1889, Saunders submitted Beautiful Joe to the American Humane Education Society Prize Competition "Kind and Cruel Treatment of Domestic Animals and Birds in the Northern States", and won a prize of $200. When the book was brought to publication in 1893, both the book and its subject received worldwide attention. It was the first Canadian book to sell over a million copies, and by the late 1930s had sold over seven million copies worldwide. It was also translated into many languages, including Esperanto.

Following the publication of Beautiful Joe, Saunders, along with author Lucy Maud Montgomery, founded the Nova Scotia branch of the Canadian Women's Press Club, going on to serve as the National Vice-President of the Maritime branches of the club.

Saunders wrote more than twenty other stories, a number of which provided social commentary on such things as the abolition of child labour, slum clearance, and the improvement of playground facilities. Saunders also wrote newspaper articles about supervised playgrounds for city children and other social issues in the Halifax Morning Chronicle and the Toronto Globe. She also lectured frequently, and belonged to many organizations including various humane societies. In 1914, Saunders moved into 66 St. George Street in downtown Toronto, and later moved in with her younger sister at 62 Glengowan Avenue. Margaret's house was always filled with pets including at one time 28 canaries. She had a tendency to name her pets after the locations where they had been found, and once had a pigeon named 38 Front Street, and a dog named Johnny Doorstep.

Saunders received an Honorary Master of Arts from Acadia University in 1911.

In 1934, at age 73, she was appointed Commander of the Order of the British Empire (C.B.E.). That same year she also received a medal from the Société protectrice des animaux in Paris, France.

== Death and legacy ==
Saunders died in 1947 in Toronto, Ontario, where she had lived for a number of years. She is buried in Mount Pleasant Cemetery in Toronto. In 1953, a plaque was installed by the Nova Scotia Site and Monuments Board near the site where she was born in Milton, Nova Scotia, which was later moved to Tupper Park.

In 1994, the Beautiful Joe Heritage Society was formed to celebrate the life and story of Beautiful Joe and Saunders' achievements. A park dedicated to Beautiful Joe has been established in Meaford, Ontario.

== Selected publications ==
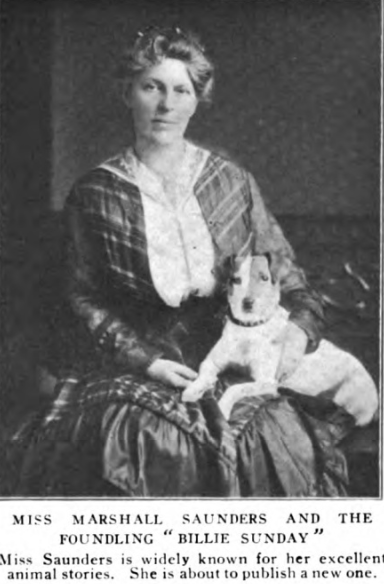
Margaret Marshall Saunders in 1918

- My Spanish Sailor (1889)
- Beautiful Joe (1893)
- Charles and His Lamb (1895)
- For the Other Boy's Sake, and Other Stories (1896)
- The House of Armour (1897)
- The King of the Park (1897)
- Deficient Saints (1899)
- For His Country (1900)
- Her Sailor (1900)
- Tilda Jane, An Orphan In Search of a Home (1901)
- Beautiful Joe's Paradise (1902)
- Nita, the Story of an Irish Setter (1904)
- The Story of Gravelys (1904)
- Princess Sukey; The Story of a Pigeon and Her Human Friends (1905)
- The Story of an Eskimo Dog (1906)
- My Pets (1908)
- Tilda Jane's Orphans (1909)
- The Girl from Vermont (1910)
- Pussy Black-Face (1913)
- Boy, the Wandering Dog (1916)
- Golden Dicky (1919)
- Bonnie Prince Fetlar (1920)
- Jimmy Gold-Coast (1924)
- Esther de Warren (1927)
