= 4th Canadian Division Training Centre =

Armed forces base in Grey County, Ontario, Canada

Coordinates: 44.664°N 80.667°W

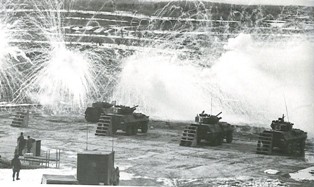
Firing exercises at Meaford, 1985

4th Canadian Division Training Centre (also 4 CDTC) is a Canadian Forces training facility operated by 4th Canadian Division of the Canadian Army.

It is located in Grey County, Ontario, in the Saugeen Ojibway Nation traditional territory, northwest of the Meaford townsite and approximately 25 km (16 mi) east of Owen Sound on a peninsula extending into Georgian Bay. Relatively few military personnel are stationed at the training centre as it serves primarily for training Primary Reserve and regular force stationed within 4th Canadian Division.

The training centre conducts year-round courses for Regular Force personnel, generally the DP1 Infantryman for the Royal Canadian Regiment, while expanding dramatically during the summer months to accommodate many courses for Primary Reserve personnel.

During the period of June–September every year, 4 CDTC Meaford serves as the primary training location for Primary Reserve and exercises for units from the 4th Canadian Division. It provides sniper training for Toronto's Emergency Task Force.

== Camp Meaford ==
In 1942, the Department of National Defence purchased 80 km^{2} (20,000 acres) of private lands along the Georgian Bay in the St. Vincent Township. The southern edge of this property is 5 km (3.1 mi) northwest of the town of Meaford and its western boundary is 15 km (9.3 mi) northeast of the city of Owen Sound. The property is centred on Cape Rich, a headland extending into Georgian Bay which divides Owen Sound from Nottawasaga Bay.

The Meaford Military Camp (also known as Camp Meaford or locally as The Tank Range) was intended for tank warfare and artillery gunnery training. Its landscape included limestone cliffs, dense forest and rolling open agricultural land, as well as swamps, all based on a topography of heavy clay broken up by a vast distribution of rock, Mountain Lake, and a 22 km (14 mi) shoreline. The facility was administratively an annex to Camp Borden.

From its inception during World War II until the late 1960s when the Canadian Forces were unified, Camp Meaford was used extensively by regular force Canadian Army units assigned to Camp Borden. It hosted the following training schools for exercises and driver training:

- Royal Canadian Armoured School
- Royal Canadian School of Infantry
- School of Intelligence and Security
- School of Administration and Logistics (formerly the Royal Canadian Army Service Corps School)
- School of Medical Services

The integration of the modern-day Canadian Forces saw the transfer of the Combat Arms School from CFB Borden to CFB Gagetown in 1969–1970, dramatically reducing the requirement for Camp Meaford. In 1970, it was decided to mothball the entire facility, reducing staffing from 153 military and civilian personnel to a five-person security staff of Commissionaires.

"...when Meaford Range is dormatized...it will no longer be used for military purposes, including Regular Force and Militia exercises, training and field firing." (April 1970 DND internal communication)

During the early 1970s, units of the Canadian Forces Primary Reserve began to make unofficial use of this DND property only 180 kilometres (110 mi) north of Toronto, rather than face the 380-kilometre (240 mi) drive to CFB Petawawa for training.

== Meaford Range and Training Area ==
A 1973 study recommended Camp Meaford be reactivated as a Primary Reserve training facility for manoeuvres and live firing exercises to save on transportation costs. The Meaford Range and Training Area reopened that year and saw use by Reserve Force, Regular Force, cadets and police forces for training.

The introduction of new vehicles and weaponry, namely in the form of the Grizzly and Cougar light armoured vehicles in the early 1980s, saw use of MRTA ranges increase substantially, particularly after it was determined CFB Petawawa's ranges were insufficient.

MRTA saw increased use through the late 1980s and early 1990s as the Canadian Forces Primary Reserve began to increase in numbers.

== Militia Training and Support Centre, Meaford ==
In September 1988, it was announced that MRTA would be renamed Militia Training and Support Centre, Meaford (MTSCM) and would become the focal point for training all reserve units in Ontario.

The creation of MTSCM saw all buildings and areas of the camp reactivated in August 1989 and a small number of personnel and civilian employees stationed at the facility full-time. By 1995, over $80 million ($149.95 million in 2025) in new construction for buildings, roads, waterworks and sewage disposal had taken place. Over $20 million ($37.49 million in 2025) in equipment and supplies were positioned at MTSCM to complement its training and support role.

== LFCATC Meaford ==
A mid-1990s reorganization of the Canadian Forces saw Mobile Command redesignated as Land Force Command, with its units across Canada divided geographically. The newly created Land Force Central Area redesignated MTSCM as Land Force Central Area Training Centre Meaford (LFCATC Meaford).

LFCATC Meaford is currently the primary training centre for 4th Canadian Division's reserve units. Regular Force units from CFB Petawawa are also minor users of the facility.

The training centre conducts year-round courses for regular force personnel, while expanding dramatically during the summer months to accommodate many courses for reserve personnel. During the period of September–June, LFCATC Meaford serves as the primary weekend training location for reserve unit exercises for units from the Greater Toronto Area and other locations across Southern Ontario. LFCA TC Meaford currently holds basic qualification courses as well as infantry and artillery training. It is visited by various outside units including multiple police forces and other nations. It also provides minimal simulators and training for urban environments.

== 4th Canadian Division Training Centre (4 CDTC) ==
In 2013 Meaford was renamed the 4th Canadian Division Training Centre when Land Force Central Area became the 4th Canadian Division.

== Facilities ==
Facilities are managed by Canadian Base Operators. There is one large dining hall and several messes. A sewage treatment and water purification plant is also on LFCATC Meaford grounds.

A pumped-storage hydroelectricity project was preliminarily approved in 2021.
