= Adjala-Tosorontio =

- Township (lower-tier)
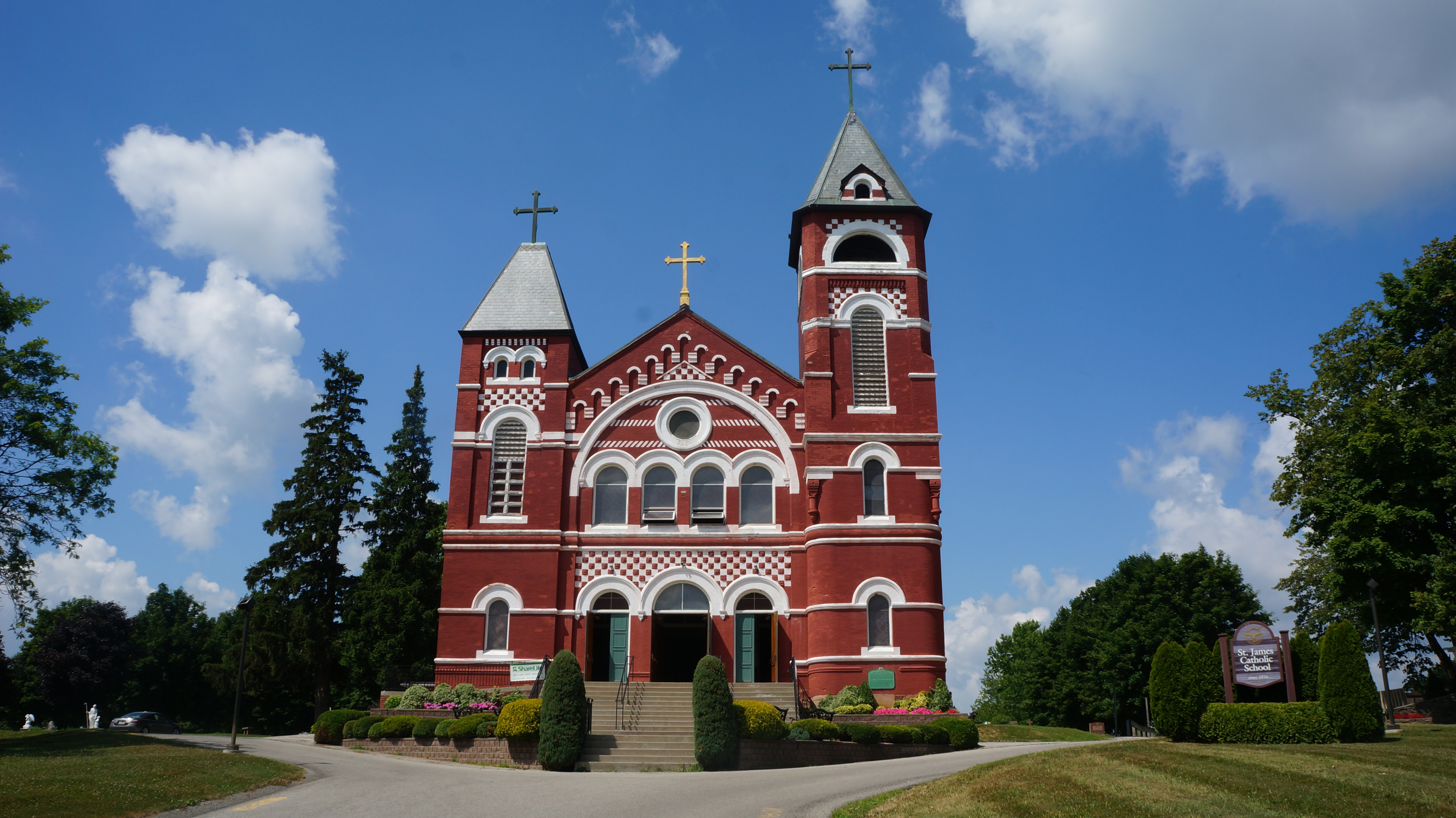
- Exterior of St. James Catholic Church in Colgan, Ontario.
- Motto: Welcome home.
- Location within Simcoe County Location within Southern Ontario
- Coordinates: 44°08′N 79°56′W
- Country: Canada
- Province: Ontario
- County: Simcoe
- Settled: 1820s
- Formed: January 1, 1994

Government
  - Mayor: Scott W. Anderson
  - Fed. riding: Simcoe—Grey
  - Prov. riding: Simcoe—Grey

Area
  - Land: 371.53 km^{2} (143.45 sq mi)

Population (2021)
  - Total: 10,989
  - Density: 29.6/km^{2} (77/sq mi)
  - Change (2016-21): 0.1%
- Time zone: UTC-5 (EST)
  - Summer (DST): UTC-4 (EDT)
- Area codes: 705, 519, 905
- Website: www.adjtos.ca

Adjala–Tosorontio is a township in south-central Ontario, Canada, in the County of Simcoe.

A predominantly rural area, Adjala–Tosorontio contains numerous small villages and hamlets. Many communities were started in Adjala by Irish Catholics who named their hamlets after their home towns in Ireland, or after prominent pioneer families who first settled the area. The municipality has increasingly become home to residents who commute to the Greater Toronto Area.

Geographically the area is rolling countryside below the Niagara Escarpment to the west, with the Nottawasaga River cutting through it.

"Tosorontio" is a Huron word meaning "Beautiful Mountain", and Adjala was the name of the son of Chief Tecumseh, for whom the neighbouring township (now called New Tecumseth) was named.

== History ==
Adjala–Tosorontio Township was created in 1993 when the County of Simcoe Act merged the townships of Adjala and Tosorontio. The amalgamation took effect on January 1, 1994.

== Communities ==
The township comprises the communities of Achill, Airlie, Athlone, Ballycroy, Cedarville, Colgan, Connor, Everett, Glencairn, Hockley, Keenansville, Lisle, Loretto, Rosemont, Sheldon, Tioga and Tuam.

=== Loretto ===
Loretto Hamlet (44°03′00″N 79°53′25″W) is one of the oldest communities in Adjala–Tosorontio. It has one of the oldest and most famous taverns in Simcoe County, the Loretto Inn. Highway 50 runs through the town.

Loretto was named after Loreto, Marche in Italy.

== Demographics ==
In the 2021 Census of Population conducted by Statistics Canada, Adjala-Tosorontio had a population of 10,989 living in 3,836 of its 3,995 total private dwellings, a change of 0.1% from its 2016 population of 10,975. With a land area of 371.53 km^{2} (143.45 sq mi), it had a population density of 29.6/km^{2} (76.6/sq mi) in 2021.

Historical census populations – Adjala–Tosorontio
Year	Pop.	±%
1996	9,359	—
2001	10,082	+7.7%
2006	10,695	+6.1%
2011	10,603	−0.9%
2016	10,975	+3.5%
2021	10,989	+0.1%
Source: Statistics Canada

== See also ==
- List of municipalities in Ontario
- List of townships in Ontario
- Earl Rowe Provincial Park
