= Sam Gloade =

Mi'kmaq soldier (1878–1957)

DCM Sam Gloade
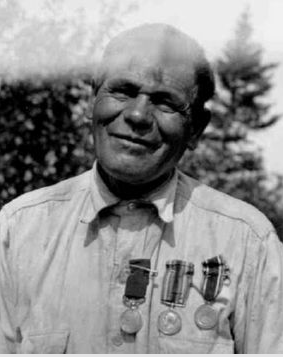
- Sam Gloade with military medals; photo by Clara Dennis
- Military career
- Allegiance: Canada
- Branch: Canadian Army
- Rank: Sergeant
- Units: 64th Battalion, CEF; 1st Canadian Tunnelling Company
- Conflicts: First World War: Battle of Messines

Sergeant Sam Gloade (Glode), DCM (April 20, 1878 – October 25, 1957) was a decorated Mi'kmaq soldier from Milton, Nova Scotia. He served in World War I and was awarded the Distinguished Conduct Medal, the British War Medal and the Victory Medal. He trained first with the 64th Battalion, CEF, an infantry reinforcement holding unit in England, and then joined the 1st Canadian Tunnelling Company, Canadian Engineers. Sam was in the Battle of Messines (1917). He reported:

Late that afternoon the German artillery on Messines Ridge began to shell our trench and kept it up for a long time. They scared us bad, I tell you. We were all green hands, and we would leave our rifles and run along the trench away from shell burst. Then another shell would burst near us and we would run down the trench again. Some fellows got hit and they hollered and there was a lot of blood.

He dug trenches under Vimy Ridge, patched roadways near Amiens and defused mines after the war. On one occasion, he was in charge of 20 soldiers who got trapped underground. He is credited with having single-handedly dug for hours before he was able to burrow a hole to the surface. He worked from the La Clytte Camp (close to Ypres in Belgium) for over a year. Glode was also in the Battle of Passchendaele and Battle of Amiens (1918). Gloade is buried in the St. Gregory's Roman Catholic Church Cemetery, Milton, Nova Scotia. His son Louis was a member of the Nova Scotia Highlanders and was wounded by a piece of shrapnel.

== See also ==
- Military history of Nova Scotia
- Military history of the Mi’kmaq people
- Tunnelling companies of the Royal Engineers
