= Gene Ford =

Canadian baseball player (1881–1973)

- Pitcher
- Born: April 16, 1881; Milton, Nova Scotia
- Died: August 23, 1973 (aged 92); Dunedin, Florida
- Batted: Right Threw: Right

MLB debut
- May 5, 1905, for the Detroit Tigers

Last MLB appearance
- July 1, 1905, for the Detroit Tigers

MLB statistics
- Win–loss record: 0–1
- Earned run average: 5.66
- Strikeouts: 20
- Stats at Baseball Reference

Teams
- Detroit Tigers (1905)

Eugene Wyman Ford (April 16, 1881 – August 23, 1973) was a Canadian professional baseball player. He was a right-handed pitcher who appeared in Major League Baseball (MLB) during 1905 with the Detroit Tigers. With Detroit, he compiled a 0–1 record, with a 5.66 earned run average, and 20 strikeouts in 35 innings pitched. Ford also played professionally in several minor leagues between 1902 and 1908.

His brother Russ Ford was also a major-league pitcher.
