= Wasaga Beach =

- Town (lower-tier)
- Town of Wasaga Beach
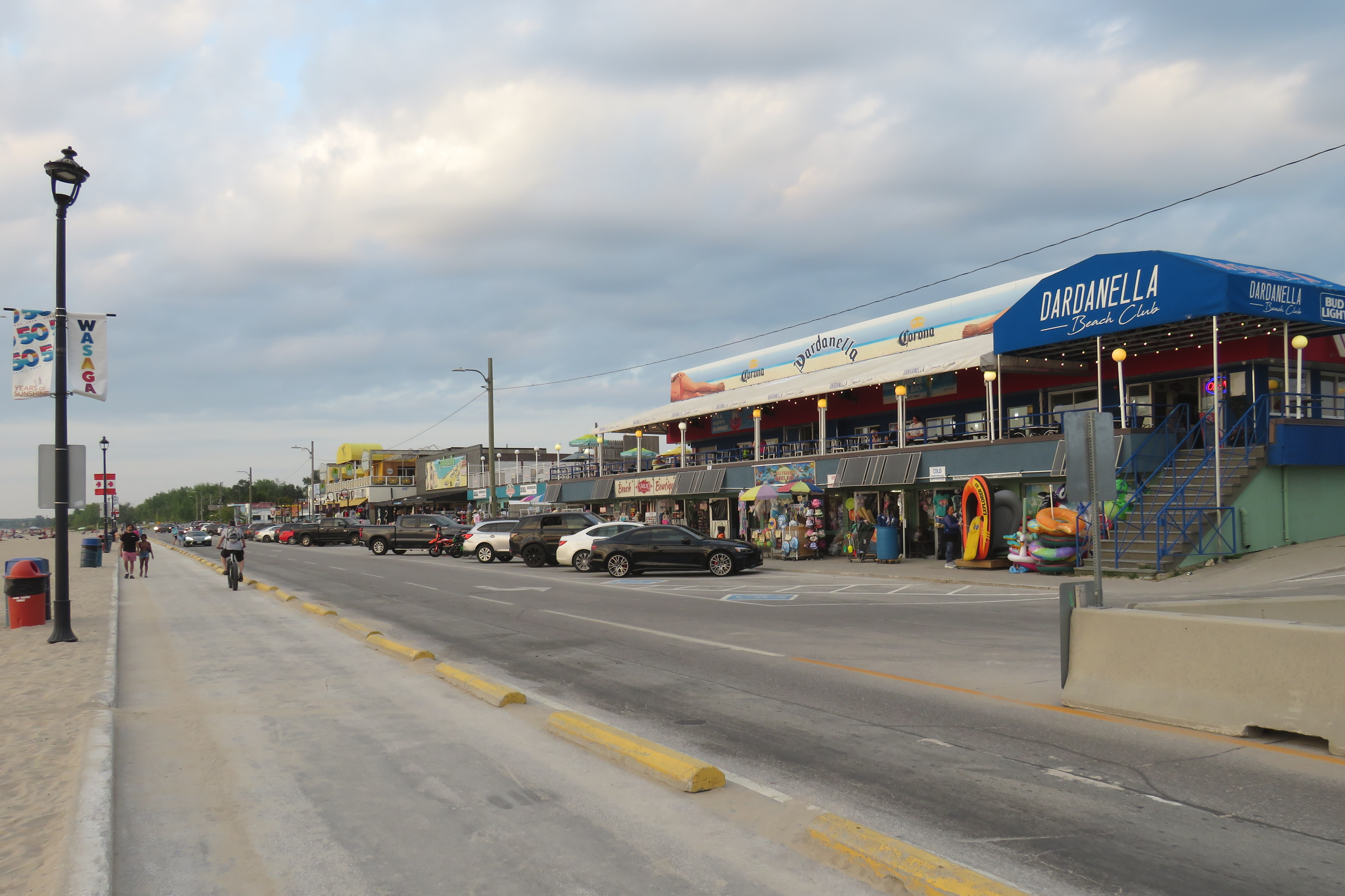
- Beach One in August 2024, the final summer before demolition of the beachfront stores for redevelopment
- Nicknames: “The Beach”, “Wasaga”
- Motto: "More To Explore"
- Location within Simcoe County Location within Southern Ontario
- Coordinates: 44°31′14″N 80°01′00″W
- Country: Canada
- Province: Ontario
- County: Simcoe
- Incorporated: 1951 (as village); January 1, 1974 (as town)

Government
  - Mayor: Brian Smith
  - Deputy Mayor: Tanya Snell
  - MPs: Terry Dowdall (CPC)
  - MPPs: Brian Saunderson (PC)

Area
  - Land: 57.42 km^{2} (22.17 sq mi)
  - Urban: 28.21 km^{2} (10.89 sq mi)

Population (2021)
  - Total: 24,862
  - Density: 433/km^{2} (1,120/sq mi)
  - Urban: 22,194
  - Urban density: 786.8/km^{2} (2,038/sq mi)
- Demonym(s): Wasaga Beacher, Wasagan
- Time zone: UTC-5 (EST)
  - Summer (DST): UTC-4 (EDT)
- Postal code FSA: L9Z
- Area code: 705
- Website: www.wasagabeach.com

Wasaga Beach (or simply Wasaga) is a town in Simcoe County, Ontario, Canada. Situated along the longest freshwater beach in the world, it is a popular summer tourist destination. It is located at the southern end of Nottawasaga Bay (a sub-bay of Georgian Bay) approximately 150 km (93 mi) north of Toronto and about 40 km (25 mi) northwest of Barrie. To the west, Collingwood and The Blue Mountains also attract visitors much of the year. The town is situated along a very long sandy beach partly between the bay and the Nottawasaga River. The beaches are part of Wasaga Beach Provincial Park; the park area totals 168 hectares (420 acres). Wasaga Beach has a year-round population of 24,862 as of 2021, but during the summer months the population increases with many seasonal residents.

The economy has struggled for some years, particularly since a major fire in late November 2007 destroyed many of the stores. It depends on tourists in an area where the primary shopping season is three to four months per year. In March 2017, the town passed its Downtown Development Master Plan, a 20-year strategy for significant redevelopment of the tourist area and adding a downtown to the business area. The goal is to improve tourism, diversify the economy, and get beyond its "party town" image.

== History ==
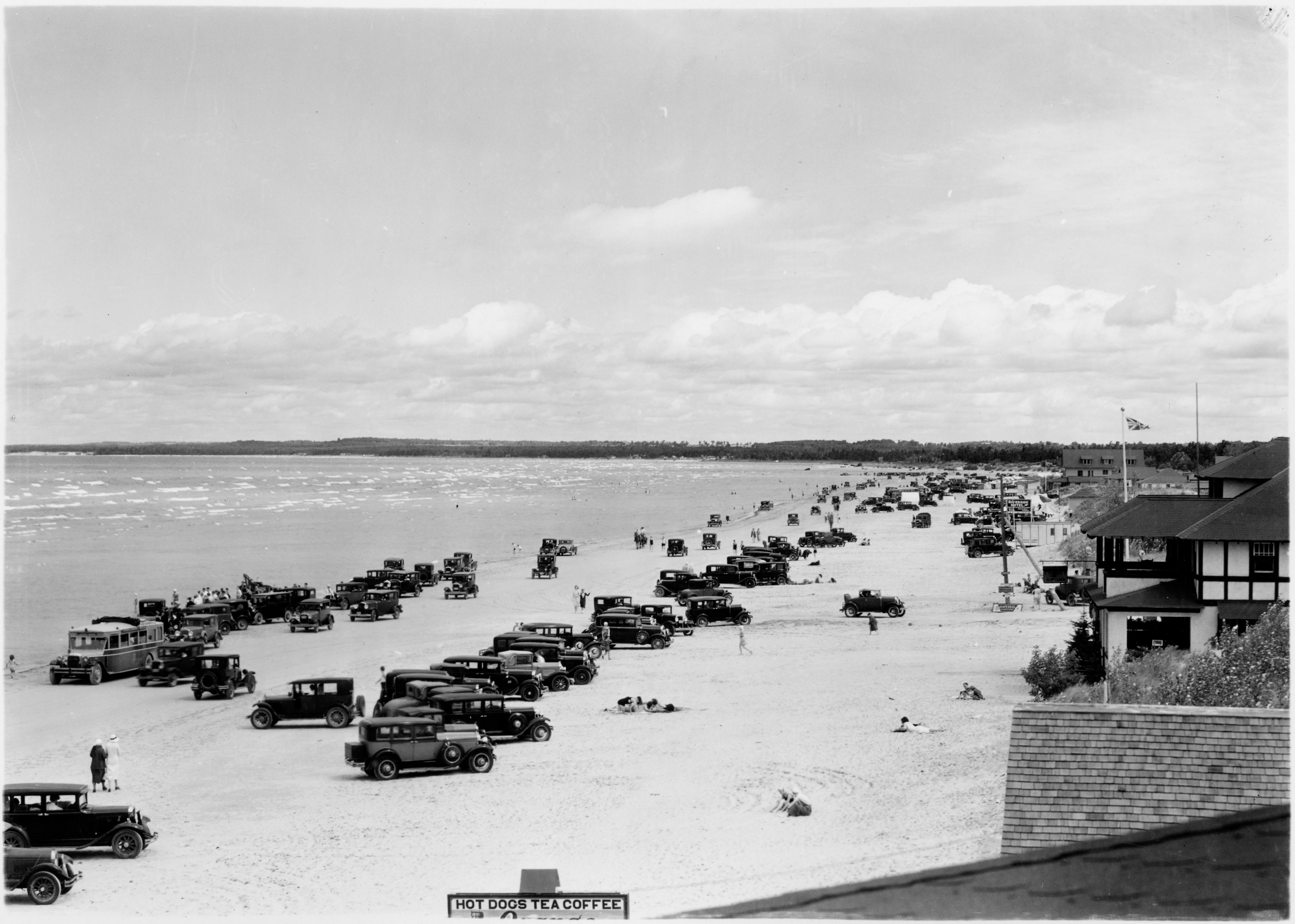
Automobiles parked on the beach (c. 1925)

Wasaga Beach and the surrounding area was inhabited by the Huron-Wendat Nation for centuries before they were conquered and driven from their ancestral lands in 1649 by the Iroquois Haudenosaunee (Known as the Five Nation Iroquois Confederacy). Wasaga is a contraction of the Algonquin word Nottawasaga. Nottawa means "Iroquois" and saga means "mouth of the river"; the word "Nottawasaga" was used by Algonquin scouts as a warning if they saw Iroquois raiding parties approaching their villages.

In 1812 the United States declared war on Great Britain and invaded Upper Canada on several occasions. Wasaga Beach became a strategic location at the mouth of the Nottawasaga River leading to Fort Willow and the Nine Mile Portage which was part of the supply line for British forces in the War of 1812 to Fort Michilimackinac and points to the north and west. The Royal Navy schooner HMS Nancy was scuttled in the Nottawasaga River to prevent the Americans from capturing her and her stores.

Lumbering was the main industry for the remainder of the 19th century. Logs were floated downriver and into the bay, gathered at ports to feed local saw mills.

Because Wasaga Beach had sandy soil unsuitable for cultivation, it did not attract early European settlement. In the 1820s the first sign of settlement in the area began as John Goessman surveyed Flos Township. In 1826, land was being sold for four shillings an acre. Though unsuitable for farming, the Wasaga Beach area had an abundance of trees. In the late 1830s and throughout the rest of the century, the logging industry was key to the economy and integral to development of the area. The first permanent settler was John Van Vlack, who arrived in 1869 and founded a settlement on the south side of the Nottawasaga River near its mouth and named it after himself. In 1872, a wooden bridge, the Vanvlack Bridge, was constructed east of the present Main Street bridge to provide access to the beach, then used mainly as a road. The name Wasaga Beach was first used in the area in the late 19th Century.

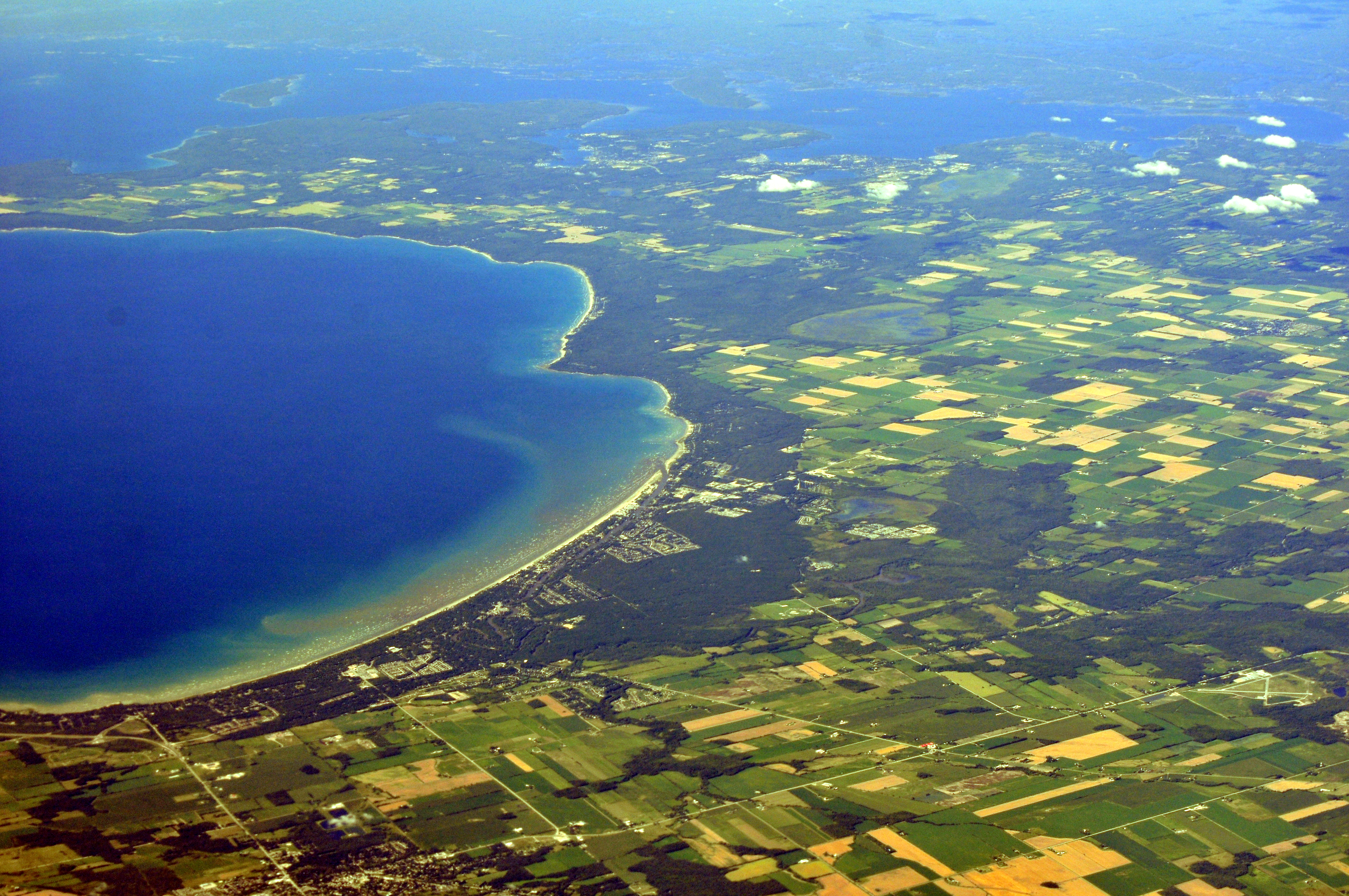
Aerial view of Wasaga Beach from the southwest

During the 1900s, families began to discover the beauty of the area. The beach gradually became a place for family picnics and holidays during the summer months, and the first cottages were built. In 1909, a new steel bridge was constructed to replace the Vanvlack Bridge. Wasaga Beach had its beginning as a major resort area when the first beachfront hotel, The Capstan Inn, was opened in 1915 by entrepreneur John McLean in what would later develop into the present Beach One area. In 1918, he opened the Dardanella Dance Hall, and over the next several decades more hotels, venues, and amusements would open. During the 1940s, servicemen stationed at Base Borden, a nearby military base, visited Wasaga Beach's amusement park (named Playland), and they made Wasaga Beach known across the country. After the war, Wasaga Beach continued to be a popular place for cottagers and day trippers. However, most of the attractions would subsequently close down, with Playland ceasing operations in 1985. Two water parks, both named Waterworld, opened that year, with Blue Mountain resorts first constructing the Waterslides at beach area 1 with Waterworld taking over. The main park closed at the end of the 2007 summer season whilst the beach area 1 park closed in 2006 and subsequently being demolished due to multiple cost issues, with the location at Beach One converted into a splash pad, which was itself later closed and turned into a performance space.

Wasaga Beach entered history's headlines in 1934. It was the site of departure for the first overseas flight from mainland Canada across the Atlantic Ocean to England. A plane, named Trail of the Caribou, used the beach as a makeshift runway.

The town was originally referred to as "the northern border of Flos, Sunnidale and Nottawasaga Townships". The first municipal reference occurred with a designation of a Local Improvement District in 1947. In 1949, Wasaga Beach was classified as a police village within Sunnidale Township, and was incorporated as a village in 1951.

In 1959, the beach was designated as a "Crown beach", which was the precursor to the establishment of Wasaga Beach Provincial Park. The province began expropriating beachfront properties to create a continuous belt of parkland along the full length of the beach, save for keeping part of the main beach area for commercial uses. This proved controversial; so the province scaled down plans and settled for separated park areas, which are today's Beach Areas 2–6. Driving and parking on the beach was previously permitted and popular, but in 1973 the province took cars off the beach. However, a paved beachfront street, Beach Drive, was constructed along Beach 1 shortly thereafter.

Wasaga Beach's later 20th Century growth was largely due to it absorbing many nearby smaller beach communities strung out along the bay: In 1966, the village annexed the adjacent Oakview Beach from Sunnidale Township. On January 1, 1974, Wasaga Beach was incorporated as a town and annexed additional beach communities such Springhurst Beach (also from Sunnidale), New Wasaga Beach, and Brock's Beach from Flos and Nottawasaga Townships respectively. That year, the permanent population stood at 4,034, a dramatic increase from 1965, when 500 people were residents.

The last expansion took place in 1994, when Bower's Beach was annexed from Nottawasaga Township. Today, the town has 24,862 full-time residents and 16,000 seasonal and part-time residents.

=== 2007 Beach One fire ===
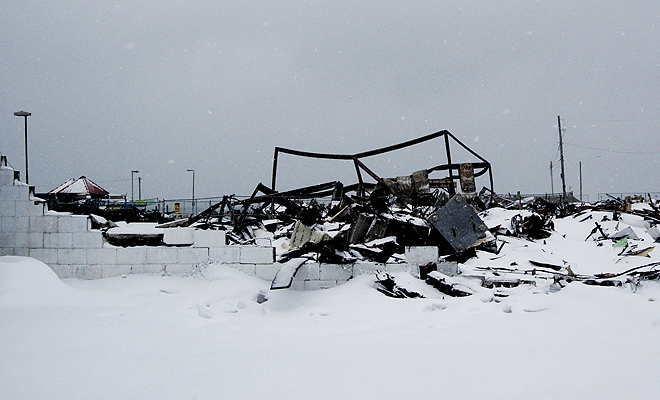
Aftermath of the Beach One fire

On November 30, 2007, a major fire destroyed 90 per cent of the buildings along the street mall in the Beach One area. About 17 seasonal businesses were said to have been affected, including bikini shops, ice cream parlours, a restaurant, a motel, and an arcade. Nearly 100 firefighters, most from surrounding municipalities, battled the blaze for hours. The Toronto Star later reported that "Twenty-one businesses in eight buildings overlooking Georgian Bay were destroyed, causing an estimated $5 million in damages."

Controversy also arose over whether or not the fire was deliberately set in order to allow unobstructed progression with the planned development or whether it was simply an accident. Two young men (one from Barrie and the other from Springwater) were charged with arson, although there was no evidence that the fire was deliberately set to remove the old buildings in advance of planned development.

The Town of Wasaga Beach worked out a plan to help the remaining businesses open for the season but plans for hotels, a theme park and a monorail were cancelled. However, a new development plan (albeit with only a hotel initially) was released in January 2017.

=== New development plans ===
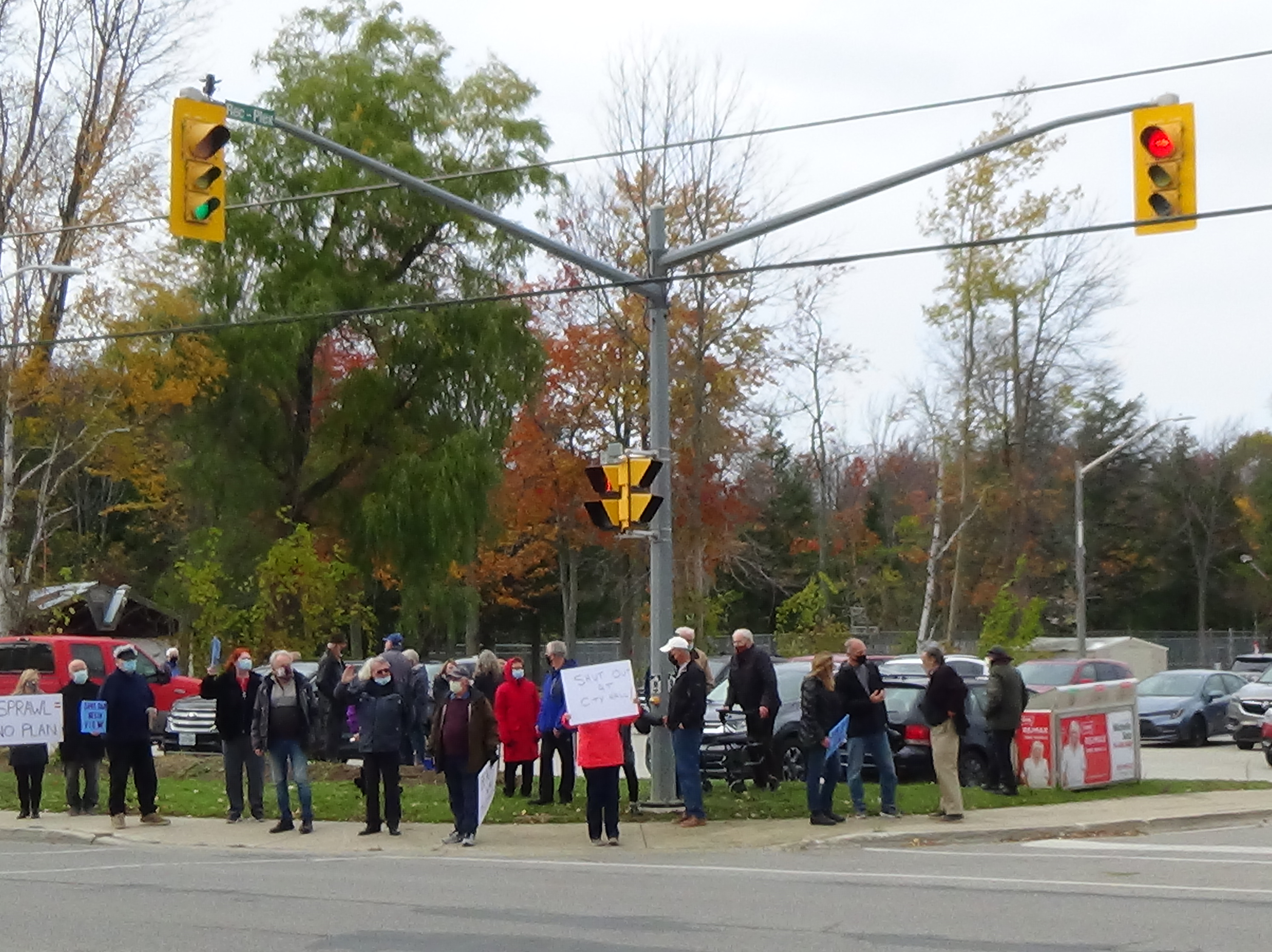
Wasaga Beach residents protesting Town development plans outside the RecPlex in October 2021

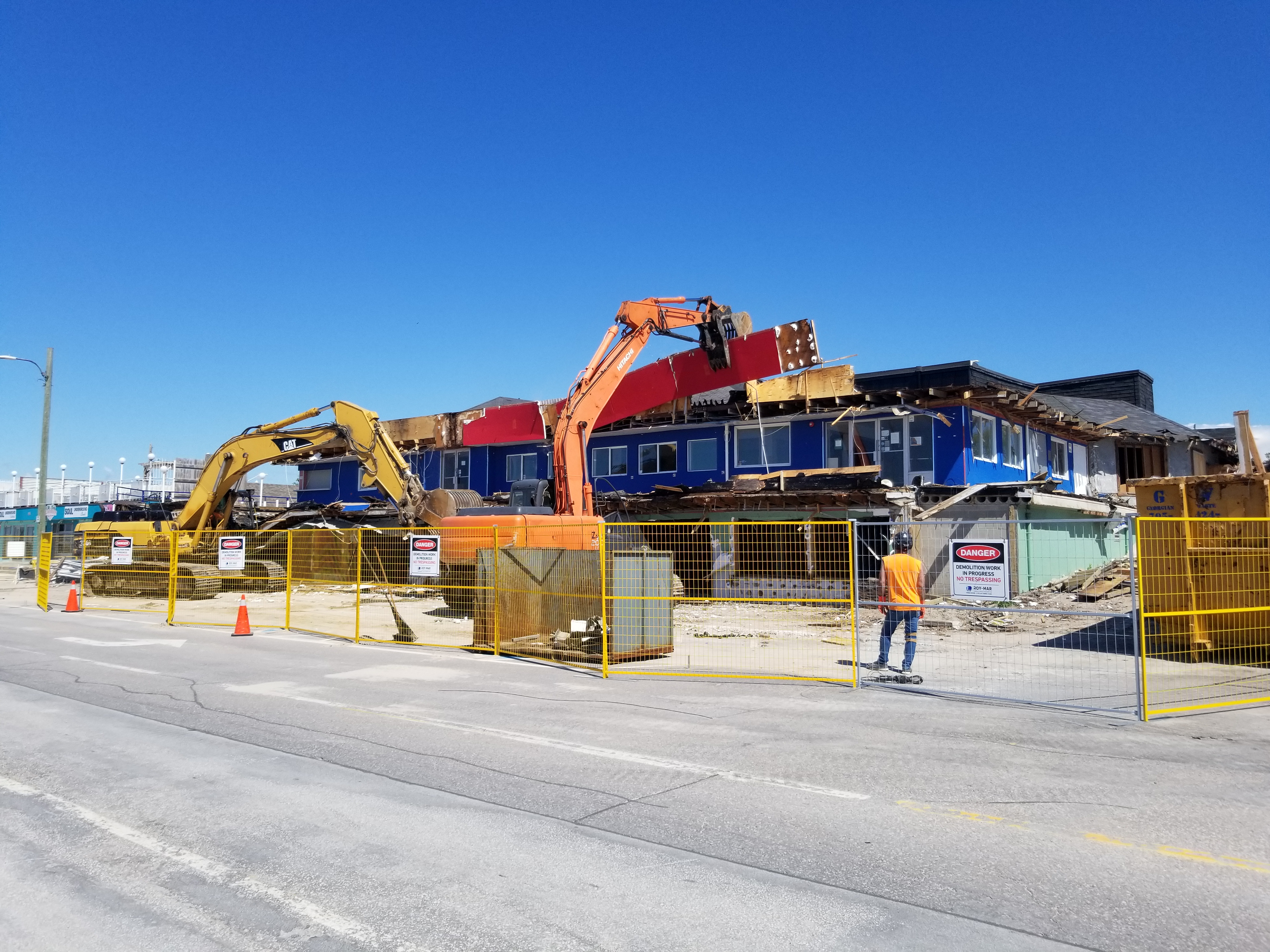
Demolition of old buildings at the main beach to make way for the beachfront redevelopment in May 2025

An entirely new Downtown Development Master Plan was released by town council in late January 2017, with an estimate for capital investment of $625 million and a 20 plus year time frame for completion. The first phase (five to 10 years) will cost about $200 million for two development areas, one on the beach and one across the river.

In July 2018, under the council led by then-mayor Brian Smith, council agreed to enter into a Letter of Intent with FRAM Building Group for the development of town-owned land in the downtown and at the beachfront.

In December 2018, under a new council, with Nina Bifolchi as mayor, council decided to undertake a review of the development of town-owned lands in the downtown and at the beachfront.

The council agreed to let the Letter of Intent the town had with FRAM Building Group Ltd. lapse at the end of December 2018 as a first step in the review process. The Downtown Master Plan, however, remained in place. In March 2019, FRAM advised the town it was not interested in being a part of future development of the beachfront. The town began looking for other developers interested in developing town-owned land at the beachfront.

In September 2021, the Wasaga Beach Ratepayers Association opposed the scope of what they perceived to be excessively high densities in the development plans, and the association's president was accused by the Town of spreading false information and exaggerating said densities, as well as claiming residents were being shut out of Town Hall. This led to residents protesting in October.

By June 2024, the years-long plan for the beachfront redevelopment was finally approved, and was unveiled at a public meeting attended by hundreds at the RecPlex on June 20 by Mayor Brian Smith (during his second term) and the project leader from FRAM Building Group – who had initially pulled out of the project in 2019 before rejoining – and Sunray Group of Hotels. In 2025, most of the old buildings along Beach Drive were demolished, and development of the first phase began that June with the construction of townhomes and retail space, with a Marriott hotel set to break ground in 2026.

=== Reconstruction of Beach Drive ===
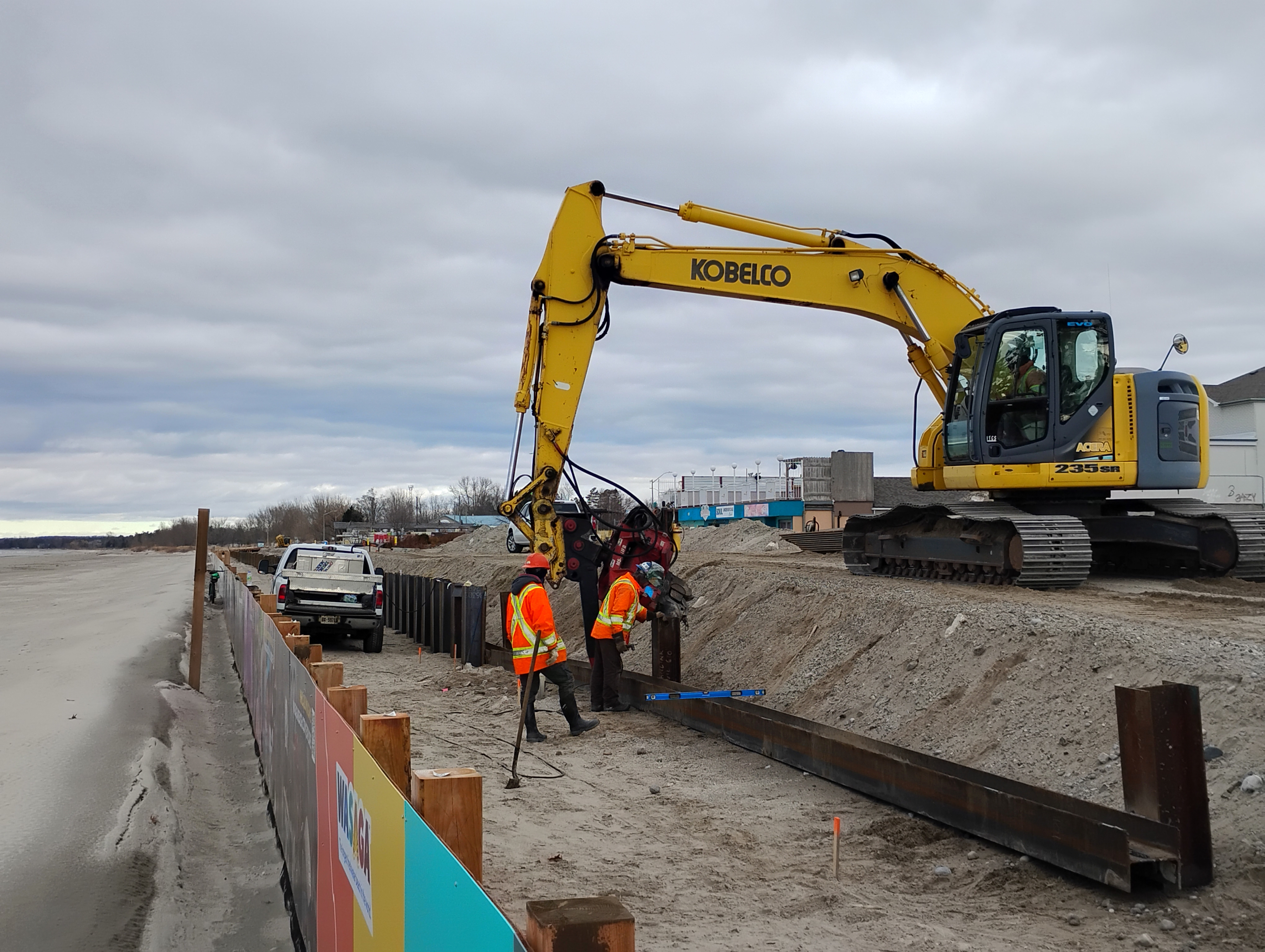
Reconstruction of Beach Drive in November 2025

Construction also began in 2025 to reconstruct Beach Drive by raising the road 5 feet (1.5 metres) above the beach level to avoid flooding issues during periods of high water levels, with the last time this having occurred being between 2020 and 2022, when it was closed and covered in sand as a result of this (and by beachgoers ignoring physical-distancing protocols on the narrowed beach during the COVID-19 pandemic). The construction is still ongoing into the summer of 2026.

== Geography ==
A cottage-lined side street

The Town of Wasaga Beach covers an area of 61.13 square kilometres (23.60 sq mi) composed predominantly of sand and loamy sand that exhibit excessive to good drainage and irregular to moderately sloping topography. The poor soil quality makes it difficult to sustain lush lawns in the town. The Canada Land Inventory for Agriculture rates the lands as predominately Class Six and Seven with primary restrictions of adverse topography, erosion damage and low natural fertility.

Wasaga Beach is also a major "cottage country" town with many seasonal residents. An unusual aspect of the town compared to other such communities in Ontario is that most of the cottages are non-waterfront and are closely spaced on a network of side streets within the town itself (mostly between Mosley Street and the bay), rather than being located on larger lots in more rustic settings, often well outside the resort towns as is the typical case elsewhere. Due to this aspect of its history, older residential areas also typically have a dispersed, "woodsy" character, although more recent developments are suburban in nature.

== Demographics ==
In the 2021 Census of Population conducted by Statistics Canada, Wasaga Beach had a population of 24,862 living in 10,811 of its 13,768 total private dwellings, a change of 20.3% from its 2016 population of 20,675. With a land area of 57.42 km^{2} (22.17 sq mi), it had a population density of 433.0/km^{2} (1,121.4/sq mi) in 2021.

Canada census – Wasaga Beach community profile

	2021	2016	2011
Population	24,862 (+20.3% from 2016)	20,675 (17.9% from 2011)	17,537 (16.7% from 2006)
Land area	57.42 km^{2} (22.17 sq mi)	58.64 km^{2} (22.64 sq mi)
Population density	433.0/km^{2} (1,121/sq mi)	352.6/km^{2} (913/sq mi)	300.1/km^{2} (777/sq mi)
Median age	56.4 (M: 55.2, F: 57.2)	55.3 (M: 54.3, F: 56.2)
Private dwellings	13,768 (total) 10,811 (occupied)	12,516 (total) 9,005 (occupied)	11,645 (total)
Median household income	$76,000	$62,150

References: 2021 2016 2011

The 2006 Canadian census indicated a population of 15,029 residents. When compared to its 2001 population of 12,419, Wasaga Beach was one of the fastest-growing communities in Canada, based on population growth percentage (21.0% over 5 years).

Historical census populations – Wasaga Beach

Year	Pop.	±%
1951	387	—
1956	529	+36.7%
1961	431	−18.5%
1966	1,382	+220.6%
1971	1,923	+39.1%
1976	4,985	+159.2%
1981	4,705	−5.6%
1986	5,124	+8.9%

Year	Pop.	±%
1991	6,224	+21.5%
1996	8,698	+39.7%
2001	12,419	+42.8%
2006	15,234	+22.7%
2011	17,537	+15.1%
2016	20,675	+17.9%
2021	24,862	+20.3%

Includes corrections and updates for 2006. Population counts are not adjusted for boundary changes.
Source: Statistics Canada

== Economy ==
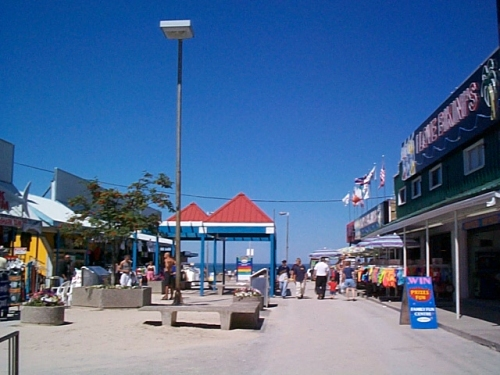
Main Street Mall as it appeared in August 2000. Fire destroyed most of the buildings in November 2007.

Despite the major fire, the beach and the remaining businesses reopened the following summer. Although the destroyed buildings had been considered dated, they were missed by residents and visitors. In 2008, an entertainment dome was built, intended as a temporary structure until development started. It lasted until February 2011 when the exterior cover was destroyed during a storm; repairs were not done and the dome never reopened. The structure was removed in May 2012.

The long-term plans after the fire, by Armand and Dov Levy's Blue Beach Avenue corporation, included a rebuild of the area in a modern style with shopping and the aforementioned indoor/outdoor theme park, two major hotels and monorail. The proposed development came to an abrupt end when Blue Beach Avenue declared bankruptcy in 2010. "The past couple of years haven't been kind to the tourist industry ... So I gather there were some major cash shortfalls that put them in this situation," the town's mayor said at that time. Armand Levy was subsequently charged with fraud in 2012 after an investigation of misappropriation of the insurance money paid out after the 2007 fire but was ultimately acquitted.

Reduced tourism, partly because of the loss of many retail buildings, has continued to be a problem in the area. The majority of sales take place during the tourist season, which is typically not much longer than three months per year. (The most recent stats indicate a decline in tourism "of roughly 100,000 a year between 2002 and 2012".)

To step up development, in 2015 the town spent $13.5 million to purchase seven properties, including eight buildings and 28 rental units, along Beach Area One, becoming a landlord to some businesses, including three bars. The town acquired any existing leases from tenants and succeeded in leasing most of the empty space to commercial enterprises by July 2016. A few of the tenants subsequently enquired about the possibility of breaking their leases because they were struggling financially. The town council agreed to a one-time opportunity for businesses to break their leases without a penalty; requests to do so had to be submitted no later than September 23, 2016.

The beach is the town's primary attraction. Of the six main beach areas, Beach areas One and Two and the adjacent private/public lands have historically functioned as the main destination for tourism activity. Due to the economic climate, losses due to the fire, and a series of failed private redevelopment plans (until the present plan; see section below), Beach areas One and Two have been in steady decline.

The town undertook a community visioning exercise, called Opportunity Wasaga, to develop a long-term vision for the future of the public and private lands in this area.

There has been a great deal of controversy (among the public and council members) about the previous strategies used by the Town of Wasaga Beach, including the 2015 purchase of the seven properties for $13.8 million, using borrowed money. "That's no small sum for the town of 18,000 that will collect $20.3 million in property taxes this year and spend $48 million in operating and capital costs," according to a report by the Toronto Star.

== Attractions ==
Wasaga Beach Provincial Park had 1,693,731 visitors in 2022, making it the most-visited operating provincial park in Ontario.

=== Casino ===
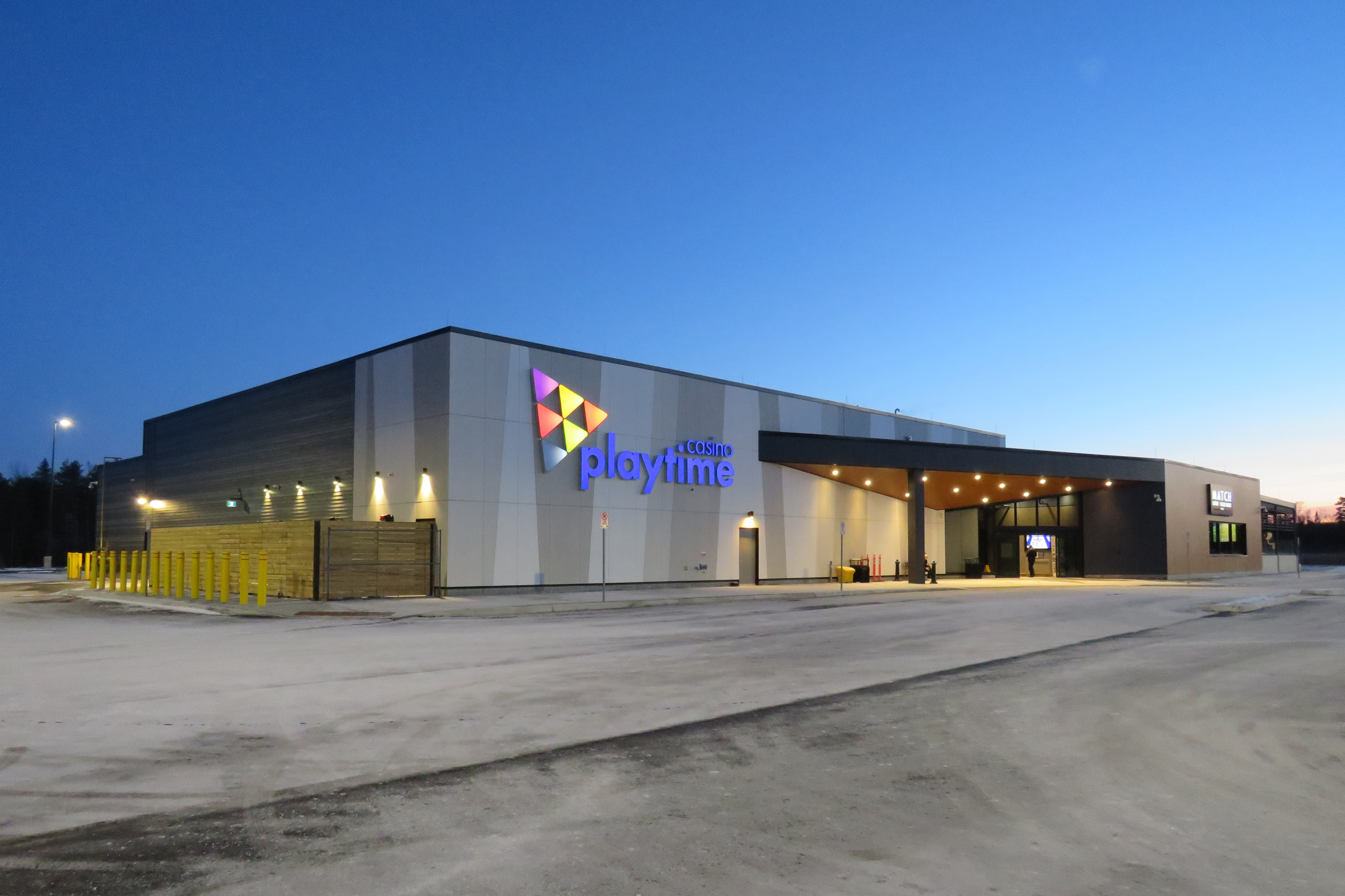
Playtime Casino Wasaga

The Playtime Casino Wasaga on Mosley Street in the town's west end opened on November 23, 2022. The casino was first proposed in March 2018 by the Ontario Lottery and Gaming Corporation who selected Gateway Casinos to operate a casino in the South Georgian Bay area, and Wasaga Beach was selected as the location in October of that year.

Between April 16 and May 1, 2023, the casino was closed due to Gateway Casinos being the victim of a cyberattack, which resulted in the closure of all its casinos in Ontario.

In August 2025, site preparation began for the construction of a Hampton Inn hotel and a new retail zone adjacent to the casino. The retail will be constructed as a later phase that will include Wasaga Beach's second McDonald's location and a Circle K gas station.

=== Civic facilities ===
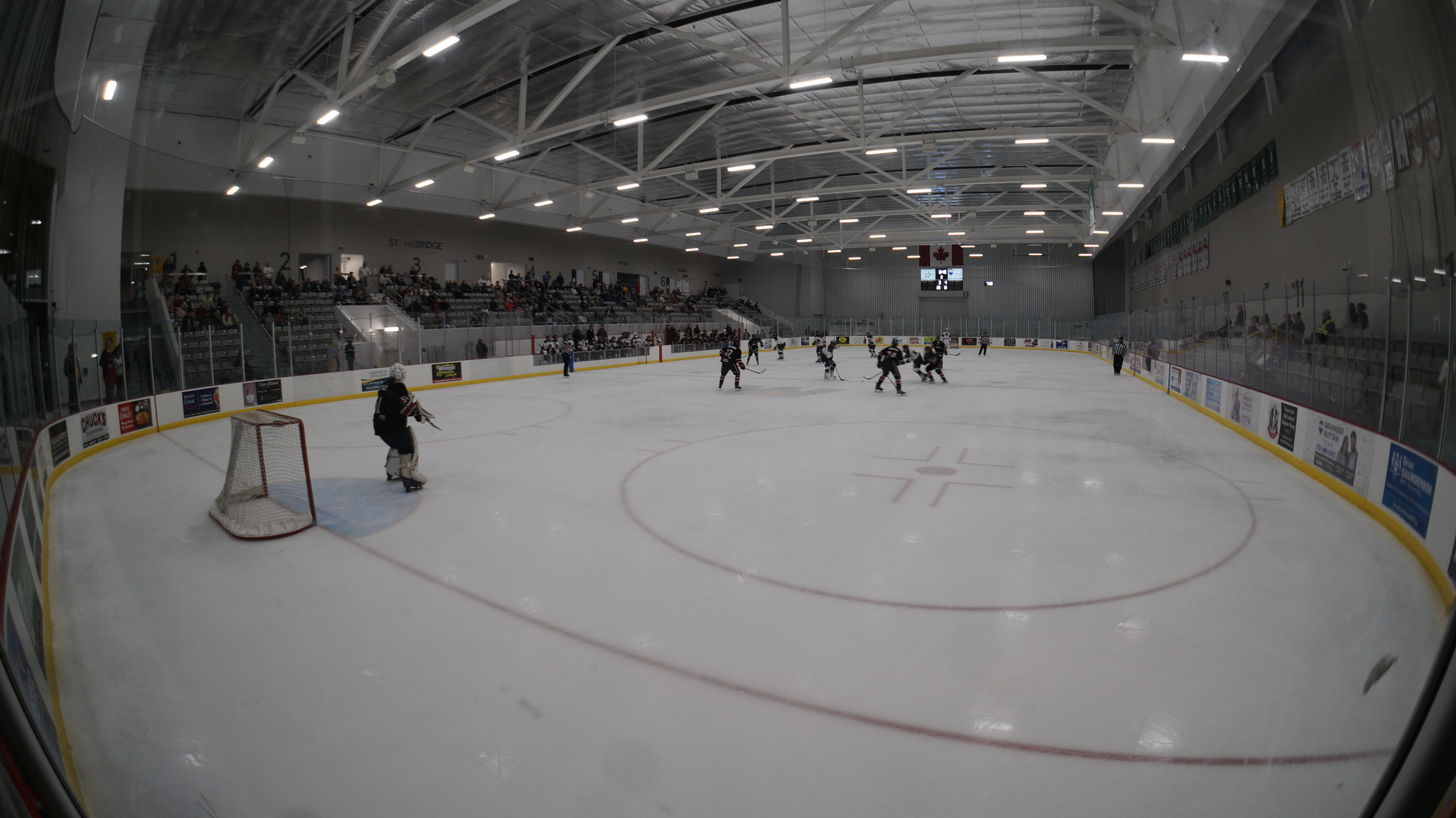
Wasaga Stars Arena

The town has a large community centre; the RecPlex, which has an auditorium, an amphitheatre and a YMCA. There is also the Wasaga Stars Arena, which contains twin-pad hockey rinks. It began construction in September 2021 on the former main Waterworld site and opened on January 27, 2024, replacing an older single-rink facility.

The arena building is also home to the third relocation of the Wasaga Beach Public Library.

== Transportation ==
=== Wasaga Beach Transit ===
Wasaga Beach Transit provides transit service in the town. It is operated by Sinton-Landmark Bus Lines, using town-owned buses. The service was started with one route in July 2008, then operated by Georgian Coach Lines, and quickly expanded to two routes in the summer of 2009. Route 1 runs from Walmart in the east to the Playtime Casino in the west every 90 minutes, and Route 2 runs from the old Wasaga Stars Arena in the east to 70th Street in the west every hour, with both routes operating from 7 am to 9 pm; including weekends and holidays (except Christmas). Route 1 originally continued east to Archer Road, but on November 6, 2023, the portion of east of Walmart was changed to an on-demand service format, with booking required in advance.

=== Simcoe County LINX ===
Simcoe County LINX connects Wasaga Beach with two routes running to Barrie (Route 2) and Collingwood (Route 4); with transfers with both Wasaga Beach Transit routes made at the Real Canadian Superstore. It has separate fares from Wasaga Beach Transit and there are no free transfers.

== Education ==
There are four schools in Wasaga Beach: Birchview Dunes Elementary School, St. Noel Chabanal Catholic Elementary School, Wasaga Beach Public School, and Worsley Elementary School. The town has no secondary school, and buses transport over 760 students to high schools located in the nearby communities of Stayner, Elmvale, and Collingwood. However, in 2024 and 2025, the construction of two high schools for Wasaga Beach, one public and one separate (Catholic), were announced, with preparation of both sites underway as of October 2025. The first is scheduled to open in September 2027 at the intersection of River Road West and Theme Park Drive.

== Notable residents ==
- Jason Arnott – NHL hockey player; born in Collingwood and raised in Wasaga Beach; in the summer of 2000, Jason Arnott Day was declared in Wasaga Beach to celebrate his Stanley-Cup-winning goal scored in double overtime. An art piece of the 2000 Stanley Cup Final can be seen at the Wasaga Stars Arena.

== See also ==
- List of communities in Ontario
- List of beaches in Canada
