= Airlie (surname) =

Airlie is a surname. Notable people with the surname include:

- Andrew Airlie (born 1961), Canadian actor
- Catherine Airlie, pseudonym of the novelist Jean S. MacLeod
- Ella Airlie (1882–1959), Australian dramatist and performer
- Jimmy Airlie (1936–1997), Scottish trade unionist
- Seton Airlie (1920–2008), Scottish footballer
