= Bighead River =

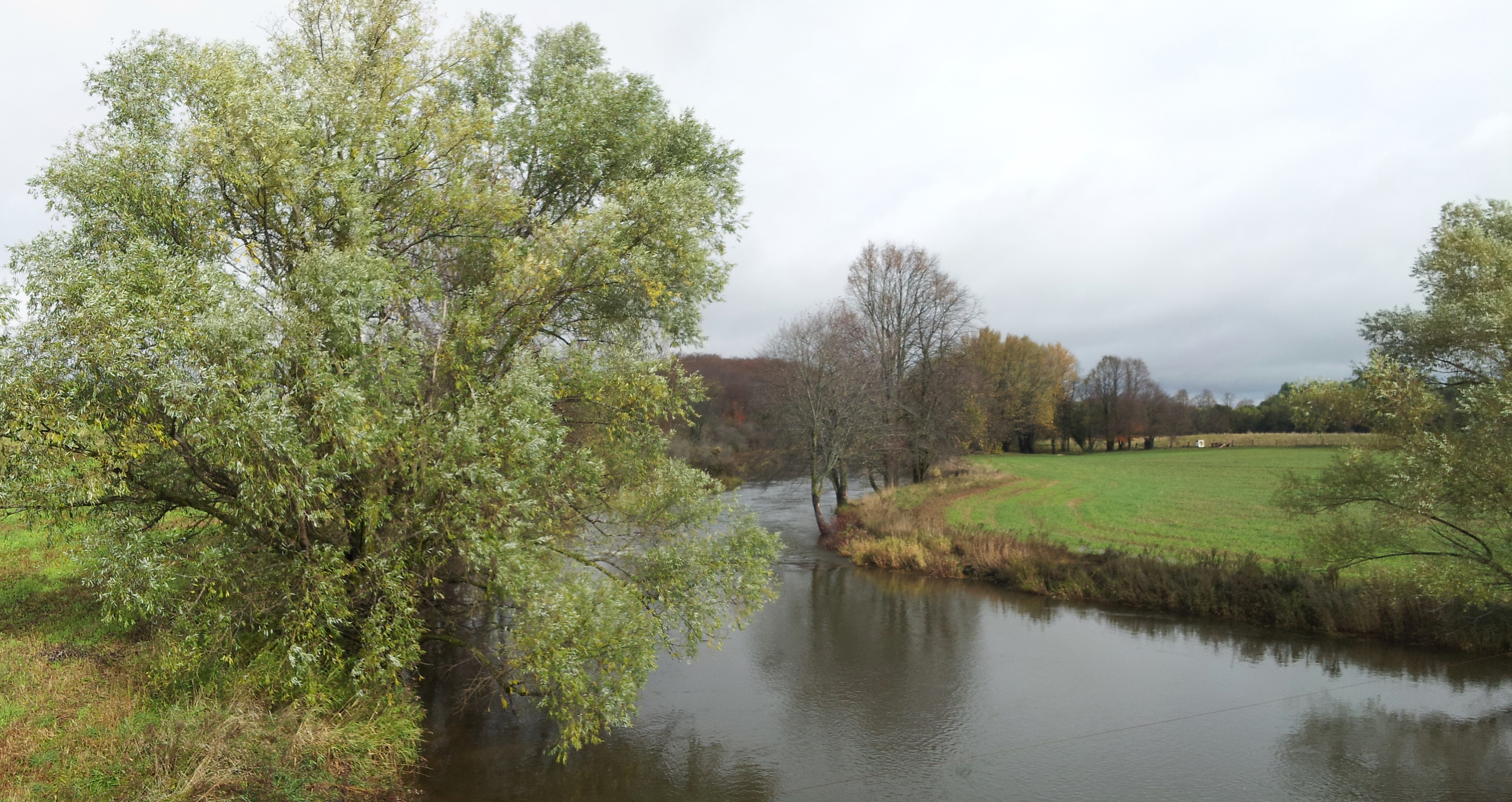
- Photograph of Bighead River in mid-April
- Interactive map of Bighead River

Location
- Country: Canada
- Province: Ontario
- County: Grey
- Municipalities: Chatsworth; Meaford

Physical characteristics
- Source: Forest
  - location: Chatsworth
  - coordinates: 44°24′56″N 80°50′21″W
  - elevation: 328 m (1,076 ft)
- Mouth: Lake Huron
  - location: Meaford
  - coordinates: 44°36′28″N 80°35′21″W
  - elevation: 176 m (577 ft)

Basin features
- River system: Great Lakes Basin
- Tributaries
  - right: East Minniehill Creek, Minniehill Creek, Rocklyn Creek, Walters Creek

The Bighead River is a river in Grey County in southern Ontario, Canada, that flows from the Niagara Escarpment between the communities along Ontario Highway 10 of Arnott and Holland Centre in the township of Chatsworth to empty into Nottawasaga Bay, an inlet of Georgian Bay on Lake Huron, at Meaford.

The river crosses the Bruce Trail in the valley between the Spey River Forest Area and the Walters Falls Conservation Area.

== Tributaries ==
- East Minniehill Creek (right)
- Minniehill Creek (right)
- Rocklyn Creek (right)
- Walters Creek (right)

== See also ==
- List of rivers of Ontario

== Sources ==
- "Bighead River". Geographical Names Data Base. Natural Resources Canada.
- "Toporama - Topographic Map Sheets 41A7, 41A10". Atlas of Canada. Natural Resources Canada. Archived from the original on February 10, 2010.
