= Wasaga Beach Provincial Park =

Provincial park of Ontario, Canada

- IUCN category II (national park)
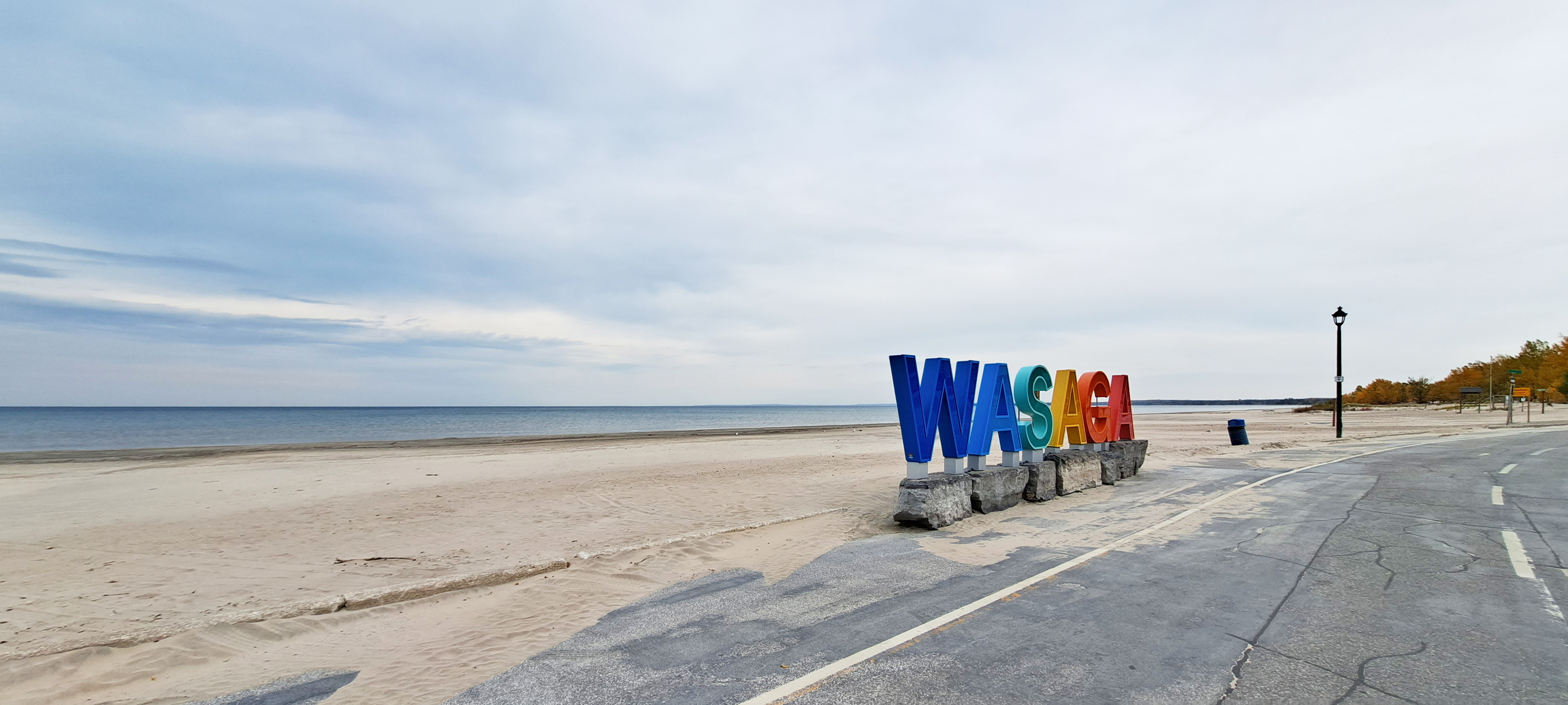

- Location within Southern Ontario
- Location: Wasaga Beach, Ontario, Canada
- Coordinates: 44°29′38″N 80°01′18″W
- Area: 1,844.30 ha (7.1209 sq mi)
- Established: 1959
- Visitors: 1,693,731 (in 2022)
- Governing body: Ontario Parks
- Website: www.ontarioparks.ca/park/wasagabeach

Wasaga Beach Provincial Park is a provincial park located on Georgian Bay at Wasaga Beach, Ontario, Canada. The beach (with the exception of a short separate area of private beaches in the extreme west end) is owned and operated by Ontario Parks as a recreational provincial park, consisting of the town's trademark beach, as well as other non-beach areas. Beach Areas 1–6 can be accessed off Mosley Street, while Allenwood and New Wasaga Beaches are northeast of the mouth of the Nottawasaga River and are accessed via River Road East.

The park is available for day use only. Its area totals 1,844 hectares (4,560 acres) of which 6.8 hectares (17 acres) are protected. The park is a habitat for birds, primarily for shorebirds including the endangered piping plover. In addition to the beach, there are over 50 kilometres (31 mi) of hiking trails. In winter, they are used for cross-country skiing and snowshoeing. The visitor centre provides access to the Nancy Island Historic Site with a theatre, a museum and a lighthouse.

It had 1,693,731 visitors in 2022, making it the most-visited operating provincial park in Ontario.

== Proposed transfer of portions of beach to municipality ==
In the summer of 2025, Ontario premier Doug Ford proposed transferring jurisdiction of Beach areas 1 and 2 and New Wasaga Beach to the town. The idea was controversial with residents and others and on August 24, 60 people (including Chris Glover, an MPP from Toronto) held a rally at Beach 1, claiming such a move "could open the door for the Ford government to sell off other provincial park spaces across Ontario".

In January 2026, the Ford government announced they will be proceeding with the transfer of the lands to the town. There has been concern over the environmental impacts, as well as legal and governance issues and public access. The town has committed to keeping the beach public, not building on it, and protecting the environmentally sensitive area of the dunes.
