= Nottawasaga Bay =

Bay in Ontario, Canada

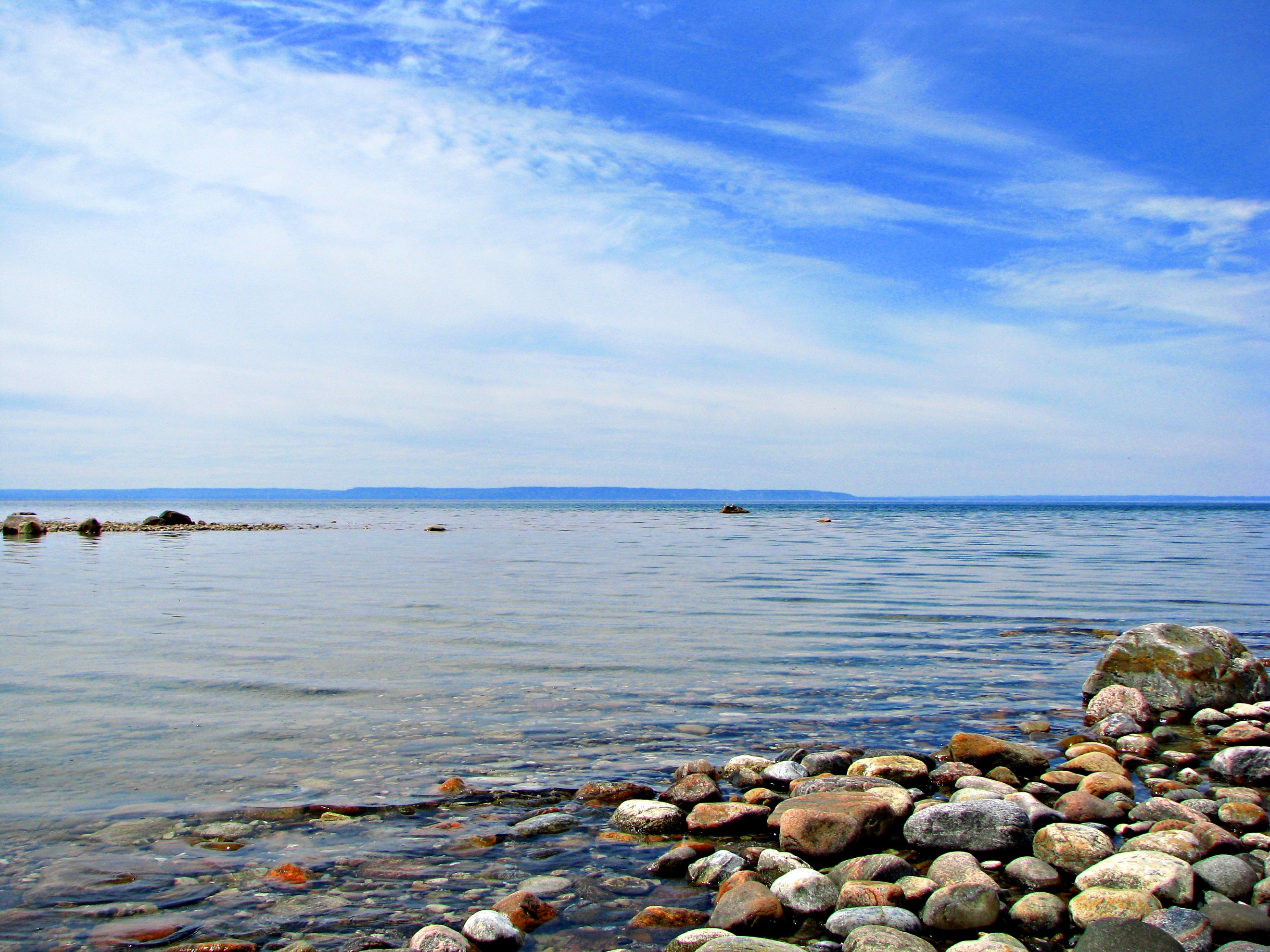
- Rocky shore on Nottawasaga Bay near Lafontaine

- Location within Southern Ontario
- Coordinates: 44°40′02″N 80°18′22″W
- Basin countries: Canada
- Settlements: Collingwood; The Blue Mountains; Meaford; Tiny; Wasaga Beach

Nottawasaga Bay is a sub-bay within Georgian Bay in Southern Ontario, Canada located at the southernmost end of the main bay. The communities located on Nottawasaga Bay are Meaford, The Blue Mountains, Collingwood, Wasaga Beach and Tiny.

The western shore of Nottawasaga Bay is determined by the Niagara Escarpment, which reaches Nottawasaga Bay between Collingwood and Thornbury. The southern shore is flat limestone plain, with cedar marshes. The Nottawasaga River flows into Georgian Bay near the southern end of the bay, and onward to the east the shore is predominantly sand dunes and marshes created by the strong predominant northwest winds. This part of Nottawasaga Bay is heavily built up with summer homes and provides an excellent fishing and spawning habitat. Nearer to Thornbury and the Beaver River Valley there are some vineyards; many apple orchards also dot the area. The bay is also home to one of six imperial towers, the Nottawasaga Lighthouse.

The river takes its name from the Ojibwe word "Nottawasaga". Nottawa (or Naadowe in modern orthography) means "Iroquoian" and saga (zaagi in modern orthography) means "mouth of the river"; the word "Nottawasaga" (Naddowe-zaagi in modern orthography) was used by Algonquin scouts as a warning if they saw Haudenosaunee raiding parties approaching their villages.

Thus, the name of the river, in Ojibwe, is Naadawe-zaagiing, "At the Iroquois River-mouth.

== Tributaries ==
(from west to east)

- Bighead River
- Beaver River
- Nottawasaga River

== History ==
In the early and mid-17th century, Nottawasaga Bay was adjacent to two indigenous First Nations territories: Wendake to the east, which was the territory of the Wendat or Huron people, and the "Petun Country" to the south, which was the land of the Petun, who were their close allies and relatives. In March 1649, during the Beaver Wars, Wendat refugees fled across the bay, which was frozen over with ice, to take refuge among the Petun.
