= Seton Airlie =

Scottish footballer (1920 – 2008)

Personal information
- Full name: Seton Montgomery Airlie
- Date of birth: 22 March 1920
- Place of birth: Carmyle, Scotland
- Date of death: 12 May 2008 (aged 88)
- Place of death: Worcester, England
- Position: Centre forward

Youth career
- Greyfriars
- 1939–1942: Celtic

Senior career*
| Years | Team | Apps | (Gls) |
| 1942–1947 | Celtic | 6 | (3) |
| 1947–1948 | Cannes | | |
| 1948–1950 | Worcester City | 24 | (8) |
| Total | | 30 | (11) |
- * Club domestic league appearances and goals

Seton Montgomery Airlie, also known as Jock Airlie (22 March 1920 – 12 May 2008) was a Scottish professional footballer who played as a centre forward.

== Career ==
Born in Carmyle, Airlie played in Scotland, France and England for Greyfriars, Celtic, Cannes and Worcester City.
