= Nottawasaga River =

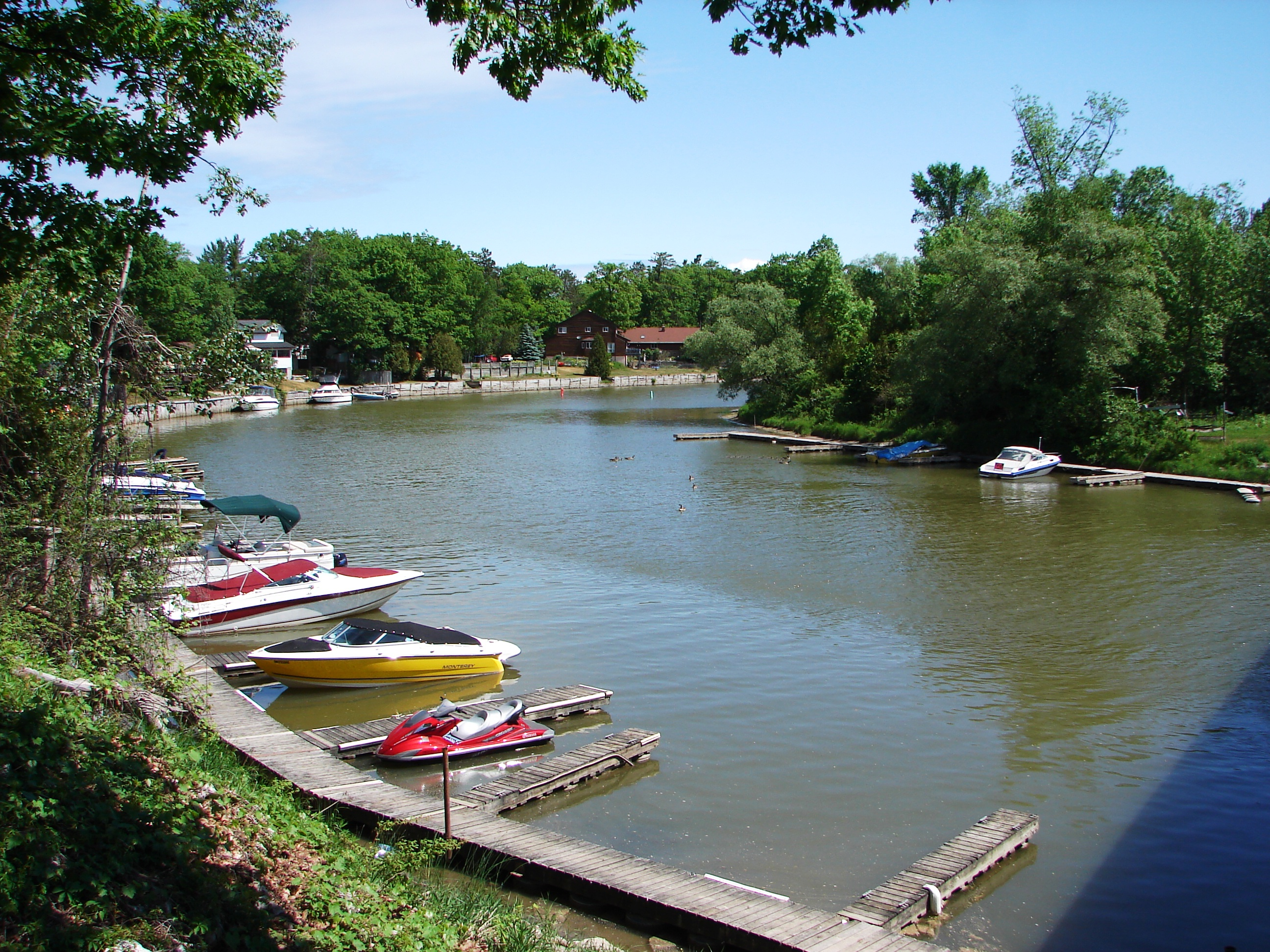
- The Nottawasaga River in Wasaga Beach

- Location of the mouth of the Nottawasaga River in southern Ontario
- Etymology: From the Algonquin words for "Iroquois" and "river outlet"
- Native name: Naadawe-zaaga-ziibi (Ojibwe)

Location
- Country: Canada
- Province: Ontario
- Region: Central Ontario
- Counties: Simcoe; Dufferin

Physical characteristics
- Source: Orangeville Reservoir
  - location: Orangeville, Dufferin County
  - coordinates: 43°56′29″N 80°05′29″W
  - elevation: 412 m (1,352 ft)
- Mouth: Nottawasaga Bay
  - location: Wasaga Beach, Simcoe County
  - coordinates: 44°32′12″N 80°00′29″W
  - elevation: 176 m (577 ft)
- Length: 120 km (75 mi)
- Basin size: 3,361 km^{2} (1,298 sq mi)

Basin features
- River system: Great Lakes Basin
- Tributaries
  - left: Boyne River

The Nottawasaga River is a river in Simcoe County and Dufferin County in Central Ontario, Canada. It is part of the Great Lakes Basin, and is a tributary of Lake Huron. The river flows from the Orangeville Reservoir in the town of Orangeville, Dufferin County, through the Niagara Escarpment and the Minesing Wetlands, the latter a wetland of international significance (Ramsar Convention site), and empties into Nottawasaga Bay, an inlet of Georgian Bay on Lake Huron, at the town of Wasaga Beach, Simcoe County.

The river takes its name from the Ojibwe word "Nottawasaga". Nottawa (or Naadowe in modern orthography) means "Iroquois" and saga (zaagi in modern orthography) means "mouth of the river"; the word "Nottawasaga" (Naddowe-zaagi in modern orthography) was used by Algonquin scouts as a warning if they saw Iroquois raiding parties approaching their villages.

Thus, the name of the river, in Ojibwe is Naadawe-zaaga-ziibi.

== Watershed ==
The Nottawasaga River's headwaters originate in the Niagara Escarpment, Simcoe Uplands, Oak Ridges Moraine and Oro Moraine. The watershed is shaped like a bowl, and the Nottawasaga River is the main river feeding the watershed.

The area of the drainage basin is 3,361 square kilometres (1,298 sq mi), and as well as Dufferin County and Simcoe County, is located in Grey County and the Regional Municipality of Peel.

== History ==
The Nottawasaga River is the resting home of HMS Nancy, a merchant schooner taken into the Royal Navy during the War of 1812. It met three American warships: USS Niagara, USS Tigress and USS Scorpion. The small ship lost the battle but Lt. Miller Worsley and crew escaped. They rowed 360 miles to Fort Michilimackinac and three days later, Worsley returned with 92 men to take the Tigress and Scorpion. Since her sinking, an island formed around the Nancy. The hull is now preserved in a museum at Nancy Island Historic Site which is a part of Wasaga Beach Provincial Park.

== Natural history ==
Fish ladders allow rainbow trout to reach spawning grounds on the upper river. The river is under the auspices of the Nottawasaga Valley Conservation Authority.

== Tributaries ==
- McIntyre Creek (left)
- Little Marl Creek (right)
- Marl Creek (right)
- Willow Creek (right)
- Mad River (left)
- Bear Creek (right)
- Pine River (left)
- Boyne River (left)
- Innisfil Creek (right)
- Sheldon Creek (left)

== Sources ==
- Map 3 (PDF) (Map). 1 : 700,000. Official road map of Ontario. Ministry of Transportation of Ontario. 2014.
- Map 4 (PDF) (Map). 1 : 700,000. Official road map of Ontario. Ministry of Transportation of Ontario. 2014.
- Map 5 (PDF) (Map). 1 : 700,000. Official road map of Ontario. Ministry of Transportation of Ontario. 2014.
- Restructured municipalities – Ontario map #6 (Map). Restructuring Maps of Ontario. Ontario Ministry of Municipal Affairs and Housing. 2006. Archived from the original on 2021-02-24.
- Watershed Map (PDF) (Map). 1 : 375,000. Nottawasaga Valley Conservation Authority.
