= Airlie, Ontario =

Airlie
- Unincorporated rural community
- Location within Ontario Location within Canada
- Coordinates: 44°15′40″N 80°00′30″W
- Country: Canada
- Province: Ontario
- County: Simcoe
- Township: Adjala–Tosorontio
- Time zone: UTC-5 (Eastern (EST))
  - Summer (DST): UTC-4 (EDT)
- GNBC Code: FABZL

Airlie is an unincorporated rural community in Simcoe County, Ontario, Canada.

Officially located in Adjala–Tosorontio Township, Airlie has historically been associated with both Mulmur Township and the former Tosorontio Township (now Adjala–Tosorontio Township) because it is located on the boundary between both townships.

== History ==
Airlie was founded in the 1860s. The early settlement was also known as "Bonny-Town" and "Mill Hill". A sawmill located at Airlie enabled it to prosper.

A post office opened in 1869, and mail was delivered daily.

During the 1870s and 1880s, Airlie had two stores, two blacksmith shops, three sawmills, and 12 houses. The Cherry Hotel was located at Airlie, owned by early settlers, the Cherry family. Two churches were built: St. James Episcopal Church in 1886, and Calvin Presbyterian Church in 1889. The population in 1890, and in 1908, was about 100. The settlement continued to prosper into the first decade of the 1900s.

Elijah Kidd, a resident of Airlie, served as deputy reeve and then reeve of Mulmur Township between 1913 and 1917.

In 1914, the post office closed.

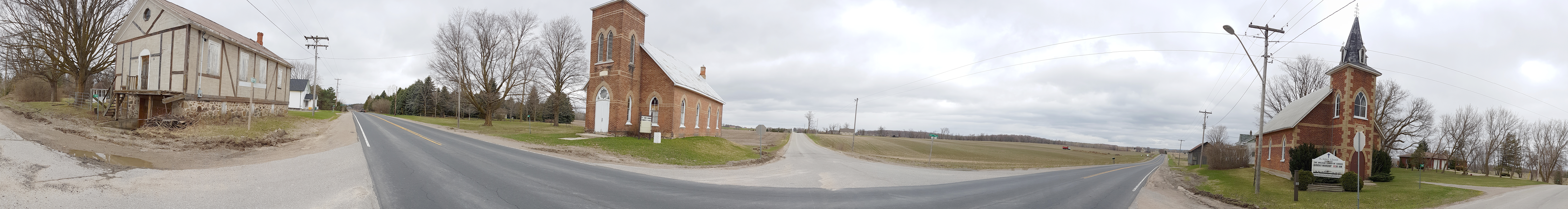
(From left to right): former Orange Hall, former Calvin Presbyterian Church (1889), and St. James Church (1886)
