= Beautiful Joe =

Book by Margaret Marshall Saunders

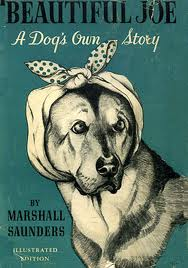
- Cover
- Author: Margaret Marshall Saunders
- Language: English
- Publication date: 1893

Beautiful Joe is an 1893 novel by Margaret Marshall Saunders which contributed to worldwide awareness of animal cruelty. The story is based on a dog of the same name from the town of Meaford, Ontario. It was the first Canadian book to sell over one million copies.

== The real Beautiful Joe ==
The real Beautiful Joe was an Airedale-type dog. He was medium-sized, brown, and described as likely being part Bull Terrier and part Fox Terrier. He was also described as a mongrel, a cur, and a mutt. He was originally owned by a local Meaford man, who cruelly abused the dog to the point of near death, and even cut off his ears and tail. Walter Moore, father of Louise Moore, rescued the dog in 1890, from what likely would have been a violent and painful death. In 1892, Margaret Marshall Saunders (1861–1947), first learned about Beautiful Joe when she visited her brother and his wife, Louise Moore. Saunders was so touched by Joe's story that she wrote a novel-length, fictionalized, autobiographical version of it, entitled Beautiful Joe. Margaret Saunders relocated the story to a small town in Maine and changed the family's name from Moore to Morris to win a literary contest sponsored by the American Humane Education Society. The book was first published in 1893. By 1900, over 800,000 copies sold in the U.S., 40,000 in Canada and 100,000 in the United Kingdom.

Saunders chose to write Beautiful Joe as an "autobiography" and tell the story from Beautiful Joe's viewpoint, and in her imagined version of Beautiful Joe's own words. While it was not the first book to tell a story from an animal's viewpoint – Black Beauty by Anna Sewell was already on its way to becoming classic literature by then – it was still an uncommon narrative device. This unusual viewpoint allowed the reader into Beautiful Joe's mind, and inarguably led the reader to feel more sympathy toward the narrator than if the material had been presented in a straightforward and documentative manner. Also, Saunders believed that she would not be taken seriously as a writer using the obviously female name Margaret Saunders, so she wrote using the variant name Marshall Saunders.

== Fame and legacy ==
Saunders submitted her story to a writing contest being run by the Humane Society in 1893. It won, and the following year it was published as a novel. The response was tremendous; both the book and its subject received worldwide attention. It was the first Canadian book in history to sell over a million copies, and by the late 1930s had sold over seven million copies worldwide. In 1902, a sequel, Beautiful Joe's Paradise, was published. In 1934, Saunders was granted Canada's highest civilian award at the time, Commander of the Most Excellent Order of the British Empire or C.B.E. In 1963, the official Beautiful Joe Park was named in Meaford, next to the Moore house where Beautiful Joe was rehabilitated by Louise Moore. A Beautiful Joe Heritage Society was formed in 1994 to preserve Joe's legacy and ultimately establish the Moore residence as a museum.

== Connection with Black Beauty ==
Saunders did not avoid comparison of her work to the similarly themed Black Beauty. Indeed, she makes reference to Black Beauty in the very first page of Beautiful Joe, not referring to it by name but writing [from Joe's viewpoint] "I have seen my mistress laughing and crying over a little book that she says is a story of a horse's life". Joe goes on to say that he will write the story of a dog's life, to similarly please his owner. Thus, within the context of the book at least, Beautiful Joe is directly inspired by Black Beauty.

== See also ==
- List of individual dogs
