= Meaford, Ontario =

Meaford
- Municipality (lower-tier)
- Municipality of Meaford
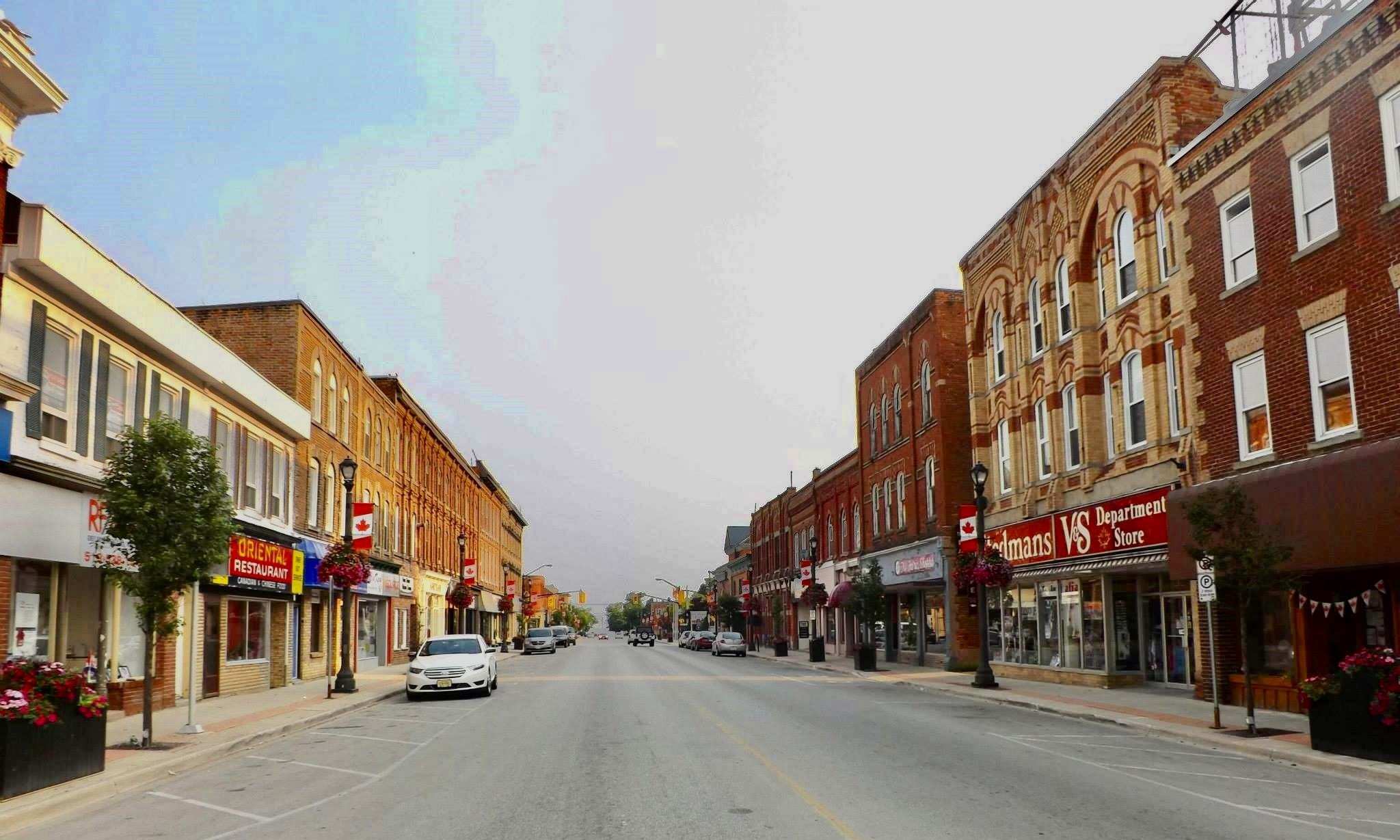
- Downtown

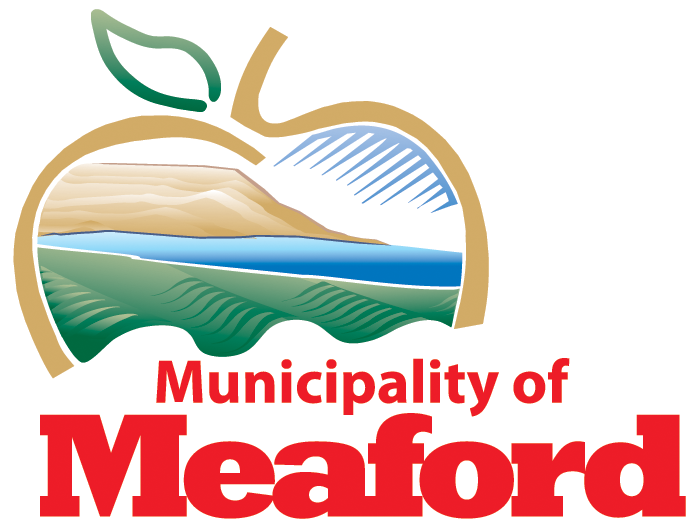
- Motto: "Set your sights on Meaford"
- Location within Grey County Location within Southern Ontario
- Coordinates: 44°35′N 80°44′W
- Country: Canada
- Province: Ontario
- County: Grey
- Settled: 1840s
- Incorporated: 1874 (town)
- Amalgamated: January 1, 2001

Government
  - Mayor: Ross Kentner
  - Fed. riding: Bruce—Grey—Owen Sound
  - Prov. riding: Bruce—Grey—Owen Sound

Area
  - Land: 587.57 km^{2} (226.86 sq mi)
  - Urban: 5.90 km^{2} (2.28 sq mi)

Population (2021)
  - Total: 11,485
  - Density: 18.7/km^{2} (48/sq mi)
  - Urban: 5,078
  - Urban density: 861/km^{2} (2,230/sq mi)
- Time zone: UTC-5 (EST)
  - Summer (DST): UTC-4 (EDT)
- Postal code FSA: N4L
- Area codes: 519, 226
- Website: www.meaford.ca

Meaford is a municipality in Grey County, Ontario, Canada, located on Nottawasaga Bay, a sub-basin of Georgian Bay and Owen Sound Bay. The municipality's seal and motto reflect its heritage as a place of apple orchards, but in the 21st century the area has partly switched to weekend homes, seasonal homes, and lakeside tourism.

The Canadian Army maintains a training facility, the 4th Canadian Division Training Centre Meaford (4 CDTC), 5 kilometres (3.1 mi) northwest of the town of Meaford.

== Communities ==
In addition to the namesake town of Meaford itself, the municipality also includes the communities of Annan, Balaclava, Bognor, Centreville, Griersville, Leith, and Woodford.

== History ==
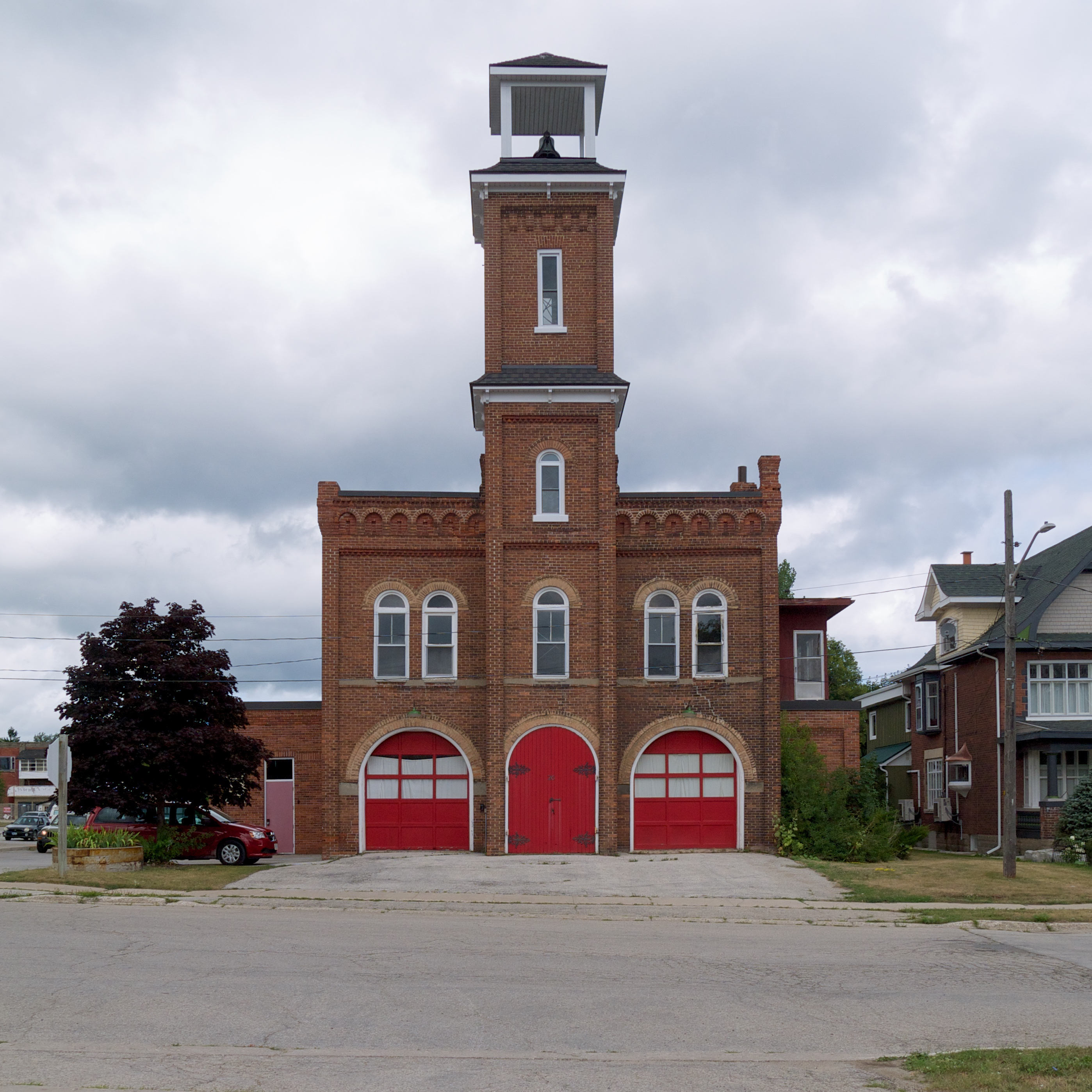
Meaford Fire Hall

In 1837, when this area was part of the St. Vincent Township, locals asked the government for a piece of land at the mouth of the Bighead River. The first settler was from Ireland, before the townsite was laid out by Charles Rankin in 1845 and called Meaford. By then, a sawmill and gristmill were already operating nearby; the post office there was called St. Vincent. Meaford saw little growth until 1850 but then began booming; it had a library by 1856.

Meaford had previously been named Peggy's Landing and Stephenson's Landing.

The post office was renamed Meaford in 1865, after the birthplace of John Jervis, 1st Earl of St Vincent, for whom the township of St. Vincent is named; by then, the community was booming and had connection by steamship and roads with the railway at Collingwood. The community became a town in 1874.

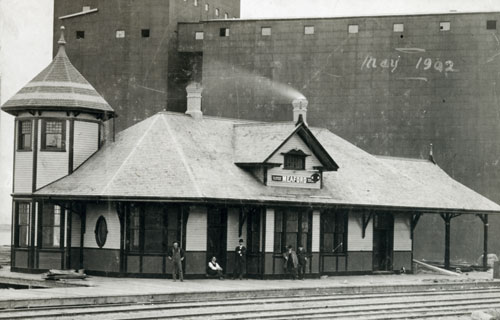
The Grand Trunk Railway station in Meaford, May 1902.

The Northern Railway of Canada's North Grey Railway arrived in Meaford on December 31, 1872 in its westward push from Collingwood via Thornbury. It was originally planned to extend further west to Owen Sound, but this ambition was never realized due to a number of factors, including rough terrain, financial limitations, and competition from the Toronto, Grey and Bruce Railway, which reached Owen Sound in 1873. The railway was later part of the Grand Trunk Railway and Canadian National Railways (CNR) systems. Thereafter, it became known as the CN Meaford Subdivision. Regular passenger service ended in 1960 and the line was abandoned in 1985.

In 1872, there were six churches. By the early 1880s, Meaford boasted three planing mills, three carriage factories, two tanneries, a sawmill, a shingle mill, a woollen mill, two foundries, two flour mills, a dozen general stores, and a wide range of other stores and tradesmen. The community also had ten hotels. A public school was added in 1868 with 152 students within a year. A high school was opened in 1890.

=== 2001 amalgamation ===
On January 1, 2001, part of a larger municipal amalgamation reorganization in Southern Ontario, St. Vincent Township, Sydenham Township and the Town of Meaford, were amalgamated to form one municipal entity. Sydenham Township was named in part for Lord Sydenham, governor of Canada from 1839 to 1841. St. Vincent Township was named after the Earl of St. Vincent and Meaford was named after his stately house. A township is an area of land (about 15 miles by 12 miles) that is usually divided into 100 acre farms. For more than one hundred years the townships of Ontario were municipal entities with an elected council and a reeve. Sometimes a small area of a township was separated and incorporated as a town. The town was then a separate and distinct municipality. This was the case with Meaford in 1874 when it was separated from St. Vincent Township. However it ceased to be a town at the time of amalgamation.

A transition team preparing for the new municipality voted in September 2000 to name it Georgian Highlands, with the name Meaford ranking second. Highland Hills, Georgian Shores, Bayview, Trillium, Big Head Valley, Georgian View, Cape Rich, Bay Shore Highlands, Georgian Bay Highlands, North Grey and Queen's Bush were other names considered.

The council of Georgian Highlands voted 4-3 on 5 February 2001 to change the name of the amalgamated municipality to Meaford, citing confusion with the neighbouring municipalities of Georgian Bluffs and Grey Highlands. A by-law to formalize the name change was subsequently passed on 5 March 2001, also by a 4-3 vote.

Since that time confusion has continued in the use of the name "Meaford". At present the name "Meaford" is commonly used in reference to the urban area formerly known as the Town of Meaford, while the name "Municipality of Meaford" is commonly used in reference to the merged region resulting from amalgamation in 2001.

== Demographics ==
In the 2021 Census of Population conducted by Statistics Canada, Meaford had a population of 11,485 living in 5,035 of its 5,828 total private dwellings, a change of 4.5% from its 2016 population of 10,991. With a land area of 587.57 km^{2} (226.86 sq mi), it had a population density of 19.5/km^{2} (50.6/sq mi) in 2021.

Canada census – Meaford community profile

	2021	2016	2011
Population	11,485 (+4.5% from 2016)	10,991 (-1.0% from 2011)	11,100 (+1.4% from 2006)
Land area	587.57 km^{2} (226.86 sq mi)	588.57 km^{2} (227.25 sq mi)	588.61 km^{2} (227.26 sq mi)
Population density	19.5/km^{2} (51/sq mi)	18.7/km^{2} (48/sq mi)	18.9/km^{2} (49/sq mi)
Median age	54.4 (M: 52.8, F: 55.6)	53.0 (M: 52.1, F: 53.9)
Private dwellings	5,828 (total) 5,035 (occupied)	5,590 (total)	5,327 (total)
Median household income	$79,500	$65,792

References: 2021 2016 2011

Historical census populations – Meaford, Ontario

Year	Pop.	±%
1996	10,497	—
2001	10,381	−1.1%
2006	10,948	+5.5%

Year	Pop.	±%
2011	11,100	+1.4%
2016	10,991	−1.0%
2021	11,485	+4.5%

Source: Statistics Canada

== Local government ==
The former mayors of Meaford were:

- 1998–2000: Doug Grant
- 2001–2003: Gerald Shortt (first Mayor since 2001 amalgamation)
- 2003–2008: Wally Reif
- 2008–2014: Francis Richardson
- 2014–2022: Barb Clumpus

Meaford is on the eastern edge of the Bruce—Grey—Owen Sound federal and provincial electoral district.

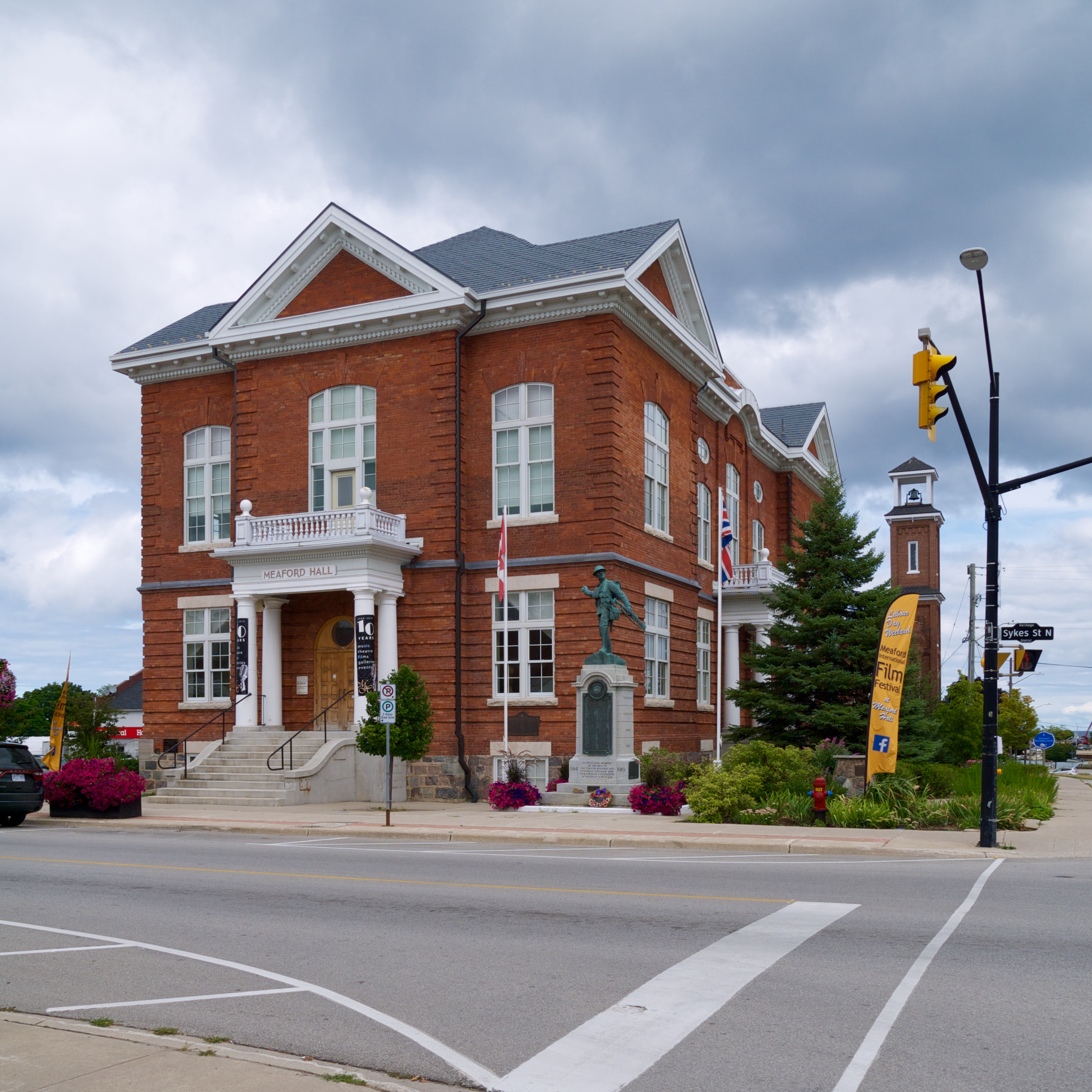
Meaford Hall

== Transportation ==
The town of Meaford is located on the coast where Bighead River runs into the bay. Ontario Highway 26 between Owen Sound and Collingwood crosses the river in the town of Meaford.

A local public transit service makes stops within urban Meaford but not in Sydenham or St Vincent. Local taxis service the area around the town of Meaford.

Major-General Richard Rohmer Meaford International Airport is located in the municipality on Highway 26 between the Town of Meaford and Owen Sound.

== Education ==
Meaford has one public school with the Bluewater District School Board:

- Georgian Bay Community School (Grades JK - 12)

The closest post-secondary school is the Georgian College regional campus in Owen Sound, Ontario.

== Trivia ==
- Several scenes from the Disney movie One Magic Christmas were filmed in Meaford.

== Media ==
The town is served by two community newspapers, the Meaford Express and the Meaford Independent, the latter originally an online only publication, however as of May 31, 2013 and the former being sold and eventually ceasing publication, is available both online and in print. CKNX-FM, originating from Wingham, Ontario to the south, has a low-power retransmitter on 104.9 FM to serve the municipality. Meaford is otherwise served principally by media from nearby Owen Sound. Rogers cable is available in the Town of Meaford while residents in the former St. Vincent and Sydenham have access only to Satellite TV.

== Municipal symbols ==
On April 15, 2016 the Canadian Heraldic Authority granted Meaford its coat of arms, flag and badge.

=== Coat of arms ===
Coat of arms of Meaford, Ontario

Granted
15 April 2016
Crest
Issuant from a circlet of staghorn sumac and trillium flowers, a rocky mount growing therefrom an eastern white pine tree proper
Escutcheon
Per chevron Azure and Argent, in chief two schooners respectant Argent, in base three apples proper
Supporters
Two percherons proper winged Azure each gorged of maple leaves Vert and standing on a bed of ostrich ferns set with two garbs of wheat proper
Motto
OUR HERITAGE • OUR FUTURE
Badge
An apple Gules charged with a schooner Argent

=== Flag ===
Per fess Argent and Azure an escutcheon of the Arms.

=== Badge ===
An apple Gules charged with a schooner Argent.

== Notable residents ==
- Lyman Duff, 8th Chief Justice of the Supreme Court of Canada
- Beautiful Joe, a dog immortalized by the 1894 book of the same name
- Claude Bissell, author and educator
- Keith Bissell: composer, conductor, and music educator (1912–1992).
- James Conmee, former Member of Provincial Parliament
- Fred S. Haines (1879–1960), artist
- Tom Harpur, author and religious columnist
- Don Knight, former Member of Provincial Parliament
- Brent Laing, curler
- Ron Lipsett, former Member of Provincial Parliament
- Marshall B. Lloyd, inventor of Lloyd Loom, Pres. Lloyd Mfg., Menominee, MI
- Herb Mitchell, former forward for the Boston Bruins
- John Muir, naturalist, author, "Father of the (U.S.) National Parks", left the US to avoid conscription during the Civil War and lived in a cabin near William Trout's mill, where he was working, in the Bighead Valley near Meaford during 1864-1866.
- Bill Murdoch, Member of Provincial Parliament
- Darren Pang, former goaltender for the Chicago Blackhawks and current NHL analyst
- Glenn Smith, former defenseman for the Toronto St. Patricks
- Tom Thomson, influential Canadian artist of the early 20th century
- Melville "Sparky" Vail, former defenseman for the New York Rangers
- Terry Wong, Canadian astronaut

== See also ==
- List of townships in Ontario
