= MacLaren Art Centre =

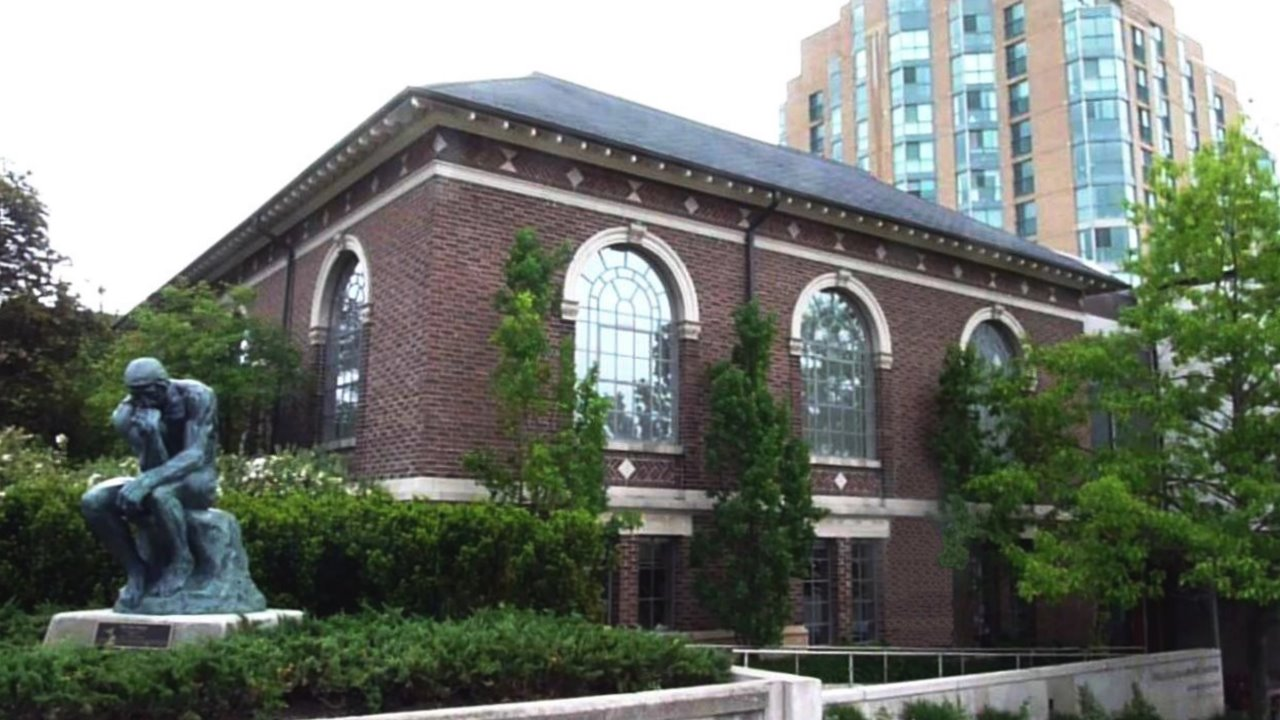
- Exterior facade of the MacLaren Art Centre
- Location: 3475 Albert Street, Barrie, Ontario, Canada
- Coordinates: 44.39010°N 79.68502°W
- Type: Art museum
- Visitors: 37 Mulcaster Street, Barrie, Ontario, Canada
- Executive director: Lisa Daniels
- Curator: Emily McKibbon (Senior Curator)
- Architect: Siamak Hariri
- Website: maclarenart.com

The MacLaren Art Centre is an art gallery and museum, located in Barrie, Ontario, Canada.

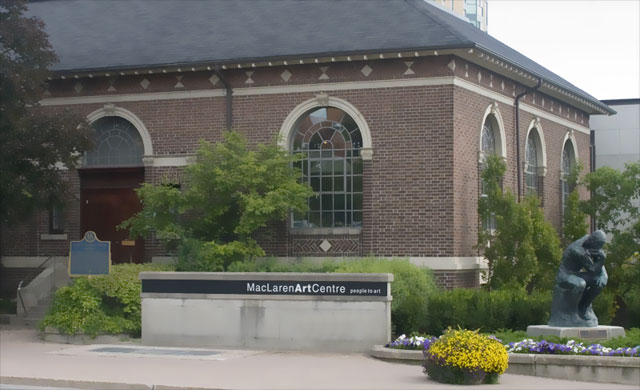

It is named in honour of Maurice MacLaren, who bequeathed his Victorian home, Maple Hill, to the Barrie Gallery Project in 1989. The MacLaren Art Centre later moved to the former City of Barrie library, a Carnegie building, and added to it; the new gallery opened in September 2001. The building was designed by Siamak Hariri of Hariri Pontarini Architects. The first piece in the gallery's collection is the Spirit Catcher, a sculpture by Ron Baird, first displayed at Expo '86 in Vancouver, and donated by the Peacock Foundation.

== See also ==
- List of art museums
- List of museums in Ontario
