= Fort Willow =

Archaeological site in Central Ontario, United States

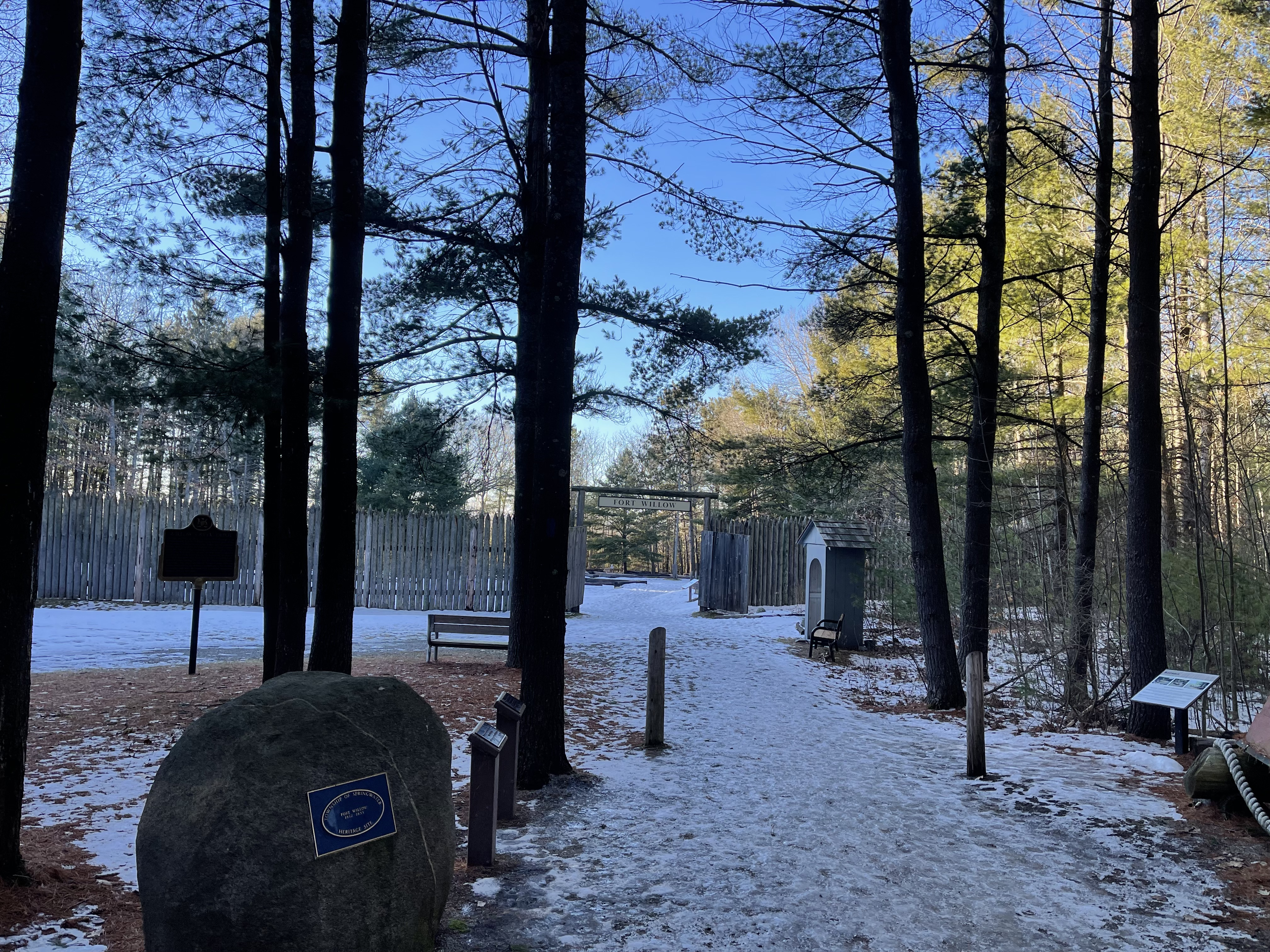
- Location: Within Fort Willow Conservation Area in Minesing, Ontario
- Coordinates: 44°23′42.82345″N 79°49′17.5941″W
- Built: c1812

Fort Willow or Willow Depot was a fortified Royal Navy and British Army supply depot in Upper Canada during the War of 1812. It is located in modern-day Springwater, Ontario. The depot was built near the strategically-important Nine Mile Portage, a pre-existing portage route used by First Nations people, as well as by the French in conducting the fur trade. The portage route allowed the British to supply their forts in the upper Great Lakes during the war which included the garrison at Michilackinac Island, near modern-day Sault Ste. Marie and the Penetanguishene Naval Yard.

The British use of the fort and portage route in the War of 1812 is recognized by the Canadian government's Historic Sites and Monuments Board as a National Historic Event.

== History ==
The Fort Willow site sits on the historic Nine Mile Portage route. This route was used by First Nations people for hundreds of years to travel between Kempenfelt Bay on Lake Simcoe and Willow Creek, a tributary of the Nottawasaga River. From the Nottawasaga River, it was then possible to reach Georgian Bay on Lake Huron. French explorers and fur traders later followed this route. The portage had come to the attention of the British armed forces by 1793.

=== Recent history ===
Restorations and archaeological investigations have located and outlined the former buildings used by the soldiers. Information kiosks provide a thorough history of the area's past use and how its location helped ensure the geographical boundaries of Canada today.

Accessibility improvements were made to the trail leading to the fort site in 2017.

== Today ==
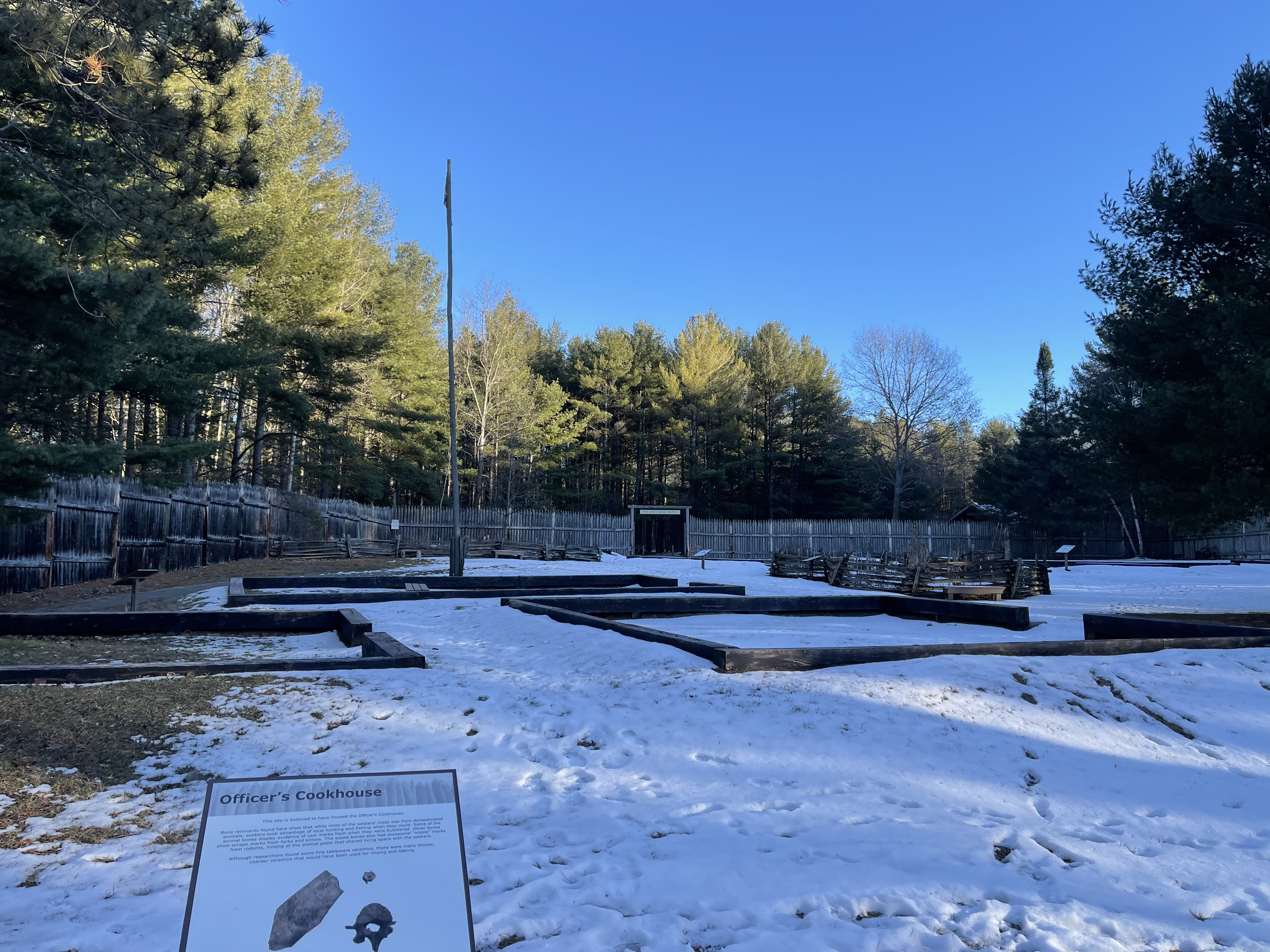
Fort Willow Grounds. The foundations of various buildings have been outlined after archaeological research

After archaeological research, the area of Fort Willow has been partially reconstructed by the Fort Willow Improvement Group. The site is in Springwater Township, approximately 10 km west of downtown Barrie, Ontario. The outline of various buildings as well as explanatory signs have been installed.
