= Stinson Theatres =

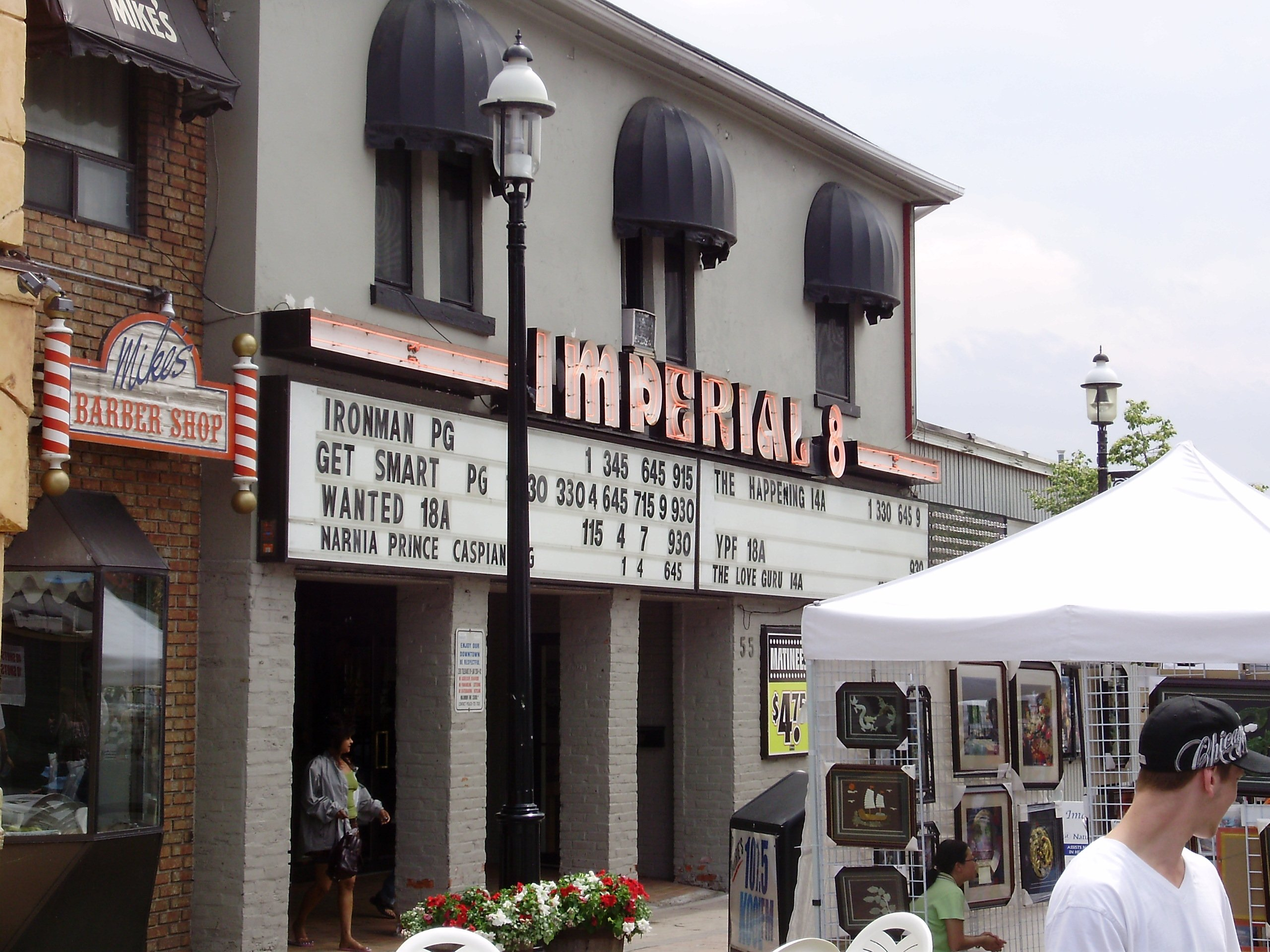
Stinson Theatres' Imperial 8 in downtown Barrie

Stinson Theatres was a movie theatre chain in Central Ontario and the Georgian Triangle in Canada.

== History ==
Founded in 1971 by Robert Stinson, Stinson Theatres grew from its original two-screen drive-in theatre in Barrie, Ontario, to 30 screens in six indoor locations and five screens at two drive-in locations. In 1996, Robert Stinson hired investment banker, Stan Medley, to take Stinson Theatres public. A new holding corporation was formed, Long Road Entertainment, Inc., and was listed on the US Pink Sheets in 2002, but Stinson Theaters was never put in the new holding company. Subsequently, plans to expand the company as a public company were abandoned and the public vehicle was sold to others and renamed in 2007. Stinson Theaters was based in Barrie and slowly wound down following founder Robert Stinson's death in 2008 by his sons Henry and Timothy Stinson.

== List of theatres ==
List of theatres of the now defunct chain:

=== Drive-in ===
- Barrie Triple Drive In – Barrie, Ontario – sold in 2011 to Premier Operating Corporation and now called Sunset Barrie.
- Owen Sound Twin Drive In – Owen Sound, Ontario – now torn down as attendance was getting worse each season.
- Huntsville Drive in – Huntsville, Ontario – sold in 1990s; now torn down.
- Collingwood Drive In – Collingwood, Ontario – sold in the mid 1990s; never operated as a theatre again but still exists.

=== Indoor cinemas ===
- Chatham Cinema Six – Chatham, Ontario – Now Sons of Kent Brewing Co. Opened July 16, 2017.
- Collingwood Cinema Four – Collingwood, Ontario – Torn down. Property is now an office building.
- Huntsville Capitol Theatre – Huntsville, Ontario – sold to Gina Giaschi Mitchell and Brian Mitchell in 2008.
- Imperial Cinema 8 – Barrie, Ontario – Changed name to Barrie Uptown Theater and operated by Barrie Imperial Theatre. The property was sold off for redevelopment and closed its doors for regular screenings on October 31, 2019. However, organizers for the Barrie Film Festival still planned to use the theatre for the "foreseeable future".. But in 2021, it was torn down to make way for condominiums.
- Orangeville Uptown Theatre – Orangeville, Ontario – Built in 1927 by the Merlina family, sold to Stinson Theatres in 1975. Closed in 2002. Now the Good Friends Fellowship Church.
- Orillia Cinema Four – Orillia, Ontario – A Galaxy Cinema opened in another location. The OC4 building now holds a church.
- Timmins Cinema 6 – Timmins, Ontario
