= Rebecca Hornbrook =

Canadian atmospheric chemist born 1975

- Born: Rebecca Suzanne Hornbrook; April 5, 1975 (age 51); Ontario, Canada
- Education: York University
- Known for: Research in volatile organic compounds.
- Awards: Governor General's Academic Medal
- Scientific career
- Fields: Atmospheric chemistry, volatile organic compounds, air quality, chemical kinetics, instrumentation.
- Doctoral advisor: Jochen Rudolph

Rebecca Suzanne Hornbrook (born 1975) is an atmospheric chemist at the National Center for Atmospheric Research (NCAR). She currently holds the position of Project Scientist II while also belonging to a variety of groups based out of NCAR, UCAR, and NASA. She is notable for her work as one of the leading experts in Volatile organic compounds (VOCs) while possessing an interest in air quality, biosphere-atmosphere interactions, chemical kinetics, and photochemistry.

== Early life and education ==
Born on April 5, 1975, Rebecca Hornbrook grew up in Barrie, Ontario. While attending Innisdale Secondary School, Hornbrook excelled at science and math which encouraged her to study science after graduation. She attended York University in Toronto where she earned her undergraduate degree in chemistry while studying to become a high school science teacher. Towards the end of her undergraduate career, Hornbrook, who spent summers working at an atmospheric chemistry lab affiliated with York University's Centre For Atmospheric Chemistry, decided to pursue her graduate degree.

After graduating with her Bachelor of Education in chemistry and mathematics as well as her Bachelor of Science in chemistry with honors in atmospheric chemistry, Hornbrook began her Doctor of Philosophy in chemistry at York University. Throughout her graduate education, she worked alongside Jochen Rudolph conducting research on Volatile organic compounds and their role in the chemistry of the troposphere. Hornbrook published a total of seven papers before graduating with her Ph.D. in chemistry from York University in 2005.

Hornbrook is the recipient of two Governor General's Academic Medals which are awarded to the student who graduates a Canadian school with the highest grades. She was awarded the Gold Medal in 2006 for her Ph.D. dissertation completed the year before at York University and the Bronze Medal in 1994 while attending Innisdale Secondary School.

== Career at NCAR and field campaigns ==
After obtaining her Ph.D, Hornbrook accepted a position at NCAR where she currently serves as a Project Scientist II. Hornbrook has been a part of various groups and has received funding from both the National Science Foundation and NASA. Hornbrook has completed research in locations worldwide as well as the United States.

=== Research in the United States ===
Hornbrook's work in the United States has focused on VOCs and air quality in specific regions. Most recently, Hornbrook was a part of the WE-CAN project which studied the effects of wildfires on air quality and the atmosphere. Wildfires have been a topic of interest to Hornbrook as one of her authored papers, Observations of nonmethane organic compounds during ARCTAS - Part 1: Biomass burning emissions and plume enhancements, focuses on the effects of wildfires on air quality at distances further away from the fires.

Hornbrook has also contributed to increasing the understanding of anthropogenic emissions in the United States by focusing on VOCs and chemical changes of the atmosphere. In 2018, Hornbrook began to work as a part of the NASA ATom project which was part of the larger goal to prepare for the potential effects of global climate change. Her authored poster, as a result of the project, details the observations made of how the upper troposphere reacts with VOCs emitted by humans. WINTER was a 2015 project based out of northern Virginia that had an emphasis on looking at emissions in the northeastern United States and their effect on pollution over the region as well as the Atlantic Ocean. In 2013, Hornbrook contributed to the NOMADSS project which focused on looking at the effects of anthropogenic emissions in Chicago, Illinois and Gary, Indiana concluding that these emissions led to an increase of mercury in the area.

A significant amount of Hornbrook's research has taken place in the Colorado Front Range. The BEACHON-ROCS study took place at the Manitou Forest Observatory in August, 2010 in order to understand reactive organic gases which can help model the atmosphere's oxidation capacity. The 2014 FRAPPE project was another Colorado based project that took a look at air quality in the Colorado Front Range and was partially funded by the state of Colorado. Hornbrook's research helped to understand how some weather patterns are more likely to retain aerosols than other weather patterns. Hornbrook gave a presentation at the Gordon Research Conference where she presented a poster about VOC observations during the FRAPPE project in the Colorado Front Range.

Prior to the FRAPPE project, Hornbrook worked on DC3 in Kansas, an airborne campaign which focused on how convective clouds interact with the upper troposphere at mid latitudes. Hornbrook's group observed that the storms observed possessed a logical relationship on a chemical level.

In 2009, Hornbrook conducted research in Barrow, Alaska as part of the OASIS-2009 campaign (Ocean-Atmosphere-Sea Ice-Snowpack). As part of a larger team, Hornbrook focused on studying VOCs as well as seasonal trends and oxidization events in the arctic. The research concluded that arctic seasonality does have an effect on the chemistry of the atmosphere. OASIS-2009 also provided a large set of data from the arctic that could be used for future analysis.

=== International research ===
Hornbrook is active in international projects that work to understand the atmosphere in a variety of locations. Hornbrook was a part of the 2016 ORCAS campaign by assisting with measuring TOGA reactive gases in the airborne study over the Southern Ocean. The study took a look at carbon dioxide and oxygen's behavior interacting with the Southern Ocean which is one of the most remote oceans on the planet. At the 2016 International Global Atmospheric Chemistry meeting, Hornbrook gave a poster presentation regarding the findings of the ORCAS project specific to VOC observations.

In the early part of 2012, Hornbrook began to work on the TORERO campaign in order to study reactive halogen gases and VOCs in the Tropical Eastern Pacific Ocean. The study was an airborne campaign which took data at various altitudes in order to learn more about atmospheric oxidization capacities at differing altitudes in tropical regions. Hornbrook's contributions to the project increased the understanding of VOCs in the studied area off of the South American Coast. Hornbrook continued to work to understand the atmosphere in tropical locations. The 2014 CONTRAST took place in Guam with the goal of learning how convection in a tropical setting can effect the movement of atmospheric gases.

=== TOGA group and instrumentation ===
2009 marked Hornbrook's first year with the Trace Organic Gas Analyzer (TOGA) team. Based out of NCAR, the TOGA team worked on creating instrumentation to improve the measurement of mixing ratios of different VOCs. In 2011, Hornbrook authored a paper detailing a new method to measure HO_{2} and RO_{2} while better separating the two differing compounds. The method proved to be effective at measuring VOCs and trace organic gases in both group based and airborne studies. The instrumentation dramatically increased the ability to detect trace organic gases by almost tripling the amount of compounds that are able to be measured.

== Other involvement ==
Hornbrook is very involved in helping women realize their potential in STEM and enter STEM fields. She has served as a mentor for the PROGRESS campaign (Promoting Geoscience Research Education and Success) which pairs women with an interest in geosciences with a mentor in a geoscience field. In 2016, Hornbrook also visited Mackintosh Academy in Boulder, Colorado to run a workshop for girls in science.

Hornbrook has also served as a mentor for the Significant Opportunities in Atmospheric Research and Science (SOARS) program. The program works to help students from underrepresented groups have an opportunity to conduct research related to atmospheric sciences.

== Publications ==
Hornbrook has been a part of many research publications. Below are a list of some of the significant publications from throughout her career.

- Global seasonal distributions of HCN and acetonitrile. 2019. 99th AMS Annual Meeting, American Meteorological Society (AMS).
- The Deep Convective Clouds and Chemistry (DC3) Field Campaign. 2015. Bulletin of the American Meteorological Society.
- High levels of molecular chlorine in the Arctic atmosphere. 2014. Nature Geoscience.
- Observations of nonmethane organic compounds during ARCTAS - Part 1: Biomass burning emissions and plume enhancements. 2011. Atmospheric Chemistry and Physics.
- Measurements of tropospheric HO₂ and RO₂ by oxygen dilution modulation and chemical ionization mass spectrometry. 2011. Atmospheric Measurement Techniques.

== Personal life ==
Hornbrook is married to another atmospheric chemist. She has two children, as well as many pets. In her free time, Hornbrook enjoys hiking, road cycling, photography, and gardening.
