= Barrie Uptown Theater =

Cinema in Barrie, Ontario, Canada

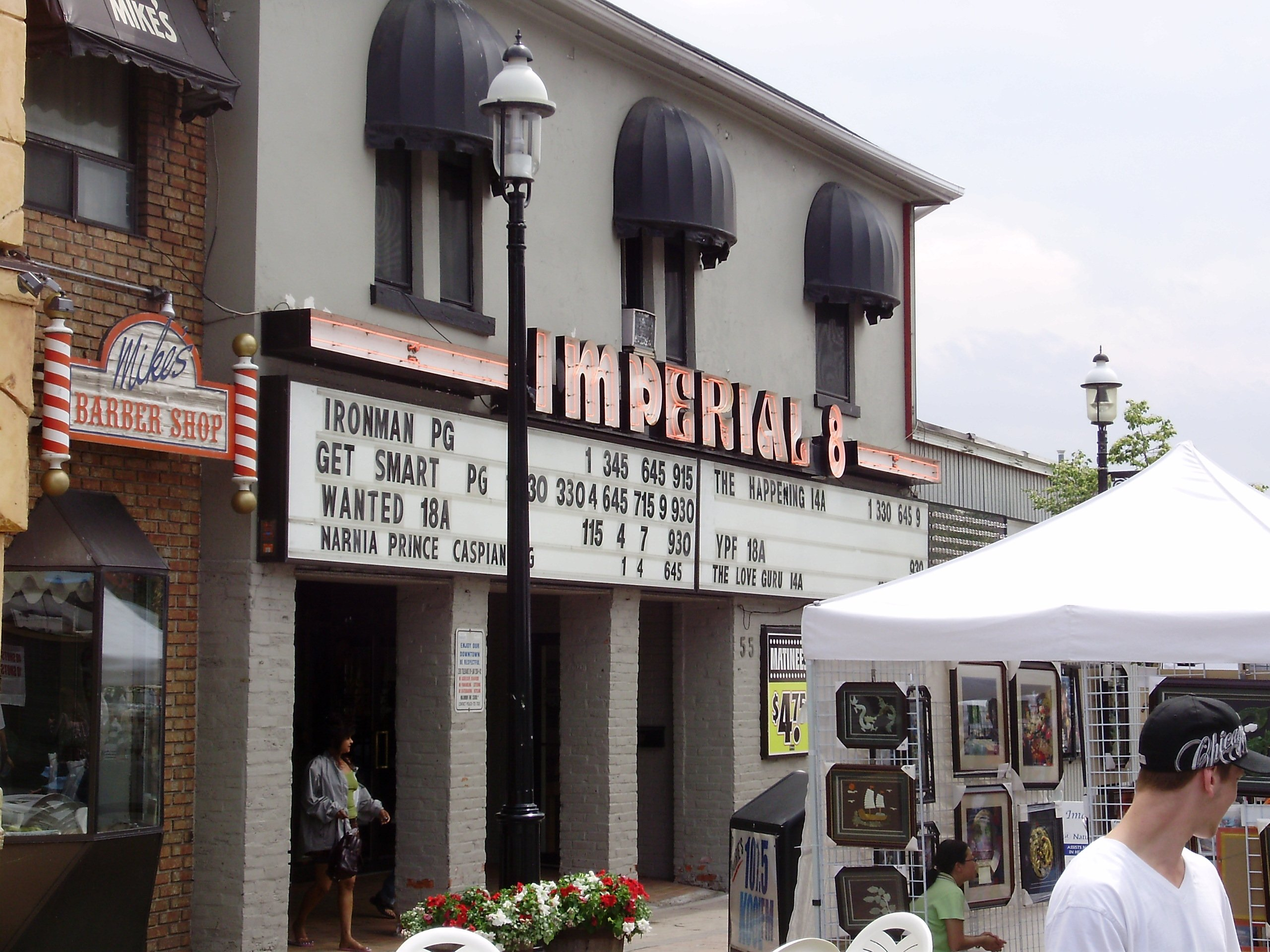
- Interactive map of Barrie Uptown Theater
- Former names: Imperial 8 Cinema
- Address: 55 Dunlop Street West; Barrie, Ontario; L4N 1A3
- Coordinates: 44.388434°N 79.691774°W
- Public transit: 5A, 5B, 8B

Construction
- Opened: 1937

Website
- barrieuptowntheater.ca

Barrie Uptown Theater (formerly Imperial 8 Cinema) was a movie theatre in downtown Barrie, Ontario, Canada. The cinema was built in 1937, and is home to the Barrie Film Festival. The building had 8 screens, though movies were only shown on 5 since its reopening. In the 60's it was 1 gigantic room and screen, with burgundy crush velvet pull up seats, with aisle lights and a uniformed usher with flashlight, also had a large full length upper balcony. The cinema was part of the now defunct Stinson Theatres chain. In February 2009, the Imperial 8 closed completely for several months, citing structural problems, lack of parking, and declining ticket sales. It was later purchased by local businessman Mark Porter and reopened on November 27, 2009 under the rebranded 'Barrie Uptown Theatre', including a licensed bar and reclining seats. In December 2014, Porter announced his intention to sell the building to developers.

The property was later sold for redevelopment and closed its doors for regular screenings on October 31, 2019. However, organizers for the Barrie Film Festival still planned to use the theatre for the "foreseeable future".

The theatre closed in 2021.
