= Nine Mile Portage =

Portage in Ontario, Canada

Coordinates: 44.382°N 79.787°W

The Nine Mile Portage was a portage which connected Kempenfelt Bay of Lake Simcoe, Ontario, to Willow Creek, a tributary of the Nottawasaga River that flows to Wasaga Beach on Georgian Bay. The Barrie Chamber of Commerce in the nineteen fifties restored what was still traceable of the Nine Mile Portage. The city of Barrie plans to make it possible to walk the original route of the trail, but at present no public right-of-way exists. Very small portions of the original portage are incorporated into the Nine MIle Portage Heritage Trail which is a multi-use recreational trail running between Meridian Place in downtown Barrie and Fort Willow in Springwater Township. Most of the original portage route is on private property and not accessible to the public.

== History ==
In the early centuries of the colonial period, the Nine Mile Portage was a minor fur trade route. It was used by Étienne Brûlé and Alexander Henry, among others.

John Franklin 'fix[ed] the longitude and latitude of the “Nottawassaga Portage” at 44º22’55"N and 79º53’41"W' during his second overland expedition to the Arctic Ocean.

Following the War of 1812, the portage was used by the Royal Navy and British Army until as late as the 1850s to transport supplies to the Penetanguishene Naval Yard.

== See also ==
- Lake Simcoe
- Igopogo
- Wasaga Beach
