= Central Ontario Broadcasting =

Canadian media company

Central Ontario Broadcasting is the operating name of Rock 95 Broadcasting Ltd., a Canadian media company, which operates two radio stations in Barrie, Ontario, CFJB-FM and CKMB-FM. The company was founded in 1988.

Central Ontario Broadcasting also established CIND-FM in Toronto, and operated it from its 2013 launch until its sale to Local Radio Lab in 2024 as announced in October 2023.

According to CRTC ownership records, the company is jointly owned, through holding companies, by Douglas Bingley (56.9%) and Robert Chapple (43.1%).
