= Coat of arms of Barrie =

- Armiger: The Corporation of the City of Barrie
- Adopted: 1977, registered with Canadian Heraldic Authority 2005
- Crest: Issuant from a mural crown Gules, a mount Vert thereon a mercat cross Or
- Torse: Azure and Argent
- Helmet: A Gentleman's helm mantled Azure doubled Argent
- Shield: Argent three bars gemel wavy Azure, on a chief Gules a naval crown between a winged wheel and a cog wheel Or
- Supporters: Dexter a private soldier in the uniform of the Canadian Army of the First World War standing easy with a rifle supported by the dexter hand, sinister the goddess Ceres proper vested argent wreathed about the temples with a garland of corn ears Or holding in the sinister hand a basket of fruit proper at the feet a garb Or
- Motto: THE PEOPLE ARE THE CITY
- Other elements: The badge: on a pentagram Or a mural crown Argent charged with a bar gemel wavy Azure

The coat of arms of Barrie was granted by the College of Arms on 1 March 1977. The grant included the full coat of arms as well as a flag and a badge, both derived from the arms. The city registered the arms with the Canadian Heraldic Authority on 20 January 2005.

== See also ==
- Canadian heraldry
- National symbols of Canada
- List of Canadian provincial and territorial symbols
- Heraldry
