= CFJB-FM =

Radio station in Barrie, Ontario, Canada

Coordinates: 44°21′05″N 79°41′54″W

- Barrie, Ontario; Canada
- Broadcast area: Central Ontario
- Frequency: 95.7 MHz
- Branding: Rock 95

Programming
- Format: Active rock

Ownership
- Owner: Central Ontario Broadcasting; (Rock 95 Broadcasting (Barrie-Orillia) Ltd.)
- Sister stations: CKMB-FM

History
- First air date: October 7, 1988

Technical information
- Class: C
- ERP: 41,000 watts average 100,000 watts peak
- HAAT: 303.5 metres (996 ft)

Links
- Webcast: Listen Live
- Website: rock95.com

CFJB-FM is a Canadian radio station, broadcasting at 95.7 FM in Barrie, Ontario. The station broadcasts an active rock format branded as "Rock 95".

Owned by Central Ontario Broadcasting (Rock 95 Broadcasting (Barrie-Orillia) Ltd.), the station launched on October 7, 1988.

CFJB can be heard as far south as Mississauga, and as far north as Sundridge. It cannot be heard in the southeast due to adjacent station CJKX-FM broadcasting on 95.9 FM in Oshawa.

The call letters once belonged to a Brampton radio station, in the 1950s.

On May 7, 2012, CFJB's owners (Central Ontario Broadcasting) were granted permission to launch a sister station in Toronto on 88.1 MHz, CIND-FM.
