= Kempenfest =

Arts and crafts festival in Canada

Coordinates: 44.38571°N 79.61449°W

- Status: Active
- Genre: Arts festival
- Frequency: Annual
- Venue: Kempenfelt Bay
- Locations: Barrie, Ontario
- Years active: 44
- Inaugurated: 3 August 1971
- Attendance: 146,000 (2024)
- Website: kempenfest.com

Kempenfest is an outdoor arts and crafts festival in Barrie, Ontario, Canada. The festival occurs annually over the August long weekend and features over 300 artisans, an antique show, food demonstrations, children's activities and live entertainment. It is named after Kempenfelt Bay and began in 1971.

It was originally placed at Formosa Spring Breweries Park (later known as Molson Park) Ontario, and moved to downtown Barrie in 1975.

The festival includes a 2000-metre swim across Kempenfelt Bay, leaving from Centennial Beach. Since 2014, the city has offered free shuttle service around the bay.

Kempenfest is organized by a committee representing eight different organizations who each play a role in executing the event. The Barrie Art Club and the Barrie Kiwanis Club form the Huronia Festival of Arts and Crafts, who jury the 350+ art and craft exhibitors into the event. The Optimist Club coordinates the Antiques section of the event. The Chamber of Commerce hosts a beer garden and entertainment stage in Centennial Park. The Barrie Rotary Club hosts the main beer gardens and main stage. The YMCA hosts the Children's Village with kids activities throughout the weekend. The Lions Club, Kiwanis Club, Knights of Columbus and Optimist Club also run food and beverage outlets at the event.

These groups typically raise over $250,000 annually for their community work through their involvement in Kempenfest.

== Entertainment ==
Kempenfest runs two stages at the event. The Main Stage at the Rotary Beer Garden features both daytime and evening paid shows. Past entertainers include The Stampeders, Lighthouse, April Wine, Johnny Reid, Jason Blaine, George Canyon, Sloan, The Carpet Frogs, and the Martels.
