= Sandy Hollow landfill =

Landfill in Ontario, Canada

Coordinates: 44.3848°N 79.7414°W

The Sandy Hollow landfill, or Barrie landfill, is a landfill located near Barrie, Ontario in Canada.

The landfill started receiving waste in the early 1960s and it has three cells (each with three sections). There is a leachate collection system, a system of pipes that catch drippings and water from the garbage and relays it to the city’s sanitary sewer system and Water Pollution Control Centre for treatment. The containment system also serves older areas of the landfill, which totals 18 hectares of the 121-hectare property.

In 2008, Barrie started a $4.46-million project to help create more space in the landfill and extend Sandy Hollow's lifespan until 2024. The work involves removing more than 750,000 square feet (70,000 m^{2}) of sand. The Barrie Landfill project encompassed one of the first dual layered synthetic liner landfill cells in Ontario, complete with a collection system for liquid flowing from the landfill called leachate, coupled with a purge well hydraulic barrier. The new cell will protect groundwater while giving the City up to a decade of new capacity at current infilling rates.
