= Spirit Catcher =

Sculpture in Barrie, Ontario

Sculpture Bird
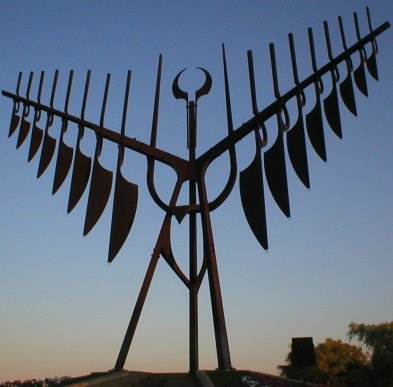
- The Sculpture Bird near Kempenfelt Bay, Barrie
- Artist: Ron Baird
- Year: 1986
- Medium: COR-TEN
- Dimensions: 21 m × 25 m (830 in × 980 in)
- Location: Barrie, Ontario, Canada; 44.38651781770254°N 79.6892987197223°W

The Sculpture Bird (also called Dream Catcher, Spirit Catcher) is a sculpture situated on the shore of Kempenfelt Bay in Barrie, Ontario, Canada. It was originally created by sculptor Ron Baird for Expo 86 in Vancouver, British Columbia.

Nine sculptors were asked to submit proposals for Expo 86, and two were chosen to be commissioned. The sculpture took six months to sculpt using COR-TEN steel; this alloy develops a non-corrosive oxide and retains its structural integrity.

After the end of the exposition the sculpture was purchased by the Helen McCrea Peacock Foundation in Toronto for CA$230,000. The foundation then donated the sculpture to the 'Barrie Gallery Project' as an inspiration to create an art gallery in the city of Barrie. The twenty ton, 25 m (70 ft) wide by 21 m (65 ft) tall sculpture was transported to Barrie using two flatbed trucks, and was installed by volunteers and two cranes. It took two days during the weekend of 12 June and 13 June 1987, and was dedicated on 12 September 1987.

The sculpture has 16 kinetic quills, which rock back and forth when the wind blows. Several months after it was erected on the site in Barrie, the unpredictable winds coming onshore from Kempenfelt Bay caused concern that the quills might fall off. The quills were redesigned by the artist with the assistance of Mike Davies, the recently retired vice president of advanced engineering at de Havilland aircraft.

The sculpture is a focal point on the Barrie waterfront, and serves as both a meeting place and navigational aid to travellers and citizens of the city alike. The installation of the sculpture initiated a drive to place numerous pieces of art around the city which continues to this day.

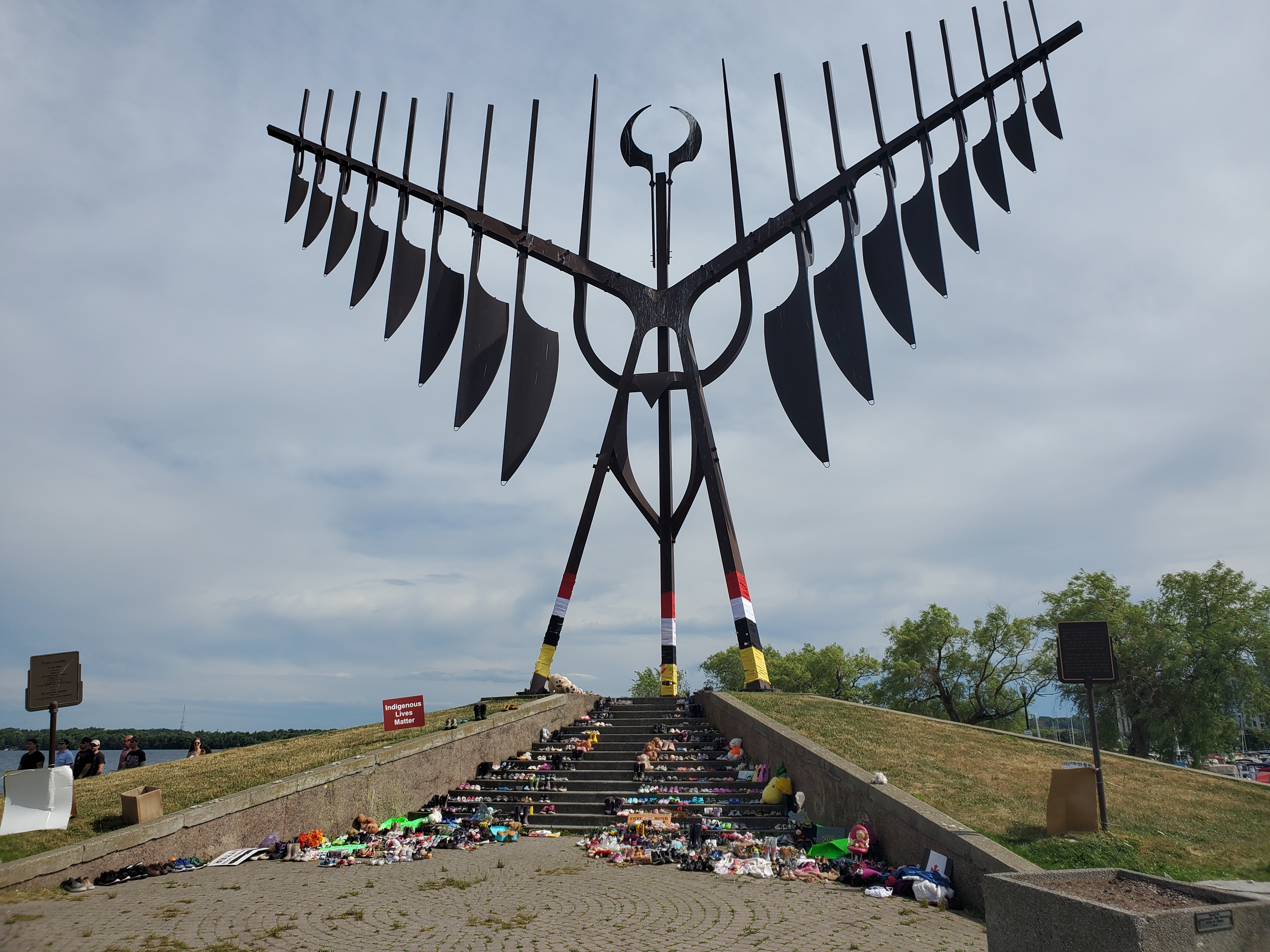
The Sculpture Bird adorned with children's shoes in June 2021.

In May 2021, residents placed children's footwear at the base of the Sculpture Bird to commemorate the 215 children found in an unmarked grave at the Kamloops Indian Residential School.

In September 2022, the sculpture was added as a unique point of interest in Microsoft Flight Simulator. Players can view the sculpture from the air or from Kempenfelt Bay when landed with a seaplane.
