= CKMB-FM =

Radio station in Barrie, Ontario

Coordinates: 44.35087°N 79.66368°W

- Barrie, Ontario; Canada
- Broadcast area: Central Ontario
- Frequency: 107.5 MHz
- Branding: 107.5 Kool FM

Programming
- Format: Hot adult contemporary

Ownership
- Owner: Central Ontario Broadcasting; (Rock 95 Broadcasting (Barrie-Orillia) Ltd.)
- Sister stations: CFJB-FM

History
- First air date: 2001
- Call sign meaning: Michael, Megan, and Matthew Bingley, children of the owner

Technical information
- Class: C1
- ERP: 20,000 watts (average); 50,000 watts (peak)
- HAAT: 303.5 metres (996 ft)

Links
- Website: 1075koolfm.com

CKMB-FM is a Canadian radio station, broadcasting at 107.5 FM in Barrie, Ontario. The station airs music in the hot adult contemporary format. The station was launched in 2001 by Central Ontario Broadcasting (Rock 95 Broadcasting (Barrie-Orillia) Ltd.), the owners of CFJB. It was launched as Star 107.5.

CKMB's call letters were taken from station owner Doug Bingley's desire to name the station after his children, Michael, Matthew and Megan Bingley. He had originally wanted to use the call letters for CFJB when that station was launched in 1988, although the call sign was not available at that time.

On August 20, 2004, the CRTC approved Rock 95's application to change CKMB's frequency to 107.7 MHz and to change the authorized contours by relocating the transmitter. The change to 107.7 MHz was never implemented. Instead of the frequency change, on July 20, 2005, the CRTC approved Rock 95's application to increase CKMB-FM's power from 17,000 watts to 20,000 watts, by increasing the antenna height to 303.5 metres and by relocating the transmitter. CKMB-FM would remain at 107.5 MHz.

In December 2005, CKMB rebranded from Star 107.5 to 107.5 Kool FM and began more current/recurrent airplay over classic airplay.
