= Barrie Film Festival =

Annual film festival in Barrie, Ontario

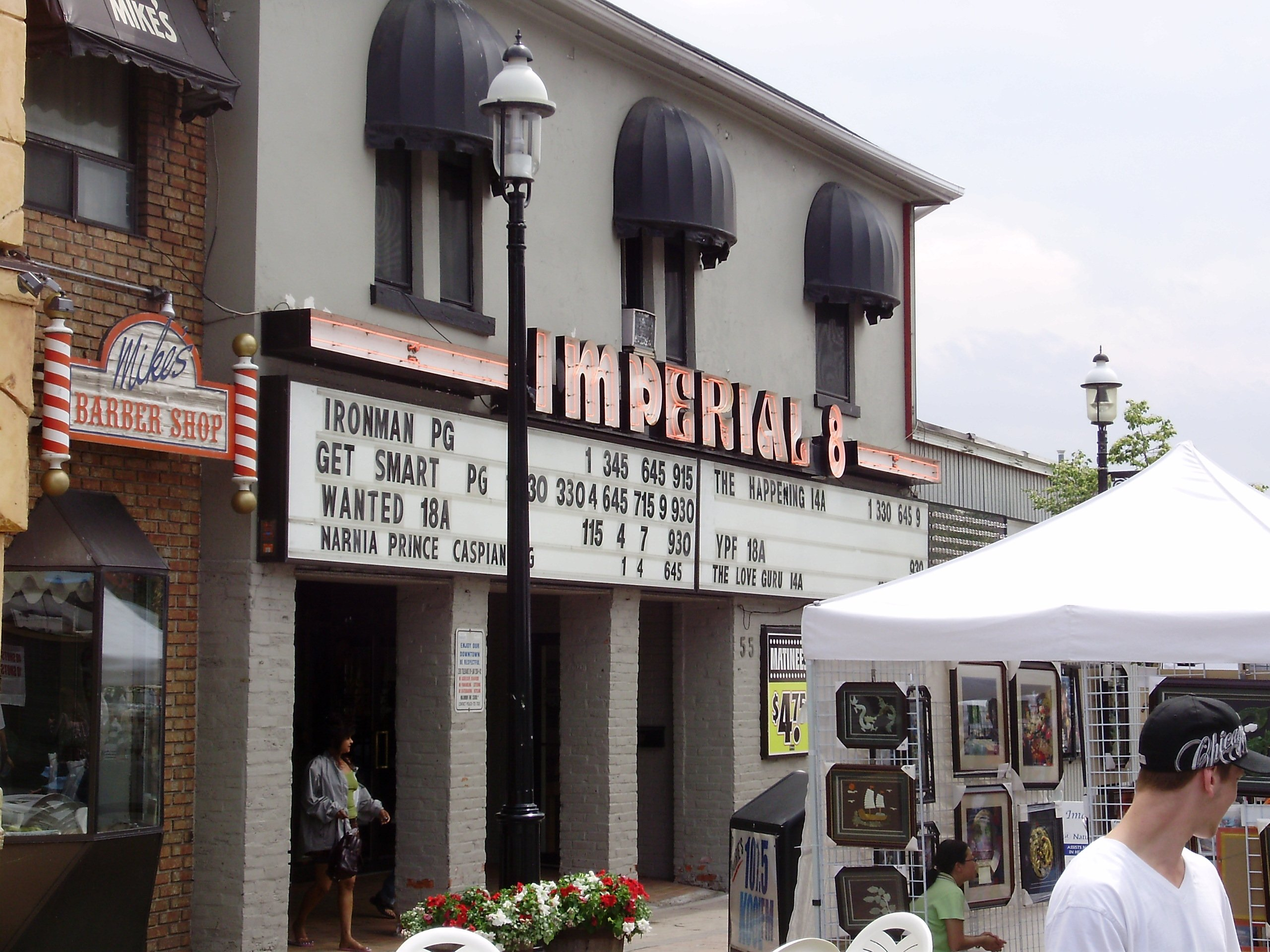
- Host theater, The Uptown in 2008
- Location: Barrie, Ontario, Canada
- Language: International
- Website: barriefilmfestival.ca

The Barrie Film Festival is an annual film festival in Barrie, Ontario, Canada. Since it began in 1997, the festival has expanded to include galas, a short-film competition, a director's brunch, educational workshops and guest Q&As.

The festival briefly moved to the Bayfield cinema in 2009 when its prior venue, the Imperial Theatre, closed and changed hands. It later returned to the original venue when it was reopened as the Uptown; after the Uptown permanently closed in 2021, the 2022 festival was staged at various venues including the city's main commercial Galaxy Cinema, and the auditorium at Georgian College.

The organization also stages Barrie's annual Reel Stories documentary film festival in the spring, and the Central Ontario Youth Short Film Festival to showcase work by local emerging filmmakers in the summer, as well as a monthly Screen One screening series of repertory films throughout the year, and a summer Lawnchair Luminata screening series of family films at the downtown Meridian Place.

== See also ==
- List of festivals in Canada
