= Ron Baird =

Canadian artist

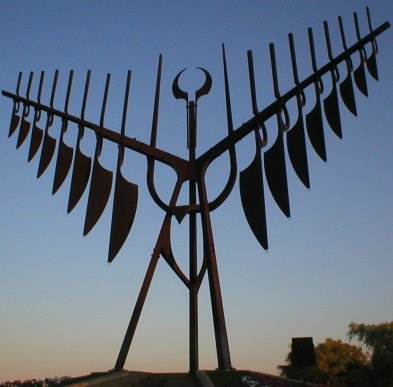
- Spirit Catcher by Ron Baird
- Born: Ronald Arnott Baird; 1940 (age 85–86); Toronto, Ontario
- Education: Ontario College of Art
- Occupation: Artist
- Known for: large-scale stainless steel sculptor, printmaker
- Awards: Allied Arts Award from the Royal Architectural Institute of Canada; Named to the Royal Canadian Academy of Arts (1978)

Ronald Arnott Baird RCA is a Canadian artist. He is best known for his stainless-steel sculptures. He became a member of the Royal Canadian Academy of Arts in 1978 and the 1971 recipient of the Allied Arts Award from the Royal Architectural Institute of Canada.

== Career ==
Ron Baird was born in 1940 in Toronto, Ontario. As an artist, he trained at the Ontario College of Art. He first became known for his architectural sculptures. Baird largely uses the medium of stainless steel. Over his career, Ron Baird has received more than 300 commissions for public installations. Many of these pieces are found on boardwalks, harbours, and hospitals.

In 1971 Baird erected the tallest steel sculpture in North America (at 33.5 metres) at the Atmospheric Environment Services site (Environment Canada main headquarters) at 4905 Dufferin Street in Toronto. That year he received the Allied Arts Award from the Royal Architectural Institute of Canada. In 1978 he was named to the Royal Canadian Academy of Arts.

Baird's work Spirit Catcher was created for the 1986 Expo in Vancouver and placed along False Creek between the then Great Ramses II exhibit and McBarge in what is now George Wainborn Park (based on photo with view of Granville Street Bridge and Burrard Bridge in the background). The sculpture consists of 20-tonnes of Corten-steel, and conveys the theme of reconciliation with Indigenous people. It currently sits on the waterfront in Barrie, Ontario. In 2018, he began a statue for the waterfront of Beaverton, Ontario, entitled Sky Woman. The location of Sky Woman is pending on fate of Beaverton Harbour redevelopment. Spirit Catcher also has a sister sculpture named Sea Serpent on the Barrie waterfront at Heritage Park. The second sculpture was in a private collection in the Horseshoe Valley area and later Kingston, Ontario. In 2018, Baird was selected for the La Biennale di Venezia, and his work was exhibited that year in the Palazzo Bembo on Venice's Grand Canal.

Baird is now a resident of Beaverton, Ontario.
