= Innisdale Secondary School =

Coordinates: 44°21′33.93″N 79°41′7.26″W

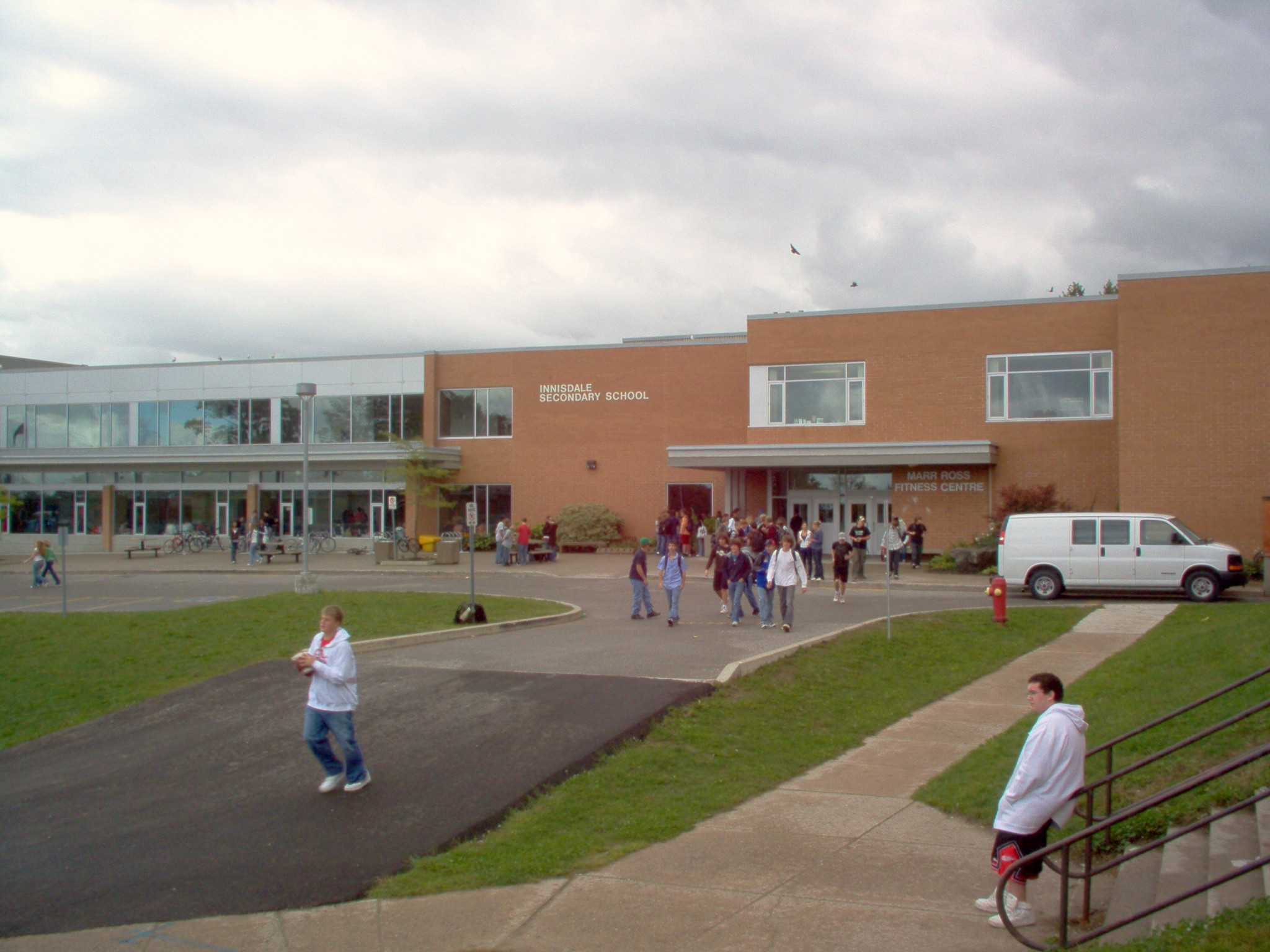

Location
- 95 Little Avenue; Barrie, Ontario, L4N 2Z4; Canada

Information
- School type: Public, High school
- Founded: 1978
- School board: Simcoe County District School Board
- Superintendent: Jennifer Newby
- School number: 918253
- Principal: Julie Rennison
- Grades: 9-12
- Enrollment: 1680 (2020–21)
- Language: English
- Colours: Orange and Royal Blue
- Mascot: Izzy (Invader)
- Team name: Innisdale Invaders
- Website: iss.scdsb.on.ca

Innisdale Secondary School is a public secondary school that is located in the south end of Barrie, Ontario, Canada. It was the largest high school in Simcoe County before the opening of Maple Ridge Secondary School in 2021. It was founded in 1978. The principal is Julie Rennison.

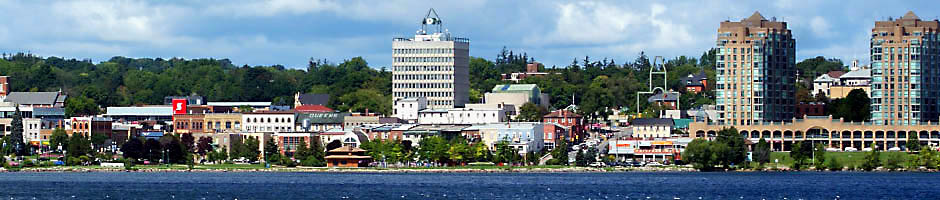
Downtown Waterfront in Barrie Ontario

== History ==
Innisdale's school crest.

Innisdale was founded in 1978. Between 1878 and 1945, the land was home to a farmstead. The maple trees that line the street that is attached to the school's parking lot were planted by the original owners of the farm and have not changed (except for some removals due to safety concerns) since the school was built. In honor of the original owners of the farm, the Kennedy family, the street beside which the trees run was named Kennedy Way in 2005.

== Sports and activities ==
Sports offered include: badminton, baseball, basketball, cross country running, curling, flag football, football, golf, hockey, mountain biking, rugby, skiing (alpine and Nordic), soccer, swimming, tennis, track and field, Capoeira dance arts, ultimate frisbee, and volleyball. Academic-related extracurriculars offered include: debate club, DECA, mechatronics club, and chess club. Artistic extracurriculars offered include: dance team, yearbook, stage band, improv club and culinary club

Innisdale also has a co-operative education program for athletes training with the Mariposa School of Skating.

== Feeder schools ==
Innisdale receives students from a large catchment area of south Barrie (Allandale), downtown Barrie and a portion of northern Innisfil. Feeder schools include:

- Hillcrest PS

Warnica PS Willow Landing ES Assikinack PS Ardagh Bluffs PS

== Notable Alumni ==
- Jadyn Keeler, Canadian Long Distance Runner

== See also ==
- Education in Ontario
- List of secondary schools in Ontario
