= Barrie =

City in Ontario, Canada

- City (single-tier)
- City of Barrie
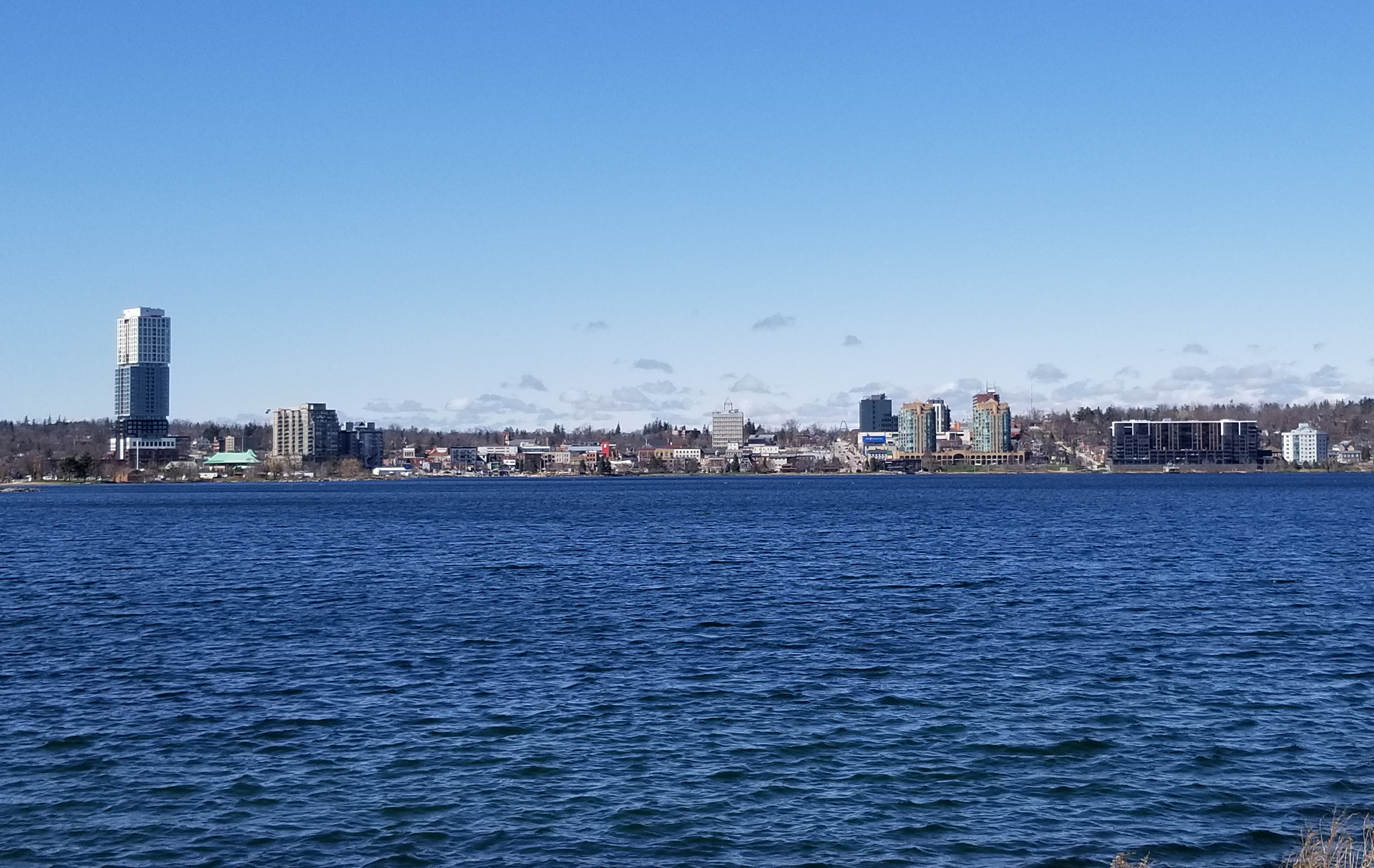
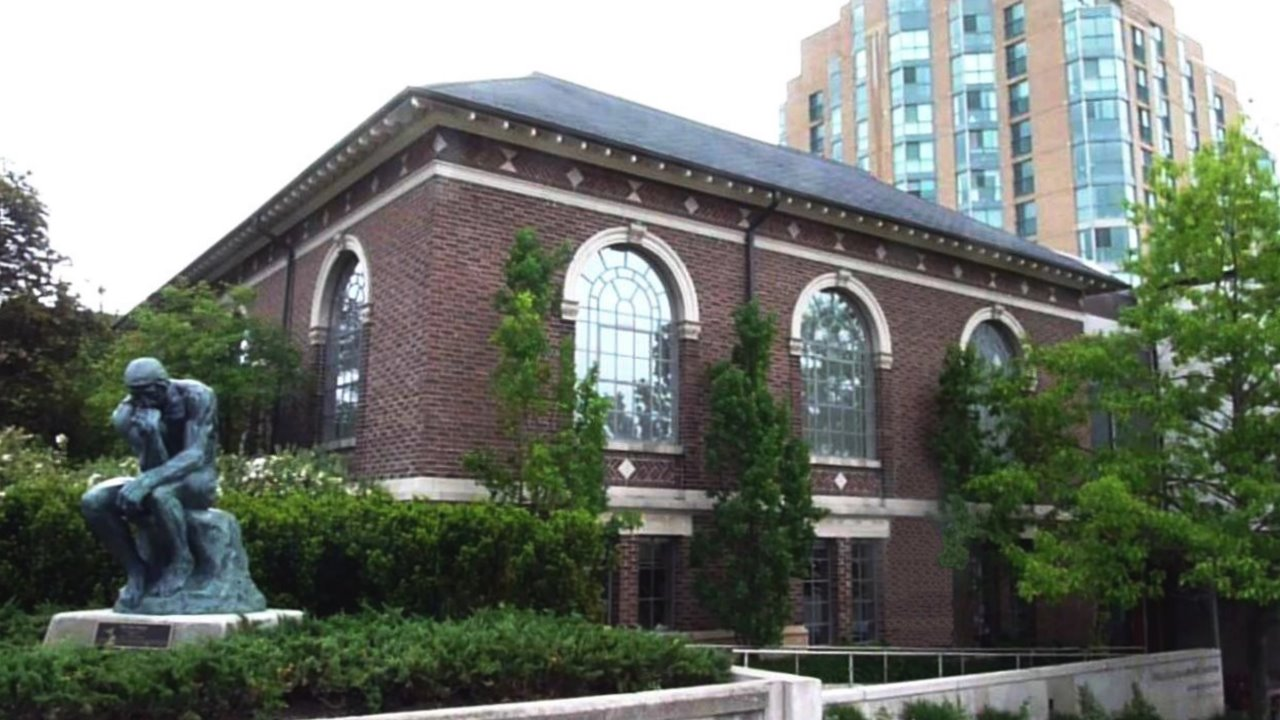
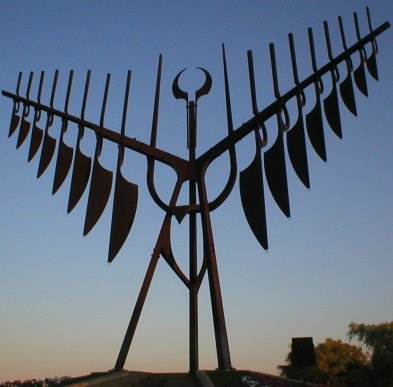
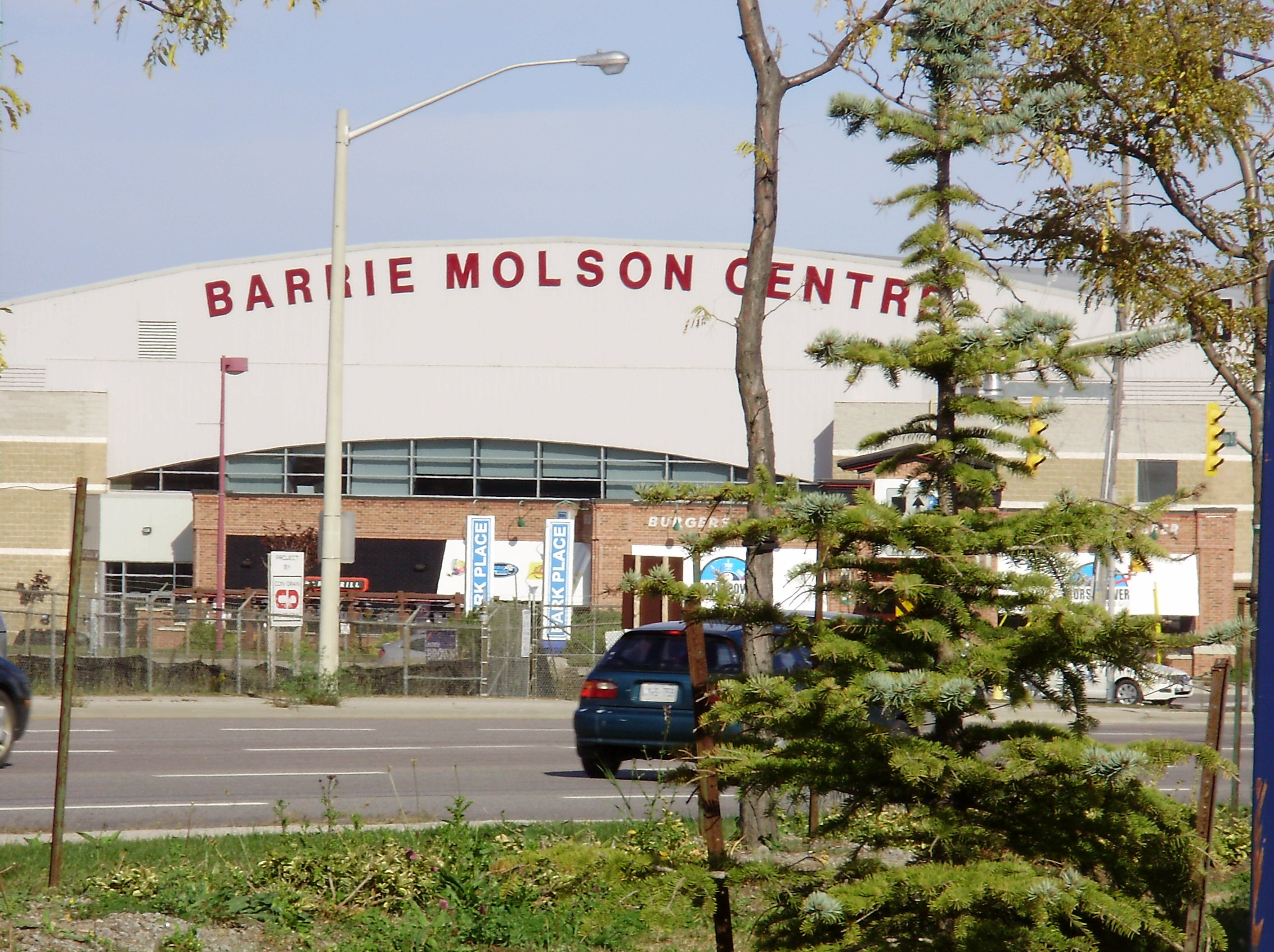
- Downtown Barrie seen from across Kempenfelt Bay MacLaren Art Centre the Spirit Catcher Sadlon Arena

- Flag Coat of arms Logo
- Motto: The People are the City
- Location within Southern Ontario Location within Simcoe County
- Coordinates: 44°22′16″N 79°40′37″W
- Country: Canada
- Province: Ontario
- First settled: 1828
- Established: 1854 (village); 1870 (town); 1959 (city)
- Named for: Sir Robert Barrie

Government
  - Mayor: Alex Nuttall
  - Governing body: Barrie City Council
  - MPs, and MPPs: John Brassard (C); Doug Shipley (C); Doug Downey (PC); Andrea Khanjin (PC)

Area
  - City (single-tier): 99.01 km^{2} (38.23 sq mi)
  - Urban: 95.33 km^{2} (36.81 sq mi)
  - Metro: 897.26 km^{2} (346.43 sq mi)
- Elevation: 252 m (827 ft)

Population (2021)
  - City (single-tier): 147,829
  - Density: 1,493.1/km^{2} (3,867/sq mi)
  - Urban: 154,676
  - Urban density: 1,622.5/km^{2} (4,202/sq mi)
  - Metro: 212,856
  - Metro density: 237.2/km^{2} (614/sq mi)
- Time zone: UTC−5 (EST)
  - Summer (DST): UTC−4 (EDT)
- Forward Sortation Area: L4M to L4N, L9J, L9X
- Area codes: 705, 249, and 683
- Highways: Highway 400; Highway 26; Highway 27; Highway 90; Highway 11
- GNBC Code: FAFFD
- GDP (Barrie CMA): CA$9.5 billion (2021)
- Website: barrie.ca

Barrie is a city in Central Ontario, Canada, about 90 kilometres (56 mi) north of Toronto. The city is located along the shores of Kempenfelt Bay and geographically within Simcoe County, although it is a single-tier municipality that is politically independent from the surrounding county.

The city is part of the extended urban area in Southern Ontario known as the Greater Golden Horseshoe. As of the 2021 census, the city's population was 147,829, while the census metropolitan area had a population of 212,856 residents. The area was first settled during the War of 1812 as a supply depot for British forces, and Barrie was named after Sir Robert Barrie. The city has grown significantly in recent decades due to the emergence of the technology industry.

It is connected to the Greater Golden Horseshoe by Highway 400 and GO Transit's Barrie line. Significant sectors of the city's diversified economy include education, healthcare, information technology, and manufacturing. Communities to its south, particularly Innisfil, New Tecumseth, and Newmarket have developed rapidly since the turn of the 21st century. The city is notable for being one of the centres of the 1985 United States–Canada tornado outbreak.

== History ==
=== Before 1900 ===
At its inception, Barrie was an establishment of houses and warehouses at the foot of the Nine Mile Portage from Kempenfelt Bay to Fort Willow, an indigenous transportation route that existed centuries before Europeans arrived in Simcoe County. The portage linked Kempenfelt Bay through Willow Creek, connecting Lake Simcoe to the Nottawasaga River which flows into Georgian Bay off Lake Huron.

Barrie played an integral role in the War of 1812. During the war, the city became a supply depot for British forces and, in addition, the Nine Mile Portage was adopted by the British military as a key piece of their supply line which provided a strategic path for communication, personnel and vital supplies and equipment to and from Fort Willow and Georgian Bay/Lake Huron. Today, the Nine Mile Portage is marked by signs along roads in Barrie and in Springwater Township. The scenic path from Memorial Square to Fort Willow is accessible to visitors year-round.

In 1815, Treaty 16 was signed, which transferred 250,000 acres of land from the Chippewa people to the colonial government. In 1818, Treaty 18 was signed, which resulted in the surrender of an additional 1,592,000 acres of land. The British supply depot would continue to prove useful for portaging Europeans and settlers making their way to northern and western Upper Canada.

The city was named in 1833 after Sir Robert Barrie, who was in charge of the naval forces in Canada and frequently commanded forces through the city and along the Nine Mile Portage. Barrie was also the final destination for a branch of the Underground Railroad. In the mid-19th century, this network of secret routes allowed many American slaves to enter Barrie and the surrounding area. This contributed to the development (and name) of nearby Shanty Bay. In 1846, the population of Barrie was roughly 500, mostly from England, Ireland and Scotland. A private school, three churches, a brick courthouse and a limestone jail, (built in 1842), were in operation. Local businesses included three taverns, six stores, three tanneries, a wagon maker, a bakery, a cabinet maker and six shoemakers, as well as a bank.

By 1869, Barrie became the county seat of Simcoe County, flourishing with a population of over 3,000 people. With this population increase came the establishment of prominent businesses and landmarks. In 1850, Edward Marks had established the Barrie Hotel (now called the Queen's Hotel), the oldest continuously running hotel in Barrie, James and Joseph Anderton established the Anderton Brewery in 1869, which would go on to be one of Barrie's largest employers for years, and Edmund Lally opened one of the Canadian Bank of Commerce's original branches in Barrie in 1867. A line of the Northern Railway was opened in 1853, connecting Barrie with Toronto and several other municipalities in Simcoe County and Muskoka. The Hamilton and North-Western Railway (H&NW) also ran through Barrie, and the two railways would eventually reorganize into the Northern and North Western Railway in June 1879. Allandale Station was the primary train station serving Barrie at the time. The Grand Trunk Railway purchased the original Northern Railway in 1888, and the line serving Barrie would become a branch of the Canadian National Railway (CNR). Throughout the latter half of the 19th century, steamships ran from Barrie to the Muskoka Territory, Orillia and other communities and stages were taking passengers to Penetanguishene.

The period of 1870 to 1890 defined Barrie's downtown development with a series of raging fires that sequentially destroyed multiple landmarks, giving rise to the moniker that Barrie was "among the best burning towns in Canada." Many local businesses like breweries, tanneries and sawmills depended on fire to operate, endangering the ramshackle assortment of wooden homes and buildings that made up the city centre.

One of the most destructive fires came in mid-1875 when the entire section north of Dunlop Street to Collier Street, bounded by Clapperton and Owen Streets, was reduced to ash, destroying around 20 local businesses.

=== 20th century ===
In the next century, the modern streets and buildings of Barrie began to take form in a massive rebuilding process. Other landmarks to eventually burn down over the years include the Queen's Hotel (1915) and two of Barrie's largest and most prominent companies; the Sevigny Carriage Shop and the Anderton Brewery in 1916.

During the First World War, residents of Barrie helped to construct Canadian Forces Base Borden (CFB Borden) as a means of additional support and to serve as a major training centre of Canadian Expeditionary Force battalions. The base would open on July 11, 1916, and since then has become the largest Canadian Forces Base in Canada, playing an important role through the remainder of the war by training some 350,000 troops for deployment in Europe. During World War II, the Royal Canadian Navy named a Flower-class corvette HMCS Barrie.

On September 7, 1977, a private aircraft, owned by Falconbridge Nickel Mines Ltd, dropped altitude to 500 feet (152 m) in dense fog and struck CKVR's 1,000-foot (305 m) transmitter tower, killing all five people aboard the plane and destroying the tower and antenna. The station's 225-foot (69 m) auxiliary tower was also destroyed with damage to the main studio building. CKVR returned to the air on September 19 at a reduced power of 40,000 watts until a new 1,000-foot (305 m) tower was built in 1978.

The 1980s and 1990s was a period of substantial growth for Barrie, with the population tripling in the span of 25 years. In 1981, the city had a population of 38,423; in 2006, Barrie had 128,430 residents living within city limits. The first larger scale developments would begin during this time, including high-density waterfront condos and the new Barrie City Hall which started construction in October 1985.

On May 31, 1985, Barrie was struck by a devastating F4 tornado that killed eight people. Over 600 homes were damaged or destroyed by the tornado, and of those roughly one-third were rendered uninhabitable. About 155 people were also injured during the storm, and the tornado remains today one of the most destructive and violent in Canadian history. The tornado caused $150 million (1985 CAD), equivalent to $326 million CAD as of 2022.

Between June 12–13, 1987, a sculpture called Spirit Catcher by Ron Baird was moved to Barrie from Vancouver, British Columbia, where it had been exhibited as part of Expo '86. The sculpture was permanently erected at the foot of Maple Avenue on the shore of Kempenfelt Bay and has since become a major Barrie landmark and tourist attraction. However, with the re-development along the waterfront and Lakeshore Drive, the city is considering moving the Spirit Catcher to a gravel outcropping at the foot of Bayfield Street.

=== 21st century ===
On January 10, 2004, the former Molson's plant was found to be home to an illegal marijuana grow-op housing an estimated 30,000 marijuana plants with an estimated street value of $30 million (~$48.9 million in 2025); at the time, it was the largest marijuana grow-op bust in Canada's history. The former owner of the brewery, who claimed to be unaware of the operation occurring, attempted to gain the profits from the selling of the property after the Government of Ontario forcefully sold it, which was successful. In 2020, the owner attempted to sue the government again, claiming that the costs from the governments investigation into the property and the civil costs were misconduct and should've been paid back to him in full. A lower court ruled in favour of the owner, but the government filed an appeal with the Court of Appeal for Ontario, which is still undecided.

Barrie's Park Place (formerly Molson Park) was chosen to host Live 8 Canada on July 2, 2005. The overall success of the concert helped support a plan to convert the former Molson Park lands into a commercial district. Construction of Park Place began in 2008 but was temporarily interrupted by the Great Recession and an Ontario Municipal Board (OMB) appeal that proposed a rezoning of the Park Place lands that was initially denied by the City of Barrie. Construction resumed in 2010.

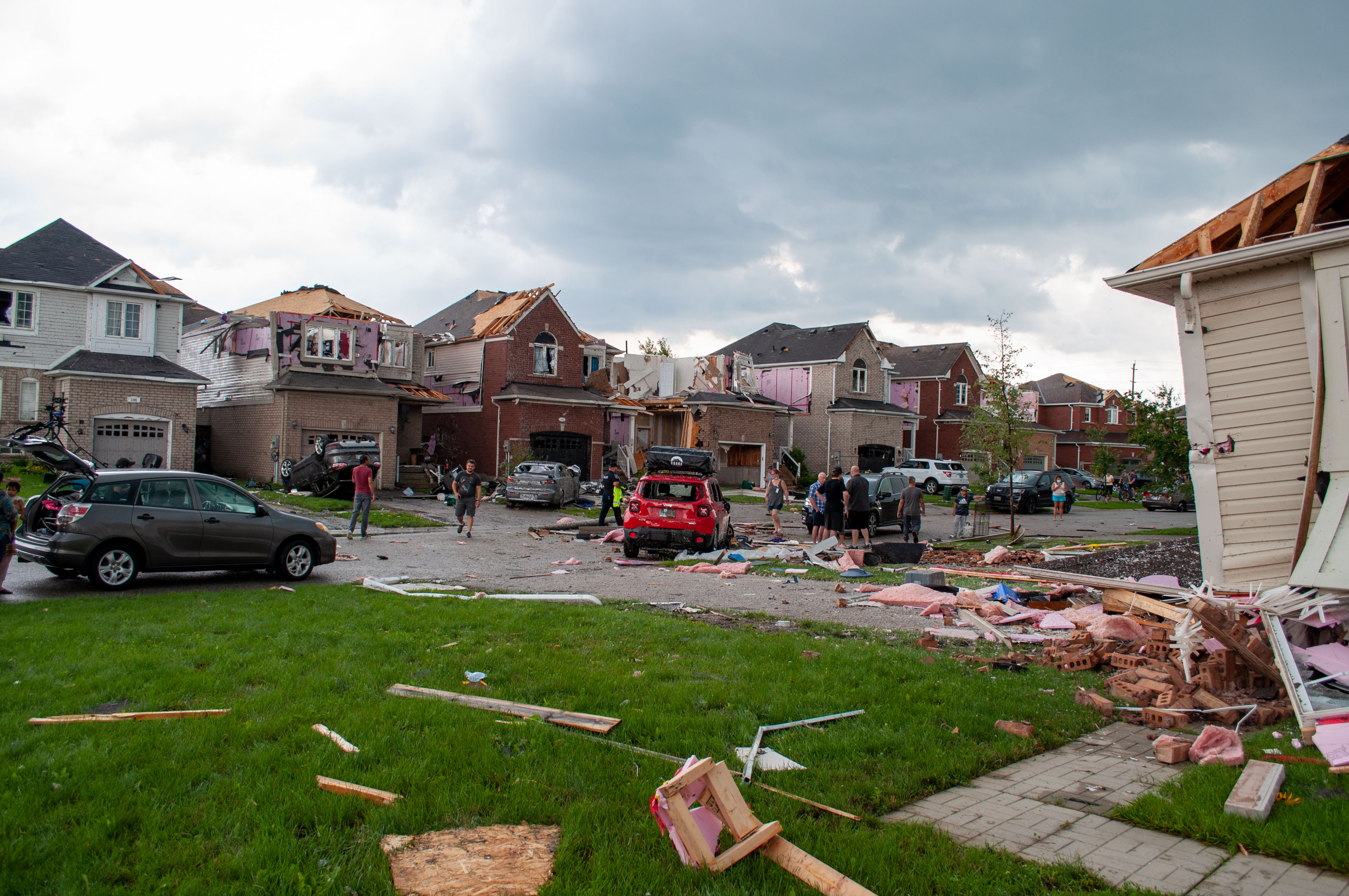
July 15, 2021, tornado damage

An explosion in the Royal Thai restaurant, housed in the landmark Wellington Hotel at the "Five Points" intersection in downtown Barrie, occurred at 11:20pm on December 6, 2007. The fire quickly spread to several neighbouring buildings and firefighters battled the blaze well into the following morning, requiring assistance from other Simcoe County fire services. Officials estimated the damages to be in the millions. The 100-year-old Wellington Hotel building collapsed later in the morning. On February 17, 2008, two people were charged in connection with the fire after the Ontario Fire Marshal's office concluded the explosion and subsequent fire were the result of arson.

In 2013, Barrie was twinned with the English town of Harrogate as a result of Sir Robert Barrie's close connection to it.

On July 15, 2021, a tornado struck neighbourhoods in south Barrie, leaving several people injured and causing serious damage to property. Environment Canada categorized it as an EF2 on the Enhanced Fujita scale.

== Geography ==
Barrie is located in the central portion of southern Ontario, approximately 90 km (56 mi) north of Toronto within the Greater Golden Horseshoe subregion. It is accessible via Highways 26, 400 and 11 and has convenient access to Highway 401, the Highway 407 Express Toll Route, and to neighbouring Toronto. Toronto Pearson International Airport is less than a one-hour drive from Barrie via Highway 400.

Barrie's historic downtown area is situated in a distinct curved or wrapped valley, surrounding the western edge of Kempenfelt Bay. Terrain is generally flat near the city's centre. Moving up the valley slopes toward the city's north and south ends, the terrain can be rather steep in some areas. The minimum elevation of Barrie is 175 metres (574 ft) around the shores of Kempenfelt Bay and the maximum elevation is 427 metres (1,401 ft) northwest of the Lake Simcoe Regional Airport.

Barrie falls into Plant Hardiness Zone 5b. The city does not have any major rivers within its limits but does have numerous creeks and streams, most of which empty into Kempenfelt Bay.

=== Intraurban communities ===
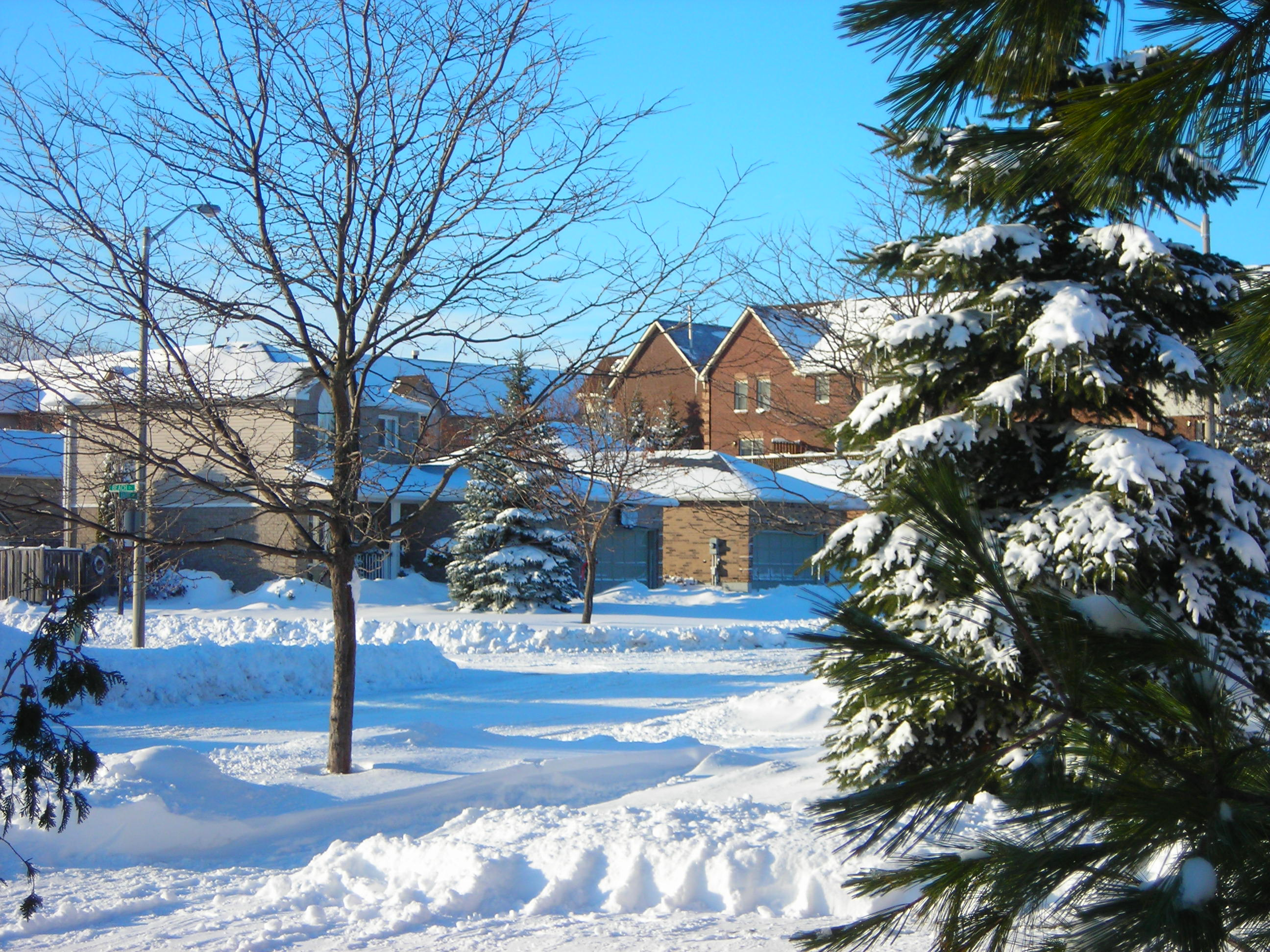
Residential condominiums and houses in Barrie after a snowfall

- Allandale
- Ardagh Bluffs
- Craighurst
- Crown Hill
- Cundles
- Dalston
- Downtown
- Eastview
- Ferndale
- Holly
- Horseshoe Valley
- Letitia Heights
- Little Lake
- Minet's Point
- Painswick
- St. Paul's
- The Grove

=== Expansion ===
Barrie has been designated an Urban Growth Centre by the province of Ontario. As one of the fastest growing cities in Canada, this designation aims to mitigate urban sprawl and concentrate higher-density development in areas specified by the City of Barrie. Its population growth can be attributed to the emergence of the city as a bedroom community for Toronto. In 1991, Barrie had a population of 62,728 and by 2017, Barrie had an estimated population of 147,000. By 2031, the city's population is expected to exceed 200,000 people. To plan for the continued growth of the city, Barrie successfully annexed 2,293 hectares (5,670 acres) of land from the neighbouring Town of Innisfil to the south and southeast on January 1, 2010. The annexation comprised lands south beyond McKay Road and west of the 10th Sideroad, and as far south as Lockhart Road on the east side of the 10th Sideroad.

On January 1, 2026, Barrie again annexed 1,769 hectares (4,370 acres) of land, this time from Springwater Township, in two separate sections (with the area in between, centred on Bayfield Street, being serviced by Barrie's municipal water and sewer systems), expanding its area to the north, west, and east (north of Kempenfelt Bay).

Intensification and infilling are simultaneously being undertaken in and near the downtown core to foster a more active urban environment within the city.

== Climate ==
Barrie has a humid continental climate (Köppen climate classification Dfb), with warm, humid summers, and cold, snowy winters.

Winters are cold with frequent snowfall, the January average high temperature being −3.2 °C (26 °F), with a mean temperature of −7.8 °C (18 °F). Barrie is located in a snowbelt, a region that experiences regular lake-effect snow every year. Snow squalls are a common occurrence between November and January when the water temperature is often higher than the cold air passing over Lake Huron and Georgian Bay. The city averages 286 centimetres (113 in) of snow annually, the brunt of which coming from lake-effect snow events. Alberta clippers and Colorado lows also generate ample snowfall in the region. Snow cover begins to build by the end of November, accumulating through December, and then lies through the end of February. March sees the spring thaw commence, with the snow cover being essentially gone by the beginning of April. Temperatures commonly drop to −20.0 °C (−4 °F) and occasionally drop to −30.0 °C (−22 °F) on the coldest nights of the year.

Summers in Barrie are warm with sometimes short stretches of hot, humid conditions. The average temperature in July is 20.1 °C (68 °F).Thunderstorms are very common in the summer months in Barrie due to the city being in a Great Lakes breeze convergence zone. Also a result, there storms are occasionally severe, bringing with them torrential rain, very strong winds and hail. Tornadoes are generally rare in the city however the deadly F4 rated Tornado did strike Barrie. In July 2021, an EF2 Tornado also hit the city. Barrie's average frost-free period is from May 26 to September 16, allowing a growing season of 113 days.

Precipitation falls year round but is typically heaviest in the summer months due to thunderstorm activity. The driest months are February through April, receiving around 60.0 millimetres (2 in) of precipitation each month per annum. The wettest months are August and September, seeing upwards of 90.0 millimetres (4 in) of precipitation each month. November is also a wet month, receiving 88.9 millimetres (4 in) of precipitation in the form of both rain and snow. October remains relatively dry in comparison to the months preceding and succeeding it. Despite this however, October has the most precipitation days and rainy days out of every month with 15.6 and 15.5 respectively.

The coldest temperature ever recorded in Barrie was −38.9 °C (−38 °F) on January 8, 1886. The hottest temperature ever recorded was 38.9 °C (102 °F) on July 5, 1911.

Climate data for Barrie Water Pollution Control Centre (1981–2010 normals, extremes 1866–present) (Note: The extreme temperatures listed are from 1866 to present.)
Month	Jan	Feb	Mar	Apr	May	Jun	Jul	Aug	Sep	Oct	Nov	Dec	Year
Record high °C (°F)	18.3 (64.9)	14.0 (57.2)	25.9 (78.6)	30.5 (86.9)	35.0 (95.0)	35.6 (96.1)	38.9 (102.0)	37.8 (100.0)	36.7 (98.1)	30.0 (86.0)	24.3 (75.7)	19.5 (67.1)	38.9 (102.0)
Mean daily maximum °C (°F)	−2.9 (26.8)	−1.5 (29.3)	3.2 (37.8)	11.0 (51.8)	18.1 (64.6)	23.6 (74.5)	26.3 (79.3)	25.1 (77.2)	20.7 (69.3)	13.5 (56.3)	6.5 (43.7)	0.4 (32.7)	12.0 (53.6)
Daily mean °C (°F)	−7.7 (18.1)	−6.6 (20.1)	−2.1 (28.2)	5.6 (42.1)	12.3 (54.1)	17.9 (64.2)	20.8 (69.4)	19.7 (67.5)	15.3 (59.5)	8.7 (47.7)	2.7 (36.9)	−3.5 (25.7)	6.9 (44.4)
Mean daily minimum °C (°F)	−12.4 (9.7)	−11.7 (10.9)	−7.4 (18.7)	0.2 (32.4)	6.5 (43.7)	12.3 (54.1)	15.3 (59.5)	14.3 (57.7)	10.0 (50.0)	3.9 (39.0)	−1.0 (30.2)	−7.3 (18.9)	1.9 (35.4)
Record low °C (°F)	−38.9 (−38.0)	−37.2 (−35.0)	−34.5 (−30.1)	−19.4 (−2.9)	−7.2 (19.0)	−2.2 (28.0)	2.2 (36.0)	0.0 (32.0)	−3.9 (25.0)	−9.4 (15.1)	−24.2 (−11.6)	−36.7 (−34.1)	−38.9 (−38.0)
Average precipitation mm (inches)	82.5 (3.25)	61.8 (2.43)	58.1 (2.29)	62.2 (2.45)	82.4 (3.24)	84.8 (3.34)	77.2 (3.04)	89.9 (3.54)	94.0 (3.70)	77.5 (3.05)	88.9 (3.50)	73.6 (2.90)	932.9 (36.73)
Average rainfall mm (inches)	16.6 (0.65)	16.0 (0.63)	29.2 (1.15)	56.6 (2.23)	82.3 (3.24)	84.8 (3.34)	77.2 (3.04)	89.9 (3.54)	94.0 (3.70)	75.2 (2.96)	66.0 (2.60)	22.2 (0.87)	709.9 (27.95)
Average snowfall cm (inches)	65.9 (25.9)	45.9 (18.1)	29.0 (11.4)	5.7 (2.2)	0.1 (0.0)	0.0 (0.0)	0.0 (0.0)	0.0 (0.0)	0.0 (0.0)	2.3 (0.9)	22.8 (9.0)	51.4 (20.2)	223.0 (87.8)
Average precipitation days (≥ 0.2 mm)	14.9	12.3	11.6	12.2	12.9	11.4	11.1	11.8	13.3	15.6	15.4	13.8	156.1
Average rainy days (≥ 0.2 mm)	2.8	3.0	5.4	11.3	12.9	11.4	11.1	11.8	13.3	15.5	11.3	4.6	114.4
Average snowy days (≥ 0.2 cm)	12.4	10.0	6.8	1.5	0.04	0.0	0.0	0.0	0.0	0.54	4.5	9.6	45.5
Source: Environment and Climate Change Canada

== Demographics ==
Historical populations
Year	Pop.	±%
1841	500	—
1871	3,398	+579.6%
1881	4,854	+42.8%
1891	5,550	+14.3%
1901	5,949	+7.2%
1911	6,420	+7.9%
1921	6,936	+8.0%
1931	7,776	+12.1%
1941	9,559	+22.9%
1951	12,514	+30.9%
1961	21,169	+69.2%
1971	27,676	+30.7%
1981	38,423	+38.8%
1991	62,728	+63.3%
1996	79,191	+26.2%
2001	103,710	+31.0%
2006	128,430	+23.8%
2011	136,063	+5.9%
2016	141,434	+3.9%
2021	147,829	+4.5%
Note: 2011 census population corrected by Statistics Canada

In the 2021 Census of Population conducted by Statistics Canada, Barrie had a population of 147,829 living in 55,316 of its 57,276 total private dwellings, a change of 4.5% from its 2016 population of 141,434. With a land area of 99.01 km^{2} (38.23 sq mi), it had a population density of 1,493.1/km^{2} (3,867.0/sq mi) in 2021.

At the census metropolitan area (CMA) level in the 2021 census, the Barrie CMA had a population of 212,856 living in 78,540 of its 82,649 total private dwellings, a change of 8% from its 2016 population of 197,059. With a land area of 897.26 km^{2} (346.43 sq mi), it had a population density of 237.2/km^{2} (614.4/sq mi) in 2021.

Canada census – Barrie community profile

	2021	2016	2011
Population	147,829 (+4.5% from 2016)	141,434 (3.9% from 2011)	136,063 (5.9% from 2006)
Land area	99.01 km^{2} (38.23 sq mi)	99.04 km^{2} (38.24 sq mi)	77.39 km^{2} (29.88 sq mi)
Population density	1,493.1/km^{2} (3,867/sq mi)	1,428.0/km^{2} (3,699/sq mi)	1,758.1/km^{2} (4,553/sq mi)
Median age	39.2 (M: 37.6, F: 40.8)	38.5 (M: 36.9, F: 40.0)	37.2 (M: 36.0, F: 38.3)
Private dwellings	57,276 (total) 55,316 (occupied)	54,227 (total)	50,075 (total)
Median household income	$93,000	$113,575	$80,928

References: 2021 2016 2011

=== Ethnicity ===
As of the 2021 census Barrie was approximately 77.9% white, 17.1% visible minorities and 5.0% Indigenous. The largest visible minority groups in the city were South Asian (4.4%), Black (3.9%), Latin American (2%), Chinese (1.6%) and Filipino (1.4%).

Largest non-European panethnic group in Barrie CMA by census tract based on the 2021 census

Panethnic groups in the City of Barrie (2001−2021)
Panethnic group	2021		2016		2011		2006		2001	
Panethnic group	Pop.	%	Pop.	%	Pop.	%	Pop.	%	Pop.	%
European (Note: Statistic includes all persons that did not make up part of a visible minority or an indigenous identity.)	115,215	79.25%	119,535	85.96%	119,705	89.84%	115,650	91.19%	95,865	93.67%
South Asian	6,435	4.43%	3,035	2.18%	1,760	1.32%	1,590	1.25%	990	0.97%
African	5,670	3.9%	3,695	2.66%	2,525	1.9%	1,880	1.48%	1,185	1.16%
Indigenous	5,320	3.66%	5,255	3.78%	3,440	2.58%	2,660	2.1%	1,520	1.49%
East Asian (Note: Statistic includes total responses of "Chinese", "Korean", and "Japanese" under visible minority section on census.)	3,255	2.24%	2,450	1.76%	1,790	1.34%	1,600	1.26%	1,195	1.17%
Southeast Asian (Note: Statistic includes total responses of "Filipino" and "Southeast Asian" under visible minority section on census.)	3,035	2.09%	1,885	1.36%	1,455	1.09%	1,275	1.01%	555	0.54%
Latin American	2,910	2%	1,465	1.05%	1,105	0.83%	1,020	0.8%	540	0.53%
Middle Eastern (Note: Statistic includes total responses of "West Asian" and "Arab" under visible minority section on census.)	1,875	1.29%	720	0.52%	450	0.34%	555	0.44%	320	0.31%
Other (Note: Statistic includes total responses of "Visible minority, n.i.e." and "Multiple visible minorities" under visible minority section on census.)	1,660	1.14%	1,020	0.73%	1,015	0.76%	585	0.46%	180	0.18%
Total responses	145,385	98.35%	139,060	98.32%	133,240	98.18%	126,830	98.75%	102,345	98.68%
Total population	147,829	100%	141,434	100%	135,711	100%	128,430	100%	103,710	100%

- Note: Totals greater than 100% due to multiple origin responses.

=== Religion ===
Largest non-Christian religion in Barrie CMA by census tract based on the 2021 census

According to the 2021 Census, Barrie was 52.5% Christian, down from 66.3% in 2011. 23.6% of Barrie residents were Catholic, 15.9% were Protestants, 8.2% were Christians of unspecified denomination, and 1.5% were Christian Orthodox. Adherents to other denominations of Christianity and Christian-related traditions accounted for 3.4% of the population. 40.8% of Barrie residents were nonreligious/secular, up from 31.0% in 2011. All other religions and spiritual traditions combined make up 6.7% of residents. The largest non-Christian religions in Barrie are Islam (2.5%), Hinduism (1.5%), and Sikhism (0.8%).

== Economy ==
- Royal Victoria Regional Health Centre
- Georgian College and the associated University Partnership Centre and Centre for Health and Wellness
- City of Barrie
- County of Simcoe
- Simcoe County District School Board
- TD Canada Trust and TD Waterhouse Regional Centre
- TD Canada Trust Technology and Operations Centre
- Scotiabank Regional Centre
- BMO Data Centre
- IBM Canada Leadership Data Centre
- Coca-Cola Bottling Company
- Canadian Mental Health Association – Simcoe
- Hydro One Ontario Grid Control Centre

Notwithstanding these major employers, Barrie has increasingly been perceived as a bedroom community for the City of Toronto, which is approximately 90 km (56 mi) south of Barrie. In recent decades however Barrie's economy has diversified, and the local population's reliance on commuting to Toronto has decreased. The city's economy is rooted in retail, education, healthcare, services, manufacturing and technology. Major employers in the city include the Simcoe County District School Board with 6,000 employees along with the Simcoe Muskoka Catholic District School Board with 3,400 employees, Georgian College with 2,500 employees and the Royal Victoria Hospital with 2,465 employees.

Barrie has emerged as a growing tech-hub with several companies such as IBM and BMO constructing data centres in the city. Although not as prominent as cities like Markham or Waterloo in the tech industry, Barrie is considered one of the best high-tech centres in the country for small markets.

=== Tourism ===
Tourism plays an important role in the local economy. Barrie's historic downtown and waterfront are at the heart of its tourism industry. Downtown Barrie has a number of older buildings that have been kept up over the years or given new facades that exemplify their historical importance. Several specialty shops, boutiques, pubs and restaurants are located throughout downtown Barrie, including along Dunlop Street East. Downtown Barrie is becoming well known for its fashion boutiques, local art, live theatre, indie-music and nightlife scenes. In addition, downtown Barrie is home to several annual festivals and events such as The Barrie Waterfront Festival, Barrielicious, Winterfest, Celebrate Barrie, Ecofest, Jazz & Blues Festival, Promenade Days, Ribfest and Craft Beer Show, Caribfest, Lawnchair Luminata, Kempenfest, The New Music Festival, Barrie Film Festival, Santa Claus Parade and the New Year's Countdown.

In the summer months, the city has several beaches including Minet's Point Beach, Johnsons Beach, The Gables, Tyndale Beach, and Centennial Beach. Boating is also popular in Kempenfelt Bay and Lake Simcoe as it connects to the Trent Severn Waterway. In 2011, Barrie's waterfront was under redevelopment, with the relocation of several roadways to provide more greenspace and parkland along the lakeshore. There are a number of winter recreation activities and facilities in the surrounding area, including skiing, snow tubing and snowboarding resorts, snowmobile, snowshoe and Nordic skiing trails, and ice fishing. Recreational activities include skiing at nearby Horseshoe Valley Resort, Snow Valley, Mount St. Louis Moonstone, Blue Mountain and Hardwood Ski and Bike.

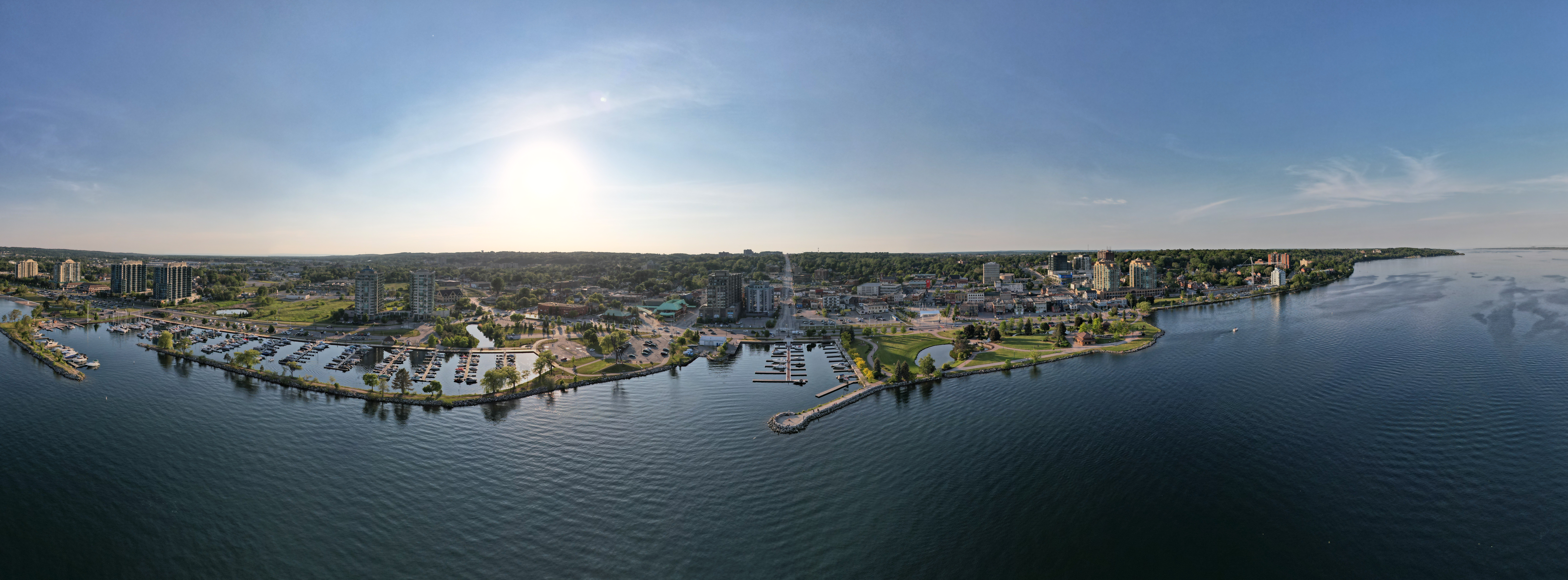
360° panorama of the Barrie Waterfront

== Arts and culture ==
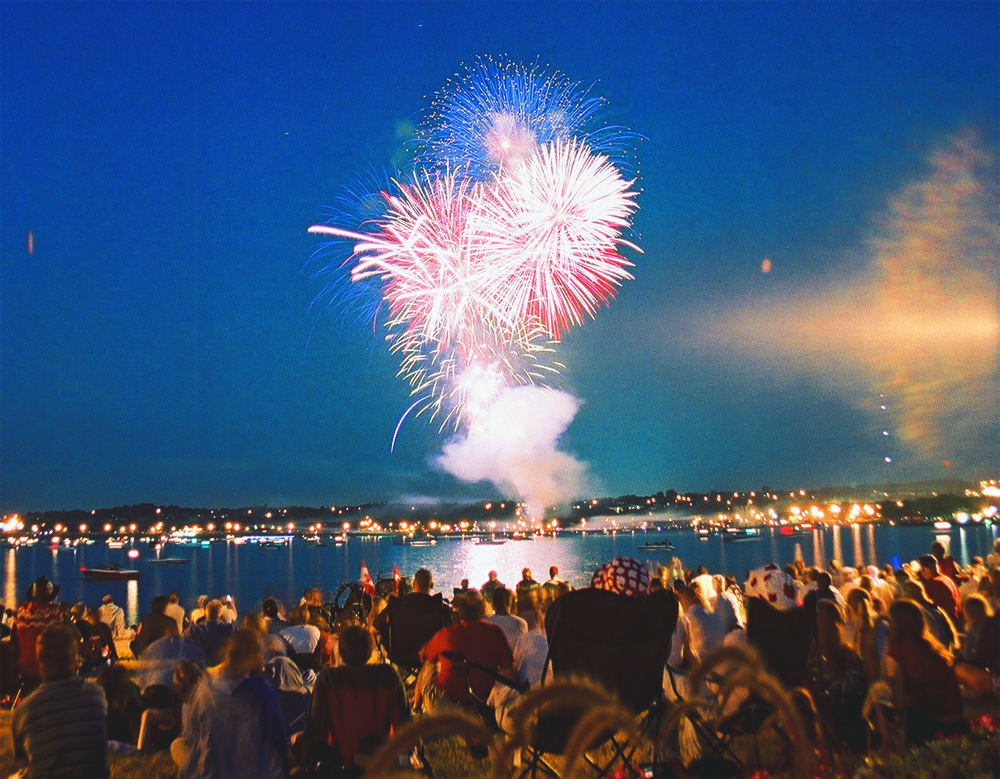
Fireworks over Kempenfelt Bay during Barrie's Canada Day celebrations

Barrie is home to a number of performing and fine art venues. There are a number of live performance companies including Theatre by the Bay, Talk Is Free Theatre and the Huronia Symphony. Grove Park Home is the practice hall for On-Stage Performance Group which performs in Cookstown. The Strolling Youth Players and the Kempenfelt Community Players also all perform in Barrie. In addition, an annual live concert series is hosted by Georgian College.

=== Performing arts ===
There are two main performing arts venues in the city: the Five Points Theatre, and the Georgian Theatre. Originally, the Five Points Theatre was known as The Mady Centre For The Performing Arts, but it was renamed in January 2018. It is located in Barrie's downtown at the Five Points intersection and was completed in 2011. This modern facility is home to many professional and amateur cultural productions, film screenings, theatrical plays, concerts, dance recitals and other performances. It is also the main venue for Theatre by the Bay and the Talk Is Free Theatre Companies. The venue features a flexible stage area with lighting and sound for professional theatre, music, dance, and other presentations, an automated riser/seating system with capacity for 120-200 seats and a sprung performance floor.

The Georgian Theatre is a professional performing arts facility located in Barrie's north end on the campus of Georgian College. The theatre features a proscenium stage, sound, lights, fly gallery and seating for 427 on the main level, with three pods that can be used to increase the seating capacity to 690. The Theatre is used both for theatrical and non-theatrical activity, including conferences and seminars.

=== Galleries ===
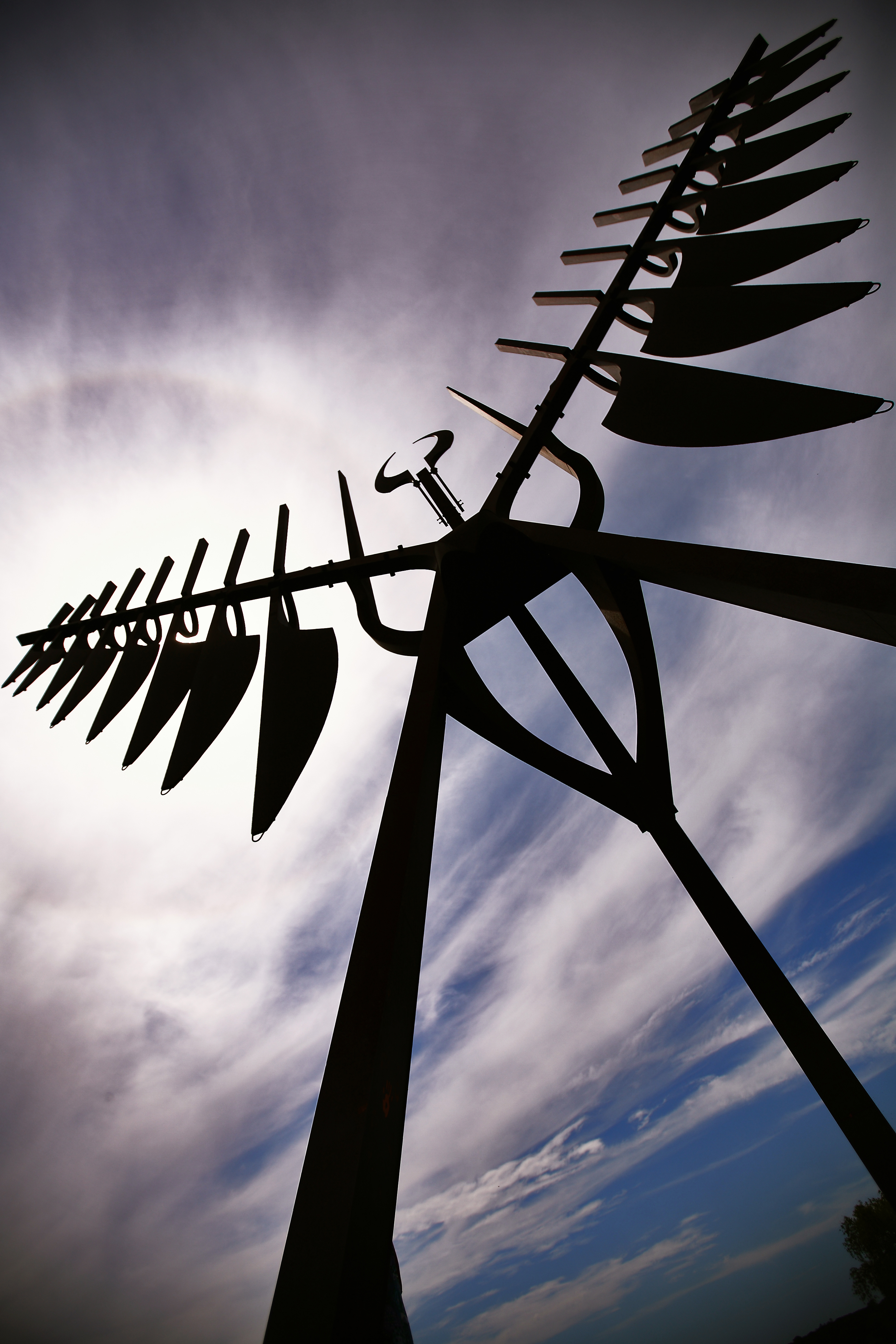
Ron Baird's The Spirit Catcher (1986), installed along the waterfront in Barrie

The prominent MacLaren Art Centre is located in Barrie. This is an art gallery that inspired the "Art City" project, which has had many different large sculptures installed around the city. These can be found in parks and along the waterfront.

Barrie is also home to many independent galleries and studios. A concentration of independent galleries, studios and boutiques is located in Lakeshore Mews. This area is located behind the downtown's Dunlop Street. Lakeshore Mews artists also organize the annual "Arts ce Soir"; an all-night contemporary art event in celebration of visual, musical, theatrical and literary art.

In addition, a studio tour in the Barrie/Orillia area takes place on the Canadian Thanksgiving weekend every year. It is called the Images Studio Tour and has over 25 artists on average. Potters, jewellers, painters, textile artists and fashion designers make up a few of the disciplines of the talents on display.

=== Festivals ===
Barrie is home to Kempenfest; one of the largest outdoor arts and crafts celebrations in Ontario. This festival occurs annually over the August long weekend and features over 300 artisans, an antique show, food demonstrations, children's activities and live entertainment, including an indie-music stage.

Since 2021, Barrie has held Open Air Dunlop, in which Dunlop Street downtown is temporarily pedestrianized to attract visitors to the downtown area.

=== Groups ===
Some of the main arts and culture groups in the city include:

- Barrie Art Club
- Barrie Concert Band
- Barrie Film Festival
- Barrie Folk Society
- Campus Gallery
- Caribbean Culture Institute
- Huronia Symphony Orchestra
- Kempenfelt Community Players
- King Edward Choir
- Lyrica Chamber Choir
- Simcoe Contemporary Dancers
- Talk Is Free Theatre
- Theatre By The Bay
- Kiwanis

== Attractions ==
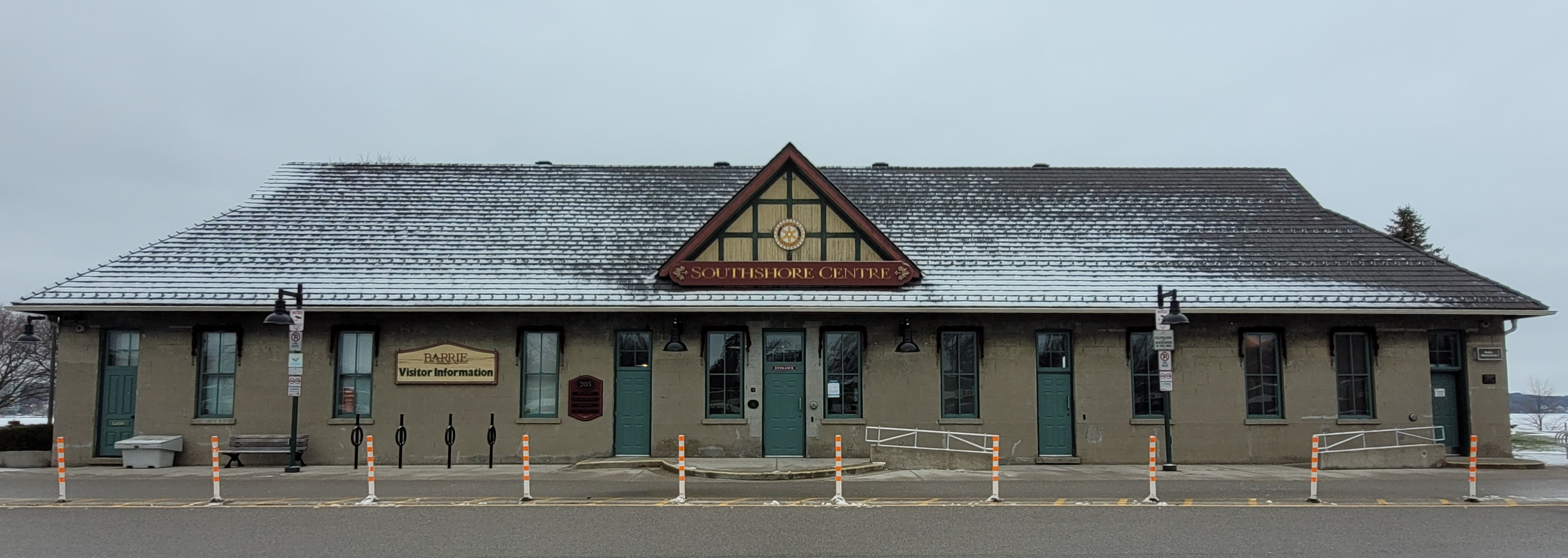
Southshore Community Centre

Barrie has numerous recreational venues and community centres throughout the city:

- Allandale Recreation Centre
- Barrie Community Sports Complex
- Barrie Public Library
- Dorian Parker Centre
- East Bayfield Community Centre
- Eastview Arena
- Holly Community Centre
- Lampman Park
- Lampman Lane Community Centre
- MacLaren Art Centre
- Parkview Community Centre
- Southshore Community Centre
- Victoria Village
- YMCA of Barrie
- Shak's World Community Centre

== Sports ==
Club	Sport	League	Venue	Established	Championships
Simcoe County Rovers FC	Soccer	PSLC	J.C. Massie Field at Georgian College	2022	1
Barrie MLS NEXT Pro	Soccer	MLSNP	J.C. Massie Field at Georgian College	2014	0
Barrie Colts	Hockey	OHL	Sadlon Arena	1995	1

Barrie is also home to the Mariposa School of Skating, which has trained many world-class figure skaters, including Brian Orser, Elvis Stojko and Jeffrey Buttle.

== Government ==
=== Municipal ===
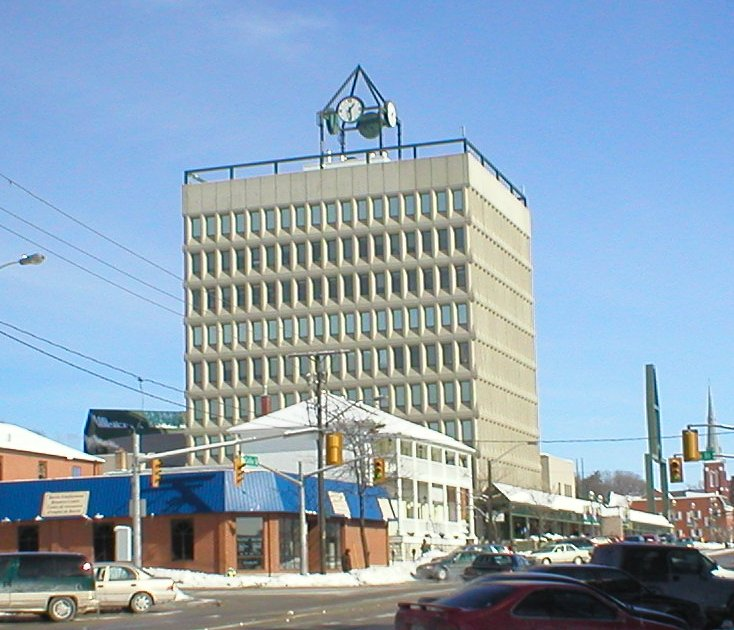
The city hall of Barrie

The current mayor of Barrie is Alex Nuttall, who was re-elected on October 26, 2026. He was voted to office in October 2022, succeeding Jeff Lehman.

=== Provincial ===
Barrie federal election results
Year	Liberal		Conservative		New Democratic		Green	
2021	32%	20,883	43%	28,394	18%	12,109	0%	0
2019	32%	22,225	38%	26,508	17%	11,875	11%	7,536

Barrie provincial election results
Year	PC		New Democratic		Liberal		Green	
2022	43%	19,444	14%	6,524	32%	14,216	5%	2,467
2018	44%	25,181	31%	17,805	14%	7,986	10%	5,914

Party	Members of Provincial Parliament	From	To	Riding
Progressive Conservative	Andrea Khanjin	June 7, 2018	present	Barrie—Innisfil
Progressive Conservative	Doug Downey	June 7, 2018	present	Barrie—Springwater—Oro-Medonte

=== Federal ===
Party	Members of Parliament	From	To	Riding
Conservative	John Brassard	October 19, 2015	present	Barrie—Innisfil
Conservative	Doug Shipley	October 21, 2019	present	Barrie—Springwater—Oro-Medonte

=== Military ===
Barrie has a long military history dating back to at least the Nine Mile Portage of the War of 1812. By the time of the 1837 Rebellion, Simcoe County had a sufficient population to form a battalion of Sedentary Militia of almost 600 strong. This battalion was involved in marching suspected rebels down Yonge Street to Toronto in order to face justice. By 1855, Barrie was home to an independent company of Rifle Company of militia, followed in 1863 by a company of Infantry. These companies served during the Fenian Raids. With the Militia Act of 1866, the companies in Barrie were respectively organized as Number 1 and Number 5 companies, in the newly formed 35th Battalion of Infantry (Simcoe Foresters), gazetted on September 14, 1866.

In 1885, four companies from the 35th Simcoe Foresters, including those from Barrie, along with four companies from the 12th York Battalion came together to form the York-Simcoe Battalion. This specially raised battalion served in Western Canada during the North-West Rebellion, under the command of Lieutenant-Colonel W.E. O'Brien of Shanty Bay, Ontario. For its efforts, The Simcoe Foresters received its first Battle Honour "North West Canada 1885". Citizens of Barrie would next volunteer for military service during the Boer War in South Africa from 1899 to 1902. It was during this conflict that at the Battle of Paardeberg, the citizens of Barrie and The Simcoe Foresters suffered their first fatal casualty, Private James Halkett Findlay. Private Findlay was killed-in-action on February 18, 1900, while serving with C Company of the 2nd Battalion Royal Canadian Regiment of Infantry.

In 1914, the First World War broke out and many citizens of Barrie were quick to volunteer for service overseas with The Simcoe Foresters. Late the following year, the Regiment was tasked with raising two overseas battalions, the 157th Battalion (Simcoe Foresters), CEF and the 177th Battalion (Simcoe Foresters), CEF. In the spring of 1916, the Barrie and Collingwood companies of the 157th Battalion began clearing the land for the construction of a new military camp on the Simcoe Pines Plain — Camp Borden (now CFB Borden). This began Barrie's long friendship with the Base, hence the reason CFB Borden was used for Canada's Worst Driver 2 and Canada's Worst Driver 5.

With a re-organization of the Canadian Militia between the two world wars, The Simcoe Foresters, headquartered in Barrie, were amalgamated in 1936 with the Grey Regiment, headquartered at Owen Sound, Ontario. This event created the present-day regiment of The Grey and Simcoe Foresters, which is headquartered at the Armoury in Queen's Park, downtown Barrie. With the outbreak of the Second World War in 1939, citizens of Barrie volunteered for service overseas with The Grey and Simcoe Foresters, the Royal Canadian Navy and the Royal Canadian Air Force. The City of Barrie sponsored a ship in the Royal Canadian Navy, HMCS Barrie, a Flower-class corvette.

== Transportation ==
=== Airports ===
There are no major airports with scheduled flights near Barrie (the closest being Toronto Pearson International Airport, located in Mississauga). There are a few airports that are used for light aviation aircraft:

- Lake Simcoe Regional Airport
- Barrie/Little Lake Water Aerodrome
- Springwater (Barrie Airpark) Aerodrome

=== Roads ===
Barrie is served by Highway 400, which acts as the primary route between Barrie and Toronto. Highway 400 bisects the city on a roughly north–south basis. Highway 26, also located in the city, is the main route to the Collingwood area and is known as Bayfield Street within the city limits. Barrie was once served by Highway 27, Highway 90, Highway 93, Highway 131 and Highway 11. However, the province downgraded many highways in 1997 and 1998; these highways are now known as Simcoe County Road 27, Simcoe County Road 90 (Dunlop Street), and Simcoe County Road 93.

The portion of Highway 11 through Barrie is known as Yonge Street, though it is actually part of the Penetanguishene Road. Major arterial roads within the city include Mapleview Drive, Ferndale Drive, 10th Line, Big Bay Point Road, Essa Road, Huronia Road, Bayfield Street, Cundles Road, Anne Street, Dunlop Street, Livingstone Street, Duckworth Street, Wellington Street and St. Vincent Street.

=== Public transit ===
Public transport is provided by Barrie Transit, which operates numerous bus routes within the city. Accessible transit is offered by booking with city run Barrie Accessible Community Transportation Service. Most regular bus routes operated by Barrie Transit are accessible using low floor vehicles. Barrie also has GO Trains and Buses.

=== Commuter rail ===
GO Transit connects the city to the Greater Toronto Area through daily train service along the Barrie line, with trains operating from the Allandale Waterfront GO Station and the Barrie South GO Station. This is primarily a commuter rail service to the GTA, with southbound trips to Toronto's Union Station in the morning rush hour and northbound trips in the evening rush hour. Limited weekend service to and from Toronto is also operated. Barrie was once a stop for the Northlander train but re-routing resulted in the termination of service. The former Barrie station serving the Northlander still exists north of the Allandale GO Station.

=== Intercity and commuter buses ===
In addition to train service, GO Transit offers daily commuter-oriented bus service to the Greater Toronto Area. Ontario Northland operates bus routes from various locations to and from Barrie. All inter-urban buses operate from the Barrie Allandale Transit Terminal.

Barrie once had been served by various private interurban bus lines such as Penetang-Midland Coach Lines and Greyhound Canada, which ran buses between Barrie and Toronto's Yorkdale Bus Terminal. Greyhound operated QuickLink commuter service from Barrie to Toronto seven days a week. In the past Gray Coach offered service from Toronto to Barrie; the route was later acquired by Greyhound. Greyhound Canada ended all service in Ontario on May 13, 2021.

Barrie is also served by Simcoe County LINX, which provides services between municipalities within Simcoe County, including Orillia, Midland and Penetanguishine.

=== Passenger rail ===
Historically, Barrie was served by scheduled passenger rail service. Allandale Station was a stop for the Grand Trunk Railway, Canadian National Railway and Via Rail. In addition, Ontario Northland's Northlander used the station as a stop, as did CN Rail/Via Rail (namely The Canadian). Regular passenger rail service to the station ended in the 1980s and has largely been replaced by regional/commuter rail service.

== Education ==
Barrie has two major English school boards that operate inside the city at a public level. The Simcoe County District School Board administers a public education in Barrie and Simcoe County, while the Simcoe Muskoka Catholic District School Board administers to the Catholic population and serves the Simcoe and Muskoka areas. It also has two French school boards, Conseil scolaire catholique MonAvenir (formerly Conseil scolaire de district catholique Centre-Sud), the Catholic board, and Conseil scolaire Viamonde (CSV, formerly Conseil Scolaire de District du Centre-Sud-Ouest), the secular board. There are also several private schools both for K-8 and K-12.

=== High schools ===
Simcoe County school district:

- Barrie North Collegiate Institute
- Bear Creek Secondary School
- Eastview Secondary School
- Innisdale Secondary School
- Maple Ridge Secondary School

Simcoe Muskoka Catholic school district:

- St. Joseph's High School
- St. Peter's Catholic Secondary School
- St. Joan of Arc High School

Viamonde school district:

- Ecole secondaire Roméo Dallaire
  - It was named after Roméo Dallaire. It received its name in March 2010 after a referendum open to members of the school board, employees, students, and parents. It was scheduled to open on May 26, 2010. Dallaire was scheduled to visit the school that day.

MonAvenir school district:

- École secondaire catholique Nouvelle-Alliance

Private:

- Heritage Christian Academy (Baptist) Grades K4-12 (Ardagh Rd. Barrie)

=== Post-secondary ===
Georgian College's main campus, with over 10,000 full-time students and approximately 25,000 part-time students, is located in Barrie.

Lakehead University opened the Barrie STEM Hub in September 2026.

== Media ==
=== Online ===
Village Media operates BarrieToday.com.

=== Print ===
There are both semi-weekly and monthly newspapers serving the City of Barrie. The Barrie Advance, published by Metroland Media Group, is a free newspaper established in 1983 and delivered weekly (on Thursdays) to every residence in the city as well as residents of Springwater Township and parts of Oro-Medonte. The newspaper contains local news, classifieds, advertisements and flyers. Barrie Business is a free newsprint publication covering local and regional business news. Published monthly and distributed to every business in the City of Barrie through Canada Post, it seeks to highlight and support Barrie's local business community and events. The Barrie Examiner, established in 1864, was one of Canada's oldest daily newspapers. It was distributed five days a week (Tuesday to Saturday) to paid subscribers and also delivered to the remainder of the market free on Thursdays. The Examiner was one of several Postmedia Network newspapers purchased by Torstar in a transaction between the two companies in 2017. Following the acquisition, Torstar subsidiary Metroland Media Group announced the closure of the paper effective November 27, 2017.

=== Radio ===
Local radio stations serving Barrie and area include:

Frequency	Call sign	Branding	Format	Owner	Notes
FM 93.1	CHAY	Fresh Radio	Hot adult contemporary/Top 40	Corus Entertainment	
FM 95.7	CFJB	Rock 95	active rock	Central Ontario Broadcasting (Rock 95 Broadcasting (Barrie-Orillia) Ltd.)	
FM 98.5	CKEY-FM		tourist information	Douglas George Edwards	CKEY-FM, Tourist, Barrie - Canadian Communications Foundation CKEY-FM Barrie, ON - fccdata.org
FM 100.3	CJLF	Life 100.3	Christian radio	Trust Communications Ministries, Inc.	
FM 101.1	CIQB-FM	Big FM	Classic Hits	Corus Entertainment	
FM 106.7	CFRH-FM-1		Community radio (French)	Radio-Huronie(La Clé d'la Baie en Huronie, Association Culturelle Francophone)	Rebroadcaster of CFRH-FM Penetanguishene
FM 107.5	CKMB-FM	Kool FM	Hot adult contemporary	Central Ontario Broadcasting (Rock 95 Broadcasting (Barrie-Orillia) Ltd.)	

Other radio stations from Orillia, Midland, Newmarket, Toronto and the surrounding areas can also be heard in Barrie.

=== Television ===
CKVR-DT (currently part of the CTV 2 television system) is the only local television station in Barrie. It produces approximately 1.30 hours of local news on weekdays and 1 hour of local news on weekends.

Television stations and rebroadcasters based in the vicinity of Barrie Region are:

OTA virtual channel (PSIP)	OTA channel	Rogers Cable	Call Sign	Network	Notes
3.1	UHF	10	CKVR-DT	CTV 2	
7.1	7	3	CIII-DT	Global Television Network	
–	–	10	–	Rogers TV	Community channel for Rogers Cable subscribers

== Notable people ==
- Brent Burns (born 1985), professional ice hockey defenceman for the Colorado Avalanche
- Matthew Di Leo (born 1995), racing driver
- Mark Dilley (born 1969), racing driver
- Jessie Eldridge (born 1997), professional ice hockey forward in the PWHL
- Gary Goodridge (born 1966), mixed martial artist
- Mitchell Hooper (born 1995), strongman and winner of 2023 World's Strongest Man
- Rebecca Hornbrook (born 1975), atmospheric chemist at the National Center for Atmospheric Research
- Michael Hutchinson (born 1990), professional ice hockey goaltender
- Gordon Meeking (born 1890), retired NHL player
- Slava Pastuk (born 1990), drug smuggler, music journalist and author of Bad Trips
- Darrin Shannon (born 1969), retired NHL player
- Darryl Shannon (born 1968), retired NHL player
- Veronika Slowikowska (born 1995), actress and comedian
- Daniel Vandervoort (born 1994), CFL wide receiver
- Samantha Win (born 1991), actress and martial artist

== See also ==
- Barrie Police Service
- Barrie Speedway
- Georgian Mall
- Sandy Hollow Landfill
