= Kempenfelt Bay =

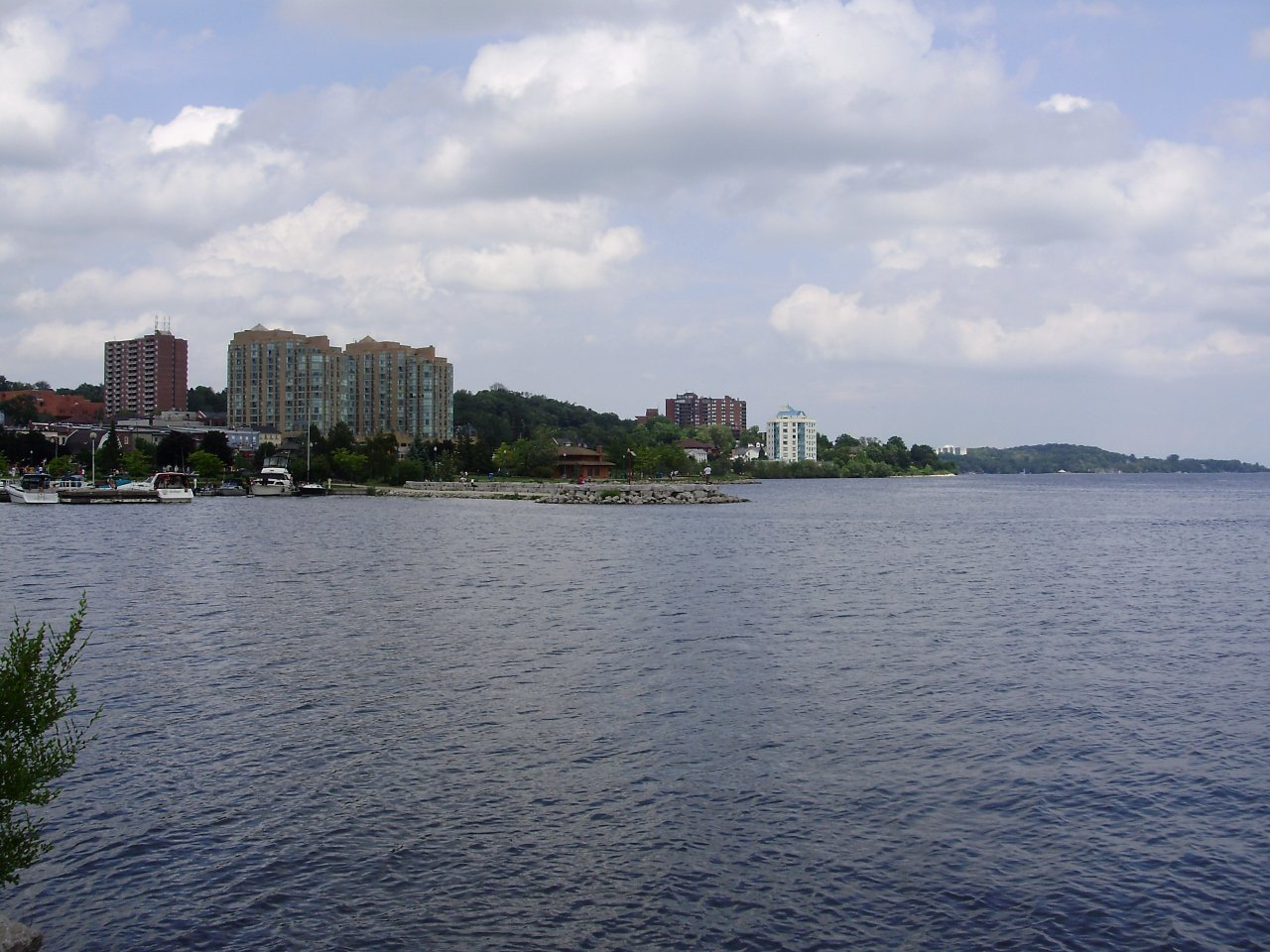
- Downtown Barrie curves around the shore of Kempenfelt Bay

- Location within Ontario
- Coordinates: 44.38571°N 79.61449°W
- Type: Bay
- Etymology: Richard Kempenfelt
- Max. length: 14.5 kilometres (9.0 mi)
- Max. depth: 41.5 metres (136 ft)
- Settlements: Barrie

Kempenfelt Bay is a 14.5 km (9.0 mi) long bay that leads into the Canadian city of Barrie, Ontario. It is as deep as 41.5 m (136 ft) in places, and is connected to the larger Lake Simcoe. It is known for its ice fishing and legends of Kempenfelt Kelly, a Loch Ness monster style prehistoric creature. Kempenfelt Bay is home each year to Kempenfest, an outdoor arts and crafts festival.

== History ==
Iroquoian peoples began migrating to the Simcoe County area by the late 13th century. Early Ontario Iroquoian sites in the area which have been identified by archaeologists tend to be situated near bodies of water, and at least six lie adjacent to Kempenfelt Bay or lie closely to its west. In particular, a number of these sites are in a low-lying area near the Minesing Wetlands, which drained into the bay. This area was not very suitable for the growing of crops, but instead provided opportunities for hunting and fishing. Excavated faunal remains from settlements show a predominance of fish, with evidence of intensive fishing activity. In particular, the Steven Patrick site (Borden BcGw-70) had the remains of numerous different fish and animal species, including salmon, perch, catfish, walleye, beaver, raccoon, bear, and dog.

The bay was named by John Graves Simcoe, the Lieutenant-Governor of Upper Canada, after Rear-Admiral Richard Kempenfelt, Royal Navy, who had served as a captain in the West Indies during the 1740s, at which time and place Lieutenant-Governor Simcoe's father Captain John Simcoe, also served.

== Ice fishing ==
Ice fishing on Lake Simcoe begins in January and lasts until mid-March. Kempenfelt Bay usually freezes later in winter than the shallower sections of Lake Simcoe, such as Cook's Bay. There may be as many as 4000 huts during peak season, which must all be registered with the Ministry of Natural Resources. Yellow perch is the most commonly caught fish. Ice fishing on Lake Simcoe puts more than $28 million annually into the local economy.
