= Penville, Ontario =

- Dispersed rural community
- Location within Ontario Location within Canada
- Coordinates: 44°3′20″N 79°42′47″W
- Country: Canada
- Province: Ontario
- County: Simcoe
- Township: New Tecumseth
- Time zone: UTC-5 (Eastern (EST))
  - Summer (DST): UTC-4 (EDT)
- GNBC Code: FDLTP

Penville is a dispersed rural community in New Tecumseth, Simcoe County, Ontario, Canada.

== History ==
Penville was settled in 1832 by the Ausman, Dale, and Penfield families, immigrants from Scotland who cleared the land for farming.

A municipal government was established in Tecumseth Township in 1842, and Penville was the largest village in the township. The early settlement had three taverns and five stores. Black’s Methodist Church was erected in 1850, and a cemetery was established in 1858. That same year, a town hall was built. Penville had a large annual fair, described as having "about eleven entries of fall wheat, ten of spring, and 12 span of working horses that equalled any show in Toronto". A post office opened in 1854. By 1871, the population had grown to 130.

=== Decline ===
Penville declined following the construction of the Hamilton and North-Western Railway in 1877, which bypassed Penville in favour of nearby Beeton. Residents began leaving Penville, and by 1900, the settlement was "all but abandoned". The post office closed in 1914.

During the 1950s, the church building—which "hadn't had services in decades" and was being used as a granary—was demolished. The cemetery had 18 recorded interments, the last in 1933. A commemorative plaque describing the history of Penville is located there.

Several newer homes are now located in Penville.
