= Hamilton and Lake Erie Railway =

Shortline railway in Ontario, Canada

Overview
- Headquarters: Hamilton, Ontario
- Reporting mark: H&LE
- Locale: Southern Ontario, Hamilton
- Dates of operation: 1873–
- Successor: H&NW, GTR, CNR, SOR

Technical
- Track gauge: 4 ft 8 1/2 in (1,435 mm) standard gauge

The Hamilton and Lake Erie Railway (H&LE) is a historical shortline railway in Ontario, Canada. It ran from Hamilton to Port Dover, about 40 miles (64 km), providing trans-shipping service between Lake Erie and Lake Ontario, and with connections, to Lake Huron at Georgian Bay.

Formed in 1834 as the Hamilton and Port Dover Railway, it rechartered in 1853 and purchased the Hamilton and Southwestern Railway in 1855. Nothing came of any of these companies. When the charter was renewed in December 1869, it was purchased by the newly formed H&LE. Construction began in 1873, but the $1 million cost of driving up the 330 foot (100 m) Hamilton Mountain (part of the Niagara Escarpment at Hamilton) and building a bridge at the Grand River at Caledonia was too much too bear. The company ran out of cash after reaching Jarvis in January 1875, only a few miles short of Port Dover.

The company was purchased by the well-financed Hamilton and North-Western Railway (H&NW) in 1877. Through this merger, the H&NW controlled a network that connected Lake Erie, Ontario, Simcoe and Huron. The line was finally completed to Port Dover the next year. In 1881, the Grand Trunk Railway purchased both the H&NW and the competing Port Dover and Lake Huron Railway. The operations were merged over the next several years with a new station being built in GT style.

GT's 1918 bankruptcy and subsequent formation of the Canadian National Railway (CNR) in 1923 led to the line becoming part of the Hagersville Subdivision. CN lifted the line between Jarvis and Port Dover in 1935. In 1969 they constructed a new line running to the Nanticoke industrial area on Lake Erie. The remaining spur from Garnet to Jarvis was lifted in the 1970s. The Southern Ontario Railway purchased several lines in the area in 1997, forming an extended route from Brantford to Nanticoke as their newly reformed Hagersville Sub. The section from Hamilton to Caledonia, including the run up Hamilton Mountain, was abandoned in 1997 as part of this purchase. Of the original line, only the 15.6 miles (25.1 km) section from Caledonia to Garnet remains in use.

== History ==
Through the early 19th century, Toronto and Hamilton were locked in a battle to become Ontario's primary industrial center. With most of the banking power of the province located in Toronto, that city continued to win new businesses, especially railway lines, and by the 1850s began to dominate shipping in the province. Looking to address this problem, businessmen in Hamilton began planning a network of new rail lines that would provide more convenient shipping than Toronto due to their location at the very western tip of Lake Ontario.

On 22 April 1853, the Hamilton and Port Dover Railway was created to connect the two cities, providing transshipment between Lake Erie and Lake Ontario, as well as connections to the Great Western Railway for shipment east and west. Two years later, it purchased the assets of the moribund Hamilton and Southwestern Railway, which had been chartered in 1834 but never raised capital for construction. The H&PD did no better than the H&SW in fundraising and no construction was carried out.

After 15 years the charter came up for renewal, and on 24 December 1869 a new company was charted to buy the rights of the H&PD. The new Hamilton and Lake Erie Railway (H&LER) was more successful in fundraising, and finally began construction of the route in 1873. This was, unfortunately, also the year the Panic of 1873 which started the Long Depression, making further fundraising extremely difficult. By January 1875 the line was complete for 31 miles (50 km) to Jarvis, only 9 miles (14 km) short of its goal in Port Dover. However, the $1 million cost of running the line up Mount Hamilton (part of the Niagara Escarpment) and building a bridge across the Grand River at Caledonia had eaten up the company's funding, and further construction was abandoned.

On 5 August 1877 the company was purchased by the Hamilton and North-Western Railway (H&NW), who were in the process of completing the last leg of their route to Collingwood. Through the purchase, the H&NW now had a route that connected Lake Erie, Ontario and Georgian Bay on Lake Huron. They began surveying the final section south of Jarvis in May, finally reaching Port Dover in June 1878. By this time, the Port Dover and Lake Huron Railway (PD&LH), chartered in 1875, had already reached the town in 1875 and had subsequently built up an extensive dockyard area on the west side of the Lynn River that precluded further construction on the shore. (Note: Brown 2011 states they reached town in 1875.) Instead, the H&NW built the terminal slightly up the Lynn River. In June 1879, the H&NW merged with its former nemesis, the Northern Railway of Canada, and began consolidating its routes. They arranged an agreement with the PD&LH to share the docks and grain silo downtown, and built a bridge over the Lynn.

In 1887, the entire group of lines was purchased by the rapidly expanding Grand Trunk Railway (GTR), completing the takeover on 24 January 1888. As part of the GTRs bankruptcy in 1918, the lines eventually became part of the Canadian National Railway on 31 January 1923. The portion from Jarvis to Port Dover was abandoned on 13 July in 1935 and lifted shortly thereafter, along with the bridge over the Lynn River, as the company also controlled the PD&LH's more convenient route into town. The last passenger train to Port Dover ran in 1957. In 1969, CNR constructed a new branch line south from Garnet into the newly built industrial area at Nanticoke, leaving the short section between Garnet and Jarvis as a spur. The spur was lifted some time in the 1970s.

Many of the lines in the area were purchased by the Southern Ontario Railway in 1997. As part of the purchase, they reorganized the route to run primarily on the Buffalo, Brantford and Goderich Railway, which crossed the H&LE at Caledonia, and this became the main route for shipments ultimately going to Nanticoke. The section from Hamilton to Garnet was lifted that year. This leaves only the section from Caledonia to Garnet in use today, part of the reorganized Hagersville Subdivision.

== Route ==
From the Ontario Railway Map Collection, unless otherwise noted.

Starting in Hamilton, the H&LE starts at the dockyard areas in what is today known as Industrial Sector A. The line ran for a short distance in the dockyards before starting to run southwest parallel Ferguson Avenue. The first station was on Ferguson at Main Street. A short distance beyond the station the line bends 90 degrees to run southeastward upward along the edge of the Niagara Escarpment. It runs about 2.7 miles (4.3 km) to the area near modern Kenilworth Avenue, where it turned southwest again, now on top of Hamilton Mountain. After another 2.75 miles (4.43 km) was Rymal station.

From Rymal the line runs almost perfectly straight to Caledonia, bending slightly westward to meet the Buffalo, Brantford and Goderich in a large wye on the southeast side of town. It follows that line only a few hundred meters before bending southwest again to cross the Grand River, running almost straight to Hagersville and then Jarvis where it bends westward for a short distance before returning to its original route for the final run to Port Dover. It turns only slightly in Port Dover, running more westward into town, before turning sharply southward for its final approach to the dock area.

Principle stations on the route were Hamilton, Caledonia, Hagersville, Jarvis and Port Dover. Smaller stations were located in Rymal, Glanford and Garnet. Three of these stations survive. Caledonia station, the third to be built in the town, remains in use as a Grand Trunk Railway Museum and various local offices. Jarvis station, built in 1906 taking over both the Canada Air Line Railway station and the original H&NW station, is now a commercial space. Garnet was moved and is now used as a storage shed.

Like many railways that were abandoned in the late 20th century, the eastern sections of the line are now used for rail trail use as the Escarpment Rail Trail, part of the Trans-Canada Trail. The western sections, abandoned much earlier, have largely disappeared under modern agricultural fields, while some sections form the basis for modern roads in Port Dover, like Donjon Road and Grand Street. Its final terminus in town is now a marina and any trace of the connection at Bridge Street is gone.

== See also ==
- List of Ontario railways
