= Hamilton and North-Western Railway =

Railway in Ontario, Canada

Overview
- Headquarters: Hamilton, Ontario
- Locale: Ontario, Canada
- Dates of operation: 1878–1990
- Successor: Northern and Northwestern Railway, Grand Trunk Railway, CNR

Technical
- Track gauge: 4 ft 8 1/2 in (1,435 mm) standard gauge

The Hamilton and North-Western Railway (H&NW) is a former railway in Ontario, Canada. It ran north from Hamilton on the western end of Lake Ontario to Collingwood on Georgian Bay and Barrie on Lake Simcoe. Through the purchase of the Hamilton and Lake Erie Railway, the route continued south from Hamilton to Port Dover on Lake Erie.

The H&NW was formed to compete with the Northern Railway of Canada, which ran from Toronto to Barrie and then onto Collingwood. Towns along the H&NW route put up bonuses for construction in the hopes that it would lead to lower prices. Construction began in 1874 but economic troubles delayed it for the next two years. Major construction began in 1876, officially reaching Barrie on 1 December 1877, and Collingwood in 1879. The entire line was officially opened in December 1879, although it had been operational for some time at that point.

In June 1879 the H&NW merged with its supposed competitor to become the Northern and North-Western Railway. Both railways saw their ultimate role as a connection between the Toronto area and the newly completely Canadian Pacific Railway (CPR) mainline across northern Ontario. Flush with cash from the merger, the new company built the Northern and Pacific Junction Railway to the CPR at North Bay in 1886. The value of this route made them a takeover target, and the entire network was purchased by the Grand Trunk Railway in 1888, eventually becoming part of the Canadian National Railway (CNR) in 1923.

With the CNR takeover, the railway now had two routes into Collingwood. The H&NW's Collingwood branch was considered sub-par and the subject of jokes, but it was not until 1955 that CNR finally received permission to stop daily service along it. The northern section from Collingwood to Creemore remained in freight service until 1960, and the section from Alliston to Beeton until 1990. The mainline from Hamilton to Barrie closed in sections during the 1980s. Short sections remain in use to this day, and a section in the middle is now part of the South Simcoe Railway.

== History ==
=== Southern Ontario railway race ===
Through the middle of the 19th century, the growing cities of Hamilton and Toronto were in a constant battle for resources in order to establish themselves as the industrial capital of Upper Canada. By 1860 it seemed that Toronto was winning this race; the Great Western Railway, Grand Trunk Railway and Ontario, Simcoe and Huron Railway all met at its waterfront.

There had been some work on a Hamilton and Port Dover Railway as early as 1834. The company did not officially charter until 1853, and another decade before construction started. The cost of driving the line up Hamilton Mountain forced the company into bankruptcy and they were taken over by the newly formed Hamilton and Lake Erie Railway (H&LE) in 1869. The H&LE reached Jarvis in 1873, and then stalled at this point only a short distance from their goal.

The Ontario, Simcoe and Huron, by this time known as the Northern Railway of Canada, had built up a lucrative route for shipping wood and grain, first from southern Lake Simcoe and later, Collingwood which offered connections to the upper Great Lakes. Customers along the line accused the company of price gouging and there was considerable demand for a second route.

=== Hamilton and North-Western ===
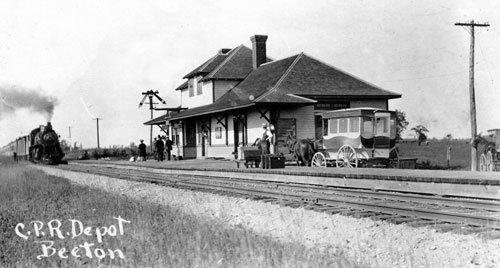
Beeton was a stop on the Hamilton and Northwestern Railway. The line split a short distance north of the station at Allimil, with the mainline running to Barrie and a branch-line to Collingwood.

In March 1872, the Hamilton and North-Western formed and announced their intention to build this second route, running from Hamilton to Barrie with a branch to Collingwood. Towns along the proposed routes gave up large bonuses to be selected as stops along the line. This included the city of Hamilton, which pledged $100,000 if the railway would run along Beach Strip, which they were developing as a recreational site.

The announcement caused the Northern to begin plans for their own expansions in the area, approaching the same towns with offers to build new lines. However, ill-will against the Northern was too strong, and by 1877 their plans to compete directly appear to have been abandoned. Some of the extensions planned during this period would be built, but they did not pass through the same route.

Construction of the line began in 1874, but was almost immediately stopped due to the Panic of 1873 and the ensuing Long Depression. Work continued in fits and starts over the next year. The line reached Milton on 13 November 1876 where it met the Toronto and Hamilton Railway (by this time, part of the Great Western Railway) and Georgetown later that year, where it met the Toronto, Grey and Bruce Railway (part of the Grand Trunk). It reached Beeton (then known as Clarksville) in October 1877, and Barrie on the last day of the year. (Note: There is speculation that the first train did not reach Barrie until the next day, but the opening date was "back dated" to meet promises that they would open "in 1877".)

Construction of the branch to Collingwood was completed in 1878, with a station built on Walnut Street. The lines continued for a short distance past the station to the Collingwood Milling Company on the lakeshore, and there were plans to extend this onto a wharf with a large grain silo to compete with the Northern's on the east end of town. The Collingwood line officially opened for business on 1 January 1879, and ran its official inspection train on 16 January.

In 1877, the H&NW bought and merged the operations of the H&LE. As part of the purchase, they completed the line to Port Dover in 1878. However, by this point the Port Dover and Lake Huron Railway (PD&LH) had built up most of the better spots in the port, so their line was forced to run on the east side of the Lynn River where they built a station. The two railways eventually came to an agreement to share the waterfront and the grain elevator and the H&NW built a bridge over the river to connect to the PD&LH. With the completion of the Collingwood and Port Dover portions in 1878, the network now provided a route that connected lakes Huron, Simcoe, Ontario and Erie.

In 1884, the Silverbrook Tramway chartered to build a short connection westward from Tioga station to a lumber mill.

=== Merger with Northern ===
In June 1879, to the great consternation of the cities that had put up bonuses, the H&NW accepted a bid from the Northern to merge their operations into the new Northern and Northwestern Railway (N&NW). The H&NW's station on Walnut was abandoned in favour of the Northern's on St. Paul Street to the east, and plans for their own wharf and silo were abandoned. The Northern was at that time a Provincial gauge line, and directly connecting the two in Collingwood was not possible. The Northern lines were switched to Standard gauge in sections during 1881.

In 1882 the Canadian Pacific Railway reached North Bay, about 250 kilometres (160 mi) north of Barrie. As the CP railhead began to approach North Bay, a new railway rush broke out to connect the CP line to Toronto. The Northern was an obvious choice as a starting point as by this time they had constructed an extension to Bracebridge, Ontario and had most of the good routes west of Lake Simcoe locked up. The merger with the H&NW provided the capital and cashflow needed to build the remaining section, the Northern and Pacific Junction Railway, which reached North Bay in 1886.

The next year, the rapidly expanding Grand Trunk purchased a controlling interest in the N&NW, and completed the takeover on 24 January 1888. This formed the basis of the company's Toronto-area network, and was soon joined by new east–west lines to compete with the CP.

=== Closure ===
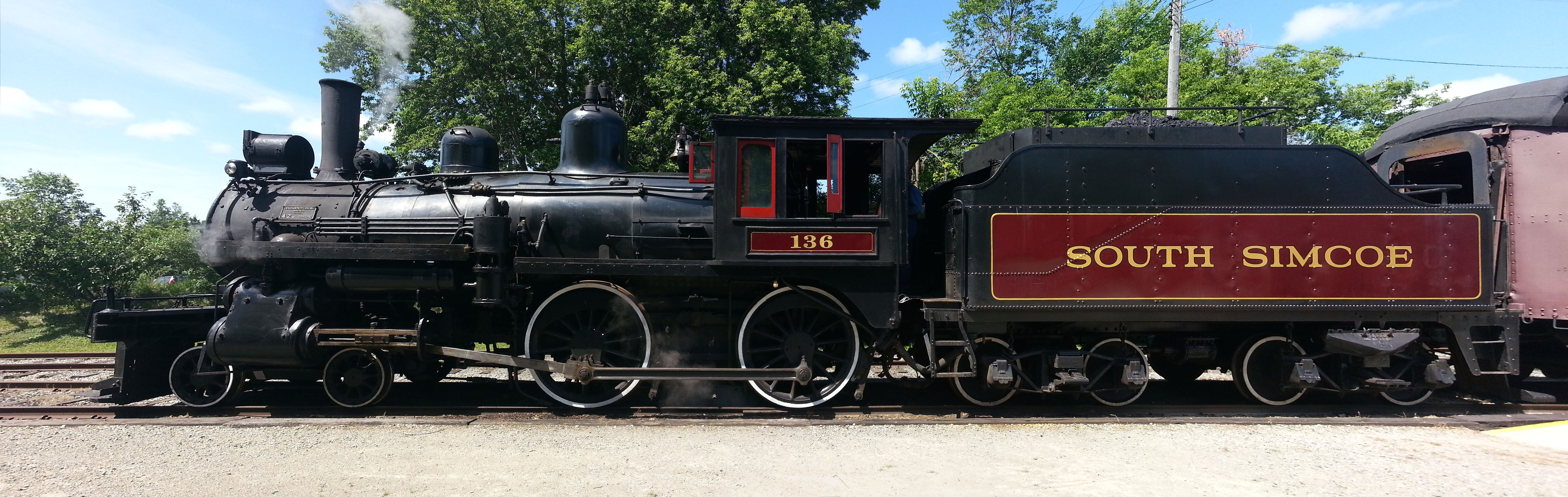
Locomotive #136 of the South Simcoe Railway, a heritage railway which runs over a portion of the former H&NW between Tottenham and Beeton.

As part of the Grand Trunk's 1918 bankruptcy, the line eventually became part of the Canadian National Railway in 1923. Service along the H&NW route was reduced from two to one trains a day, and in 1930 the passenger stations at Duntroon and Glen Huron were closed. During the following years, the section from Beeton to Collingwood became the Alliston Subdivision, while the mainline from Hamilton to Barrie became the Milton Subdivision.

In 1955, CNR received permission to stop daily service on the Alliston Subdivision. By this time it was the subject of jokes about its poor construction. The rails were very lightweight at 56 pound/yard, and it was said the contractor saved money by backfilling with trees which then rotted and left the line in very rough condition. A joke was that speed was limited to 60 mph - 20 forward, 20 side-to-side, and 20 up-and-down.

The last daily train on the Alliston Subdivision ran on 29 October 1955. In April 1956 the line between Alliston and Creemore was lifted, leaving the main line into Barrie complete, along with what amounted to spurs from Collingwood to Creemore and Beeton and Alliston. The northern section in Collingwood became part of the Meaford Subdivision, the CNR name for the original Northern route into town, while the southern section became part of the Milton Subdivision.

The northern section was used only briefly until April 1960, mostly between Collingwood and Glen Huron for the Hamilton Brothers lumber yard. The condition of the tracks deteriorated to the point where speeds were limited to 5 to 10 miles per hour (8.0–16.1 km/h). Still largely powered by steam at this point, this spur presented a problem because there was no way to turn around south of Collingwood. Trains to Creemore or Glen Huron had to back all the way to Collingwood where the railway turntable remained in use. Between August 1955 and January 1957, a 4-6-4 "Baltic" tank engine was used for this service as it eliminated the tender which made operations somewhat simpler.

On 28 October 1963, as part of a reorganization, the section of the Milton Subdivision north of Georgetown became known as the Beeton Subdivision, and then again one year became part of the Halton Subdivision. On 27 January 1975, CNR received permission to abandon the section between Georgetown and Cheltenham, a little less than 10 miles (16 km). On 22 June 1984, they received permission to abandon the section from Cheltenham to Beeton. The remaining line from Beeton to Barrie became the Beeton Spur on 3 March 1988, part of the Newmarket Subdivision. On 15 August 1989 they received permission to abandon the remaining section on 1 January 1990.

When the CNR received permission to abandon the section from Cheltenham to Beeton, the section north of Tottenham to Beeton was purchased by what is today the South Simcoe Railway. They run heritage steam trains on this short section. The section between Burlington and Georgetown is today part of CN's busy Halton Subdivision, while the section from Georgetown to Tottenham is a rail trail, which is part of the Trans-Canada Trail.

== Route ==
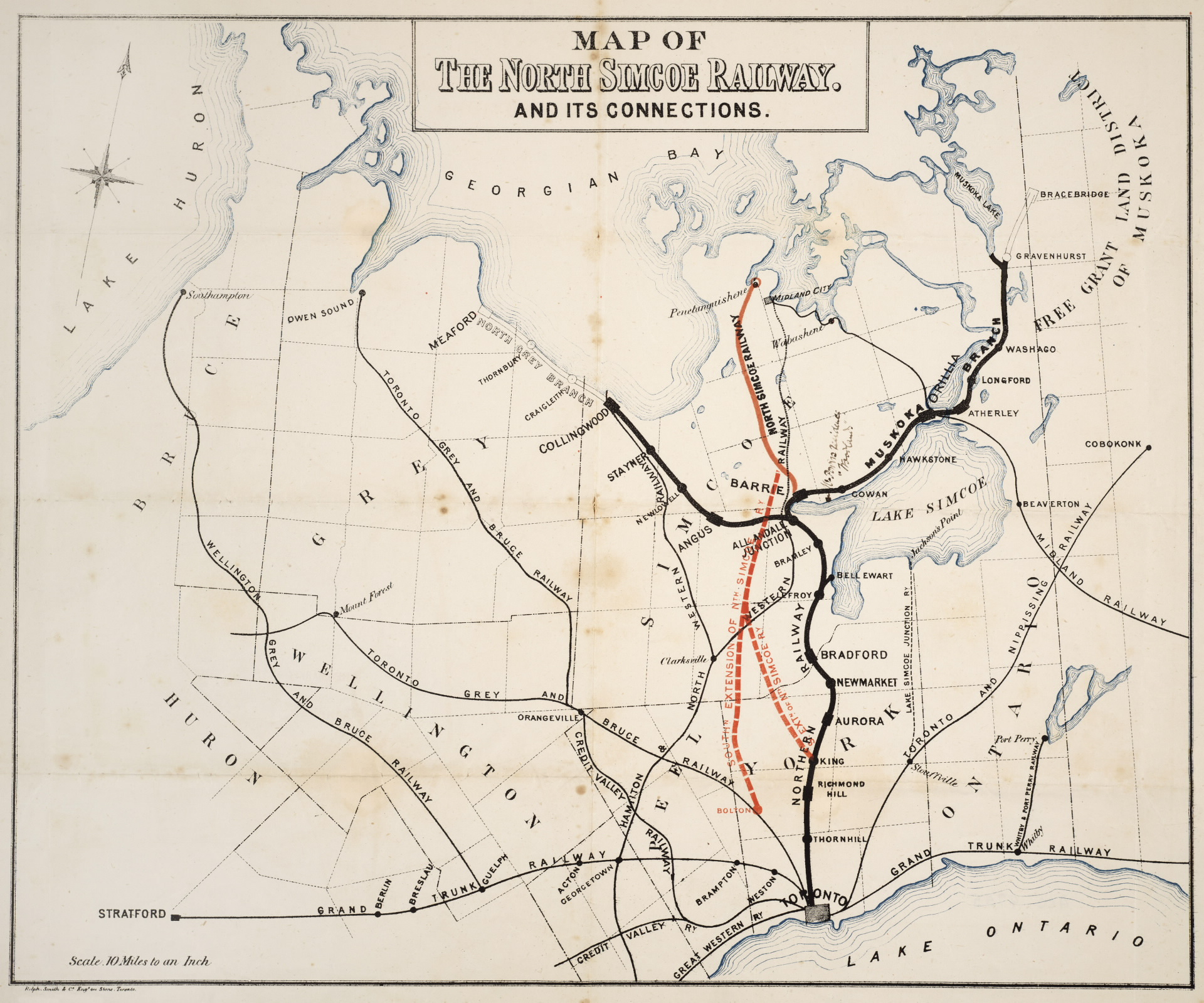
When the H&NW was announced, the Northern announced several expansions to compete with it, shown on this map. The H&NW can be seen just to the left of the red lines. It shows a never-built extension to Midland, and the route to Collingwood was built further west than shown here.

From the Ontario Railway Map Collection, unless otherwise noted.

The original H&NW route starts near the shore of Lake Ontario in Hamilton where it wyed off the Great Western Railway just east of Ferguson Avenue, about 2 kilometres (1.2 mi) east of the original train station on the banks of Hamilton Harbour. A second wye about a block east of the split connected it the Hamilton and Lake Erie, which ran south through town. The line continued eastward, parallel to the Great Western, for about 5 kilometres (3.1 mi) to the Dofasco plant. This section remains in use as industrial spurs.

Just east of Dofasco it turned to the northeast and then followed a long curve near Woodward Avenue that turned it to the northwest along the spit across the entrance of Hamilton Harbour. From here it runs northwest along the beach across the entrance of the harbour beside today's Burlington Skyway. The Burlington Canal Lift Bridge over the Burlington Bay Canal into the harbour, built for the line in 1962, has since been reused for the local road Eastport Drive and the Breezeway Trail recreational trail. A second branch met the line where it ran onto the beach, leading southeast to meet the Great Western at Stoney Creek station, forming a huge wye out of the Hamilton lines with its northern apex on the beach.

The line continues northwest into Burlington, turning slightly westward to meet the Hamilton and Toronto Railway (Grand Trunk) at Burlington Junction. From there it turns northeast for a short distance before curving to the northwest again near Appleby Line. The line runs through Milton, jogging for a short distance to the northeast in the middle of town, before leaving town heading northwest again. It bends northward to Georgetown where it crosses the Toronto and Guelph Railway (also Grand Trunk). A switch north of town connects to a short line running eastward to large wye that connects to the Toronto and Guelph at the switchyard in town; this section was originally constructed by the Toronto and Guelph in 1854 to service a quarry north of town. The mainline continues roughly northward out of Georgetown to Inglewood station, turns north-northeast through Palgrave, then north again through Tottenham and into Beeton. Just north of Beeton, at Allmil, the line spits.

The mainline to Barrie runs northeast out of Allmil to Cookstown and then northward through Thornton. On the far side of town, it makes a sharp turn to the east, running east-northeast under Ontario Highway 400 and then turns sharply again to run northward into southern Barrie. Just south of Yonge Street (formerly Ontario Highway 11) it turned westward to run just south of Burton Avenue and then north along the west side of Bradford Street, looping around Kempenfelt Bay to end in a station at Sophia Street. After the merger with the Northern, the Sophia station was abandoned and the line was extended across Yonge Street to join the Northern close to the Allandale Station.

The Collingwood spur runs northwest from Allmil through Alliston and on to Everett where it begins a more northerly route to Tioga. Here it meets the Silverbrook Tramway. It continues north-northwest to Glencairn, then northwest through Creemore where it turns westward around some high hills. North of Websterville i turns north again, passing through Smithdale where Glen Huron station was situated, then northwest again past Duntroon, Nottawa and finally into Collingwood along Walnut Street. The line met the Northern again on the North Grey Railway line, just north of First Street. The total distance of this portion was officially 40.02 miles (64.41 km).

Various sections of the former H&NW remain in use. A short section outside Allandale Station in Barrie south to Innisfil Heights is now part of the Barrie Collingwood Railway. The other end of the line, the section between Georgetown and Burlington, is part of the CN Halton Subdivision. It provides a crossover route from what was formerly the Hamilton and Toronto along the lakeshore, and the Grand Trunk Railway running to Guelph further north.

== See also ==
- List of Ontario railways
