= St. Thomas Aquinas Catholic Secondary School (Tottenham) =

High school in Ontario, Canada

Coordinates: 44.0354°N 79.8083°W

Saint Thomas Aquinas

Location
- 2 Nolan street, Tottenham, ON L0G 1W0

Information
- Type: High school
- Religious affiliation: Catholic
- Patron saint: Saint Thomas Aquinas
- Established: 1983
- Principal: Arlene Merkley
- Enrolment: 875 (2023–24)
- Website: http://sts.schools.smcdsb.on.ca/

Saint Thomas Aquinas is a Catholic secondary school educating grades 9–12, located in Tottenham, Ontario, Canada. It is part of the Simcoe Muskoka Catholic District School Board. The school is named after Saint Thomas Aquinas, who is the patron saint of universities, Catholic schools and students. The school participates in county sporting events under the name of the "Stingers". The school was founded in 1969. The principal is Arlene Merkley. The school has an enrolment of about 875 students.

The high school serves students from New Tecumseth, Adjala–Tosorontio, Southern Essa Township and a portion of Bradford West Gwillimbury.

== See also ==
- Education in Ontario
- List of secondary schools in Ontario
