= New Tecumseth =

- Town (lower-tier)
- Town of New Tecumseth
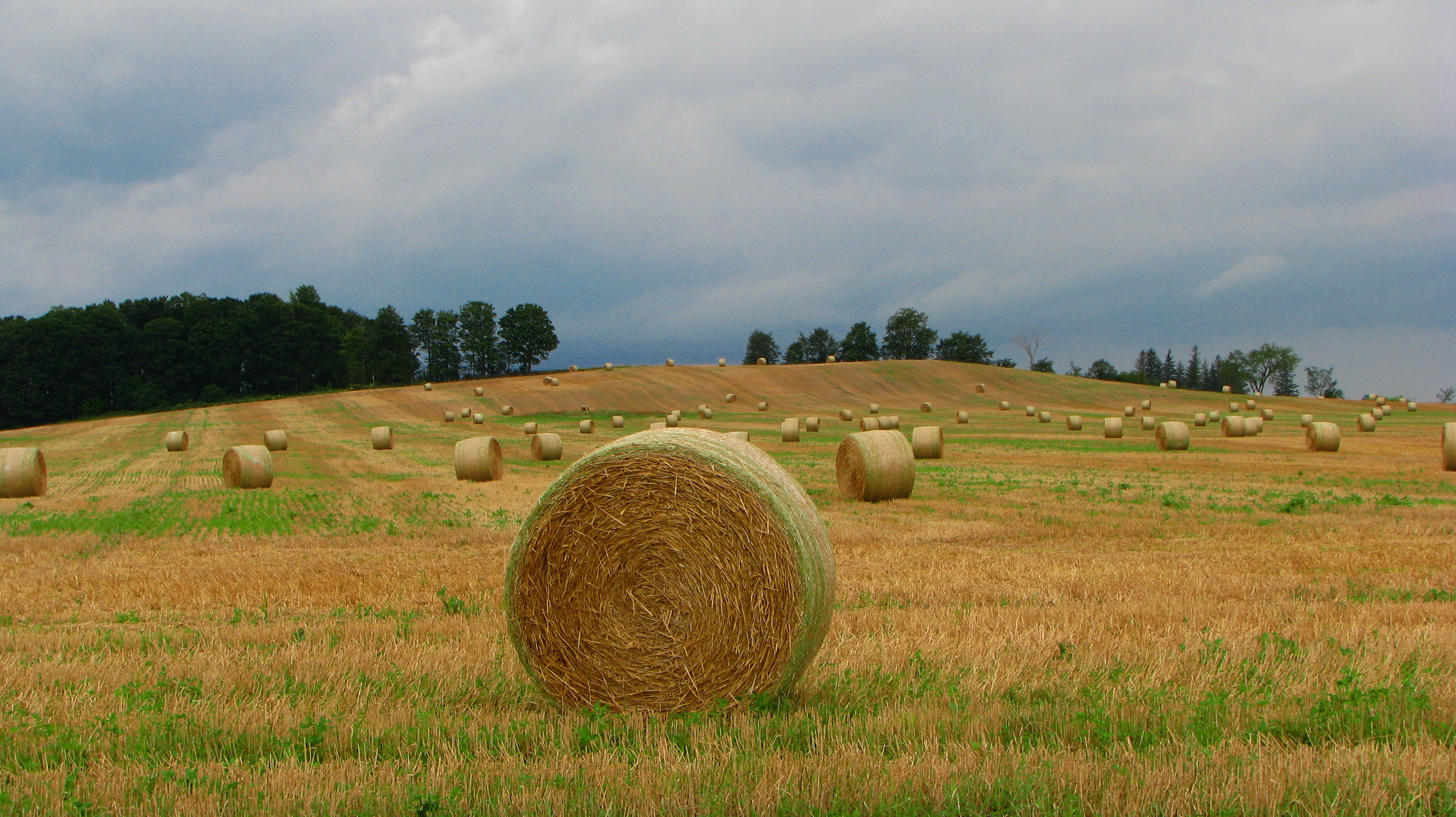
- Straw bales near Alliston

- Location within Simcoe County Location within Southern Ontario
- Coordinates: 44°05′05″N 79°45′56″W
- Country: Canada
- Province: Ontario
- County: Simcoe
- Settled: ca. 1820
- Incorporated: January 1, 1991

Government
  - Mayor: Richard Norcross
  - MP: Scot Davidson
  - MPP: Brian Saunderson

Area
  - Land: 273.87 km^{2} (105.74 sq mi)

Population (2021)
  - Total: 43,948
  - Density: 160.5/km^{2} (416/sq mi)
- Time zone: UTC-5 (Eastern (EST))
  - Summer (DST): UTC-4 (EDT)
- Postal code FSA: L9R, L0G
- Area codes: 705, 289, 905
- Website: newtecumseth.ca

New Tecumseth is a town in Simcoe County, in south-central Ontario, Canada. While it is not officially a part of the Greater Toronto Area, it is counted, in terms of the census, as being a part of the Toronto Census Metropolitan Area.

== History ==
The municipality was created on January 1, 1991, through the amalgamation of the Town of Alliston (incorporated 18 June 1874), the Villages of Beeton and Tottenham (both incorporated 18 June 1884), and the Township of Tecumseth (incorporated January 1, 1850). The name 'New Tecumseth' was chosen because a Town of Tecumseh already existed in Essex County.

The town hosted the Panama national football team during the 2026 FIFA World Cup, jointly hosted by Canada, the United States and Mexico.

== Communities ==
The main centres in New Tecumseth are the communities of Alliston, Tottenham, and Beeton.

The town also includes the smaller communities of Allimil, Green Briar, Nicolston, Penville, Randall, Rich Hill, Schomberg Heights and Thompsonville.

== Demographics ==
In the 2021 Census of Population conducted by Statistics Canada, New Tecumseth had a population of 43,948 living in 15,854 of its 16,249 total private dwellings, a change of 28.3% from its 2016 population of 34,242. With a land area of 273.87 km^{2} (105.74 sq mi), it had a population density of 160.5/km^{2} (415.6/sq mi) in 2021.

Canada census – New Tecumseth community profile

	2021	2016
Population	43,948 (+28.3% from 2016)	34,242 (+13.3% from 2011)
Land area	273.87 km^{2} (105.74 sq mi)	274.21 km^{2} (105.87 sq mi)
Population density	160.5/km^{2} (416/sq mi)	124.9/km^{2} (323/sq mi)
Median age	39.6 (M: 38.8, F: 40.4)	42.7 (M: 41.6, F: 43.8)
Private dwellings	16,249 (total) 15,854 (occupied)	13,191 (total)
Median household income	$104,000	$85,988

References: 2021 2016

Historical census populations – New Tecumseth
Year	Pop.	±%
1991	20,239	—
2001	26,141	+29.2%
2006	27,701	+6.0%
2011	30,234	+9.1%
2016	34,242	+13.3%
2021	43,948	+28.3%
Source: Statistics Canada

== Education ==
New Tecumseth has nine elementary schools and two area high schools:

- Alliston Union PS (Alliston)
- Banting Memorial High School (Alliston)
- Boyne River PS (Alliston)
- Ernest Cumberland ES (Alliston)
- FX O'Reilly Catholic School (Tottenham)
- Monsignor Ronan Catholic School (Beeton)
- St. James Catholic School (Tottenham)
- St. Paul's Catholic School (Alliston)
- St. Thomas Aquinas Catholic Secondary School (Tottenham)
- Tecumseth Beeton ES (Beeton)
- Tecumseth South Central PS (Tottenham)
- Tottenham PS (Tottenham)
- Alliston Community Christian School (Alliston)(Private)

Public schools are in the Simcoe County District School Board and Catholic with the Simcoe Muskoka Catholic District School Board.

== Notable persons ==
- Kate Aitken, influential cooking and homemaking expert, television and radio broadcaster, born in Beeton. A plaque was placed in Beeton Park in her honour.
- Dr Sir Frederick Banting, physician and scientist born in Alliston. Discovered insulin with his assistant, Charles Best.
- Sir William Osler, physician and professor of medicine was born in Bond Head (formerly in Tecumseth and now part of Bradford West Gwillimbury). He has been called 'the Father of Modern Medicine'.
- Deanne Rose, Olympic medal-winning soccer player was born in New Tecumseth.
- Jim Rutherford, retired NHL goaltender and Stanley-Cup-winning General Manager was born in Beeton.
- Harvey Sproule, NHL club part owner, NHL St. Patrick’s Head Coach, OHA and NHL referee, Brier-level curler, international-level horse racing owner and broadcaster, Toronto Star sports writer born in New Tecumseth

== See also ==
- List of townships in Ontario
