= Lynn Valley Trail =

Nature trail in Norfolk County, Ontario

Coordinates: 42.814229°N 80.272551°W

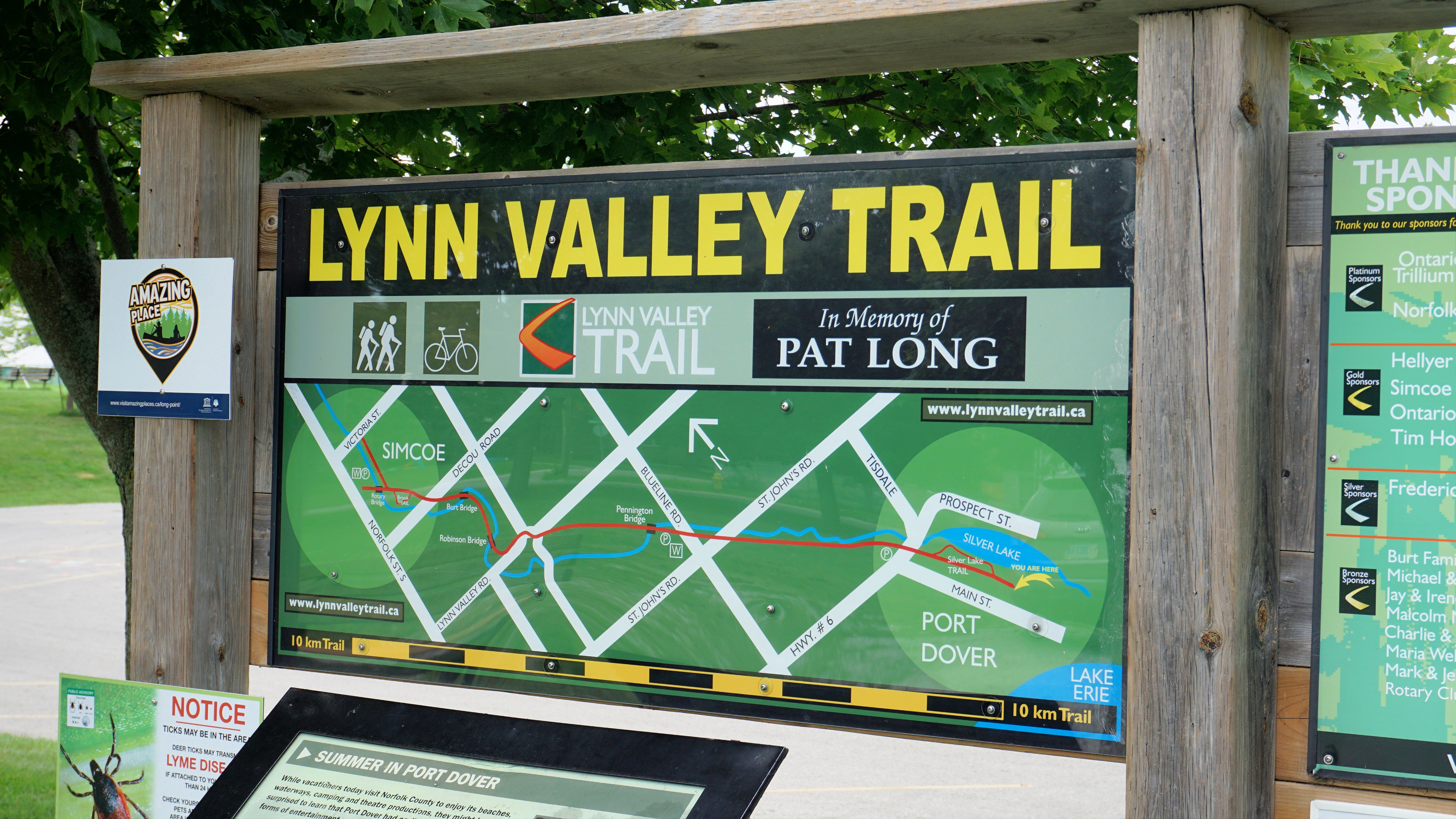
Lynn Valley Trail

The Lynn Valley Trail is a 10-kilometre (6.2 mi) trail connecting Simcoe, Ontario, Canada to Port Dover.

== Summary ==
Both destinations are historic small towns with rustic central business areas. This trail meets with the Lynn River in certain places. It follows a former railbed through Carolinian forest. Edible things to eat found along the trail include wild strawberries, wild raspberries, and blackberries. Nighttime use of the trail is prohibited and only pedestrians and bicycles may use the trail at any time. Privacy laws prevent the climbing of fences and gates leading to private property as a part of respecting the residents that live along the trail.

Farm animals are not to be disturbed if found in or around the trail as they are considered a part of the farmer's private property.

Considered to be an easy trail, the Lynn Valley Trail is 8 kilometres long and can be used year-round. Recommended activities include cross-country skiing, cycling, walking, and hiking. Running is not recommended because of the number of people using the trail on a daily basis. The trail is made of compacted soil and is surrounded by forests. Mosquito repellent is recommended between the months of June and October.

At least 77 species of birds have been discovered here between 2015 and 2019; including the Rose-breasted Grosbeak, the Yellow Warbler, and the Red-winged Blackbird.

== See also ==
- List of trails in Canada
