= Tottenham Bluegrass Festival =

Music festival in Canada

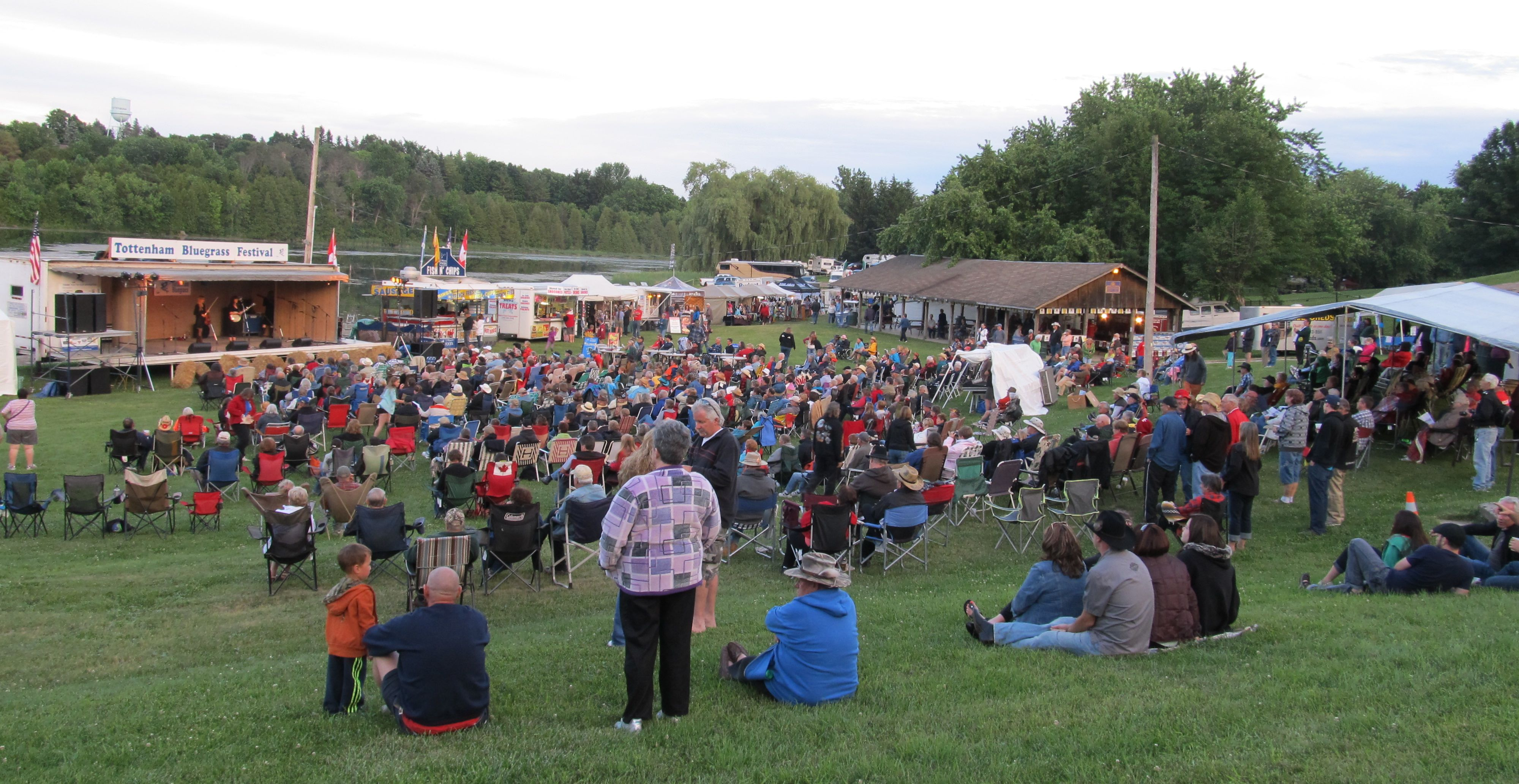
- Bluegrass fans in the concert area at the 2014 Tottenham Bluegrass Festival
- Genre: Bluegrass music
- Locations: Tottenham, Ontario
- Years active: 1983-present
- Website: Official website

The Tottenham Bluegrass Festival is an annual event which has been held in the community of Tottenham, Ontario since 1983.

The Tottenham Bluegrass Festival presents a three-day stage show featuring well-known bluegrass bands from around Canada and the United States.

In addition to the main stage entertainment, the festival also includes a children's talent show, instrument-specific workshops, new band showcases, an artisan's village, a barbeque supper, and campfire picking.

Contributing to the 30-year success of this festival is its location, the Tottenham Conservation Area, with shady camping for hundreds of trailers and tents and a natural amphitheatre overlooking a small lake.

== Gallery ==
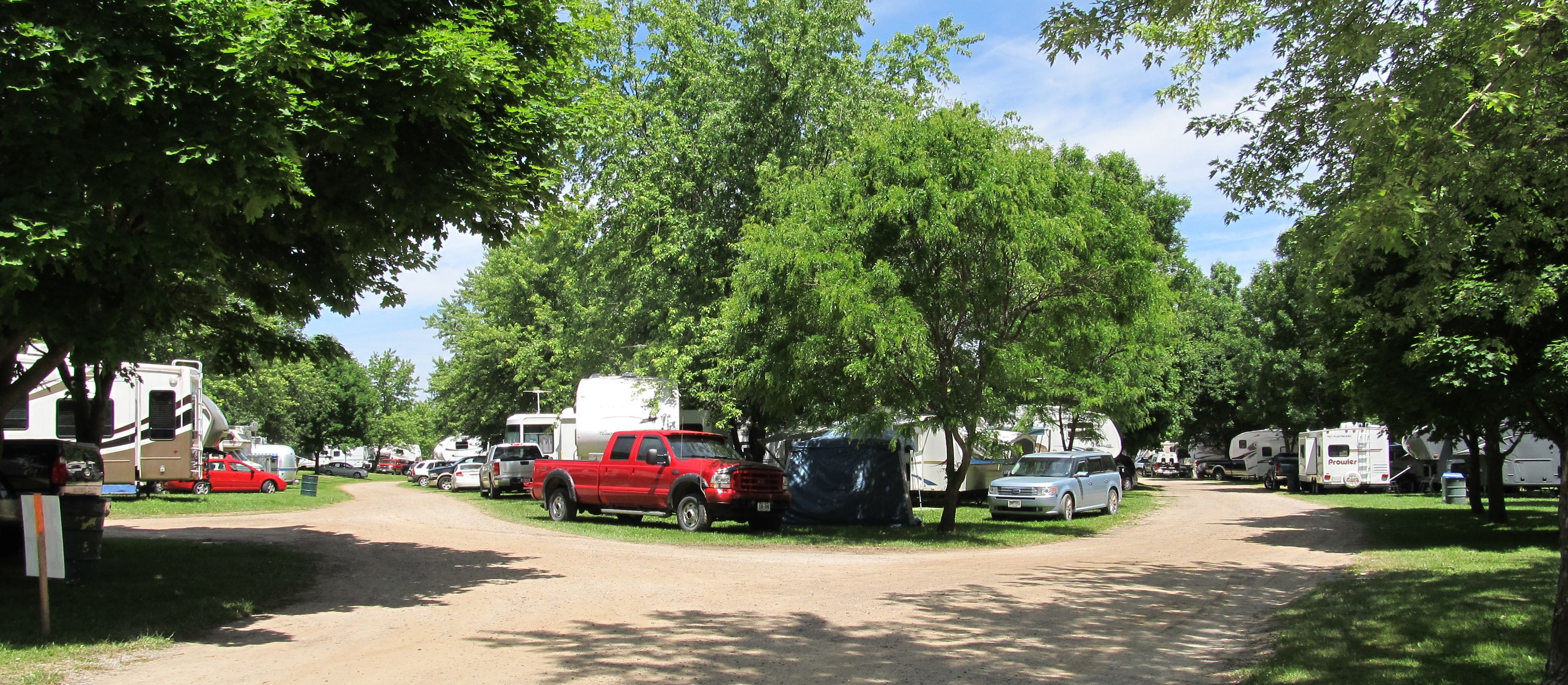
Camping in the Tottenham Conservation Area

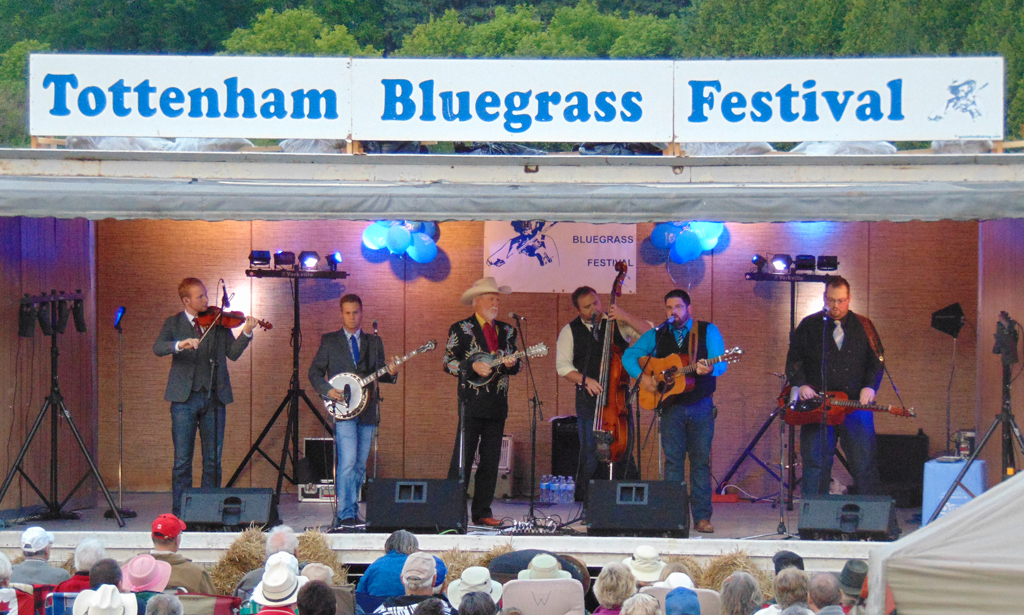
Doyle Lawson & Quicksilver on stage at the 2015 Tottenham Bluegrass Festival in Ontario, Canada

== See also ==
- List of bluegrass music festivals
- List of country music festivals
