= Alliston =

- Unincorporated community
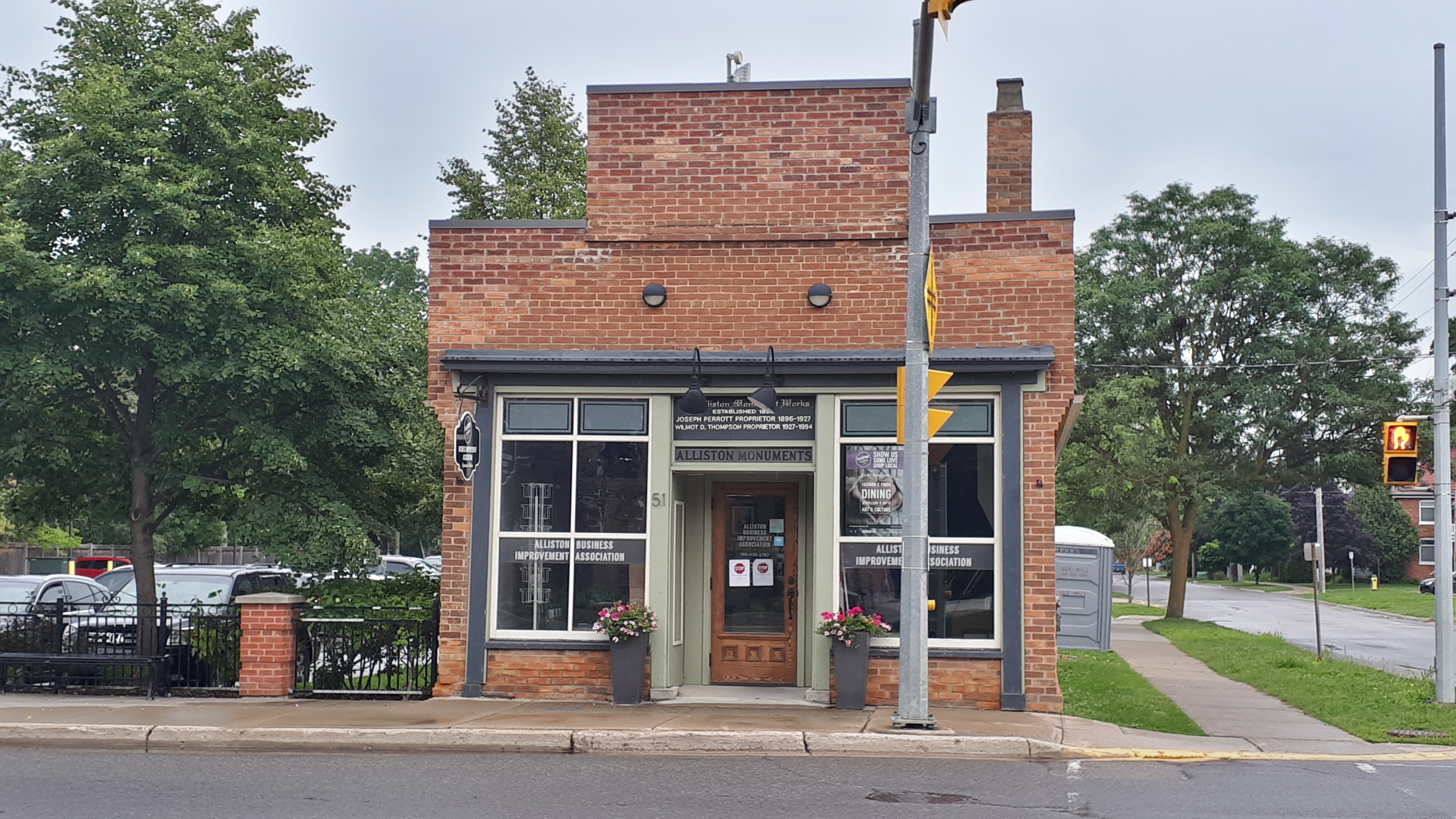

- Location within Simcoe County Location within Southern Ontario
- Coordinates: 44°09′00″N 79°51′48″W
- Country: Canada
- Province: Ontario
- County: Simcoe
- Town: New Tecumseth
- Incorporated: 1874 (village), 1891 (town)
- Amalgamated: 1991

Government
  - Type: Unincorporated
  - MP: Terry Dowdall (Conservative)
  - MPP: Brian Saunderson (PC)

Area
  - Land: 18.78 km^{2} (7.25 sq mi)

Population (2021)
  - Total: 23,253
  - Density: 1,238/km^{2} (3,210/sq mi)
- Demonym: Allistonian
- Time zone: UTC-5 (Eastern Time Zone)
  - Summer (DST): UTC-4 (Eastern Time Zone)
- Postal code FSA: L9R
- Area codes: 705, 249
- Provincial highways: Highway 89
- County roads: County Road 10; County Road 15

Alliston is a settlement in Simcoe County in the Canadian province of Ontario. It has been part of the Town of New Tecumseth since the 1991 amalgamation of Alliston and nearby villages of Beeton, Tottenham, and the Township of New Tecumseth. The primary downtown area is located along Highway 89, known as Victoria Street.

The town grew as a commercial centre for the area farmers and was best known as a potato-growing area. It is still a major industry in the town and is celebrated by the annual Alliston Potato Festival. Honda of Canada Manufacturing operates a large auto manufacturing facility southeast of Alliston, currently consisting of three major factories.

== History ==
Alliston traces its history to three brothers, William, John and Dickson Fletcher. Dissatisfied with life in England, the three left for Toronto, working farms in Toronto Gore northwest of the city. In 1821 William purchased Lot 15, Concession 3, Tecumseth Township. He married in 1828, and in 1847 went scouting locations for the construction of a mill with his son John. They chose a location at Lot 1, Concession 1, Essa Township, at the corner where four of the original townships of southern Simcoe County (Adjala, Tosorontio, Essa, and Tecumseth) meet. In early November they built a cabin on the property, and the rest of the family joined them in April the next year. A larger house, known as Fletcher House, was built in 1849, and still stands at 18 Fletcher Crescent.

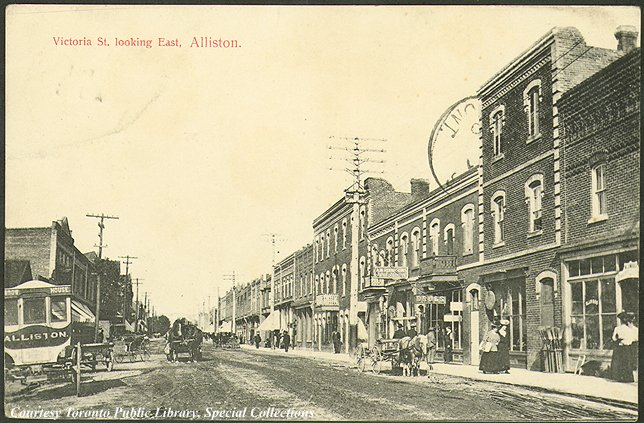
Alliston, 1910

In 1853 the Fletchers built a grist mill on the Boyne River, a tributary of the Nottawasaga River which runs to the east. The first child born in the new town was Margaret Grant, who was later mother to Frederick Banting. An Orange Lodge was built in 1856, and the next year the members decided to name the village as Alliston. The precise origin of the name remains in some doubt, but the most common story is that it was named for William Fletcher's birthplace, likely Allerston in North Yorkshire. A post office was set up the next year, with another Fletcher son, George, the first postmaster. Starting in 1862, George published "The Alliston Star" newspaper, which changed its name to "Alliston Herald" in 1871 and continues to be published today. The village was formally incorporated in 1874, with George Fletcher as the reeve.

In 1875, the town was approached by the North Simcoe Railway to run a line from Penetanguishene through Alliston to join the Toronto, Grey and Bruce Railway. This venture came to nothing, but the organization set up to investigate it later turned to the Hamilton and North-Western Railway to build a new arm from Clarkstown (now Beeton) through Alliston to Collingwood. The town raised $8000 for its portion of the railway from Clarkstown to Glencairn, about halfway to Collingwood.

Alliston was upgraded from "village" to "town" in 1891. On May 8 the same year a fire started in the stables of the Queen's Hotel, and was quickly spread by high winds. Collingwood was telegraphed for assistance and sent their fire engine by train, but the downtown area was gutted long before it could arrive. When it did arrive at about 3 in the afternoon, it was sent to the southern side of town where the fire was still burning. In all, 30 acres (120,000 m^{2}) of the town were destroyed by the fire, which received the attention of John A. Macdonald. This led to the creation of a waterworks the next year, which included twenty fire hydrants, and the addition of a hook and ladder truck in 1894.

A census in August 1902 stated that 1,475 people were living in the town. A new line of the Canadian Pacific Railway (C.P.R.) reached the town in 1905 or early 1906, with trains arriving later in 1906. The local electric power company, Alliston Electric, was merged into Ontario Hydro on May 24, 1918.

== Geography ==
The town has two parks: Riverdale Park to the north along the Boyne River and PPG Park to the south, by the local fire department. Major residential areas are located to the north (such as Previn Court Homes) and to the south, with additional residential and commercial developments made since then in the northwest (as "Alliston West"), north and southwest since the mid-1990s, with future developments expected in the future that could raise the population from 17,000 to 20,000. The urban area stretches from west to east, is nearly 5 km, and from north to south ranges from 300 m, 600 m to 3 km. Another residential area, adjacent to the Nottawasaga Inn are located 5 km east of Alliston- the first phase built is known as Green Briar; the second phase, to the west of the Inn is known as Briar Hill. The Nottawasaga River is situated east of the town; the Boyne River, which runs through Alliston, joins the Nottawasaga, just downstream from Nicolston Dam. The CPR (Toronto - Parry Sound - Sudbury) runs right up through the middle of town with a siding for Honda vehicles. Many other business thrive today in Alliston. Honda of Canada Manufacturing has two facilities. The CNR tracks through town were lifted about the mid-1990s and the right-of-way removed.

Earl Rowe Provincial Park is located three kilometers west of Alliston, in the amalgamated Township of Adjala-Tosorontio. It is one of the largest provincial parks in Southern Ontario.

=== Nearest communities ===
- Angus, north
- CFB Borden, North
- Egbert, northeast
- Cookstown, east
- Beeton, southeast
- Tottenham, south
- Hockley, southwest
- Everett, northwest
- Baxter, northeast

=== Climate ===
Climate data for Alliston (1981−2010)
Month	Jan	Feb	Mar	Apr	May	Jun	Jul	Aug	Sep	Oct	Nov	Dec	Year
Record high °C (°F)	15.5 (59.9)	15.5 (59.9)	24.5 (76.1)	30.5 (86.9)	34.5 (94.1)	35.5 (95.9)	36.5 (97.7)	37.0 (98.6)	35.0 (95.0)	30.5 (86.9)	22.5 (72.5)	20.0 (68.0)	37.0 (98.6)
Mean daily maximum °C (°F)	−2.5 (27.5)	−0.8 (30.6)	4.1 (39.4)	11.9 (53.4)	19.1 (66.4)	24.4 (75.9)	27.0 (80.6)	25.9 (78.6)	21.5 (70.7)	14.1 (57.4)	6.7 (44.1)	0.5 (32.9)	12.7 (54.9)
Daily mean °C (°F)	−6.5 (20.3)	−5.2 (22.6)	−0.7 (30.7)	6.7 (44.1)	13.1 (55.6)	18.4 (65.1)	21.0 (69.8)	20.0 (68.0)	15.9 (60.6)	9.2 (48.6)	3.1 (37.6)	−2.9 (26.8)	7.7 (45.9)
Mean daily minimum °C (°F)	−10.5 (13.1)	−9.6 (14.7)	−5.5 (22.1)	1.3 (34.3)	7.0 (44.6)	12.4 (54.3)	15.0 (59.0)	14.1 (57.4)	10.1 (50.2)	4.3 (39.7)	−0.5 (31.1)	−6.2 (20.8)	2.7 (36.9)
Record low °C (°F)	−35 (−31)	−34 (−29)	−28.5 (−19.3)	−12.5 (9.5)	−3 (27)	1.0 (33.8)	4.5 (40.1)	2.5 (36.5)	−3.5 (25.7)	−6 (21)	−19 (−2)	−32 (−26)	−35.0 (−31.0)
Average precipitation mm (inches)	53.9 (2.12)	49.5 (1.95)	53.8 (2.12)	63.6 (2.50)	78.3 (3.08)	81.0 (3.19)	77.6 (3.06)	82.3 (3.24)	80.1 (3.15)	71.3 (2.81)	81.6 (3.21)	61.3 (2.41)	834.4 (32.85)
Average rainfall mm (inches)	18.8 (0.74)	19.7 (0.78)	30.4 (1.20)	59.4 (2.34)	78.3 (3.08)	81.0 (3.19)	77.6 (3.06)	82.3 (3.24)	80.1 (3.15)	66.8 (2.63)	62.5 (2.46)	25.0 (0.98)	682.1 (26.85)
Average snowfall cm (inches)	35.1 (13.8)	29.7 (11.7)	23.4 (9.2)	4.1 (1.6)	0.0 (0.0)	0.0 (0.0)	0.0 (0.0)	0.0 (0.0)	0.0 (0.0)	4.5 (1.8)	19.1 (7.5)	36.3 (14.3)	152.3 (60.0)
Average precipitation days (≥ 0.2 mm)	16.7	11.7	12.0	12.5	12.3	10.8	10.9	11.5	12.0	13.7	15.0	15.5	154.6
Average rainy days (≥ 0.2 mm)	4.2	3.9	6.5	11.5	12.3	10.8	10.9	11.5	12.0	13.4	11.3	6.4	114.5
Average snowy days (≥ 0.2 cm)	13.6	9.2	6.7	1.8	0.0	0.0	0.0	0.0	0.0	0.73	5.0	10.4	47.3
Source: Environment Canada

== Demographics ==
- Population: 23,253 (2021 Census)
- Area: - 18.78 km^{2}
- Density: - 1238.3 per/km^{2}

== Government ==
The current mayor of New Tecumseth is Richard Norcross who won the chair position on October 24, 2022. Norcross is a former deputy mayor of New Tecumseth. Norcross decided to run for the mayor position in the fall of 2022 when former mayor Rick Milne announced he would not be seeking re-election.

MP for the federal riding of Simcoe—Grey is Terry Dowdall, elected in the 2019 Federal Election. The Member of Provincial Parliament for Simcoe—Grey is Jim Wilson, who was first elected in 1999.

Since the amalgamation of Alliston, Beeton and Tottenham under the Town of New Tecumseth, New Tecumseth Fire Rescue has 3 stations with a total force of 105 personnel. The Alliston Fire Station, now known as New Tecumseth Fire Station 1, was founded as the Alliston Fire Brigade in 1906 after many years of having a non-incorporated Fire Brigade.

== Economy ==
Honda of Canada Manufacturing has three plants producing vehicles and parts for the Americas. Plant 1 creating the new model Civic, Plant 2 creating the new model CRV and Plant 3 manufacturing engines for these and other plants in North America. Plant 1 opened in November 1986, with Plant 2 following 10 years later in 1998, and Plant 3 (Engine Plant) in 2008. The plants have a combined work force of 4,600 workers.

The Alliston Business Improvement Association was originally established in 1988 as a promotional campaign and management system in the revitalization of downtown Alliston. They have hosted many community events including food truck rallies, holiday events, as well as being a large part of the Potato Festival's organization.

== Health care ==
Stevenson Memorial Hospital first opened in 1928, when donations from Theodore Loblaw, of the famed Loblaws grocery chain, conceived the idea of a hospital as a tribute to his grandparents, William and Elizabeth Stevenson. This fully accredited hospital serves a catchment area that includes Adjala-Tosorontio, Canadian Forces Base Borden, Essa, Innisfil and New Tecumseth. The hospital works in close cooperation with Southlake Regional Health Centre in Newmarket.

== Notable people ==
- Margaret Atwood - lived on a farm near Alliston from 1973 to 1980
- Sir Frederick Banting - co-inventor of insulin; co-recipient of 1923 Nobel Prize in Physiology or Medicine. The town's only high school is named in his honour, Banting Memorial High School.
- Tyson Foerster - ice hockey player under contract of the Philadelphia Flyers of the NHL
- John Gould - ice hockey player who played 504 NHL games for the Atlanta Flames, Buffalo Sabres and the Vancouver Canucks.
- Larry Gould - ice hockey player who played 2 games for the Vancouver Canucks
- Owen Goodman - soccer player
- Ricardo Hoyos - Star of Sadie's Last Days on Earth and Degrassi
- William Erskine Knowles - member of the Legislative Assembly of Saskatchewan Commons
- Bryan Lewis - Politician; Director of Officiating for National Hockey League
- Theodore Loblaw - founder of Loblaws supermarkets
- George McCague - member of Legislative Assembly of Ontario
- George Wesley Norman - member of Legislative Assembly of Saskatchewan
- Deanne Rose - Olympic soccer player
- Harold Timmins - politician and jurist
- Joyce Trimmer - politician; retired to Alliston
- Jim Wilson - member of the Legislative Assembly of Ontario
- Susan Froud - a curler active on the World Curling Tour, she appeared in Scotties Tournament of Hearts in 2008, 2010, 2011 and 2013 and is a regular in the Ontario provincials.
- Stacey McGunnigle - comedienne and actress, appears on This Hour Has 22 Minutes

== Education ==
Alliston has three public elementary schools (Ernest Cumberland, Alliston Union and Boyne River) and three Catholic elementary schools (Holy Family, St. Paul's and St. Cecilia). There is also one public high school, Banting Memorial High School.
