= Beeton =

Coordinates: 44°05′03″N 79°47′09″W

- Unincorporated community
- Location within Ontario
- Country: Canada
- Province: Ontario
- County: Simcoe
- Town: New Tecumseth

Government
  - Councillor: Nicole Cox

Area
  - Land: 2.50 km^{2} (0.97 sq mi)

Population (2021)
  - Total: 4,151
  - Density: 1,659/km^{2} (4,300/sq mi)
- Demonym: Beetonian
- Time zone: UTC-5 (Eastern (EST))
  - Summer (DST): UTC-4 (EDT)

Beeton is a small community located in southern Simcoe County, Ontario, Canada between Tottenham and Alliston; all three were amalgamated in 1991 into the single Town of New Tecumseth. Beeton was named for a local apiary. Formerly known as Clarksville for Robert Clark, an early settler; the name changed to Beeton in 1878 with possible reference to David Allanson Jones, postmaster and Bee King of Canada.

== Demographics ==
- Population: 4,151 (2021 Census)
- Area: 2.50 km^{2}
- Population density: 1659.1 per/km^{2}

== Education ==
Beeton has one public elementary school (Tecumseth Beeton Elementary School) and one Catholic elementary school (Monsignor J.E Ronan Catholic School).

== Things to do ==
There is a lot of things to do in our lovely small town. Beeton is a very good place to walk, bike, and talk to friends.

== Railway ==
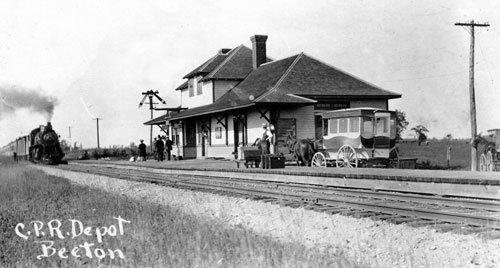
Beeton railway station c. 1910.

Beeton was a stop on the Hamilton and North-Western Railway. The railway split just north of the townsite, at a location then known as Allimil, running northeast through Cookstown to Barrie and northwest through Alliston to Collingwood. The line was later taken over by the Grand Trunk Railway, eventually turning into Canadian National Railways. Canadian Pacific Railway constructed a second line just to the west of town, and the CNR right-of-way was closed in the 1970s. The portion of the CNR railway running from Beeton south to Tottenham is now used for the South Simcoe Railway, a heritage railway.

== History ==
In the 1850s, blacksmith Robert Clark bought land and opened shops, and named the land Clarksville. The community became known for it's beekeeping through David Allanson Jones who was known as the "The Bee King of Canada." The Beeton Fall Fair hosted it's first Festival in 1856. The town was nicknamed "Bee Town" until the people adopted the name "Beeton" in the 1870s. In 1892, there was a massive fire, promoting brick construction leading to a formation called "Beeton Fire Brigade" in 1893. A place called "Miss Edgar's Muddy Water Hotel" was built not long after the fire. Some people believed to have seen a ghost near the Muddy Water Hotel. A retirement home in Beeton was opened by the county of Simcoe in 1898 as a house of refuge. Over time, the town evolved and started becoming more popular. In 1968, a public school opened, In 2002, a Catholic school opened. In 1991, New Tecumseth was almagated with Alliston, and Tottenham. In present time, Beeton has become more popular as a residential community. In 2018, Beeton opened a Condominium. Beeton has become very popular for the youth to hang out with friends, to have a good elementary school education and to bring people together!

== See also ==
- List of unincorporated communities in Ontario
