= South Simcoe Railway =

Heritage railway in Ontario, Canada

Coordinates: 44°01′22″N 79°48′29″W

- Locale: Ontario
- Terminus: Tottenham; Beeton

Commercial operations
- Original gauge: 4 ft 8 1/2 in (1,435 mm)

Preserved operations
- Stations: 1
- Length: 4.7 mi (7.6 km)
- Preserved gauge: 4 ft 8 1/2 in (1,435 mm)

Preservation history
- Headquarters: Tottenham, Ontario

Website
- southsimcoerailway.ca

The South Simcoe Railway is a steam heritage railway in Tottenham, Ontario, Canada. Founded in 1992, the railway operates scenic rail excursions in the Beeton Creek valley of southern Ontario. It is the oldest operating steam heritage railway in Ontario and has the second-oldest operating steam locomotive in Canada.

== Operations and rolling stock ==
Excursions last about 50 minutes over 4 miles (6.4 km) of track from Tottenham through the scenic Beeton Creek valley to Beeton and back. Although the trains stop in Beeton, passengers cannot disembark, as there is no station there. The railway has plans to add a Beeton station, but as is common with many heritage railways, this sort of project is highly dependent on fundraising.

The railway has two ex-Canadian Pacific steam locomotives, the best known being an 1883 Rogers Locomotive and Machine Works 4-4-0 A2m #136, which was used in the 1970s CBC television series The National Dream. #136 helped build the transcontinental railroad, the Canadian Pacific, across Canada in the 1880s. The railway also owns a 1912 Montreal Locomotive Works 4-6-0 D10h, ex-CPR #1057, and two road-capable diesel locomotives, (ex-Canadian Pacific Canadian Locomotive Company D-T-C #22 and ex-Norfolk Southern GE 70-ton diesel-electric #703). Rounding out the collection is a diesel-electric yard switcher locomotive, Ruston-Hornsby 165DE #10.

The excursion train is made up of restored 1920s era coaches, previously owned by the Canadian Pacific Railway, Canadian National Railway, Toronto, Hamilton and Buffalo Railway and the Louisville & Nashville Railroad. The railway's equipment collection also includes rolling stock not used on the excursions, including a former Ontario Northland Railway business car #200, a combination passenger/baggage coach used as a museum, two wooden cabooses, one steel wide-vision ex-CPR caboose, a ballast car, various boxcars, flat cars, and steam generator cars.

Regular excursions operate from the May long weekend through to the weekend after Thanksgiving. Excursions feature the conductor's commentary on the scenery, the history of the line, and the place of the railways in Canadian history. Special events during the year include the Easter Express, Halloween Adventure and the Santa Claus Express at Christmas, which have a holiday focus. The PBS series Shining Time Station was shot here and at Union Station in Toronto.

== Organization volunteers ==
The driving force behind the South Simcoe Railway was the Late Eric "Smitty" Smith, who was the organization's president, Operations Manager and Chief Mechanical Officer. He began his dedicated service to the South Simcoe Railway in 1991, before its public debut. For several decades, he oversaw all aspects of the operation of the railway and its volunteer members. Mr. Smith died in December of 2024.

The excursion trains are operated by volunteers who have taken their training regarding all aspects of railway operation, and qualified as flagmen, trainmen, conductors, firemen or locomotive engineers. All volunteers with operational qualifications haven written their Canadian Rail Operating Rules examination and GOI examination, and are required to regularly re-qualify.

Maintenance and restoration activities are also carried out by volunteers. This includes track, right-of-way, site and property maintenance, locomotive maintenance and repair, and coach maintenance, cleaning and repair.

Operational and restoration activities are managed and supervised by volunteer foremen, department managers and the board of directors; in all cases, these managers and directors are also active volunteers who take on roles in the day-to-day operation of the Railway.

== Restoration ==
Engine #136 was returned to service in August 2011 after extensive restoration work by the organization's volunteers. As of 2024, the South Simcoe Railway operates excursion trains behind diesel locomotive #703, with steam locomotive #136 currently undergoing planned maintenance. Engine #1057, which had hauled excursion trains since the 2001 season, has been out of service since 2007 awaiting maintenance.

== See also ==
- List of heritage railways in Canada
- List of museums in Canada
- List of Ontario railways
