= Banting Memorial High School =

Location
- 203 Victoria St E Alliston, Ontario, L9R 1G5; Canada; 44.1553°N 79.8593°W

Information
- Funding type: Public
- Established: April 2nd, 1951
- School board: Simcoe County District School Board
- Superintendent: John Playford
- Area trustee: Sarah Beitz
- School number: 894060
- Principal: Rob Poissant
- Grades: 9-12
- Enrollment: 1530 (2020–21)
- Colours: Maroon, Baby Blue & White
- Team name: Banting Marauders
- Website: ban.scdsb.on.ca

Banting Memorial High School is a public secondary institution serving grades 9–12, located in Alliston, Ontario, Canada. It is part of the Simcoe County District School Board and has a student population of 1530. The current Principal is Rob Poissant.

The School is named in honour of Sir Frederick Grant Banting, a key member of the Canadian scientific team that discovered how to extract and use insulin for treating diabetes mellitus. Alliston, Ontario, Canada was the hometown of Sir Frederick Banting, and is also the foundation of his homestead. Banting Memorial offers attending students programs in Extended French courses and Specialist High Skills Major in Health & Wellness, Horticulture & Landscaping, Agriculture, Transportation and Art (starting 2025). The school participates in county sporting events under the name of the "Marauders". The school serves students residing in Alliston, Beeton, Tottenham, Hockley Valley and Adjala Township.

As of 2018 the Simcoe County District School board has recognized Banting Memorial as a priority school for improvement due to aging infrastructure, current recommendations are in place to renovate or rebuild the school building.

== Feeder schools ==
- Alliston Union PS
- Adjala Central PS
- Baxter Central PS
- Boyne River PS
- Cookstown Central PS
- Ernest Cumberland ES
- Tecumseth Beeton PS
- Tecumseth South PS
- Tosorontio Central PS
- Tottenham PS

== See also ==
- Education in Ontario
- List of high schools in Ontario
- Banting and Best Public School in Toronto, Ontario
- Sir Frederick Banting Secondary School in London, Ontario
