= Southern Ontario Railway =

Shortline railway in Ontario, Canada

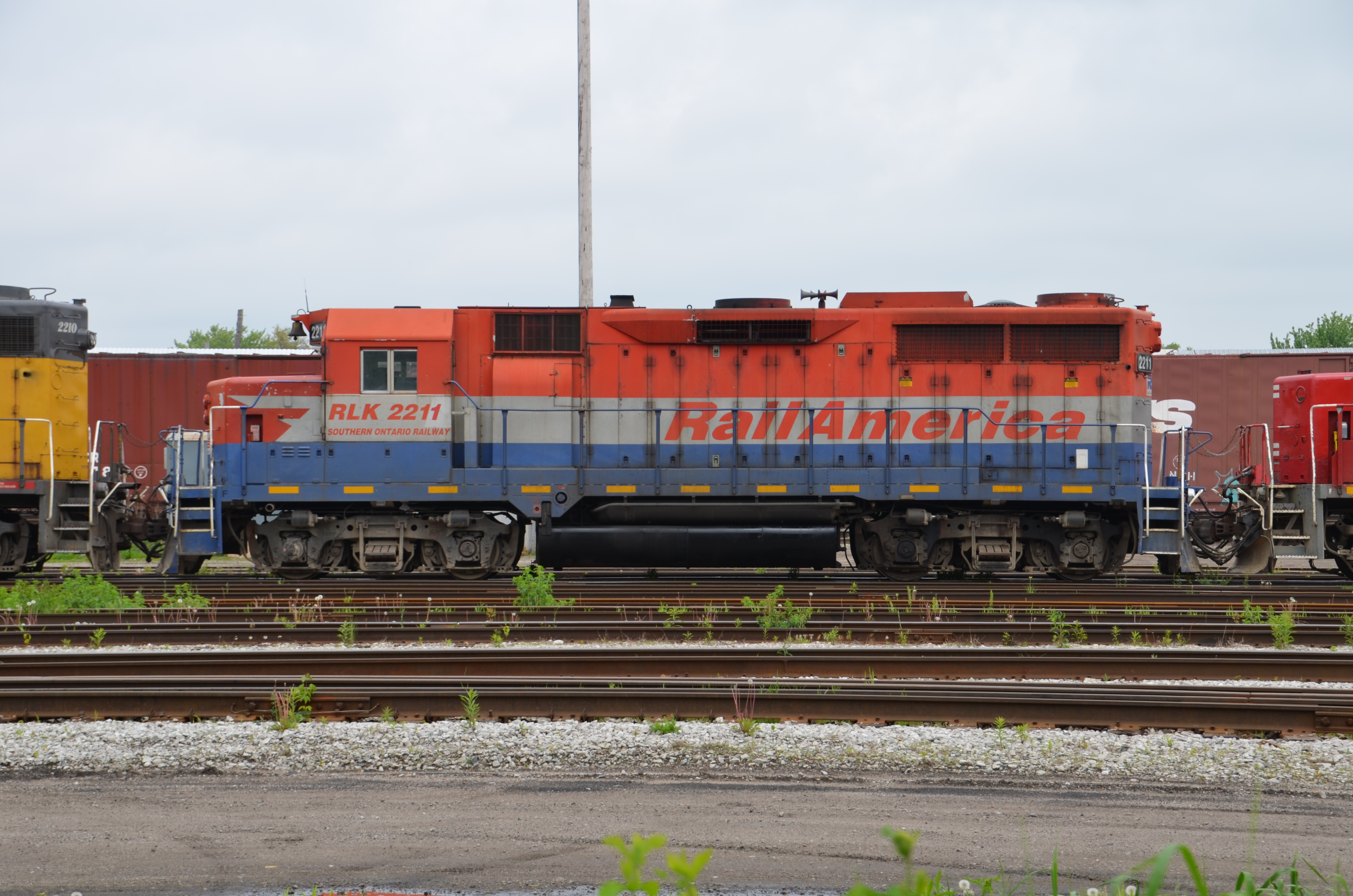
- Southern Ontario Railway #2211 in RailAmerica paint at London, ON in May 2011.

Overview
- Headquarters: Hamilton, Ontario
- Reporting mark: RLHH
- Locale: Southern Ontario
- Dates of operation: 1998–Present
- Predecessor: Canadian National Railway

Technical
- Track gauge: 4 ft 8 1/2 in (1,435 mm) standard gauge
- Length: 69 miles (111 km)

Other
- Website: Official website

Logo Pre-G&W

The Southern Ontario Railway (reporting mark RLHH) is a shortline railroad in the province of Ontario, owned and operated by Genesee & Wyoming Canada Inc., the Canadian subsidiary of Genesee & Wyoming Inc. It operated 69 miles (111 km) of track from Brantford to Nanticoke, Ontario, from 1998 to 2018. The railroad began operations in 1998, and was acquired by RailAmerica two years later. It had interchanges with the Canadian National Railway at Hamilton via trackage rights, Brantford and Paris, and interchanges with the Canadian Pacific Railway at Hamilton.

On July 23, 2012, Genesee & Wyoming Inc. announced that it intended to purchase RailAmerica in a deal valued at $1.39 billion. Approval of the purchase was granted by the U.S. Surface Transportation Board on December 19, 2012.

On September 18, 2018, operation of most of the Hagersville sub returned to CN. The Hamilton operations returned to CN December 13, 2018. SOR retains terminal operations at Nanticoke, and the line from Nanticoke to Garnet, mile 5.7, where it interchanges with CN.

The railroad's traffic comes mainly from steel, agricultural products, petroleum products, and chemicals. The SOR carries more than 44,000 carloads a year.

== Hagersville Subdivision ==
The Hagersville Subdivision extends from Nanticoke (Mile 0.0) to Simpson (Mile 35.0). Rail movements on this subdivision are governed by the Occupancy Control System of the Canadian Rail Operating Rules (CROR). While SOR operated the line, it was supervised by a rail traffic controller in North Bay, Ontario. The maximum authorized speed on this line is 30 miles per hour (48 km/h). Two or more trains operate daily on the Subdivision. The Hydro Spur (Mile 0.0) extends south off of the Hagersville Subdivision and descends southward to Lake Erie at a 1% grade. An Imperial Oil refinery is located just south and east of Mile 0.0 and an Ontario Hydro facility is located at the southern extremity of the spur (Mile 3.17). Train movements on the spur are governed by CROR Rule 105 and have a maximum authorized speed of 10 mph.

== Locomotive roster ==
Model	Maker	Numbers	Build Date	Remarks
EMD GP38-2	EMD	2081	11-1966 (Rebuilt 2016)	Ex. MEC 258
EMD GP38-2	EMD	2111	12-1972	Ex. SOU 5058, NS 5058
GMD GP40-2W	GMD	3049	03-1975	Ex. CN 9554
GMD SD40-2	GMD	3403	09-1966	Ex. CP 5516
EMD SD40-2	EMD	3404	12-1970	Ex. PC 6260
EMD GP9	EMD	4001	08-1959	Ex. SP 5872
EMD GP9	EMD	4003	09-1959	Ex. SP 5888
