= Lynn River =

River in Ontario, Canada

Coordinates: 42.809696°N 80.180347°W

The Lynn River is a fresh water river located in Norfolk County in Southwestern Ontario, Canada. It empties into Lake Erie at Port Dover.

== Summary ==
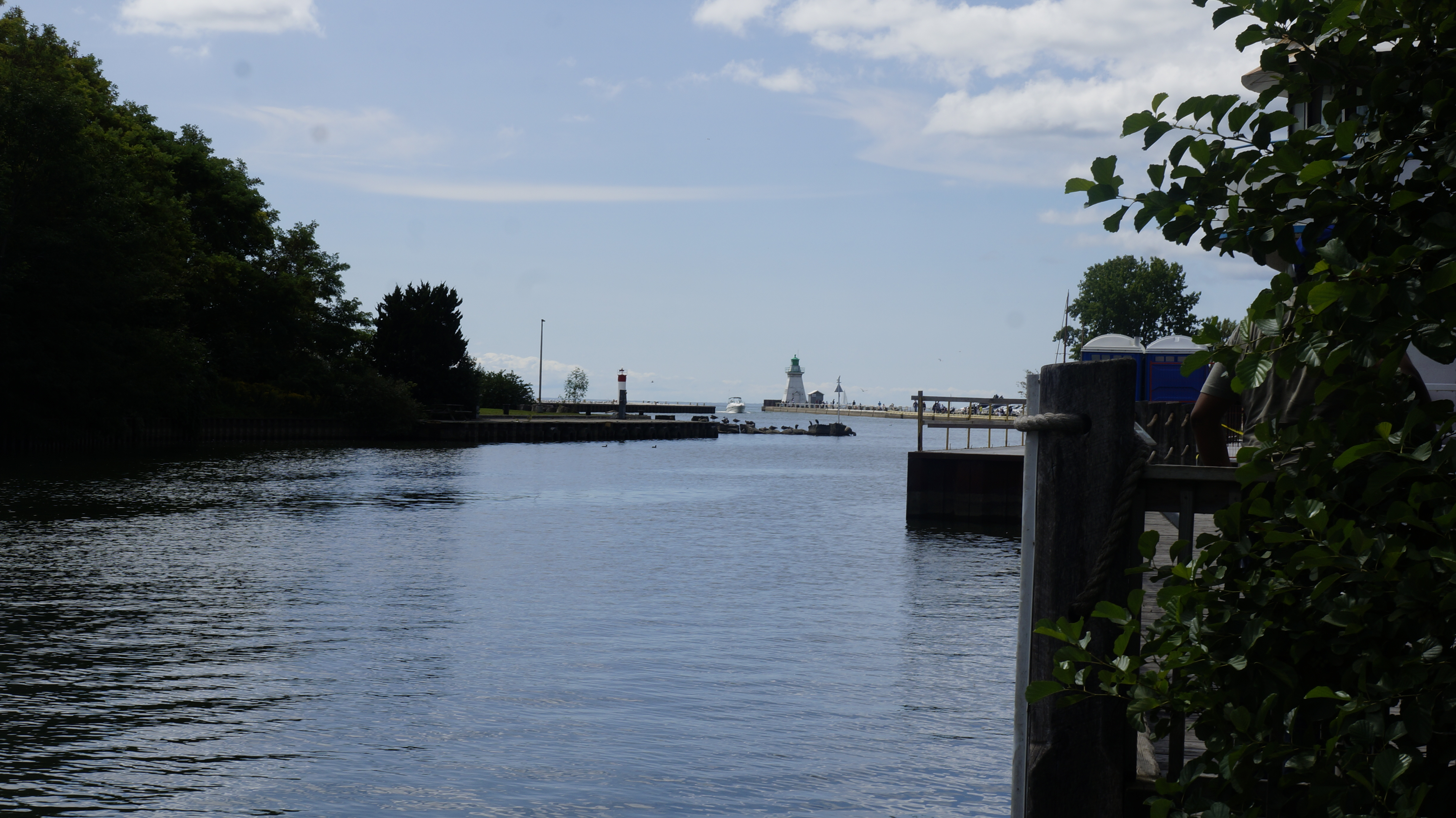
The Lynn River in Port Dover.

The Lynn Valley Trail follows the river between Port Dover and the town of Simcoe. It is possible to kayak down the Lynn River to the outskirts of Port Dover. The watershed stretches throughout Norfolk County and is one of few cold water tributaries feeding into the Eastern Lake Erie basin.

A small waterfall can be found on the Port Dover side of the Lynn River. However, the waterfall is surrounded by private property; making roadside viewing the only safe and legal way to view the waterfall. Stately homes can be found along the Lynn River; some with prices fetching up to nearly $3,000,000 on the open real estate market.

While the quality of the surface water is slightly above provincial average when it comes to cleanliness, the conditions of the surrounding forests are well below average when compared to the rest of Ontario.

Communities that are dependent on the Lynn River for their primary water supply include Bloomsburg, Lynnville, Nixon, Colborne, Renton, Simcoe, Hillcrest, Bill's Corners, Shand's Corners and Port Dover.

Black Creek joins the Lynn River at Port Dover prior to draining into Lake Erie. The watershed drains approximately 285 square kilometres (110 sq mi).

== See also ==
- List of rivers of Ontario
