= Tottenham, Ontario =

Town in south-central Ontario, Canada

Coordinates: 44°01′N 79°48′W

Tottenham
- Unincorporated community
- Location within Ontario
- Country: Canada
- Province: Ontario
- County: Simcoe
- Town: New Tecumseth

Area
  - Land: 9.93 km^{2} (3.83 sq mi)

Population (2021)
  - Total: 9,609
  - Density: 968/km^{2} (2,510/sq mi)
- Time zone: UTC-5 (Eastern (EST))
  - Summer (DST): UTC-4 (EDT)

Tottenham is a small community located in southern Simcoe County, Ontario, Canada south of Beeton and Alliston; all three were amalgamated in 1991 into the single Town of New Tecumseth. It takes its name from its first postmaster, Alexander Totten. The Tottenham Conservation Area is a recreational facility in the village, which is also famous for its annual event, the Tottenham Bluegrass Festival. There is also a restored steam train that is a tourist attraction, taking passengers to Beeton and back. Tottenham is home to four schools (two public, two Christian): Tottenham Public School, Tecumseth South Central Public School, Father F.X. O'Reilly School, and Saint Thomas Aquinas Catholic Secondary School.

The town was ravaged by a fire in 1895, which began at the McKinney foundry. Eighty structures were destroyed, including the foundry and a Methodist church. Despite warnings in 1884 that the town needed a fire engine, none had been purchased. To combat the 1895 fire, the town of Allandale sent its fire engine, preventing further spread of the fire.

== See also ==
- List of unincorporated communities in Ontario
